= Sexion d'Assaut discography =

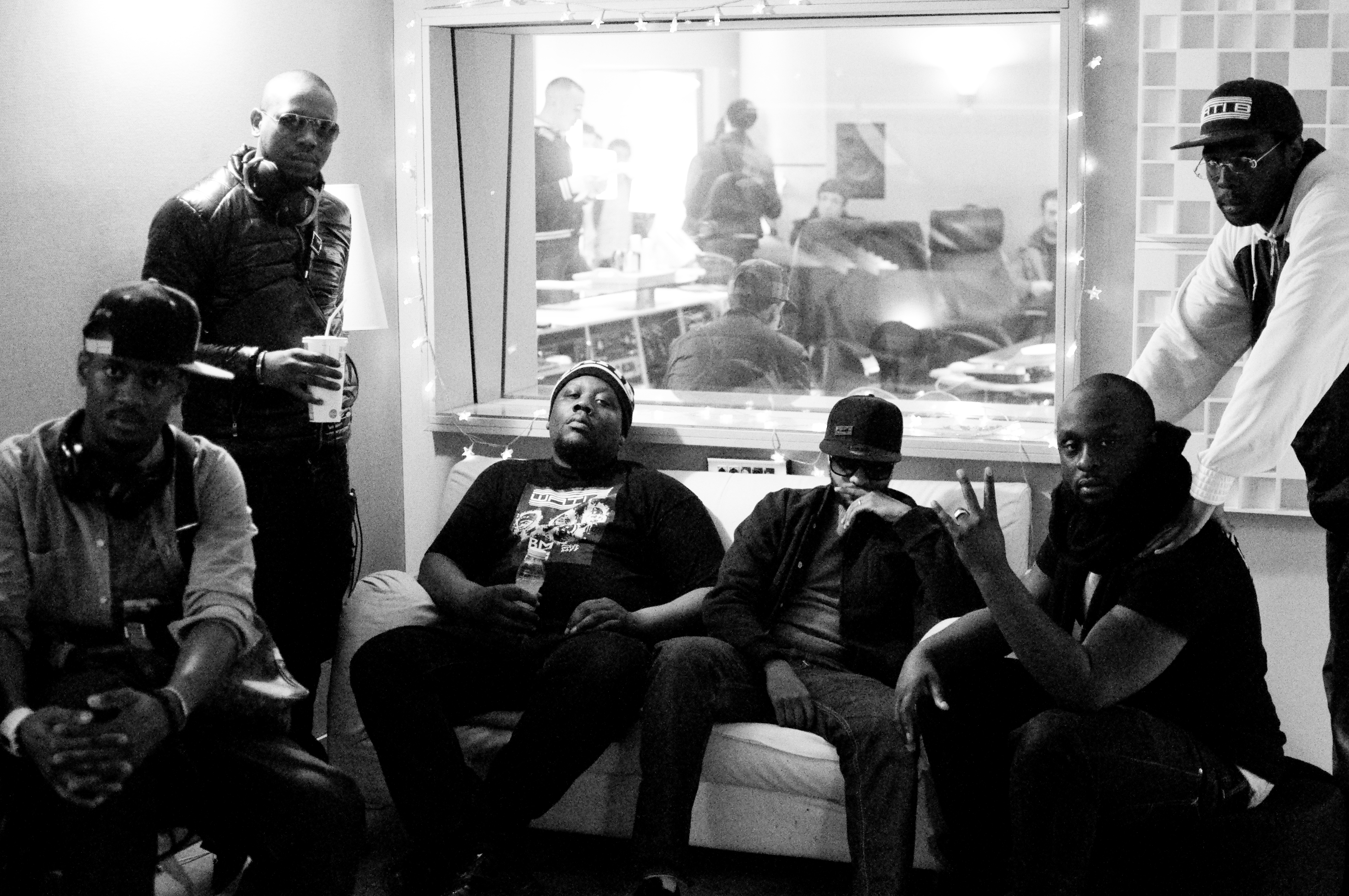
- La Sexion d'Assaut in 2012 with, from left to right: Black M, Doomams, JR O Crom, Lefa, Barack Adama and L.I.O Pétrodollars.
- Studio albums: 2
- EPs: 2
- Live albums: 1
- Compilation albums: 3

Sexion d'Assaut (French pronunciation: [sɛksjɔ̃ daso]), formerly known as 3ème Prototype (for "Troisième Prototype" [tʁwɑzjɛm pʁɔtɔtip]; English: "3rd Prototype"), was a French hip hop band formed in 2002, composed of eight Parisian rappers. They are signed to independent record label Wati B, which is under exclusive license to Sony Music Entertainment France.

The founding members were L.I.O. Pétrodollars, Alpha Diallo, Maska and Lefa. In 2003, it became a collective as Maître Gims and JR joined in. Throughout its existence, it included about 69 rappers, but set-up changed from time to time. The group distinguishes itself of staying away from "bling bling" that other French rappers have adopted. They also retain the style of old school hip-hop, but keep underground influences and spent almost a decade fostering an underground fanbase before releasing their debut studio album L'école des points vitaux in 2010.

Their album L'École des points vitaux in 2010 went quadruple platinum. The album En attendant L'Apogée: les Chroniques du 75 in 2011 and L'Apogée in 2012 both went platinum and diamond respectively.

== Albums ==
=== Studio albums ===
Title	Album details	Peak chart positions				Sales	Certifications
Title	Album details	FRA	BEL (Wa)	BEL (Fl)	SWI	Sales	Certifications
L'École des points vitaux	Released: 29 March 2010; Label: Wati B; Formats: CD, digital download	2	5	—	37	500,000	FRA: Diamond
L'Apogée	Released: 5 March 2012; Label: Wati B; Formats: CD, digital download	1	1	75	15	1,000,000	FRA: 3× Diamond; BEL: Platinum
"—" denotes a recording that did not chart or was not released in that territory.

=== Compilation albums ===
Title	Album details	Peak chart positions				Sales	Certifications
Title	Album details	FRA	BEL (Wa)	BEL (Fl)	SWI	Sales	Certifications
La Terre du Milieu	Released: 2005; Label: Wati B; Formats: CD, digital download	—	—	—	—	—	—
Les Chroniques du 75	Released: 5 January 2009; Label: Wati B; Formats: CD, digital download	—	—	—	—	—	—
En attendant L'Apogée: les Chroniques du 75	Released: 4 April 2011; Label: Wati B; Formats: DVD, digital download	3	10	—	46	150,000	FRA: Platinum
"—" denotes a recording that did not chart or was not released in that territory.

=== Mixtapes and Street albums ===
Title	Album details	Peak chart positions				Sales	Certifications
Title	Album details	FRA	BEL (Wa)	BEL (Fl)	SWI	Sales	Certifications
Le Renouveau (Mixtapes)	Released: 2008; Label: Wati B; Formats: CD, digital download	—	—	—	—	—	—
L'Écrasement de tête (Street album)	Released: 4 March 2009; Label: Wati B; Formats: CD, digital download	36	—	—	—	45,000	—
"—" denotes a recording that did not chart or was not released in that territory.

=== Live albums ===
Title	Album details	Peak chart positions				Sales	Certifications
Title	Album details	FRA	BEL (Wa)	BEL (Fl)	SWI	Sales	Certifications
L'Apogée à Bercy	Released: 2012; Label: Wati B; Formats: CD, digital download	17	—	—	—	—	—
"—" denotes a recording that did not chart or was not released in that territory.

== Singles ==
Single	Year	Peak chart positions			Album
Single	Year	FRA	BEL (Wa)	SWI	Album
"Désolé"	2010	1	5	15	L'École des points vitaux
"Casquette à l'envers"	2010	15	36	—	L'École des points vitaux
"Wati by Night" (feat. Dry)	2010	5	40	—	L'École des points vitaux
"Paris va bien"	2011	17	—	—	En attendant L'Apogée: les Chroniques du 75
"Qui t'a dit"	2011	18	—	—	En attendant L'Apogée: les Chroniques du 75
"Plus qu'un son"	2011	79	—	—	En attendant L'Apogée: les Chroniques du 75
"À bout d'souffle"	2011	27	—	—	En attendant L'Apogée: les Chroniques du 75
"Mets pas celle-là"	2011	54	—	—	L'Apogée
"Disque d'or"	2012	109	—	—	L'Apogée
"Avant qu'elle parte"	2012	3	1	28	L'Apogée
"Ma direction"	2012	5	2	36	L'Apogée
"Africain"	2012	108	—	—	L'Apogée
"Wati House"	2012	4	4	50	L'Apogée
"Problèmes d'adultes"	2012	11	8	—	L'Apogée
"Balader"	2012	27	12	—	L'Apogée
"J'reste debout"	2012	57	—	—	L'Apogée

== Featured in ==
Song	Year	Artists	Album
"Normal"	2008	Dry feat. Sexion d'Assaut	De la pure pour les durs (Mixtape by Dry)
"Ville de la tentation"	2008	Sexion d'Assaut	Département 765 (Compilation)
"Yougatavibe"	2008	Mister You feat. Gims	La rue c'est paro (Street album by Mister You)
"Course poursuite"	2009	Mister You feat. JR O Crom	Arrête You si tu peux (Mixtape by Mister You)
"Freestyle"	2009	Mister You feat. Gims and R.D.G	Arrête You si tu peux (Mixtape by Mister You)
"Wati bonhomme"	2009	Dry feat. Sexion d'Assaut	Les Derniers seront les premiers (Album by Dry)
"D'après vous"	2009	Mister You feat. JR O Crom and Gims	Prise d'otage (Maxi by Mister You)
"Paris de loin"	2009	H Magnum feat. Sexion d'Assaut	Rafales (Street album by H Magnum)
"Course poursuite" (La suite)	2010	Mister You feat. JR O Crom	Présumé coupable (Street album by Mister You)
"Hello Good Morning" (Remix)	2010	P. Diddy and Dirty Money feat. Sexion d'Assaut	T Sourd Ou Quoi? (Mixtape by DJ HCue)
"Ça marche en équipe"	2010	H Magnum feat. Sexion d'Assaut	Gotham City (Street tape by H Magnum)
"Ma vie c'est de l'égotrip"	2010	Abis feat. L.I.O. Pétrodollars	Quartier Hallam Vol. 2 (Street album by Abis)
"Paris Centre" (Kush Remix)	2011	Jarod feat. Black M	Feinte de Frappe (Mixtape by Jarod)
"Mine de rien"	2011	Jarod feat. Sexion d'Assaut	Feinte de Frappe (Mixtape by Jarod)
"RaggaMuffin" (Remix)	2011	Selah Sue feat. Sexion d'Assaut	Non-album release (only single)
"Donnez nous de la funk"	2011	DJ Abdel feat. Wati Funk, Dry, JR O Crom and Gims)	Evolution 2011 (Album by DJ Abdel)
"Pas de nouvelle bonne nouvelle"	2011	DJ Abdel feat. Gims and Black M	Evolution 2011 (Album by DJ Abdel)
"Sahbi"	2011	DJ Kore feat. Sexion d'Assaut	Raï'n'B Fever 4 (Album by DJ Kore)
"Blood Diamondz"	2011	Sniper feat. Sexion d'Assaut	À toute épreuve (Album by Sniper)
"Excellent"	2012	Sexion d'Assaut feat. H Magnum	Gotham City (Album by H Magnum) and Booska Tape Vol. 1 (Album by French hip-hop website Booska P)
"Mon Défaut"	2012	Sexion d'Assaut feat. Dry	Tôt ou tard (Album by Dry)
"Ma Mélodie"	2012	Dry feat. Gims	Tôt ou tard (Album by Dry)
"Déjà vu"	2012	Dry feat. Doomams and JR O Crom	Tôt ou tard (Album by Dry)

== Other releases and charted songs ==
=== Clips ===
- 2007: "Histoire pire que vraie"
- 2008: "Anti-Tecktonik"
- 2009: "T'es bête ou quoi?"
- 2009: "Wati-Bon Son" (feat. Dry)
- 2010: "L'école des points vitaux"
- 2010: "Casquette à l'envers"
- 2010: "Changement d'ambiance"
- 2010: "Désolé"
- 2010: "Wati by Night" (feat. Dry)
- 2011: "Ca marche en équipe" (feat. H Magnum)
- 2011: "Paris va bien"
- 2011: "Qui t'a dit?"
- 2011: "Plus qu'un son"
- 2011: "Vu la haine que j'ai"
- 2011: "Pas d'chance"
- 2011: "Noir"
- 2011: "Traqué"
- 2011: "À bout d'souffle"
- 2011: "O'brothers"
- 2011: "Flow d'killer"
- 2012: "Disque d'or"
- 2012: "Excellent" (feat. H Magnum)
- 2012: "Avant qu'elle parte"
- 2012: "Ma direction"
- 2012: "Wati House"

=== Street clips ===
- 2008: "30%"
- 2008: "Chroniques du Mystère"
- 2008: "Où sont les Kickeurs?"
- 2008: "Freestyle
- 2009: "Ah ouais parait que j'suis doué"
- 2009: "Même pas l'smic"
- 2010: "Le Relais"
- 2010: "A.D. (Africain Déterminé)"
- 2010: "Instinct de Survie"
- 2010: "Cramponnez-vous"
- 2011: "Ra-Fall"
- 2011: "BSS"
- 2011: "Vu la haine que j'ai"
- 2011: "Pas d'Chance"
- 2011: "Black Shady part. 2"
- 2011: "Mamadou"
- 2011: "Boy's in the Hood"
- 2011: "H.L.M. Life"
