= List of top 10 singles in 2010 (France) =

This is a list of singles that have peaked in the top 10 of the French Singles Chart in 2010. 72 singles reached the top ten during the year with 11 peaking at number one.

== Top-ten singles ==
Artist(s)	Single	Peak	Peak date
Mika	"Rain"	6	16 January
Kesha	"Tik Tok"	1	16 January
Lady Gaga	"Bad Romance"	2	23 January
Christophe Maé	"Dingue, dingue, dingue"	7	30 January
Jay-Z featuring Alicia Keys	"Empire State of Mind"	3	30 January
Artists for Haiti	"We Are the World 25 for Haiti"	7	20 February
Muse	"Uprising"	10	27 February
Joyce Jonathan	"Pas besoin de toi"	6	27 February
Stromae	"Alors on danse"	1	27 February
David Guetta featuring Kid Cudi	"Memories"	4	6 March
Rihanna	"Rude Boy"	2	6 March
Cœur de pirate and Julien Doré	"Pour un infidèle"	6	13 March
Les Enfoirés	"Si l'on s'aimait, si"	5	20 March
Iyaz	"Replay"	3	20 March
Black Eyed Peas	"Rock That Body"	9	27 March
L'Algérino	"Sur la tête de ma mère"	7	27 March
Cheryl Cole	"Fight for This Love"	6	27 March
Christophe Maé	"J'ai laissé"	2	27 March
Géraldine Nakache and Leïla Bekhti	"Chanson sur une drôle de vie"	9	3 April
Camélia Jordana	"Non non non (Écouter Barbara)"	3	3 April
Lady Gaga featuring Beyoncé	"Telephone"	2	3 April
Justin Bieber featuring Ludacris	"Baby"	9	10 April
Owl City	"Fireflies"	7	17 April
Edward Maya featuring Vika Jigulina	"This Is My Life"	5	17 April
Sexion d'Assaut	"Désolé"	1	17 April
Remady	"No Superstar"	6	24 April
Sean Paul featuring Zaho	"Hold My Hand"	3	1 May
Taio Cruz	"Break Your Heart"	2	1 May
Gnarls Barkley	"Going On"	8	8 May
Sexion d'Assaut	"Wati By Night"	6	8 May
Inna	"Hot"	5	15 May
Timbaland featuring Katy Perry	"If We Ever Meet Again"	4	15 May
Gaëtan Roussel	"Help Myself (Nous ne faisons que passer)"	9	22 May
Plan B	"She Said"	5	22 May
Train	"Hey, Soul Sister"	10	5 June
Rihanna	"Te Amo"	8	12 June
David Guetta and Chris Willis featuring Fergie and LMFAO	"Gettin' Over You"	6	12 June
Lady Gaga	"Alejandro"	3	12 June
Shy'm	"Je sais"	3	19 June
Shakira featuring Freshlyground	"Waka Waka (This Time for Africa)"	1	19 June
Zaz	"Je veux"	3	26 June
K'naan and Féfé	"Wavin' Flag"	3	10 July
Enrique Iglesias featuring Pitbull	"I Like It"	9	17 July
Katy Perry featuring Snoop Dogg	"California Gurls"	3	17 July
Fatal Bazooka	"Ce matin va être une pure soirée"	4	24 July
Inna	"Amazing"	4	31 July
René la Taupe	"Mignon Mignon"	1	14 August
Yolanda Be Cool and DCUP	"We No Speak Americano"	1	4 September
Katy Perry	"Teenage Dream"	6	11 September
Eminem featuring Rihanna	"Love the Way You Lie"	1	11 September
Flo Rida featuring David Guetta	"Club Can't Handle Me"	5	18 September
Mohombi	"Bumpy Ride"	4	25 September
Taio Cruz	"Dynamite"	3	25 September
B.o.B featuring Hayley Williams	"Airplanes"	7	2 October
Rihanna	"Only Girl (In the World)"	1	2 October
Soprano	"Hiro"	2	9 October
Julian Perretta	"Wonder Why"	6	16 October
Mylène Farmer	"Oui mais... non"	1	16 October
Usher featuring Pitbull	"DJ Got Us Fallin' in Love"	3	23 October
Shakira featuring Dizzee Rascal	"Loca"	1	23 October
Martin Solveig featuring Dragonette	"Hello"	6	6 November
Guillaume Grand	"Toi et moi"	5	6 November
Duck Sauce	"Barbra Streisand"	3	6 November
Mister You	"Les p'tits de chez moi"	10	13 November
Mike Posner	"Cooler than Me"	6	13 November
Black Eyed Peas	"The Time (Dirty Bit)"	1	20 November
Taio Cruz featuring Kylie Minogue	"Higher"	9	27 November
David Guetta featuring Rihanna	"Who's That Chick?"	5	27 November
Rihanna featuring Drake	"What's My Name?"	5	11 December
Israel Kamakawiwo'ole	"Over the Rainbow"	4	18 December
Katy Perry	"Firework"	5	25 December

== Entries by artists ==
The following table shows artists who achieved two or more top 10 entries in 2010. The figures include both main artists and featured artists and the peak positions in brackets.

Entries	Artist	Songs
6	Rihanna	"Rude Boy" (2), "Te Amo" (8), "Love the Way You Lie" (1), "Only Girl (In the World)" (1), "Who's That Chick?" (5), "What's My Name?" (5)
4	David Guetta	"Memories" (4), "Gettin' Over You" (6), "Club Can't Handle Me" (5), "Who's That Chick?" (5)
4	Katy Perry	"If We Ever Meet Again" (4), "California Gurls" (3), "Teenage Dream" (6), "Firework" (5)
3	Lady Gaga	"Bad Romance" (2), "Telephone" (2), "Alejandro" (3)
3	Taio Cruz	"Break Your Heart" (2), "Dynamite" (3), "Higher" (9)
2	Black Eyed Peas	"Rock That Body" (9), "The Time (Dirty Bit)" (1)
2	Christophe Maé	"Dingue, dingue, dingue" (7), "J'ai laissé" (2)
2	Inna	"Hot" (5), "Amazing" (4)
2	Pitbull	"I Like It" (9), "DJ Got Us Fallin' in Love" (3)
2	Sexion d'Assaut	"Désolé" (1), "Wati By Night" (6)
2	Shakira	"Waka Waka (This Time for Africa)" (1), "Loca" (1)

== See also ==
- 2010 in music
- List of number-one singles of 2010 (France)
