= List of top 100 singles of 2010 (France) =

This is the list of the 100 best-selling singles of 2010 in France. Rankings are based on the combined sales of physical and digital singles.

== Top 100 singles ==
Pos.	Artist(s)	Single
1	Shakira featuring Freshlyground	"Waka Waka (This Time for Africa)"
2	Stromae	"Alors on danse"
3	René la Taupe	"Mignon Mignon"
4	Sexion d'Assaut	"Désolé"
5	Kesha	"Tik Tok"
6	Lady Gaga	"Bad Romance"
7	Rihanna	"Only Girl (In the World)"
8	Shakira featuring Dizzee Rascal or El Cata	"Loca"
9	Christophe Maé	"Dingue, dingue, dingue"
10	Taio Cruz	"Break Your Heart"
11	Eminem featuring Rihanna	"Love the Way You Lie"
12	Yolanda Be Cool and DCUP	"We No Speak Americano"
13	Katy Perry featuring Snoop Dogg	"California Gurls"
14	K'naan	"Wavin' Flag"
15	Zaz	"Je veux"
16	Lady Gaga	"Alejandro"
17	Lady Gaga featuring Beyoncé	"Telephone"
18	Coeur de Pirate and Julien Doré	"Pour un infidèle"
19	The Black Eyed Peas	"I Gotta Feeling"
20	The Black Eyed Peas	"The Time (Dirty Bit)"
21	David Guetta featuring Kid Cudi	"Memories"
22	David Guetta and Chris Willis featuring Fergie and LMFAO	"Gettin' Over You"
23	Edward Maya featuring Vika Jigulina	"Stereo Love"
24	Inna	"Amazing"
25	Gaëtan Roussel	"Help Myself (Nous ne faissons que passer)"
26	Jay-Z featuring Alicia Keys	"Empire State of Mind"
27	Justin Bieber featuring Ludacris	"Baby"
28	Taio Cruz	"Dynamite"
29	Inna	"Hot"
30	Rihanna	"Rude Boy"
31	Fatal Bazooka	"Ce matin va être une pure soirée"
32	Sean Paul	"Hold My Hand"
33	Duck Sauce	"Barbra Streisand"
34	Sexion d'Assaut	"Wati By Night"
35	B.o.B featuring Hayley Williams	"Airplanes"
36	Iyaz	"Replay"
37	The Black Eyed Peas	"Meet Me Halfway"
38	Shy'm	"Je sais"
39	Timbaland featuring Katy Perry	"If We Ever Meet Again"
40	Camélia Jordana	"Non non non"
41	Usher featuring Pitbull	"DJ Got Us Fallin' in Love"
42	Edward Maya featuring Vika Jigulina	"This Is My Life"
43	Mylène Farmer	"Oui mais... non"
44	Mohombi	"Bumpy Ride"
45	Israel Kamakawiwoʻole	"Over the Rainbow"
46	Lucenzo	"Vem Dançar Kuduro"
47	Jason Derülo	"Whatcha Say"
48	Flo Rida featuring David Guetta	"Club Can't Handle Me"
49	Train	"Hey, Soul Sister"
50	Owl City	"Fireflies"
51	The Black Eyed Peas	"Rock That Body"
52	Remady	"No Superstar"
53	Joyce Jonathan	"Pas besoin de toi"
54	Klaas	"Our Own Way"
55	Jessy Matador	"Allez Ola Olé"
56	Rihanna	"Te Amo"
57	Gossip	"Heavy Cross"
58	Muse	"Uprising"
59	Enrique Iglesias featuring Pitbull	"I Like It"
60	Plan B	"She Said"
61	Martin Solveig featuring Dragonette	"Hello"
62	Robert Francis	"Junebug"
63	Julian Perretta	"Wonder Why"
64	Rihanna	"Russian Roulette"
65	Katy Perry	"Teenage Dream"
66	Guillaume Grand	"Toi et moi"
67	Eminem	"Not Afraid"
68	Muse	"Undisclosed Desires"
69	Christophe Maé	"J'ai laissé"
70	Sexion d'Assaut	"Rien n't'appartient"
71	Usher featuring will.i.am	"OMG"
72	Mika	"Rain"
73	Mike Posner	"Cooler Than Me"
74	Joyce Jonathan	"Je ne sais pas"
75	David Guetta featuring Akon	"Sexy Bitch"
76	The Black Eyed Peas	"Missing You"
77	Cheryl Cole	"Fight for This Love"
78	Remady feat. Manu-L	"Give Me a Sign"
79	L'Algérino	"Sur la tête de ma mère"
80	V V Brown	"Shark in the Water"
81	Soprano	"Hiro"
82	Yannick Noah	"Angela"
83	Pony Pony Run Run	"Hey You"
84	Christophe Maé	"Je me lâche"
85	Lady Antebellum	"Need You Now"
86	Aloe Blacc	"I Need a Dollar"
87	Géraldine Nakache and Leïla Bekhti	"Chanson sur une drôle de vie"
88	Vanessa Paradis	"Il y a"
89	Ben l'Oncle Soul	"Seven Nation Army"
90	Swedish House Mafia	"One"
91	Jena Lee	"Je me perds"
92	Jena Lee	"J'aimerais tellement"
93	Michael Bublé	"Haven't Met You Yet"
94	Lily Allen	"22"
95	M. Pokora	"Juste une photo de toi"
96	Kylie Minogue	"All the Lovers"
97	Gnarls Barkley	"Going On"
98	Example	"Won't Go Quietly"
99	Inna	"Déjà Vu"
100	Lady Gaga	"Poker Face"

== See also ==
- 2010 in music
- List of number-one hits (France)
- List of number-one hits of 2010 (France)
- List of artists who reached number one on the French Singles Chart
