= Avant qu'elle parte =

Single by Sexion d'Assaut

from the album L'Apogée
- Released: January 5, 2012
- Genre: Rap, French hip hop
- Length: 4:35
- Label: Wati B

Sexion d'Assaut singles chronology
"Disque d'or" (2012)	"Avant qu'elle parte" (2012)	"Ma direction" (2012)

Music video
- "Avant qu'elle parte" on YouTube

"Avant qu'elle parte" (English: "Before she leaves") is a song by the French rap group Sexion d'Assaut released on January 5, 2012. From the studio album L'Apogée, the song was written by Barack Adama, Black M, Gims, Lefa, JR O Crom, Maska, Doomams and Stan E produced by Wati B and Edit by Five copyright bank represented by Akad Daroul.

On April 22, "Avant elle parte" sold 114,179 copies. The video clip was released on March 14, 2012 on the YouTube video sharing site on the Sexion d'Assaut account. The track was awarded the Grand prix Sacem and was voted best Francophone Song of the Year at the NRJ Music Awards.

== Awards ==
Year	Nominee / work	Award	Result
2012	"Avant qu'elle parte"	Grand prix Sacem (Rolf Marbot Song of the Year Award)	Won
2013	"Avant qu'elle parte"	NRJ Music Awards (Francophone Song of the Year)	Won

== Track listing ==
- Promo - Digital music spote
1. Avant qu'elle parte – 4:34

== Charts ==
Chart (2012)	Peak position
France (SNEP)	3
Belgium (Ultratop 50 Wallonia)	1
Belgium (Ultratop 50 Flanders)	57
Switzerland (Schweizer Hitparade)	28

== Certifications ==
Region	Certification	Certified units/sales
Belgium (BEA)	Gold	15,000^{*}
France (SNEP)	Gold	150,000^{*}
Switzerland (IFPI Switzerland)	Gold	15,000^{^}
^{*} Sales figures based on certification alone.^{^} Shipments figures based on certification alone.
