= List of number-one singles of 2010 (France) =

This is a list of the French SNEP Top 100 CD Singles, Top 50 Digital Singles, Top 200 CD Albums & Top 50 Digital Albums number ones of 2010.

== Number-ones by week ==
=== Singles chart ===
| Week | Issue date | Physical singles | | | Digital singles | | Sales | |
| Week | Issue date | Artist | Title | Sales | Artist | Title | Internet | Internet + Mobile Phones |
|---|---|---|---|---|---|---|---|---|
| 1 | January 3 | Edward Maya & Vika Jigulina | "Stereo Love" | 3,813 | Edward Maya & Vika Jigulina | "Stereo Love" | 9,763 | |
| 2 | January 10 | Edward Maya & Vika Jigulina | "Stereo Love" | 2,707 | Edward Maya & Vika Jigulina | "Stereo Love" | 6,639 | |
| 3 | January 17 | Edward Maya & Vika Jigulina | "Stereo Love" | 3,322 | Kesha | "Tik Tok" | 7,554 | |
| 4 | January 24 | Lady Gaga | "Bad Romance" | 3,569 | Kesha | "Tik Tok" | 7,566 | |
| 5 | January 31 | Christophe Maé | "Dingue, dingue, dingue" | 10,970 | Kesha | "Tik Tok" | 8,021 | |
| 6 | February 7 | Christophe Maé | "Dingue, dingue, dingue" | 6,141 | Kesha | "Tik Tok" | 8,154 | |
| 7 | February 14 | Christophe Maé | "Dingue, dingue, dingue" | 4,754 | Kesha | "Tik Tok" | 7,299 | |
| 8 | February 21 | Kesha | "Tik Tok" | 3,493 | Kesha | "Tik Tok" | 5,991 | |
| 9 | February 28 | Kesha | "Tik Tok" | 2,856 | Stromae | "Alors on danse" | 6,476 | |
| 10 | March 7 | Stromae | "Alors on danse" | 4,415 | Stromae | "Alors on danse" | 6,413 | |
| 11 | March 14 | Cœur de pirate featuring Julien Doré | "Pour un infidèle" | 4,403 | Stromae | "Alors on danse" | 6,507 | |
| 12 | March 21 | Stromae | "Alors on danse" | | Stromae | "Alors on danse" | | |
| 13 | March 28 | Stromae | "Alors on danse" | 4,018 | Stromae | "Alors on danse" | 6,258 | |
| 14 | April 4 | Stromae | "Alors on danse" | 4,000 | Stromae | "Alors on danse" | 6,250 | |
| 15 | April 11 | Stromae | "Alors on danse" | 3,986 | Stromae | "Alors on danse" | 5,514 | 8,927 |
| 16 | April 18 | Stromae | "Alors on danse" | 3,771 | Sexion d'Assaut | "Désolé" | 4,520 | |
| 17 | April 25 | Stromae | "Alors on danse" | 3,100 | Stromae | "Alors on danse" | 5,700 | |
| 18 | May 2 | Stromae | "Alors on danse" | 2,510 | Sexion d'Assaut | "Désolé" | 5,400 | 10,267 |
| 19 | May 9 | Stromae | "Alors on danse" | 3,400 | Sexion d'Assaut | "Désolé" | | 11,200 |
| 20 | May 16 | Justin Bieber featuring Ludacris | "Baby" | | Sexion d'Assaut | "Désolé" | | 10,100 |
| 21 | May 23 | Stromae | "Alors on danse" | 1,855 | Sexion d'Assaut | "Désolé" | | 9,500 |
| 22 | May 30 | Justin Bieber featuring Ludacris | "Baby" | 2,100 | Sexion d'Assaut | "Désolé" | | 10,100 |
| 23 | June 6 | Jessy Matador | "Allez Ola Olé" | 2,400 | Sexion d'Assaut | "Désolé" | | 9,300 |
| 24 | June 13 | Jessy Matador | "Allez Ola Olé" | 2,000 | Sexion d'Assaut | "Désolé" | | 9,500 |
| 25 | June 20 | David Guetta & Chris Willis featuring Fergie & LMFAO | "Gettin' Over You" | 2,300 | Shakira feat. Freshlyground | "Waka Waka (This Time for Africa)" | | 10,000 |
| 26 | June 27 | Jessy Matador | "Allez Ola Olé" | 2,500 | Shakira feat. Freshlyground | "Waka Waka (This Time for Africa)" | | 10,000 |
| 27 | July 4 | Jessy Matador | "Allez Ola Olé" | 3,200 | Shakira feat. Freshlyground | "Waka Waka (This Time for Africa)" | | 13,500 |
| 28 | July 11 | Jessy Matador | "Allez Ola Olé" | 3,000 | Shakira feat. Freshlyground | "Waka Waka (This Time for Africa)" | | 15,400 |
| 29 | July 18 | Collectif Métissé | "Debout pour danser" | 3,100 | Shakira feat. Freshlyground | "Waka Waka (This Time for Africa)" | | 19,566 |
| 30 | July 25 | Shakira featuring Freshlyground | "Waka Waka (This Time for Africa)" | | Shakira feat. Freshlyground | "Waka Waka (This Time for Africa)" | | 17,000 |
| 31 | August 1 | Shakira featuring Freshlyground | "Waka Waka (This Time for Africa)" | | Shakira feat. Freshlyground | "Waka Waka (This Time for Africa)" | | 16,000 |
| 32 | August 8 | Shakira featuring Freshlyground | "Waka Waka (This Time for Africa)" | 9,200 | Shakira feat. Freshlyground | "Waka Waka (This Time for Africa)" | | 14,250 |
| 33 | August 15 | Shakira featuring Freshlyground | "Waka Waka (This Time for Africa)" | 8,700 | René la Taupe | "Mignon Mignon" | | 13,000 |
| 34 | August 22 | Shakira featuring Freshlyground | "Waka Waka (This Time for Africa)" | 7,900 | René la Taupe | "Mignon Mignon" | | 11,200 |
| 35 | August 29 | Shakira featuring Freshlyground | "Waka Waka (This Time for Africa)" | 8,200 | Shakira feat. Freshlyground | "Waka Waka" | | 11,100 |
| 36 | September 5 | René la Taupe | "Mignon Mignon" | 17,300 | Yolanda Be Cool & DCUP | "We No Speak Americano" | | 10,800 |
| 37 | September 12 | René la Taupe | "Mignon Mignon" | 13,000 | Eminem feat. Rihanna | "Love the Way You Lie" | | |
| 38 | September 19 | René la Taupe | "Mignon Mignon" | 17,460 | Eminem feat. Rihanna | "Love the Way You Lie" | | 9,663 |
| 39 | September 26 | René la Taupe | "Mignon Mignon" | 11,000 | Shakira feat. Freshlyground | "Waka Waka" | | 8,660 |
| 40 | October 3 | René la Taupe | "Mignon Mignon" | 10,400 | Rihanna | "Only Girl (In the World)" | | 8,100 |
| 41 | October 10 | René la Taupe | "Mignon Mignon" | 9,100 | Rihanna | "Only Girl (In the World)" | | 9,300 |
| 42 | October 17 | René la Taupe | "Mignon Mignon" | 6,400 | Mylène Farmer | "Oui mais... non" | | 9,200 |
| 43 | October 24 | René la Taupe | "Mignon Mignon" | 4,600 | Shakira feat. El Cata or Dizzee Rascal | "Loca" | | 10,800 |
| 44 | October 31 | René la Taupe | "Mignon Mignon" | 4,800 | Shakira feat. El Cata or Dizzee Rascal | "Loca" | | 12,400 |
| 45 | November 7 | René la Taupe | "Mignon Mignon" | 4,300 | Shakira feat. El Cata or Dizzee Rascal | "Loca" | | 14,200 |
| 46 | November 14 | René la Taupe | "Mignon Mignon" | 4,000 | Shakira feat. El Cata or Dizzee Rascal | "Loca" | | 15,000 |
| 47 | November 21 | René la Taupe | "Mignon Mignon" | 2,700 | The Black Eyed Peas | "The Time (Dirty Bit)" | | 13,200 |
| 48 | November 28 | René la Taupe | "Mignon Mignon" | 2,800 | The Black Eyed Peas | "The Time (Dirty Bit)" | | 13,563 |
| 49 | December 5 | Mylène Farmer | "Oui mais... non" | 9,700 | The Black Eyed Peas | "The Time (Dirty Bit)" | | 21,026 |
| 50 | December 12 | Mylène Farmer | "Oui mais... non" | 14,961 | The Black Eyed Peas | "The Time (Dirty Bit)" | | 17,600 |
| 51 | December 19 | Mylène Farmer | "Oui mais... non" | 4,783 | The Black Eyed Peas | "The Time (Dirty Bit)" | | 16,100 |
| 52 | December 26 | IZ Kamakawiwoʻole | "Over the Rainbow" | 5,900 | The Black Eyed Peas | "The Time (Dirty Bit)" | | 15,500 |

=== Albums chart ===
| Week | Issue date | Physical albums | | | Digital albums | | |
| Week | Issue date | Artist | Title | Sales | Artist | Title | Sales |
|---|---|---|---|---|---|---|---|
| 1 | January 3 | The Black Eyed Peas Compilation | The E.N.D. NRJ Music Awards 2010 | 14,855 46,651 | Soundtrack | Avatar | 1,759 |
| 2 | January 10 | The Black Eyed Peas Compilation | The E.N.D. NRJ Music Awards 2010 | 9,953 15,052 | The Black Eyed Peas | The E.N.D. | 1,261 |
| 3 | January 17 | The Black Eyed Peas Compilation | The E.N.D. NRJ Music Awards 2010 | 11,740 14,335 | The Black Eyed Peas | The E.N.D. | 1,464 |
| 4 | January 24 | The Black Eyed Peas Compilation | The E.N.D. NRJ Music Awards 2010 | 15,633 13,665 | The Black Eyed Peas | The E.N.D. | 2,194 |
| 5 | January 31 | The Black Eyed Peas Compilation | The E.N.D. NRJ Music Awards 2010 | 17,646 23,572 | Cœur de pirate | Cœur de pirate | 3,674 |
| 6 | February 7 | Black Eyed Peas Compilation | The E.N.D. Urgence Haïti | 12,703 18,801 | Various Artists | Hope for Haiti Now | 1,565 |
| 7 | February 14 | Sade | Soldier of Love | 18,986 | Massive Attack | Heligoland | 4,436 |
| 8 | February 21 | Sade | Soldier of Love | 14,799 | The xx | xx | 2,669 |
| 9 | February 28 | Sade | Soldier of Love | 15,151 | Sade | Soldier of Love | 1,538 |
| 10 | March 7 | Sade | Soldier of Love | 14,293 | Muse | The Resistance | 1,145 |
| 11 | March 14 | Les Enfoirés | La crise de nerfs ! | 143,011 | Les Enfoirés | La crise de nerfs ! | 8,581 |
| 12 | March 21 | Les Enfoirés | La crise de nerfs ! | 118,980 | Les Enfoirés | La crise de nerfs ! | 3,846 |
| 13 | March 28 | Christophe Maé | On trace la route | 128,714 | Christophe Maé | On trace la route | 7,826 |
| 14 | April 4 | Christophe Maé | On trace la route | 54,204 | Sexion d'Assaut | L'École des points vitaux | 2,720 |
| 15 | April 11 | Christophe Maé | On trace la route | 29,461 | Christophe Maé | On trace la route | 1,787 |
| 16 | April 18 | Les Prêtres | Spiritus Dei | 21,735 | MGMT | Congratulations | 3,094 |
| 17 | April 25 | Les Prêtres | Spiritus Dei | 21,407 | Gotan Project | Tango 3.0 | 1,700 |
| 18 | May 2 | Les Prêtres | Spiritus Dei | 21,911 | Sexion d'Assaut | L'École des points vitaux | 1,438 |
| 19 | May 9 | Les Prêtres | Spiritus Dei | 20,400 | Sexion d'Assaut | L'École des points vitaux | 1,600 |
| 20 | May 16 | Les Prêtres | Spiritus Dei | 24,050 | Zaz | Zaz | |
| 21 | May 23 | Les Prêtres | Spiritus Dei | 15,400 | Ben l'Oncle Soul | Ben l'Oncle Soul | 2,300 |
| 22 | May 30 | Les Prêtres | Spiritus Dei | 27,300 | Charlie Winston | Hobo | 1,700 |
| 23 | June 6 | Les Prêtres | Spiritus Dei | 11,708 | Ben l'Oncle Soul | Ben l'Oncle Soul | 1,400 |
| 24 | June 13 | Les Prêtres | Spiritus Dei | 12,000 | Muse | The Resistance | 5,300 |
| 25 | June 20 | Zaz | Zaz | 17,600 | Zaz | Zaz | 2,000 |
| 26 | June 27 | Zaz | Zaz | 14,400 | Eminem | Recovery | 3,300 |
| 27 | July 4 | Zaz Compilation | Zaz NRJ Summer Hits Only 2010 | 14,200 18,800 | Compilation | NRJ Summer Hits Only 2010 | 1,500 |
| 28 | July 11 | Zaz Compilation | Zaz NRJ Summer Hits Only 2010 | 12,900 18,600 | Kylie Minogue | Aphrodite | 2,100 |
| 29 | July 18 | Zaz Compilation | Zaz NRJ Summer Hits Only 2010 | | Compilation | Dancefloor FG : Été Summer 2010 | |
| 30 | July 25 | Zaz Compilation | Zaz NRJ Summer Hits Only 2010 | | Zaz | Zaz | |
| 31 | August 1 | Zaz Compilation | Zaz NRJ Summer Hits Only 2010 | | Ben l'Oncle Soul | Ben l'Oncle Soul | |
| 32 | August 8 | Zaz Compilation | Zaz NRJ Extravadance 2010 | 10,550 16,000 | Arcade Fire | The Suburbs | |
| 33 | August 15 | Zaz Compilation | Zaz NRJ Extravadance 2010 | 9,600 14,600 | Compilation | Fun Summer Dance 2010 | 800 |
| 34 | August 22 | Iron Maiden | The Final Frontier | 13,700 | Joyce Jonathan | Sur Mes Gardes | 900 |
| 35 | August 29 | Yannick Noah | Frontières | 87,600 | Yannick Noah | Frontières | 3,500 |
| 36 | September 5 | Yannick Noah | Frontières | 45,300 | Michel Sardou | Être une femme 2010 | 2,000 |
| 37 | September 12 | Yannick Noah | Frontières | 33,270 | Nova Tunes | Volume 2.2 | |
| 38 | September 19 | Yannick Noah | Frontières | 22,230 | Zazie | Za7ie | |
| 39 | September 26 | Zazie | Za7ie | 20,400 | Raphaël | Pacific 231 | 2,100 |
| 40 | October 3 | Raphaël | Pacific 231 | 25,750 | Aloe Blacc | Good Things | 2,500 |
| 41 | October 10 | Soprano | La Colombe | 26,806 | AaRON | Birds In The Storm | 2,750 |
| 42 | October 17 | Soprano | La Colombe | 10,900 | Aloe Blacc | Good Things | 1,400 |
| 43 | October 24 | Eddy Mitchell | Come Back | 17,100 | Lady Gaga | The Fame Monster | 2,000 |
| 44 | October 31 | Shakira | Sale el Sol | 15,000 | Soundtrack | Les petits mouchoirs | 3,330 |
| 45 | November 7 | Shakira | Sale el Sol | 12,300 | Jamiroquai | Rock Dust Light Star | 4,200 |
| 46 | November 14 | Florent Pagny | Tout Et Son Contraire | 24,864 | James Blunt | Some Kind of Trouble | 2,600 |
| 47 | November 21 | Grégoire | Le Même Soleil | 23,559 | Rihanna | Loud | 3,500 |
| 48 | November 28 | Booba | Lunatic | 30,621 | Booba | Lunatic | 6,103 |
| 49 | December 5 | The Black Eyed Peas | The Beginning | 35,653 | Mylène Farmer | Bleu Noir | 9,129 |
| 50 | December 12 | Mylène Farmer | Bleu Noir | 139,176 | Daft Punk | Tron: Legacy | 3,976 |
| 51 | December 19 | Mylène Farmer | Bleu Noir | 81,649 | Mylène Farmer | Bleu Noir | 1,998 |
| 52 | December 26 | Mylène Farmer | Bleu Noir | 73,704 | Lady Gaga | The Fame Monster | 1,923 |

== Top best-selling singles and albums in 2010 ==
This is the 20 best-selling of singles, and albums in 2010.

=== Singles (Physical + Digital) ===
| Pos. | Artist | Title | Sales | Pos. | Artist | Title | Sales |
|---|---|---|---|---|---|---|---|
| 1 | Shakira feat. Freshlyground | "Waka Waka (This Time for Africa)" | 373,068 | 11 | Eminem feat. Rihanna | "Love the Way You Lie" | |
| 2 | Stromae | "Alors on danse" | 249,441 | 12 | Yolanda Be Cool & DCUP | "We No Speak Americano" | |
| 3 | René la Taupe | "Mignon Mignon" | 231,935 | 13 | Katy Perry | "California Gurls" | |
| 4 | Sexion d'Assaut | "Désolé" | 192,968 | 14 | K'Naan feat. Féfé | "Wavin' Flag" | |
| 5 | Kesha | "Tik Tok" | 178,866 | 15 | Zaz | "Je veux" | |
| 6 | Lady Gaga | "Bad Romance" | 159,506 | 16 | Lady Gaga | "Alejandro" | |
| 7 | Rihanna | "Only Girl (In the World)" | 144,900 | 17 | Lady Gaga feat. Beyoncé | "Telephone" | |
| 8 | Shakira feat. El Cata or Dizzee Rascal | "Loca" | 143,337 | 18 | Cœur de pirate feat. Julien Doré | "Pour un infidèle" | |
| 9 | Christophe Maé | "Dingue, dingue, dingue" | 137,899 | 19 | The Black Eyed Peas | "I Gotta Feeling" | |
| 10 | Taio Cruz | "Break Your Heart" | 136,893 | 20 | The Black Eyed Peas | "The Time (Dirty Bit)" | |

=== Albums (Physical + Digital) ===
| Pos. | Artist | Title | Sales | Pos. | Artist | Title | Sales |
|---|---|---|---|---|---|---|---|
| 1 | Christophe Maé | On Trace La Route | 575,152 | 11 | Sexion d'Assaut | L'École des points vitaux | 271,975 |
| 2 | Les Prêtres | Spiritus Dei | 547,840 | 12 | Cœur De Pirate | Cœur De Pirate | 241,471 |
| 3 | Les Enfoirés | La Crise De Nerfs ! | 433,674 | 13 | Shakira | Sale el Sol | 236,616 |
| 4 | Yannick Noah | Frontières | 433,644 | 14 | David Guetta | One More Love | 224,992 |
| 5 | Jean Ferrat | Best of | 387,579 | 15 | Les Enfoirés | Le Meilleur Des Enfoirés - 20 ans | 212,394 |
| 6 | Zaz | Zaz | 372,960 | 16 | Ben L'Oncle Soul | Ben L'Oncle Soul | |
| 7 | Lady Gaga | The Fame Monster | 366,748 | 17 | Michel Sardou | Être Une Femme 2010 | |
| 8 | Muse | The Resistance | 352,274 | 18 | Mozart, l'Opéra Rock | Mozart, l'Opéra Rock | |
| 9 | The Black Eyed Peas | The E.N.D. | 349,971 | 19 | The Black Eyed Peas | The Beginning | |
| 10 | Mylène Farmer | Bleu Noir | 328,783 | 20 | Sade | Soldier of Love | |

== See also ==
- 2010 in music
- List of number-one singles in France
- List of Top 100 singles of 2010 (France)
- List of artists who reached number one on the French Singles Chart
