= Désolé (Sexion d'Assaut song) =

Single by Sexion d'Assaut

from the album L'École des points vitaux
- Released: 12 April 2010
- Genre: French hip hop
- Length: 3:17
- Label: Wati B
- Producers: Renaud Rebillaud; Wisla

Sexion d'Assaut singles chronology
"Changement d'ambiance" (2010)	"Désolé" (2010)	"Wati by Night" (2011)

Music video
- "Désolé" on YouTube

"Désolé" (English: "Sorry") is a song by Sexion d'Assaut released on 12 April 2010, from the album L'École des points vitaux.

The single reached number one on the SNEP and became a top-ten hit in France and then the song stayed number one for seven weeks from 2 May to 13 June. Désolé is a gold single.

== Background and writing ==
Gims, as usual, had several melodies on his cell phone. Among other things, he had that of Désolé. He played it for the composer of the group Wisla, then played it on the piano. He keeps the instrumental, telling himself that he would put it on a mixtape and add shots to it from behind. He played the instrumental to Black M, Barack Adama and Dawala.

Black M called Gims crazy and came up with an idea to improve the product. He wanted Lefa, Gims, Black M and Barack Adama to each pose an 8 bar verse that would be separated from each other by the chorus. This piece created a little controversy following the sentence "When I see what this land of kouffar has done to you".

Désolé was a great success and the object of parodies like that of Les Guignols on 22 May 2012, the one on Raymond Domenech in NRJ's Le 6/9, or the parody of Kevin Razy with the "Sexion d'homo".

== Chart performance ==
The song has been a huge hit in France since its release on 12 April 2010 especially since it is a song from the album L'École des points vitaux which was released on 29 March 2010.

The song reached number one on the Syndicat National de l'Édition Phonographique and became a top-ten hit in France, where it reached number five on the Ultratop in Belgium, in France the son became the number one in digital singles category with 4,520 sales in 18 April, and then the song stayed number one for seven weeks from 2 May to 13 June. It has also achieved success in many African countries Because of the huge popularity of the group. In November 2010, the album L'École des points vitaux was certified triple platinum in France. It has sold nearly 400,000 copies. It is Maître Gims who signs most of the instrumentals on this CD. It achieved peak sales in the 14th week of the year 2010 with 2,720 copies sold in one week. The total number of sales reached 271,975 copies.

== Music video ==
Gims the lead vocalist of Sexion d'Assaut singing in "Désolé" music video.

The clip tells several stories. A young man is distressed by his parents (the mother is played by the actress nominated for César Awards, Isabelle Renauld) who are constantly arguing, so he decides to run away. Gims sings his verse behind the young man and the chorus. Barack Adama attends during his verse the search of a thug (IDR) who is embarked in front of his parents.

Lefa is alongside the father of the young man who runs away. They are looking for the young. The latter meets a friend and they go to the studio. Black M puts down his verse and the friend of the young man who runs away receives a call from his mother who tells him that his sister is in the hospital. But this friend does not answer because he is busy. When he realizes this, he runs to the hospital with the runaway youth, who then understands the importance of his parents and returns home saying "Désolé".

== Charts ==
Chart (2010)	Peak position
France (SNEP)	61
France Digital Chart	1
Belgium (Ultratop 50 Wallonia)	5
Belgium (Ultratop 50 Flanders)	12
Switzerland (Schweizer Hitparade)	15
Austria (Ö3 Austria Top 40)	29
Germany (Official German Charts)	18

== Certifications ==
Region	Certification	Certified units/sales
Belgium (BRMA)	Gold	15,000^{*}
France (SNEP)	Gold	150,000^{*}
Germany (BVMI)	Platinum	300,000^{‡}
Switzerland (IFPI Switzerland)	Gold	15,000^{^}
^{*} Sales figures based on certification alone.^{^} Shipments figures based on certification alone.^{‡} Sales+streaming figures based on certification alone.

== See also ==
- Sexion d'Assaut discography
- List of top 10 singles in 2010 (France)
- List of top 100 singles of 2010 (France)
- List of number-one singles of 2010 (France)
