= Maska (rapper) =

French rapper and dancer (born 1985)

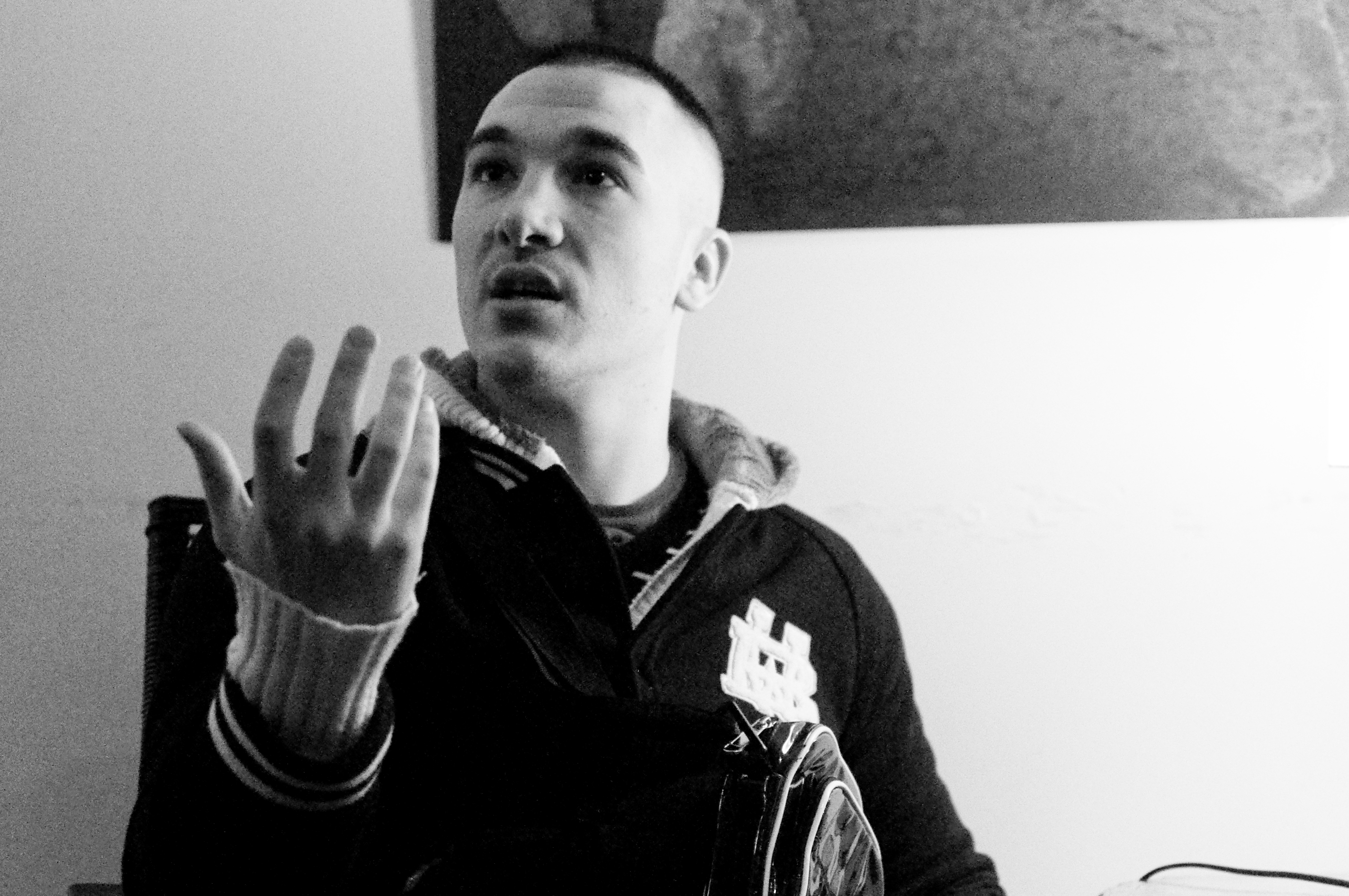

Background information
- Also known as: Le Blanc
- Born: Bastien Vincent; 21 May 1985 (age 41); Paris, France
- Genres: Hip hop
- Occupations: Rapper, singer, songwriter, dancer
- Years active: 2002–present
- Label: Loyauté, Amour & Biff
- Formerly of: Sexion d'Assaut

Bastien Vincent, known by his stage name Maska (born 21 May 1985 in Paris), is a French rapper and dancer. He is a founding member of the French hip-hop band Sexion d'Assaut.

In October 2014, Maska released his first solo album, Espace-temps, which ranked 14th on the Top Albums in France.

== Early life ==
Originally from Lozère, he grew up in Paris in the 9th arrondissement while mingling with his friends, most of whom would later become part of the hip hop group Sexion d'Assault. He grew up in a rich neighborhood despite his family having a substandard income, an early situation in Bastien's life which would leave him with feelings of unease. Having experienced a musical awakening quite young thanks to his parents, Maska became a fan of French rap who, unlike Gims, ended up receiving a rather American musical education, influenced by Sisqó, Michael Jackson, The Beatles, The Rolling Stones and Johnny Clegg .

== Career ==
=== Sexion d'Assaut (2002–2013) ===
Around 2003, Maska obtained his baccalaureate and proceeded to undertake higher studies. He wrote songs and rapped alongside his acquaintances Black M and Barack Adama. He mentioned having been saved by music and religion in the lyrics of his single "La tâche".

Maska released several records with the group Sexion d'Assaut, including two studio albums, L'École des points vitaux in 2010 and L'Apogée in 2012, as well as three mixtapes, two street albums, a live album, three DVDs, a compilation and a reissue.

=== Solo career (2012–present) ===
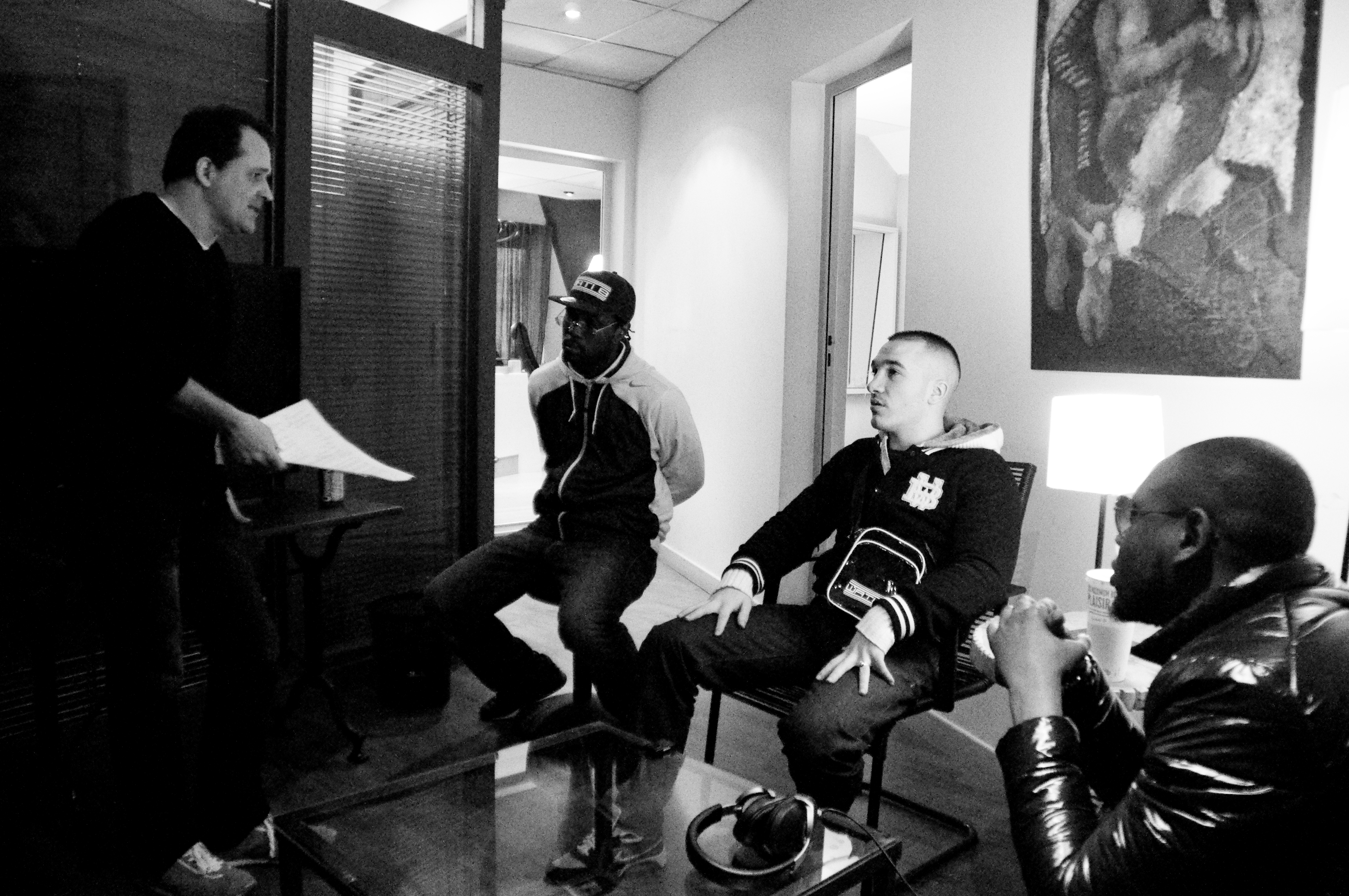
Maska (center-right) with members of Sexion d'Assaut, 2012.

After the success of the Sexion d'Assaut, in October 2014, Maska released his first solo album entitled Espace-temps, which ranked 14th on the Top Albums in France. Before the release of the album, he uploaded the music video for the song "Rahh". He also offered a series of videos, Espace temps, including: "Mon mal être" (feat. Dr Bériz), "Un grain de folie", "Ca va rire", "Parcours de rêve", and "Laisse passer l'artiste". On March 14, 2014, Maska unveiled the first track of his next album "Drapeau Taché de Sang".

During the French program Planète Rap with Black M, he also unveiled an extract from a new song entitled "Prie pour moi" featuring Gims, which was released fully on the Internet on May 9, 2014. After more than two years of work, on October 13, 2017, he revealed his first mixtape, Akhal-Teke, followed by a second one, Préliminaires, Vol. 1, released on June 29, 2018, where he introduced a radical change of style. From September 2018, he worked on his third mixtape, Préliminaires Vol. 2, which was released on March 29, 2019.

== Achievements ==
Subliminal of Gims, "Où Est Ton Arme?". Being a founding member of the Sexion d'Assaut group, Maska takes part in many of the collective's most notable songs: "Avant qu'elle parte", "Ma Direction", "Problèmes D'Adultes", "Cérémonie", "A Bout de souffle" or even "Ils appellent ça".

Maska contributes to the writing of collective lyrics, collaborating frequently with French singers such as Kendji Girac, Vianney, Dadju or Zaho.

== Discography ==
=== With Sexion d'Assaut ===
Studio albums

- L'École des points vitaux (2010)
- L'Apogée (2012)

Compilation albums

- La Terre du Milieu (2006)
- Les Chroniques du 75 (2009)
- En attendant L'Apogée: les Chroniques du 75 (2011)

Mixtapes

- Le Renouveau (2008)
- L'Écrasement de tête (2009)

Live albums

- L'Apogée à Bercy (2012)

=== Albums ===
Title	Album details	Peak positions		Sales	Certifications
Title	Album details	FR	BEL (Wa)	Sales	Certifications
Espace-temps	Released: October 20, 2014; Label: Wati B, Sony Music; Formats: CD, digital download	99	134	FRA: 5,000	—N/a

=== Mixtapes ===
Title	EP details
Akhal-Teké	Released: October 13, 2017; Label: Wati B, Sony Music; Formats: CD, digital download
Préliminaires, Vol. 1	Released: June 29, 2018; Label: Wati B, Sony Music; Formats: CD, digital download
Préliminaires, Vol. 2	Released: March 29, 2019; Label: Wati B, Sony Music; Formats: CD, digital download

=== EPs ===
Title	EP details
En attendant Espace-Temps	Released: 2014; Label: Wati B, Sony Music; Formats: CD, digital download
Étoiles de Jour, Part 1	Released: 2021; Label: Maska Prod, BMG France; Formats: CD, digital download
Étoiles de Jour, Part 2	Released: 2021; Label: Maska Prod, BMG France; Formats: CD, digital download

=== Singles ===
Title	Year	Peak positions		Album
Title	Year	FR	BEL (Wa)	Album
"Loin des ennuis" (feat. The Shin Sekaï)	2013	163	–	En attendant Espace Temps
"Prie pour moi" (feat. Maître Gims)	2014	50	44* (Ultratip)	Espace-temps
"Profiter de ma life" (feat. Black M & Docteur Beriz)	2014	62	–	Espace-temps

*Did not appear in the official Belgian Ultratop 50 charts, but rather in the bubbling under Ultratip charts.

=== Featured in ===
Title	Year	Peak positions	Album
Title	Year	FR	Album
"Où est ton arme" (Gims feat. Maska)	2013	163	Gims album Subliminal
