= Lefa (rapper) =

French rapper and dancer (born 1985)

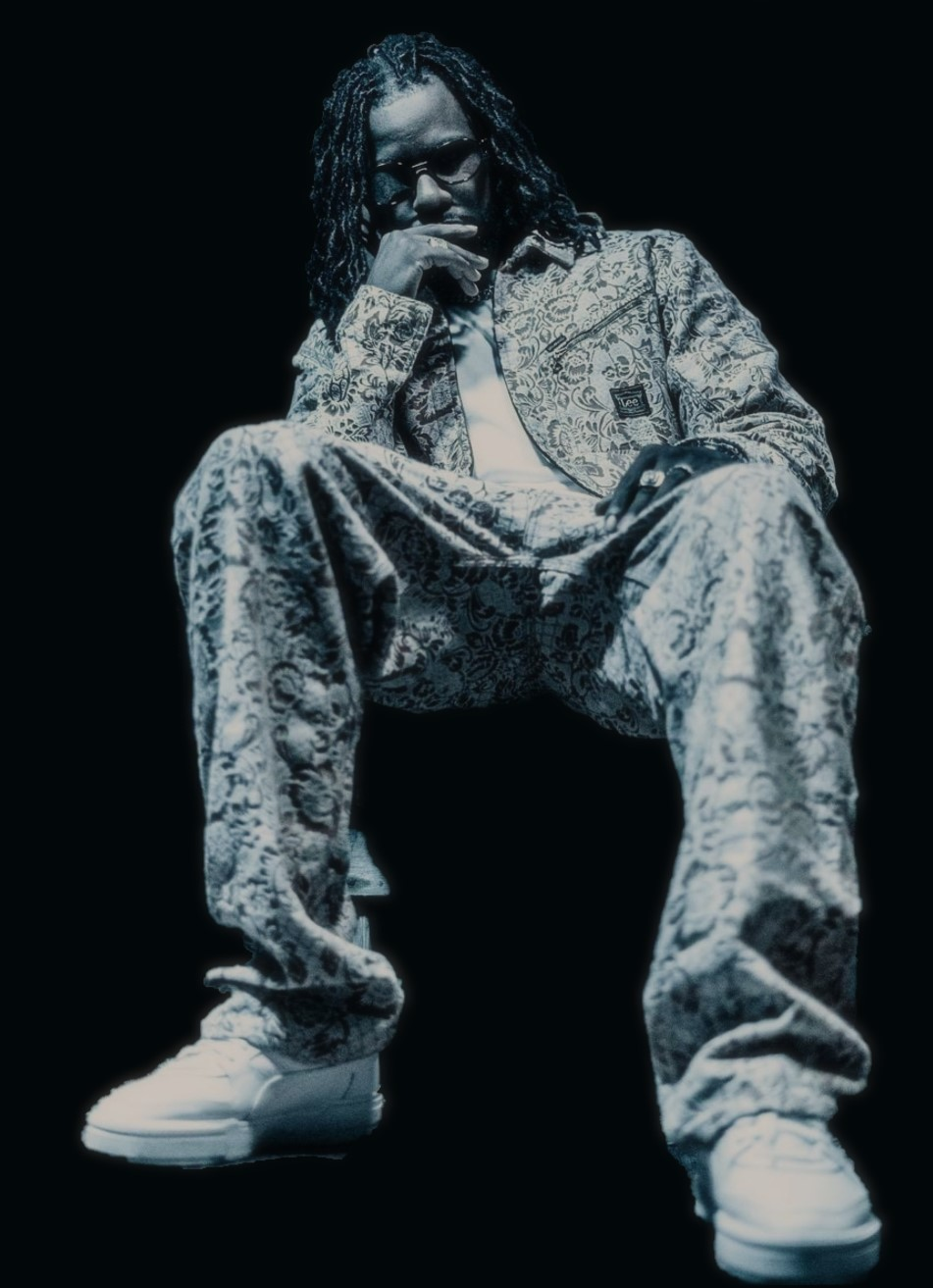
- Lefa in 2021

Background information
- Born: Abdel Karim Fall; 28 November 1985 (age 40)
- Genres: Hip hop
- Occupations: Rapper; singer; dancer
- Years active: 2002–
- Labels: WATI B, 2L Music

Abdel Karim Fall, better known by his stage name Lefa (born 28 November 1985 in Paris), is a French rapper, singer and dancer. He is a founding member of the French rap / hip hop collective Sexion d'Assaut. He has also released solo materials in 2015 and 2016. In June 2015 he released his debut solo album Monsieur Fall with big commercial success.

He was born to the Senegalese jazz musician Cheikh Tidiane Fall and his mother was a French choreographer and art therapist Christiane de Rougemont. He grew up in the 18e arrondissement of Paris and his beginnings were in breakdance.

He has closely collaborated with artists Black M and Gims, also members of Sexion d'Assaut, appearing on many of their albums. His friend Maître Gims named him Lefa (French slang for Fall, Lefa's family name). Later in 2013, he was reintroduced back in taking part in their 2013 tour but at much lower key, with Lefa deciding to concentrate more on his solo work. 2015-2016 was a veritable comeback with the release of the single "Quelques minutes" in 2015 and the album Monsieur Fall in February 2016.

== Early life ==
Born of a Senegalese jazz musician father, Cheikh Tidiane Fall and a French choreographer and art therapist mother, Christiane de Rougemont, he grew up in rue des Abbesses located in Paris in the 18th arrondissement. During his teenage years he practiced dance, more specifically break dance. Before founding Sexion d'Assaut, he was part of another group called Assonance with Scrib'R, M.K.X, Maska, L.I.O. Petrodollars and Barack Adama.

== Career ==
=== Sexion d'Assaut (2002–2012) ===
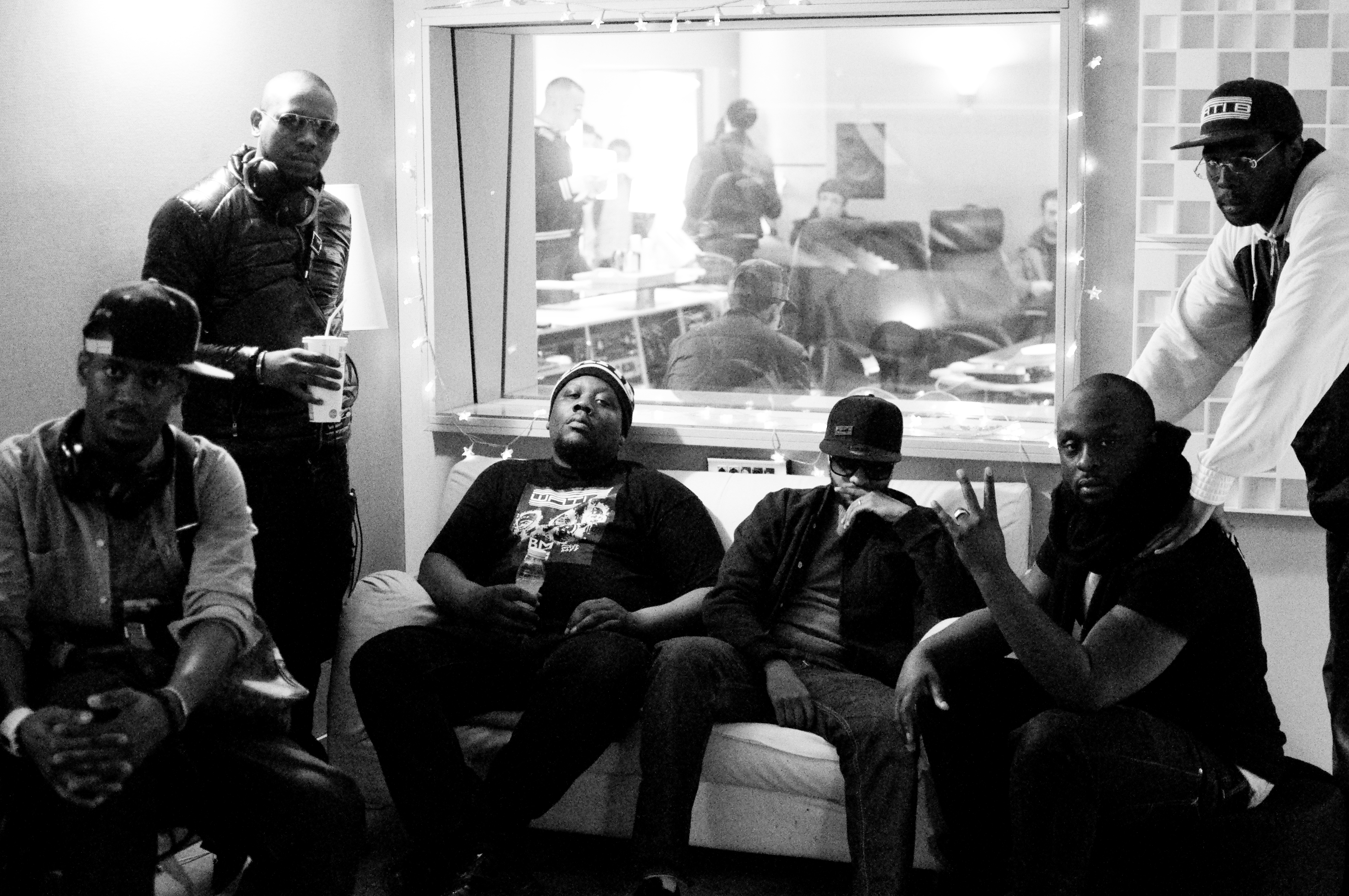
Lefa (third from right) With La Sexion d'Assaut in 2012.

Lefa is one of the first members of the Sexion d'Assaut, of which he is also one of the founders. It was Gims who baptized him Lefa (verlan de Fall). He is the member who made homophobic remarks during an interview in June 2010, which shocks and casts suspicion on the whole group.

The group then declared “not knowing the meaning of the word 'homophobic'”. Following the controversy, the group multiplied mea culpas and worked for militant anti-homophobia associations. In March 2012, the group released the studio album entitled L'Apogée. This is the last album in which Lefa appears with the group. After that, he left with his family to live in Morocco.

=== Absence ans Monsieur Fall (2012–2016) ===
During 2012, Lefa no longer appears on stage with the other members of the collective, the group says he is “on a musical break” to devote himself to his personal life, but promises a return soon.

At the end of March 2013, Gims announced a possible return of Lefa in the Sexion d'Assaut during the 2013 tour. The latter confided in an interview that he would explain in his autobiography, released in 2015, this mysterious departure:

"I have said I was going to explain why he was away. He is a music lover although he decided to take a step back. It's always been a guy like that Lefa. He often stopped, started again, stopped. There, he is in his period when he stopped, he is posed with his family. He had arranged it like this. But, out of respect for all the fans who follow us, we haven't talked about it openly, we haven't done any official stuff. I think it's best to explain this in a book".

On 5 June 2015, in Planète Rap on Skyrock radio, the singer Black M presents a “surprise” recording in which Lefa participates on the extract entitled Intro; However, Black M remains elusive about a possible return and states that audiences are going to have to brace themselves for a musical event originating from Lefa that will occur in the days to come. On 22 July 2015, Lefa appeared on the title "Longue vie" featuring Gims, the fourth single from the latter's album, Mon cœur avait raison. On 18 September 2015, Lefa published a second extract A few minutes. On 16 October 2015, he unveiled his third single "Masterchef". On 13 November 2015, he announced that the release of his first solo album, Monsieur Fall, was scheduled for 29 January 2016. The fourth 20 years single was unveiled on 19 November 2015. One week before the album's release, on 22 January 2016, he unveiled the fifth single "En terrasse". At the same time, he unveils a series of clips from his #TMCP project (Tu m'connais pas).

He released his first solo album, titled Monsieur Fall, on 29 January 2016, which sold 10,800 copies during its first week of operation. On 16 March 2016, he posted a new clip, but this time a featuring, it is the title "Dernier arrêt.". A month later, on 16 April 2016, the clip for "Rappelle-la" was released. Lefa published on 27 June 2016 the clip of "Reste branché" with Sexion d'Assaut, the second featuring of his album that he posted on YouTube. A month later, the clip for "Grandi trop vite" came out on 29 July. The album is now certified gold. In 2016, Dawala, creator of the Wati B label, confirms the group's return in 2017, but it will not be.

=== #TMCP and Visionnaire (2016–2017) ===
A few months after the release of Monsieur Fall, the album was certified gold. On 23 September 2016, Lefa released her first mixtape titled #TMCP, all of the songs of which are clipped ("On est en guerre", "Kiss Me", "Ça va mal terminer"...). Throughout 2017, he presented several singles associated with clips in anticipation of his second album. Thus, the rapper unveils Visionnaire on 3 February 2017, "Sang froid" on 6 March (and clipped on 27 March 2017), "Popstar" on 5 May 2017, "Rouler" featuring S. Pri Noir on 30 June 2017, then "Bi Chwiya" on 18 August 2017.

On 14 August 2017, Lefa officially announced the release of his second solo album entitled Visionnaire, available a little over a month later, on 22 September 2017. Between the end of August and the beginning of September, Lefa balances a series of mini freestyles of around 1 minute in length, in order to further promote his album, the release of which is preceded by the single Chaud (13 September 2017). 22 September is D-Day: after seven and a half months of communication on songs that have worked less on YouTube and radio than the extracts of Monsieur Fall, the famous and long-awaited Visionnaire is finally revealed. A month after the release of Visionnaire Lefa released the music video for "Solitaire" (27 October 2017). In October, he officially announced a concert in Paris at La Maroquinerie on 14 December 2017. During the concert, the Sexion d'Assaut met in full, also counting on the presence in particular of H Magnum, Dadju and Franglish. On 11 January 2018, after a long year 2017, he released the video for "Fais Le" which brings together the best moments of Lefa filmed during this long year (Such as his trip to London, The concert in Paris, the rehearsal weeks, the sessions recording, etc.).

=== 3 du mat (2018) ===
Barely a few months after the release of Visionnaire, Lefa began releasing videos on his social networks: 24 February 01:00:00, then a few days near 02:00:00, then released 03:00:00, announcing his new album 3 du mat. On 7 March the first single "CDM", with a music video, is released. On 23 March, the song "Potentiel" was released in collaboration with Orelsan, the clip of which was released a week later. On 6 April the album 3 du mat is released. In one week he sold 5,704 copies. Later on 30 April, Lefa returns to the playlist of radios such as Skyrock, Générations ... With the song "Paradise" in collaboration with Lomepal (produced by MKL) whose clip will be released a few weeks later (21 May 2018) and will accumulate more than '1 Million views in 1 week (5 million views 1 month later). The featuring has a big success since it is certified gold single in October. On 19 October, he released the clip of "J'me Téléporte" with Dadju and S.Pri Noir which will accumulate more than 250,000 views in 1 day and 1 million in 1 week. The album was certified gold by the Syndicat National de l'Édition Phonographique on 15 June 2020 with more than 50,000 sales.

=== Fame and D M N R (2019–2021) ===
In 2019, Lefa left the Wati B label but remained on the site. He then created his own label "2L Music" and released by surprise his Extended play Next album est dans mon phone, 24 April.

On 26 June, he released his new single "Fame", the first single from his fourth solo album. then the second single "Bitch" featuring rapper Vald who will meet with enormous success and which will enter the Playlist on many radio stations 1 year after "Paradise". On 27 September a teaser announces the official release of his new album Fame to be released on 18 October 2019. The video reveals the featuring with Dosseh, Caballero & JeanJass, Tayc, Megaski or even Abou Tall. On 10 October the track "Bitch" was certified gold single 3 months after its release. On 16 October 2 days before the album's release, Lefa released the short film Mauvais which will be the third and last single from Fame before its release. The album sold 6200 copies the first week. He says in the song "Spécial" with Dosseh that the clips are too expensive and they therefore decide to replace them with lives ("Pause", "Maniaque" or "Château de Versailles"). He later released the video for Special followed by the video for T’y Arrais pas.

On 10 July 2020, Lefa is releasing Famous, a reissue of Fame. The album sold 6049 units including 1039 physical during the first week. The clip "Smile" in collaboration with SCH comes out the same evening of the album's release. On Wednesday 31 March 2021, Lefa announces on its networks the release of a surprise album entitled D M N R (Minesweeper) with a poignant teaser in which we hear him kicked on drill. On 2 April 2021, the album D M N R was released, just one day after announcing it via Twitter. Several guests appear on the album such as Kalash Criminel and Captaine Roshi. A suite of D M N R, titled CODE PIN, is scheduled for 9 July, with only one featuring a track with Tayc.

== Controversies ==
=== Homophobia ===
In June 2010, during an official interview in the magazine International Hip-Hop, Lefa (a member of the group) said: “For a while, we attacked homosexuals a lot because we are one hundred percent homophobic and that 'we assume it ”as well as“ for us, the fact of being homosexual is a deviance which is not tolerable ”and that“ homosexuality is far from our practices. We don't understand it. We come from an environment where there is none ”. Two of the group's songs contain the following lyrics: "I think it is high time that queers perish, cut off their penises, leave the dead, found on the ring road (in the song "On t'a humilié" Gone are the days when homosexuals made up themselves in scred All these practices are not healthy (in the song "Cessez le feu")."

== Discography ==
=== With Sexion d'Assaut ===
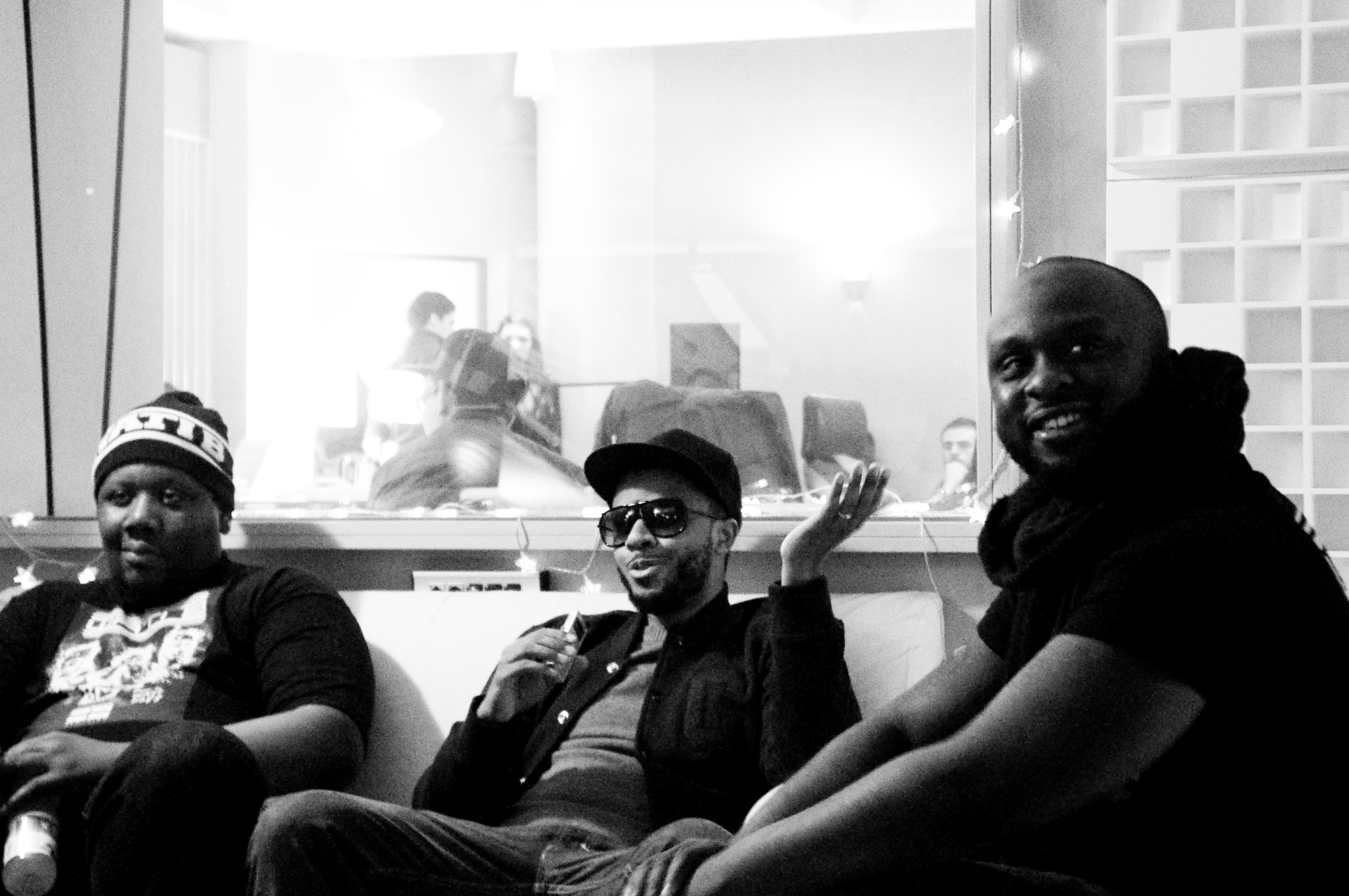
Members of Sexion d'Assaut: JR O Crom, Lefa and Barack Adama.

Studio albums

- L'École des points vitaux (2010)
- L'Apogée (2012)

Compilation albums

- La Terre du Milieu (2006)
- Les Chroniques du 75 (2009)
- En attendant L'Apogée: les Chroniques du 75 (2011)

Mixtapes

- Le Renouveau (2008)
- L'Écrasement de tête (2009)

Live albums

- L'Apogée à Bercy (2012)

=== Albums ===
| Album | Album details | Peak positions | | | | Certification |
| Album | Album details | FR | BEL (Fl) | BEL (Wa) | SWI | Certification |
|---|---|---|---|---|---|---|
| Monsieur Fall | Released: January 29, 2016; Label: Wati B, Jive Epic, Sony Music; Formats: CD, digital download | 4 | 140 | 10 | 19 | FRA: Gold |
| Visionnaire | Released: September 22, 2017; Label: Wati B, Jive Epic, Sony Music; Formats: CD, digital download | 26 | — | 37 | — | —N/a |
| 3 du mat | Released: April 6, 2018; Label: Wati B; Formats: CD, digital download | 14 | — | 32 | 99 | —N/a |
| Fame | Released: October 18, 2019; Label: 2L Music, RCA, Sony Music; Formats: CD, digital download | 3 | 139 | 11 | 32 | —N/a |
| D M N R | Released: April 2, 2021; Label: 2L Music, RCA, Sony Music; Formats: CD, digital download | 24 | — | 22 | 41 | —N/a |

=== EPs ===
| Year | EP | Peak positions |
| Year | EP | BEL (Wa) |
|---|---|---|
| 2019 | Next album est dans mon phone | —N/a |
| 2021 | Code pin | 82 |
| 2021 | Fall Season | 96 |

=== Singles ===
| Year | Song | Peak positions | Album |
| Year | Song | FR | Album |
|---|---|---|---|
| 2015 | "Quelques minutes" | 36 | Monsieur Fall |
| 2015 | "Masterchef" | 72 | Monsieur Fall |
| 2015 | "20 ans" | 73 | Monsieur Fall |
| 2016 | "En terrasse" | 104 | Monsieur Fall |
| 2016 | "Reste branché" (featuring Sexion d'Assaut) | 200 | Monsieur Fall |
| 2017 | "Visonnaire" | 166 | Visionnaire |
| 2017 | "Rouler" (featuring S.Pri Noir) | 134 | Visionnaire |
| 2017 | "Bi Chwiya" | 140 | Visionnaire |
| 2019 | "Bitch" (featuring Vald) | 10 | Fame |

=== Featured in ===
| Year | Song | Peak positions | Album |
| Year | Song | FR | Album |
|---|---|---|---|
| 2015 | "Longue vie" (Gims featuring Lefa) | 52 | Mon cœur avait raison |

=== Other charted songs ===
| Year | Song | Peak positions | Album |
| Year | Song | FR | Album |
|---|---|---|---|
| 2019 | "Mauvais" | 41 | Fame |
| 2019 | "Fame" | 130 | Fame |
| 2019 | "Spécial" (featuring Dosseh) | 139 | Fame |
| 2019 | "Pause" | 142 | Fame |
| 2019 | "T'y arrivais pas" | 152 | Fame |
| 2019 | "Nouveau maillot" | 160 | Fame |
| 2019 | "Sors de ma tête" | 172 | Fame |
| 2019 | "Batman" | 188 | Fame |
| 2021 | "Roddy Ricch" | 152 | Code pin |
| 2021 | "Sorry" (feat. Tayc) | 191 | Code pin |

== Awards and nominations ==
| Award Ceremony | Year | Nominated work | Category | Result |
|---|---|---|---|---|
| Berlin Music Video Awards | 2020 | Bitch | Best Director | Nominated |
| Berlin Music Video Awards | 2020 | MAUVAIS | Best VFX | Nominated |
