= L'Apogée =

Studio album by Sexion d'Assaut
- Released: 5 March 2012
- Recorded: 2011
- Genres: French rap, pop, house
- Length: 76:35
- Label: Wati B

Sexion d'Assaut chronology
En attendant L'Apogée: les Chroniques du 75 (2011)	L'Apogée (2012)	Le Retour des Rois (Canceled)

Singles from L'Apogée
- 1. "Mets pas celle là" Released: 11 December 2011; 2. "Disque d'or" Released: 30 December 2011; 3. "Avant qu'elle parte" Released: 5 January 2012; 4. "Ma direction" Released: 5 March 2012; 5. "Wati House" Released: 24 March 2012; 6. "Africain" Released: 6 July 2012; 7. "Problèmes d'adultes" Released: 15 November 2012

L’Apogée is the third official album by French rap group Sexion d'Assaut composed of Maître Gims, Lefa, Barack Adama, Maska, JR O Crom, Black M, Doomams, and L.I.O. Petrodollars. This album was released on 5 March 2012, in stores and available for download.

== History ==
In November 2011, an unofficial date for the album's release was announced for 20 February 2012 but on 17 December 2011, the official date was unveiled as 5 March 2012. The first title unveiled by the band is "Mets pas celle là", 11 December 2011 (after the 'Welcome To The Wa' video shot in the album's laboratory, an isolated place in Normandy). The second title unveiled on 30 December 2011 (after the Welcome To The Wa II video) is Gold Disc. The third single from L'Apogée is announced by Lefa during the Planète Rap special 22 May in Bercy for Thursday 5 January 2012. It does not however give the name, Maska simply specifying that this song will be "sentimentally strong". On 5 January, the third single from the album, "Avant qu'elle parte", was released.

The Apogée is a diamond disc with more than 500,000 copies sold. The album has since sold more than 700,000 copies. L'Apogée is their last appearance on the album released with French rappers Maître Gims, L.I.O. Pétrodollars and Barack Adama, after the departure of the Wati B.

== Track listing ==
No.	Title	Writer(s)	Producer(s)	Length
1.	"Mets pas celle-là"	Maître Gims; Lefa; Maska; Jr O Crom; Doomams; Barack Adama; Black M	Soulchildren; Wati B	3:57
2.	"Ma direction"	Maître Gims; Lefa; Barack Adama; Maska	Stan-E; Wati B	4:23
3.	"Disque d'or"	Maître Gims; Barack Adama; Jr O Crom; Lefa; Black M	Stan-E; Wati B	4:38
4.	"L'endurance"	Lefa; Barack Adama	Stan-E; Wati B	4:53
5.	"Melrose Place" (feat. L.I.O Pétrodollars)	Maître Gims; Lefa; Barack Adama; Black M; L.I.O Pétrodollars	Renaud Rebillaud; Wati B	3:58
6.	"Balader"	Maître Gims; Lefa; Jr O Crom; Barack Adama; Black M	Stan-E; Wati B	4:04
7.	"Africain"	Maître Gims; Lefa; Barack Adama; Doomams; Black M	Stan-E; Wati B	4:08
8.	"Assez" (feat. Dry)	Maître Gims; Lefa; Dry; Doomams; Maska	Stan-E; Wati B	3:07
9.	"La tâche"	Maska; Black M	Stan-E; Wati B	4:46
10.	"J'suis pas dans l'game" (feat. Dr. Bériz)	Maître Gims; Lefa; Black M; Dr. Beriz	Stan-E; Wati B	4:21
11.	"Avant qu'elle parte"	Maître Gims; Lefa; Maska; Jr O Crom; Doomams; Barack Adama; Black M	Stan-E; Wati B	4:33
12.	"Rien de méchant" (feat. H Magnum)	Maître Gims; Jr O Crom; Barack Adama; H Magnum; Black M	Renaud Rebillaud; Wati B	4:32
13.	"À cœur ouvert"	Jr O Crom; Doomams	Stan-E	4:43
14.	"Paname allons danser"	Maître Gims; Black M; Lefa; Barack Adama	Stan-E; Wati B	6:09
15.	"Wati House"	Maître Gims; Lefa; Black M; Jr O Crom; Barack Adama	Renaud Rebillaud; Wati B	4:16
16.	"-75 degrés"	Maître Gims; Maska; Doomams	Renaud Rebillaud; Wisla; Wati B	6:13
17.	"J'reste debout"	Maître Gims; Lefa; Black M; Barack Adama; Doomams	Stan-E; Wati B	3:55
Total length:				76:35

Deluxe
No.	Title	Writer(s)	Producer(s)	Length
1.	"Prévenez les haineux" (feat. L.I.O Pétrodollars)	Barack Adama; Jr O Crom; Maître Gims; Black M; Lefa; L.I.O Pétrodollars	Stan E; Wati-B	5:10
2.	"Problèmes d'adultes"	Barack Adama; Maître Gims; Black M; Maska; Lefa	Stan E; Wati-B	3:58
3.	"En direct de la Lune"	Barack Adama; Maître Gims; Black M; Lefa; Jr O Crom	Stan E; Wati-B	4:43
4.	"Laissez moi ivre"	Black M; Jr O Crom; Doomams	Shuko	3:33
5.	"Mets pas celle-là (Instrumental)"		Wati-B; Soulchildren	3:58
Total length:				21:30

Réédition
No.	Title	Writer(s)	Producer(s)	Length
1.	"Cérémonie" (feat. Dry)	Jr O Crom; Doomams; Black M; Dry; Maska	Wati-B; Kore	3:52
2.	"On t'a dit" (feat. L.I.O Pétrodollars & L'Institut)	Jr O Crom; Black M; Doomams; L.I.O Pétrodollars; Dr. Beriz; Insolent	Wati-B; Bellek	4:20
Total length:				8:13

== Charts ==
=== Weekly charts ===
Chart (2012)	Peak position
Belgian Albums (Ultratop Flanders)	75
Belgian Albums (Ultratop Wallonia)	1
French Albums (SNEP)	1
Swiss Albums (Schweizer Hitparade)	15

=== Year-end charts ===
Chart (2012)	Position
Belgian Albums (Ultratop Wallonia)	2
French Albums (SNEP)	3
Swiss Albums (Schweizer Hitparade)	61

Chart (2013)	Position
Belgian Albums (Ultratop Wallonia)	31
French Albums (SNEP)	28
Swiss Albums (Schweizer Hitparade)	100

=== Certification ===
Country	Certification
France (SNEP)	Diamant
Belgium (Ultratop)	Platinum
Switzerland (IFPI)	Gold

== Track list: L'Apogée à Bercy ==
L'Apogée à Bercy

Live album by Sexion d'Assaut
- Released: 19 November 2012
- Venues: Accor Arena, Paris, France
- Genre: French hip-hop
- Label: Wati B / Jive Records

L'Apogée à Bercy (English: L'Apogée in Bercy) is the only live album by French rap group Sexion d'Assaut recorded on 19 November 2012 at the Accor Arena, Paris, France. on the Wati B and Jive Records labels. The group performed songs from their album L'Apogée And songs from the first album L'École des points vitaux And songs from the compilation album En attendant L'Apogée: les Chroniques du 75.

No.	Title	Length
1.	"Disque D'or"	05:28
2.	"T'es bête ou quoi ?"	01:18
3.	"A bout d'souffle"	03:43
4.	"Balader"	04:18
5.	"J'ai pas les loves"	06:25
6.	"Changement d'ambiance"	05:02
7.	"Breh"	04:16
8.	"Africain"	04:15
9.	"Casquette a l'envers"	03:54
10.	"Prévenez les haineux" (feat. L.I.O. Pétrodollars)	05:10
11.	"J'suis pas dans le gâme" (feat. Dr. Beriz)	04:38
12.	"Qui t'a dit"	04:32
13.	"Plus qu'un son"	04:23
14.	"Problèmes D'adultes"	04:12
15.	"J'reste Debout"	03:46
16.	"Paname Allons Danser"	05:58
17.	"Paris va bien"	04:08
18.	"Wati Bon Son"	04:08
19.	"Sahbi"	04:18
20.	"Assez"	03:26
21.	"Wati by night"	08:47
22.	"Ma Direction"	05:17
23.	"Désolé"	03:20
24.	"Wati house"	04:56
25.	"Avant qu'elle parte"	05:23

=== Charts ===
Chart (2012)	Position
French Albums (SNEP)	17
