= Les chroniques du Wati Boss =

Les chroniques du Wati Boss is a compilation album series of Wati B artists. On 8 July 2013, Volume 1 was released followed by Volume 2 on 12 September 2014.

== Volume 1 ==
Les chroniques du Wati Boss - Volume 1

Compilation album by Various artists
- Released: 8 July 2013
- Recorded: Various times
- Genre: Rap, Hip hop
- Label: Wati-B; Sony Music Entertainment France (exclusive licence)

Series chronology
Les chroniques du Wati Boss - Volume 1 (2013)	Les chroniques du Wati Boss – Volume 2 (2014)

Track #	Artist / Band / Collective	Song title	Length
1.	Dawala	"Intro"	1:40
2.	Jr O Crom & Doomams feat. Orishas	"Es la vida"	4:08
3.	Lynda	"Si mes rêves"	3:47
4.	Black M	"De quoi faire jaqueter"	4:11
5.	Red Cross	"Soirée d'été"	4:05
6.	Dry	"Je fonce"	3:28
7.	Jr O Crom, Charly Bell & Doomams	"Niereh"	4:20
8.	Maska feat. Shin Sekaï	"Loin des ennuis"	4:28
9.	Jr O Crom, Doomams & Dry	"Casse la démarche"	4:42
10.	Maître Gims feat. Charly Bell	"Bavon"	3:06
11.	Maska	"Lève ton verre"	3:38
12.	Lio Petrodollars feat. Abou Tall & Docteur Berize	"Marche avec les boss"	3:44
13.	Jr O Crom & Doomams	"Bienvenue dans le wa"	4:11
14.	L'Institut feat. Dadju	"Gauche / Droite"	4:05
15.	Dry feat. Ferre Gola	"J'ai tout donné"	4:31
16.	Maître Gims	"Le retour de e.t."	1:45
17.	Jr O Crom, Doomams, Black M & Dry	"Col en v"	3:42
18.	Black M & Dadju	"Foncés grosses lèvres"	5:14
19.	Maître Gims feat. L'Institut	"Hasta la vista"	4:11
20.	Red Cross	"Un jour j'y arriverai"	3:04

== Volume 2 ==
Les chroniques du Wati Boss – Volume 2

Compilation album by Various artists
- Released: 11 August 2014 (digital); 12 September 2014 (physical)
- Recorded: Various times
- Genre: Rap, Hip hop
- Label: Wati-B; Sony Music Entertainment France (exclusive licence)

Series chronology
Les chroniques du Wati Boss – Volume 1 (2013)	Les chroniques du Wati Boss – Volume 2 (2014)

=== Track list ===
1.	Dawala	"Intro"	1:44
2.	Shin Sekaï, Dry, Abou Debeing, Docteur Beriz	"Billet facile"	3:42
3.	Docteur Beriz, Dry, JR O Chrome, Lio Pétrodollars	"Madame la chance"	4:36
4.	DJ HCue feat. Abou Tall, Dadju, Johnk, Abou Debeing	"Tout s'efface"	3:39
5.	Doomams, JR O Chrome, Dry, Docteur Beriz	"Cool"	4:00
6.	Shin Sekaï, Docteur Beriz, Lynda	"À la recherche du bonheur"	4:05
7.	Red Cross	"Wati Family"	4:07
8.	Red Cross	"CDWB"	4:06
9.	Dadju, Dry, JR O Chrome, Docteur Beriz	"Balisé"	4:14
10.	Lio Pétrodollars feat. JR O Chrome	"Boulevard de la hess"	3:53
11.	Red Cross feat. Dry	"Ne me juge pas"	4:25
12.	Biwai feat. Docteur Beriz	"Aller de l'avant"	3:55
13.	Charly Bell	"Pousse la fonte"	3:05
14.	JR O Chrome, Doomams, Charly Bell	"J'ai toujours su"	3:45
15.	Lynda feat. Dry	"À ma place"	3:33
16.	Lynda -	"Je décolle"	3:13
17.	Lio Petrodollars feat. Dadju	"Immensité"	3:24
18.	Charly Bell feat. Lynda	"Fever"	3:09
19.	JR O Chrome, Doomams, Abou Tall, Docteur Beriz	"Mes amis"	3:33
20.	Black M	"Gangster"	4:13

== Charts ==
=== Volume 1 ===
Chart (2013)	Peak position
Ultratop (Belgian (Flanders) Albums Chart)	172
Ultratop (Belgian (Wallonia) Albums Chart)	11
SNEP (French Albums Chart)	7

=== Volume 2 ===
Chart (2014)	Peak position
Ultratop (Belgian (Wallonia) Albums Chart)	21
SNEP (French Albums Chart)	4
