= Booska-P =

French News Magazine

Booska-P (styled as BOOSKA►P) is an online news magazine focusing on rap and urban cultures, with a bigger focus on France, notably by producing video content (interviews, music videos, etc.). The site also covers other areas such as American rap, cinema, and football. The team planned to launch BooskAfrica in January 2017 to cover the rap scene in Africa.

== History ==
Booska-P was launched online on October 31, 2005, by Fif Tobossi, a rap enthusiast from Courcouronnes, and his friends Alexis Nouaille and Amadou Ba. The site's name is a reference to Buscapé, a character from City of God. Their initial idea was to focus on producing rap-related videos. The first video uploaded was of the rapper Sinik and attracted 2,500 visitors on its first day. In 2006, Diam's music video for La Boulette was released exclusively on Booska-P; the influx of visitors temporarily crashed the site. Booska-P was subsequently the first media outlet to feature the group Sexion d'Assaut, thus contributing to their success.

In 2012, Booska-P released a compilation album of tracks by young French and Belgian rappers to showcase new talent.

In 2016, the team of seven employees left their original offices in Courcouronnes and moved to a larger space in Montrouge. The three founders were still part of the team: Fif the manager, Amadou the editor-in-chief, and Alexis the webmaster.

In February 2025, the media's YouTube channel was deleted due to hacking.

== Acquisition ==
In 2023, Booska-P encountered financial difficulties, largely due to the post-Covid fallout. The media outlet launched a fundraising round, but in 2024, it entered into a state of cessation of payments followed by judicial liquidation.

In 2024, Booska-P was acquired by a consortium of 17 investors to develop new activities such as white-label production, while maintaining its editorial independence. Its co-founder Amadou Ba remained at the head of the company, which had reached a revenue of €2.6 million in 2022.

The main shareholders of the consortium are: Paul Lê, Wale Gbadamosi Oyekanmi, So Press, Sacha Ben Harroche, Laurent Ritter (Voodoo), Adrien Miniatti (Luni), Antony Rode and Pingki Houang (Les Sabliers), Anice Chaglou (Letus), Fariha Shah (Cominty), Reda Berrehili (Klub), Mathias Mouats and Steve Belkaçemi (Asap Work), Baptiste Corval (Phenix), Idir Ait Si Amer (Tracktor), Ahmed Ottman, and Mehdi Benhibi (flashAd).

== Audience and Revenue ==
The site holds a near-monopoly on covering French rap news on the Internet. It claimed over a million unique monthly visitors in 2013 and 3.5 million in 2016. The site's revenue comes primarily from advertising and the sale of clothing, which allowed it to achieve a revenue of €300,000 (with a team of nine people) in 2012. In 2022, its revenue reached €2.6 million.
