= Guillaume Grand =

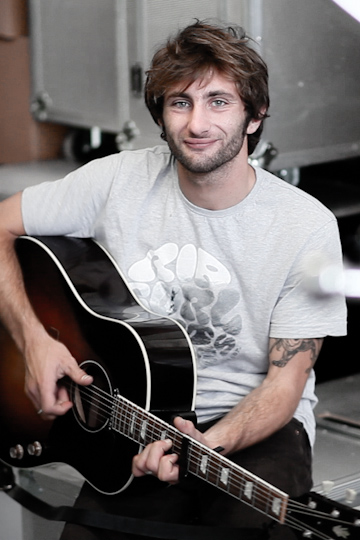

Background information
- Born: Guillaume Grand; 25 August 1983 (age 42); Bergerac, Dordogne, France
- Genres: Pop, folk
- Occupations: Singer, composer
- Instrument: Guitar
- Years active: 2010-present
- Label: EMI

Guillaume Grand, born in 1983 in Bergerac, is a French singer and composer. He is best known for his song "Toi et Moi" ("You and Me") from his debut album L'amour est laid.

== Discography ==
=== Albums ===
Year	Album	Peak positions			Certifications
Year	Album	BEL Wa	FRA	SUI	Certifications
2010	L'amour est laid	45	29	–	

=== Singles ===
Year	Single	Peak positions			Certifications	Single
Year	Single	BEL Wa	FRA	SUI	Certifications	Single
2010	"Toi et moi"	4	15	60		L'amour est laid
2010	"L'amour est laid"	–	–	–		L'amour est laid
2011	"Couvre ta peau"	–	–	–		L'amour est laid
