= L'Écrasement de tête =

Mixtape by Sexion d'Assaut
- Released: 4 March 2009
- Genres: French rap, pop, house
- Length: 78:58
- Label: Wati B

Sexion d'Assaut chronology
Les Chroniques du 75 (2009)	L'Écrasement de tête (2009)	L'École des points vitaux (2010)

Singles from L'Écrasement de tête
- 1. "À 30%" Released: 2 December 2008; 2. "T’es bête ou quoi ?" Released: 12 March 2009; 3. "Wati bon son" Released: 11 April 2009; 4. "Routine" Released: 20 June 2009

L'Écrasement de tête (Head Crush) is the first street album by the Sexion d'Assaut collective (not taking into account the discography of the 3rd Prototype, the internal group of the Sexion d'Assaut). La Sexion d'Assaut was made up of the 3rd Prototype group and solo artists: Black M, Doomams, Balistik and L.I.O (Balistik and L.I.O, however, did not make the slightest appearance on the street album). Lefa said in a magazine in 2009 that the 3rd Prototype did not exist since the release of The Head Crush, therefore the Sexion D'Assaut is a band in its own right and no longer a collective. It was released on May 4, 2009 on Because Music. This disc will be the first to experience significant success, and really increase the group's notoriety among the general public. The title "T'es bête ou quoi ?" appears on the soundtrack of the film Ong-Bak 2. The album has sold over 45,000 copies. This street album allows them to start their first tour with many dates all over France in full venues, to their surprise.

On this street album, we find exclusively the members of Sexion Assault or Wati B, namely Maître Gims, Lefa, Barack Adama, Black M, JR O Crom, Doomams, and Dry, with the exception of Ania who Doesn't belong to Sexion Assault or Wati B. Finally, Wati B founder Dawala makes an appearance on the album's intro and on the start of the "Wati Bon Son" music video.

== Track listing ==
No.	Title	Writer(s)	Length
1.	"Intro"	Dawala	1:28
2.	"T'es bête ou quoi ?"	Gims, Lefa, Barack Adama, Maska, Black M	4:06
3.	"La Douille"	Gims, Barack Adama, Maska	3:51
4.	"À 30 %"	Gims	5:20
5.	"Ça vient de Paname"	Barack Adama, Lefa, Gims, Doomams, JR O Crom	3:45
6.	"Routine"	Gims, Lefa, Maska, Barack Adama, Black M	5:35
7.	"Propagande"	JR O Crom, Gims, Barack Adama, Maska, Lefa	4:57
8.	"L'Œil de verre"	Gims, Lefa, Maska	5:14
9.	"Tu t'es ficha"	Gims, Lefa, Black M	3:29
10.	"Interlude"	Adams Diallo	2:08
11.	"Choqué"	Barack Adama, Gims, JR O Crom, Black M	4:53
12.	"Cessez le feu" (featuring Ania)	Lefa, Barack Adama, Maska, JR O Crom, Ania	4:36
13.	"À la mode de chez nous"	Gims, JR O Crom	4:08
14.	"Il est length qu'on go"	Lefa, Barack Adama, Black M	4:40
15.	"Ça se ressent dans l'écriture"	Barack Adama, Lefa, Black M	4:07
16.	"Cascadé"	Lefa, Gims, JR O Crom	5:48
17.	"Wati bon son" (featuring Dry)	Black M, Dry, Gims, Lefa, JR O Chrome, Doomams, Maska, Barack Adama	4:05
18.	"Non coupable"	Lefa	6:40

== Charts ==
Chart (2010)	Peak position
French Albums (SNEP)	36
