= Dingue, dingue, dingue =

2010 single by Christophe Maé

Single by Christophe Maé

from the album On trace la route
- B-side: "Donald dans les docks"
- Released: 25 January 2010
- Recorded: 2009
- Genre: Pop
- Length: 3:04
- Label: Warner Music
- Songwriter: Lionel Florence

Christophe Maé singles chronology
"Mon p'tit gars" (2008)	"Dingue, dingue, dingue" (2010)	"J'ai laissé" (2010)

"Dingue, dingue, dingue" is a 2009 song recorded by French singer Christophe Maé. It was the lead single from his third studio album On trace la route, and his eighth single overall. An official statement from his label Warner Music announced the single would be released to radio stations on 27 November 2009 after a CD promo was sent. It was later released digitally on 7 December and physically on 25 January 2010. It achieved success in France, being Maé's second number one hit single after "On s'attache" in 2007.

== Music and video ==
Le Parisien stated the song is "rhythmic and effective". According to Maé, "it is music that comes from the heart, rather spontaneous in the composing."

The music video illustrates the difficulty of reconciling love and friendship. It shows Maé declaring his love to his girlfriend who does not like his friends, with whom he lived, however. To try to keep her, he tries to do all what he can. In fact, he delights in this situation because all this finally allows him to spend more time with his friends. Maé said "it is tongue-in-cheek of course". The song was performed on television for the first time in the NRJ Music Awards show.

== Chart performances ==
"Dingue, dingue, dingue" achieved success on the French Singles Chart. It entered directly at number one on 30 January 2010 selling 10,970 units, and stayed for a total of three weeks atop. In Belgium (Wallonia), the single debuted at number 22 on 19 December 2009 with downloads only and reached a peak of number four in the sixteenth week on the Ultratop 50. In Switzerland, the single had a moderate success, reaching number 30.

In France, the song sold 43,384 units and 94,515 downloads in 2010.

== Track listings ==
CD single / Digital download

No.	Title	Length
1.	"Dingue, dingue, dingue"
2.	"Donald dans les docks"

CD single - Promo

No.	Title	Length
1.	"Dingue, dingue, dingue"	3:04

== Charts ==
=== Peak positions ===
Chart (2010)	Peak position
Belgian (Wallonia) Airplay Chart	1
Belgian (Wallonia) Singles Chart	4
Eurochart Hot 100	6
French SNEP Singles Chart	1
French SNEP Digital Chart	3
Swiss Singles Chart	30

=== Year-end charts ===
Chart (2010)	Position
Belgian (Wallonia) Singles Chart	24
European Hot 100	39
French SNEP Singles Chart	5

== See also ==
- List of number-one hits of 2010 (France)
