= L'École des points vitaux =

Studio album by Sexion d'Assaut
- Released: 29 March 2010
- Recorded: 2009–2010
- Genre: French rap, pop, house
- Length: 74:15
- Label: Wati B

Sexion d'Assaut chronology
| L'Écrasement de tête (2009) | L'École des points vitaux (2010) | En attendant L'Apogée: les Chroniques du 75 (2011) |

Singles from L'École des points vitaux
- 1. "L'École des points vitaux" Released: 19 December 2009; 2. "Casquette à l'envers" Released: 2 February 2010; 3. "Changement d'ambiance" Released: 17 March 2010; 4. "Désolé" Released: 12 April 2010; 5. "Wati by Night" Released: 4 August 2010; 6. "J'ai pas les loves" Released: 19 October 2010

L'École des points vitaux (The school of vital points) is the second official album by French rap group Sexion d'Assaut composed of Maître Gims, Lefa, Barack Adama, Maska, JR O Crom, Black M, Doomams, and L.I.O. Petrodollars (which only appears once in the album). This album was released on March 29, 2010 in stores and available for download.

In November 2010, the album was certified triple platinum in France. It has sold nearly 400,000 copies. It is Maître Gims who signs most of the instrumentals on this CD.

== Track listing ==
| No. | Title | Writer(s) | Producer(s) | Length |
|---|---|---|---|---|
| 1. | "Intro (en résumé)" | Maska; Jr O Crom; Lefa; Doomams; Barack Adama; Maître Gims; Black M | Gilbert Baluga | 7:11 |
| 2. | "Casquette à l'envers" | Lefa; Black M; Maître Gims; Jr O Crom | Wati B | 4:44 |
| 3. | "Mon gars sûr" | Maître Gims; Jr O Crom; Black M; Lefa; Barack Adama | Wisla; Wati B | 4:41 |
| 4. | "L'école des points vitaux" | Black M; Jr O Crom; Maître Gims; Lefa; Doomams; Maska; Barack Adama | Tosma; Wati B | 3:51 |
| 5. | "Ils appellent ça" | Maître Gims; Doomams; Maska; Barack Adama; Black M | Wisla; Wati B | 5:01 |
| 6. | "Itinéraire d'un chômeur" | Lefa; Black M; Jr O Crom | Wisla; Wati B | 4:18 |
| 7. | "La drogue te donne des ailes" | Maître Gims; Maska; Black M | Soulchildren; Wati B | 5:04 |
| 8. | "Tu l'as fait pour elle" (feat. Klem) | Klem; Maître Gims; Lefa; Barack Adama; Black M | Wisla; Renaud Rebillaud; Wati B | 4:07 |
| 9. | "Paname lève toi" | Maître Gims; Lefa; Doomams; L.I.O; Jr O Crom | Wisla; Wati B | 4:13 |
| 10. | "Tel père tel fils" | Barack Adama; Black M; Lefa | Fleau; Wati B; David Krief | 4:34 |
| 11. | "Rien n't'appartient" (feat. Klem) | Barack Adama; Maître Gims; Maska; Klem | Wisla; Wati B | 5:25 |
| 12. | "Changement d'ambiance" | Maître Gims; Barack Adama; Lefa; Jr O Crom | Wisla; Wati B | 5:01 |
| 13. | "J'ai pas les loves" | Doomams; Maître Gims; Barack Adama; Lefa; Black M | Wisla; Wati B | 5:37 |
| 14. | "Ça chuchote" | Maître Gims; Jr O Crom; Barack Adama; Lefa; Black M | Wisla; Wati B | 3:42 |
| 15. | "Wati by night" (feat. Dry) | Black M; Dry; Maître Gims; Lefa | Wisla; Wati B; Renaud Rebillaud; Dry | 4:09 |
| 16. | "Désolé" | Maître Gims; Barack Adama; Lefa; Black M | Wisla; Wati B; Renaud Rebillaud | 3:24 |
| Total length: | | | | 74:15 |

== Charts ==
=== Weekly charts ===
| Chart (2010) | Peak position |
|---|---|
| Belgian Albums (Ultratop Wallonia) | 5 |
| French Albums (SNEP) | 2 |
| Swiss Albums (Schweizer Hitparade) | 37 |

=== Year-end charts ===
| Chart (2010) | Position |
|---|---|
| Belgian Albums (Ultratop Wallonia) | 31 |
| French Albums (SNEP) | 10 |

| Chart (2011) | Position |
|---|---|
| French Albums (SNEP) | 134 |
