= En attendant L'Apogée: les Chroniques du 75 =

Les Chroniques du 75, Vol. 2

Compilation album by Sexion d'Assaut
- Released: 4 April 2011
- Genre: French rap, pop, house
- Label: Wati B

Sexion d'Assaut chronology
L'École des points vitaux (2010)	Les Chroniques du 75, Vol. 2 (2011)	L'Apogée (2012)

Singles from Les Chroniques du 75 Vol. 2
- 1. "Paris va bien" Released: 12 February 2011; 2. "Qui t'a dit ?" Released: 11 March 2011; 3. "Plus qu'un son" Released: 28 March 2011; 4. "À bout d'souffle" Released: 11 April 2011

En attendant L'Apogée: les Chroniques du 75 or Les Chroniques du 75 Vol. 2 is a DVD-mixtape by the group Sexion d'Assaut, released on 4 April 2011 and produced by the Wati B label.

== History ==
On 23 September 2010, the Sexion d'Assaut announced the En attendant L'Apogée: les Chroniques du 75 by means of a video. The concept is based on that of the Les Chroniques du 75 released on 5 January 2009, with the difference that this work is not released as a net-tape but on DVD, after the commercial success of the album L'École des points vitaux. Six tracks were released for free as well as five music videos.

The DVD was released on 4 April 2011, along with a CD containing the audio tracks. As in the first volume, there is a solo from each member of the group, as well as alliances between different members so that the audience can discover more deeply the personality of each member of the Sexion d'Assaut.

On 12 February, the first single was released: "Paris va bien". It is not available as a free download but can be downloaded from iTunes. On 12 March, the 1st clip is released on YouTube "Qui t'a dit?" Which was not released in audio form but directly declined as a clip. This track takes the air of "Here Comes the Hotstepper" by Ini Kamoze.

The eight members of the group appear in the mixtape, however Dry who was featured on the two previous projects does not participate. The project ranks 3rd in the album sales rankings in France with more than 16,000 copies sold in one week. Then 7th after 2 weeks with more than 25,000 copies sold.

=== Documentary ===
The DVD also contains a documentary retracing the lives of the members of the group, their journey... In the L'Apogée part, we hear and see the group working on a project for their next album which will become "Mets pas celle là".

== Track listing ==
No.	Title	Writer(s)	Producer(s)	Length
1.	"Paris va bien"	Maître Gims; Lefa; Barack Adama; Black Mesrimes	Wati B; Stan-E; Akad	3:57
2.	"Qui t'a dit ?"	Maître Gims; Lefa; Black Mesrimes	Wati B; Wisla	4:27
3.	"B.S.S."	Lefa; Jr O Crom	Wati B; Stan-E; Akad	3:14
4.	"Breh"	Barack Adama; Jr O Crom; Maître Gims; Doomams; Black Mesrimes; Maska; Lefa	Wati B; Stan-E; Akad	4:21
5.	"Traqué"	Maska	Sinima	3:30
6.	"Vu la haine que j'ai"	Lefa; Black Mesrimes	Wati B; Stan-E; Akad	4:35
7.	"Ra-Fall"	Lefa	Wati B; Stan-E; Akad	4:06
8.	"Le relais"	Lefa; Black Mesrimes; Barack Adama; Jr O Crom; Maska; Doomams; Maître Gims	Wati B; Matkill	5:14
9.	"A.D."	Barack Adama	The Unbeatables	4:31
10.	"À bout d'souffle"	Maître Gims; Maska; Lefa; Jr O Crom	Wati B	3:36
11.	"Pas d'chance"	Black Mesrimes; Barack Adama; Lefa	Shiny; Wati B	2:59
12.	"Black Shady Part.2"	Black Mesrimes	Wati B; Stan-E; Akad	3:36
13.	"O'brothers"	Lefa; Doomams; Jr O Crom	Fleomatique	3:22
14.	"Flow d'killer"	Jr O Crom	Ali	2:33
15.	"Cramponnez-vous"	Black Mesrimes; Maître Gims	Wati B; Matkill	3:30
16.	"Mamadou"	Doomams	Fenix	3:47
17.	"Instinct de survie"	Maska; Lefa; Jr O Crom; Doomams	Allrounda	3:54
18.	"Boy's in the hood"	Jr O Crom; Doomams	Wati B; Stan-E; Akad	3:35
19.	"Noir"	Maître Gims	Wati B; Stan-E; Akad	5:19
20.	"Plus qu'un son"	Maska; Lefa; Doomams; Barack Adama	Wati B; Matkill	4:01

== Charts ==
Chart (2011)	Peak position
Belgian Albums (Ultratop Wallonia)	10
French Albums (SNEP)	3
Swiss Albums (Schweizer Hitparade)	46
