= Sexion d'Assaut =

French hip hop band

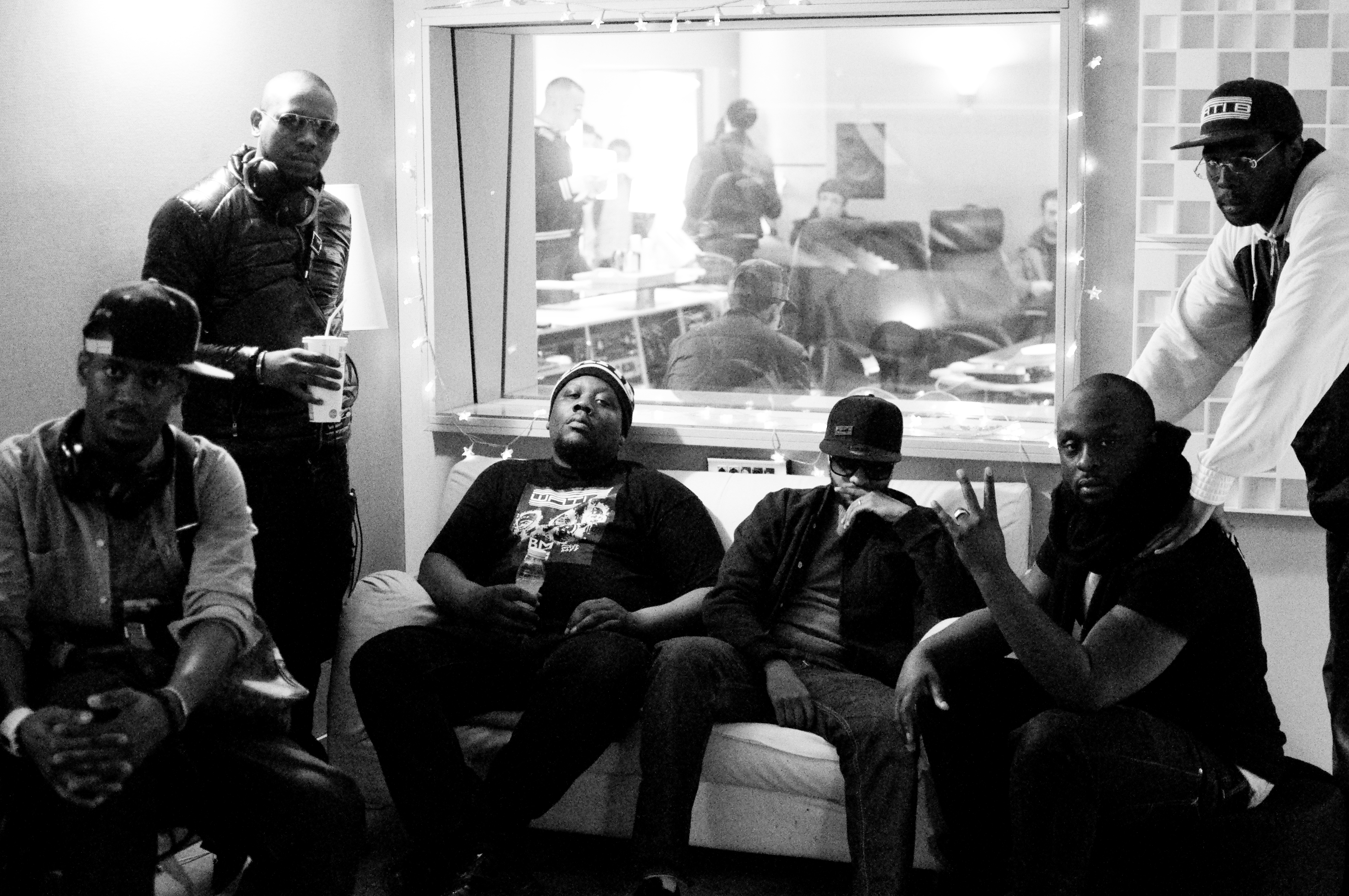
- La Sexion d'Assaut in 2012 with, from left to right: Black M, Doomams, JR O Crom, Lefa, Barack Adama and L.I.O Pétrodollars. (Maska is also visible in the background)

Background information
- Origin: Paris, France
- Genre: French hip-hop
- Years active: 2002–2013, 2016, 2020–2022
- Labels: Wati B (2005–2021); Play Two (2021–2022)
- Past members: Maître Gims (Leader); Lefa; Doomams; Black M Barack Adama; Maska; JR O Crom; L.I.O. Pétrodollars
- Website: www.sexiondassaut.com

Sexion d'Assaut (French pronunciation: [sɛksjɔ̃ daso]), formerly known as 3ème Prototype (for "Troisième Prototype" [tʁwɑzjɛm pʁɔtɔtip]), was a French hip hop band formed in 2002, composed of eight Parisian rappers. They are signed to independent record label Wati B, which is under exclusive license to Sony Music Entertainment France.

The founding members were L.I.O. Black M, Maska and Lefa. In 2003, it became a collective as Maître Gims and JR O Crom joined in. Throughout its existence, it included about 20 rappers, but set-up changed from time to time. The group distinguishes itself of staying away from "bling bling" that other French rappers have adopted. They also retain the style of old school hip-hop, but keep underground influences and spent almost a decade fostering an underground fanbase before releasing their debut studio album L'École des points vitaux in 2010.

Their album L'École des points vitaux in 2010 went quadruple platinum. The album En attendant L'Apogée: les Chroniques du 75 in 2011 and L'Apogée in 2012 both went platinum and diamond respectively.

The group planned to reform in 2020 with a third album, Le Retour des Rois, and a national tour planned for 2021, but the album was cancelled despite the tour taking place.

== Career ==
=== Debut (2002–2004) ===
The Sexion d'Assaut group was formed in 2002 as a collective. It initially had around thirty members from Paris and its suburbs, then only those most attached to Sexion d'Assaut remained there. The collective is first formed around the group Assonance (L.I.O, Barack Adama, Lefa, Maska and Scrib'R), Prototype 3015 (Gims, JR O Crom and K.A.N.M.S) as well as other groups. Shortly after, solo artists Black M and Doomams joined the collective. The internal group 75 Neces'R, composed of Scrib'R, Akeur and Rod'R, released in cassette format the collective's first official project in 2002: an eponymous mixtape, with underground rappers like the group FMR or the rapper H Magnum.

In 2005, the names of the Assonance and Prototype 3015 groups disappeared in favor of the 3rd Prototype. This group included Barack Adama, Lefa, Maska, Gims and JR O Crom. There were also solo artists Black M, Doomams, R-Mak, Balistik, Anraye and L.I.O. (who was abroad at the time), with Jiba Jiba (Amos), Baby Joe (Jonathan Seri) and Dim'One (Khadim Lo) as managers. The first scenes of the group take place on the occasion of Fête de la Musique or town hall celebrations. It was during the time of Gang Yaba Gang. The young group teamed up to rent hours at the studio, have t-shirts made and, little by little, establish themselves on the Parisian scene.

=== The first projects (2005–2008) ===
The group's meeting with Dawala, founder of the Wati B label, takes place shortly after in Châtelet-Les Halles, organized by H Magnum. It was in 2006 that the first project of a member of the collective came out. This is Black M with its title Le Pacte, a maxi produced in tacit complicity with a close friend, Bakry. This maxi contains eight tracks, the introduction of which, Le Coup finale, features Barack Adama, Gims and Anraye. If the collaborations with Dry are numerous, Demon One is quite distant from the group, with only one participation in the song Interdit en radio, in trio with Dry and Barack Adama, on the compilation Interdit en radio Vol.2. On 13 May 2006, the first mixtape of the internal group 3e Prototype, La Terre du milieu, was released under the Wati B label. Doomams participates in the track Freestyle - the same for Black M, which appears twice. R-Mak provides an interlude. Note also an appearance of Anraye.

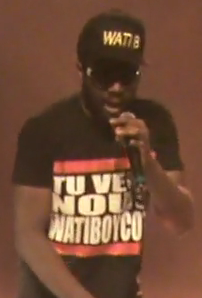
Gims the lead vocalist of the group, in concert with Sexion d'Assaut at Cléon on 22 February 2010.

Balistik, the “phantom” member of the collective, appears once on the title "Ça va ça vient". The song On t'a humilié contributes to the controversy surrounding the group concerning homophobia in September 2010. L.I.O., who went to study in the United States, did not return to the group until 2010 under the name L.I.O. Petrodollars. On 7 December 2006, it was the turn of Gims to go solo, with an Ep entitled Ceux qui dorment les yeux ouverts, in which Koma from the Scred Connexion participate, on the song of the same name, as well as a collaboration with the full group on the track Permanent "Tsunami permanent". In June 2007, the group released their first music video, "Histoire pire que vraie", followed a few months later by "Anti-tecktonik".

The first street album of the 3rd Prototype, entitled Le Renouveau, was released on 4 April 2008 under the Wati B label, in which we find the two previously clipped tracks, as well as featurings with Doomams on the title "Fils de lâche", Dry on Normal, Kizito on Survivor and R-Mak on "Gotham City", without forgetting, as usual, a good number of feats with Black M. Shortly after, R-Mak left the collective to devote himself to a solo career.

Directly after the release of the street album, the team worked on Les Chroniques du mois, their new songs as well as a freestyle were published every month between July and December 2008. During the month of December, the group released three street clips: "À 30 %", "Où sont les kickeurs?" and "Ah ouais paraît qu'j'suis doué", the third of which contains the clip for the song Even not the SMIC. On 9 January 2009, Les Chroniques du 75 is published on the Internet, a net-tape which brings together the sounds of the Chroniques du mois, a few tracks from the street album Le Renouveau and the mix-tape La terre du milieu and a few unreleased tracks. The goal of this net-tape was to expand their audience, around 3,000 people at the time according to them, and to promote the next street album.

=== L'École des points vitaux (2009–2010) ===
The group released their first street album L'Écrasement de tête on 4 May 2009. They gained notoriety with the general public thanks to two clips: "T'es bête ou quoi?" and "Wati bon son" in collaboration with Dry. In order to promote the film Ong bak 2: Birth of the Dragon, the title "T'es bête ou quoi?" is used for the soundtrack of the film, featuring images from the film. Lefa announces in the Rap Mag of March 2010 the dissolution of the group 3e Prototype since the release of this street album. Consequently, Sexion d'Assaut is no longer a collective, but a group in its own right. This street album allows them to begin their first tour with many dates throughout France, where it is expected in full venues, to their surprise.

The group's debut album, L'École des points vitaux, was released on 29 March 2010, by Sony Music. It is the one in which L.I.O. Pétrodollars participates, on the song "Paname lève-toi". The album was a huge success, and sold over 19,000 copies in the first week. Titles like "Casquette à l'envers", "L'École des points vitaux" or "Mon gars sûr". The title "Casquette à l'envers" was not released because of Nadine Morano's statements, but it could have, as the group confided to Mustapha El Atrassi during a television interview: “We could have made this song after the recent statements by Nadine Morano. The Secretary of State had affirmed: "Me what I want from a young person, when he is French, it is (...) that he does not speak verlan, that he does not put his cap upside down. . It’s a way of saying that clothes don’t make a monk. ”15 The album was certified gold three weeks after its release. The title of the album L'École des points vitaux is a nod to the manga Fist of the North Star (Ken the Survivor in France). We can notice on the last page of the cover of L'École des points vitaux that Lefa writes on a blank sheet: “Next album: L'APO”. This would indicate a semblance of a title or an acronym for a new album: L'Apogée. The album L'École des points vitaux has a total of more than 400,000 copies sold, and is certified triple platinum.

The titles "Casquette à l'envers", "J'ai pas les loves", "Wati by Night" and the hit "Désolé" are a huge success with the general public. Change of atmosphere is part of the soundtrack of the film The A-Team. These pieces are put in the form of clips throughout 2010. Sexion d'Assaut begins a new tour throughout France, notably in the first part of the most famous rap duo in France, Suprême NTM, the 19 June 2010 at the Parc des Princes. On 6 June in Bercy, they were to open for American rapper Jay-Z, but due to a lack of consideration from their American counterparts, they decided not to open for the concert. They are also the subject of many parodies or other jokes, as in the after-sales service of Omar and Fred's broadcasts on Canal +, Willaxxx, or even in a clip by Kevin Razy and the other members of Sexion d'Homos. They are among the first French artists to exceed one million fans (with Daft Punk and David Guetta) on the Facebook community site, in August 2010.

=== L'Apogée (2011–2012) ===
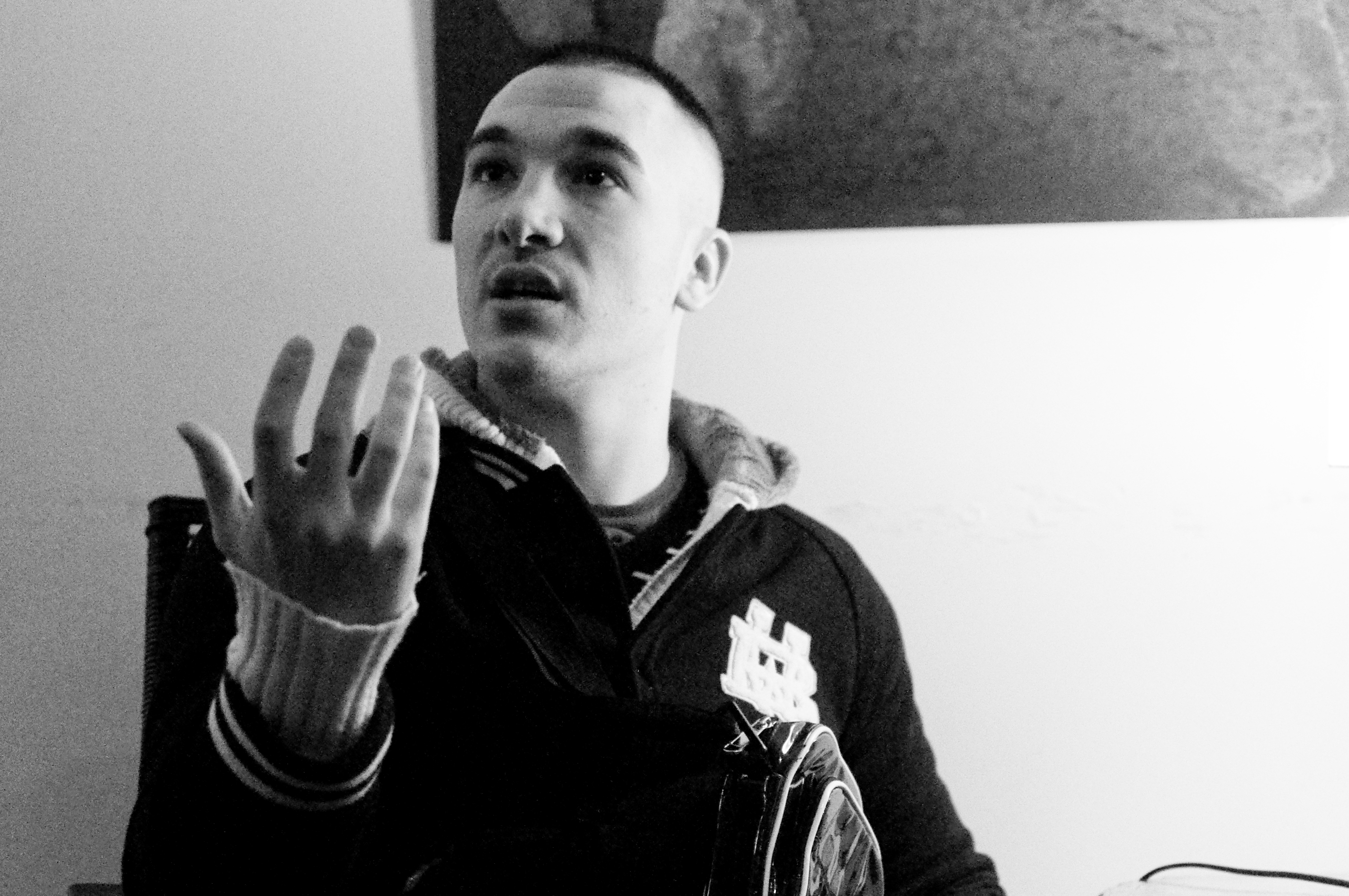
Maska member of the groupe here in 2012.

On 4 April 2011, the group released a mixtape called En attendant L'Apogée: les Chroniques du 75. The CD / DVD sells over 150,000 copies. All of the project's tracks have a clip on the DVD, accompanied by an exclusive documentary on the group's journey. On 18 November 2011, Sexion d'Assaut uploaded a freestyle entitled "Welcome to the Wa". In this new video, they announce that the first clip of L'Apogée will be called "Mets pas celle-là", which will be released on 11 December 2011 on the official Facebook of Sexion d'Assaut. In this video, Barack Adama and Gims also confirm that the album is completely finished. The album was officially released on 5 March 2012. On 20 December 2011, "Welcome to the Wa Part II" was released, and at the end of the freestyle, Black M announced that the next single from L'Apogée would be called "Disque d'or", on the group's official Facebook, Friday, 30 December. On Thursday 5 January, live on Skyrock, Sexion d'Assaut exclusively delivers the third extract from L'Apogée. During Planète Rap, the group shares their new single Before she leaves, saying that it is a music different from the others because it is sentimental. This song is probably a tribute to JR O Crom's mother who, according to the lyrics, left too soon.

L'Apogée was published on 5 March 2012. On the very day of the release, 10,000 copies sold. The album is certified gold the first week after having sold 66,000 copies. Two weeks after the release, the album is certified platinum disc. About two months after its release the album was declared a double platinum disc. On 22 May 2012, they filled the Salle de Bercy for the first time. The CD / DVD of this concert is due out on 19 November 2012. The second Bercy de Sexion d'Assaut took place on 15 October 2012. At the end of the concert, Maska announces that the reissue of L'Apogée will be available in stores at from January 2013. On 22 October 2012, the album L'Apogée was certified diamond disc with more than 539,000 copies sold. The album was reissued on 19 November at the same time as the DVD of the Bercy concert.

=== Consecration (2013–2019) ===
After the immense success of L'Apogée, Sexion d'Assaut won two NRJ Music Awards on 26 January 2013 in the categories of “Francophone group / duo of the year” and “Francophone song of the year” for "Avant qu'elle parte". Two days later, the video Welcome to the WA Part was released. 4 with a documentary retracing the NRJ Music Awards of Sexion d'Assaut. In early 2013, rumors circulated about a possible separation of Sexion d'Assaut. To these rumors, Black M replies: "But who told you 'the Sexion is separating'? Gims will be released on 20 May Subliminal, me end of the year! Lefa musical break (personal life) JR O Crome and Doomams are preparing surprises for you, Maska too, still under the label Wati B, according to rumors!" On 31 January 2013, the specialized website Booska-P produced a documentary entitled Wati Ceremony, on Sexion d'Assaut's triumph at the NRJ Music Awards.

In the video, Gims announces in C'Cauet that his solo album Subliminal will be released on 20 May 2013 and that this album will be followed by Black M's solo album scheduled for late 2013, that of Maska scheduled for 2014, a project between Doomams and JR O Crom planned for the course of 2014. In March 2013, JR O Chrome and Doomams participate in the soundtrack of the film La Cité rose, with the title If I had known, in collaboration with Jmi Sissoko and Exta; also released a book which traces the life of Gims and a comic strip.

On 28 September 2013, the group met at the Stade de France for the Urban Peace 3 concert which also brought together IAM, Orelsan, Youssoupha, La Fouine, Psy 4 de la Rime and Stromae. Gims also performed solo on this occasion. In December 2013, Gims was once again nominated for the NRJ Music Awards, but this time solo, in the “best male artist” category. However, it is Stromae who wins this trophy.

=== Canceled album Le Retour des Rois (2020–2022) ===
After one or more solo albums, the group would like to come back with a new album, entitled Le Retour des Rois. However, due to different agendas for each member of the group, the production of the album is constantly postponed. The members of the group did not go their separate ways. When a member of the group leaves a solo project, all the members of Sexion d'Assaut help him in his project. In addition, in various interviews the members say they are ready and motivated for the project. While Gims wishes to conquer the American market with his third album Ceinture noire released on 23 March 2018, Black M is on tour throughout France and releases the reissue of his album Éternel insatisfait, on 17 November 2017, Barack Adama is working on his first Extended play Libertad on 21 February 2017, Lefa released his second album Visionnaire on 22 September 2017, Maska his new mixtape Akhal-Teké on 13 October 2017 and LIO Pétrodollars a return to his first Extended play Outre monde on 19 October 2017. JR O Crom and Doomams are also working on their respective solo projects. It is therefore currently becoming complicated to bring together all the members in the same studio.

The return to the studio of the members of the group was to take place in March 2017 as announced by Dawala, the boss of the Wati B label. However, in February 2017, due to a copyright issue, Gims decided to leave the Wati B Label, which at the same time clouded the possibility of a return of the group, being himself signed with Wati B its collaborations of the third album of the Sexion d'Assaut. No information on the group filtered until an interview with Black M granted to Mouv '(August 2017), during which he revealed the following information: "We are going to go on tour again, surely the Zéniths of all France as d 'habit ". It is then the turn of Gims, during an interview for the concert of tolerance in Agadir in October 2017, to reveal more information on the return of the group: “My third album is called Ceinture noire, it will be released. next year. And the return of Sexion d'Assaut will be just after my next album ”,“ We talk about it a lot between us. After that, we do not communicate on it yet, because there are a lot of schedules which are quite complicated to articulate together. Once we are really ready and we know where we are going, it will be fine. We don't have a date. But if there is a comeback, we won't wait until 2020".

On 30 December 2019, during Planète Rap by 4Keus, a group signed by Wati B, Dawala confirms Le Retour des Rois for the end of 2020. On 27 March 2020, during a live Instagram with Dadju, Gims replied that he confirmed a new album Le Retour des Rois for this year. "Here we are in the negotiations, of who, or, the album will be released, with whom it will be distributed. You know, the technical stuff." On 29 March 2020, the first album of the Sexion d'Assaut: L'École des points vitaux celebrates its 10th anniversary. On 31 March 2020, Sexion d'Assaut opens an official Instagram account with the bio Le Retour des Rois. On 30 March 2020 in this recording, Gims listens to several songs from the Sexion d'Assaut album Le Retour des Rois while driving in his car.

On 2 May 2020, during a live Instagram comeback with Sniper, Sefyu and Gradur. Gims has formalized his 100% rap album for the start of the 2020 school year at the latest, and Le Retour des Rois for the end of 2020, or even the beginning of 2021. After the end of the first confinement on 11 May 2020, Gims announces the return of the Sexion d'Assaut with the new album Le Retour des Rois, then scheduled for the fall, in the absence in L.I.O. Petrodollars, the latter having indeed stopped music to devote himself to catering in Paris. The Sexion d'Assaut will make its comeback in concert at Paris La Défense Arena on 25 September 2021, a date officially set for January but postponed due to the raging health crisis. On Instagram, Black M records the first single from the album.

On 6 December 2021, more than a year after the announcement of the tour, the band revealed that their album Le Retour des Rois will be released on 14 May 2022, exclusively in physical form, on sale in the concert halls of the tour. On 23 December 2021, Gims teases an appearance by SCH in the album. On 7 October 2022, Gims announces that Le Retour des Rois will not take place due to the disagreement of the Parisian group.

== Members ==
=== Present members ===
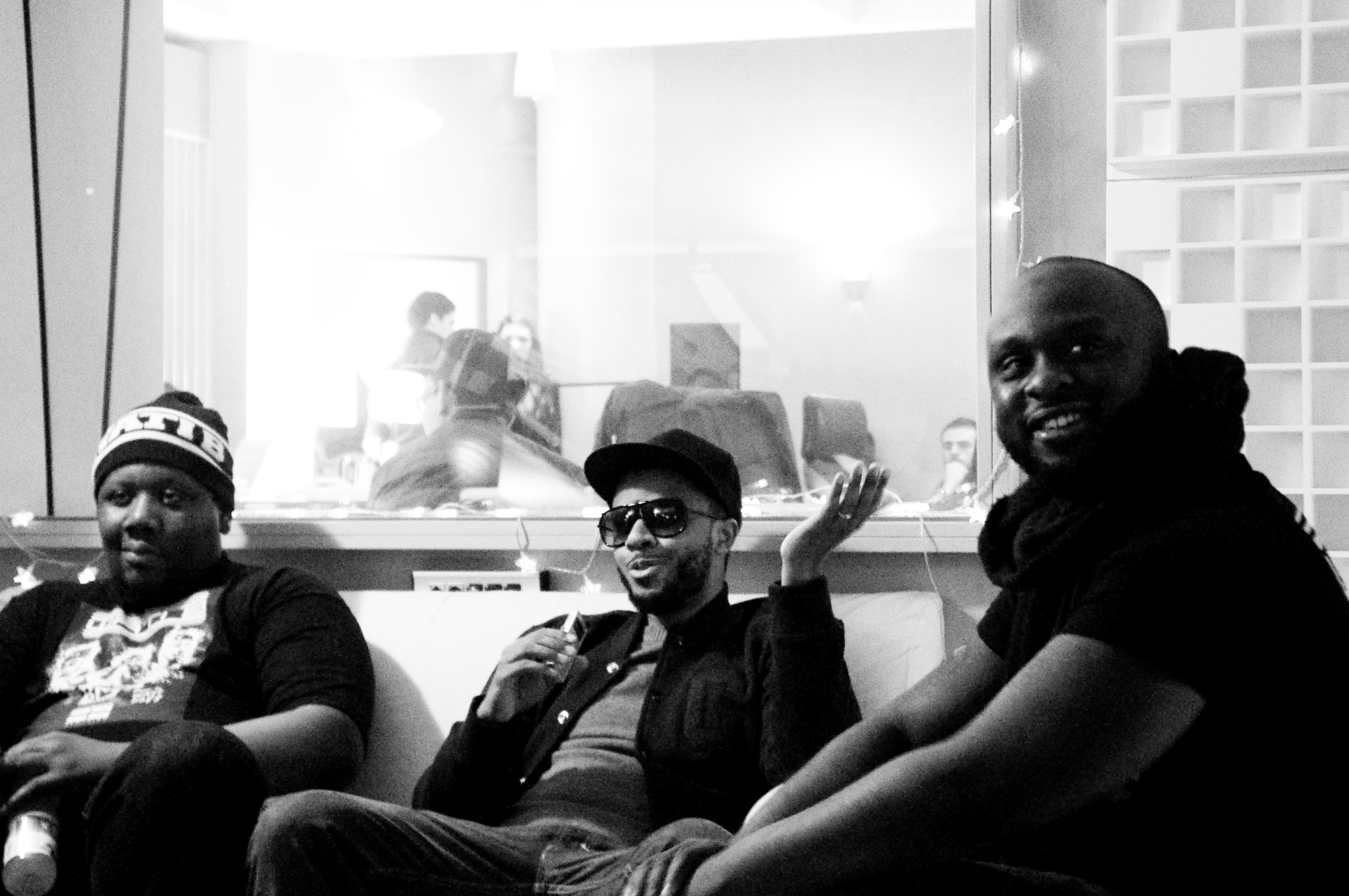
Members of Sexion d'Assaut: JR O Crom, Lefa and Barack Adama.

- Barack Adama, real name Adams Diallo (no relation to Black M), originally from Senegal descent. He grew up in the Rochechouart neighborhood, in the 9th arrondissement.
- Black M, real name Alpha Diallo, of Guinean descent. He grew up on the Rue du Bac (7th arrondissement) and later in the 13th arrondissement.
- Doomams, real name Mamadou Baldé, of Guinean origin. He grew up in Val-de-Marne and later in the 18th arrondissement. He is frequently seen wearing Ray-Bann sunglasses.
- Gims, real name Gandhi Bilel Djuna, originally from the Democratic Republic of the Congo and grew up in the Arts-et-Métiers neighborhood in the 3rd arrondissement. He moved later on to the 9th arrondissement. He is usually with sunglasses.
- JR O Crom, real name Karim Ballo, of Malian origin. He grew up in Arts-et-Métiers, in the 3rd arrondissement.
- Lefa, real name Karim Fall, of Senegalese descent. He grew up in the Abbesses neighborhood in the 18th arrondissement of Paris.
- Maska, real name Bastien Vincent, from the 9th arrondissement. He is noted as the only white member of the group.

== Controversies ==
=== Homophobia ===
In June 2010, during an interview for the magazine International Hip-Hop, group member Lefa said, “For a while, we attacked homosexuals a lot because we are one hundred percent homophobic and we accept that. [...] For us, the fact of being homosexual is a deviance which is not tolerable" as well as saying "homosexuality is far from our practices. We don't understand it. We come from an environment where there is none.” Controversial language referring to homosexuality is also found in the group's lyrics: the song "On t'a humilié" contains the lyrics "I think it is high time that queers perish, cut off their penises, leave the dead on the outskirts of town," while Maska's lyrics in "Cessez le feu" read "Gone are the days when homo[sexuals] hooked up in private, now they kiss in public in their rainbow clothes [...] All these practices are not healthy."

Following these statements, Fun Radio and NRJ banned Sexion d'Assaut from aerial and calls for concert cancellations were made. The group then released a statement saying that "Sexion d'Assaut would like to apologize to those who have been hurt or shocked." The SOS Homophobie association demanded that Sexion d'Assaut not participate in the MTV Europe Music Awards on 7 November 2010 in Madrid, claiming that: "Sexion d'Assaut is not worthy of representing France". On 12 October 2011, an agreement was signed with the LGBT community centre, acknowledging the fulfillment of the group's commitments, and which considers the controversy to be over. Questioned by the group, the journalist who reported the comments in Hip Hop magazine saw her professional reputation destroyed and lost her business. She filed a complaint at the end of 2010 for defamation and public insult. Barack Adama, whose real name is Adama Diallo, was sentenced on 14 March 2013 to pay damages to journalist Nathalie Sorlin by the 17th chamber of the Paris tribunal de grande instance.

=== Group name ===
When choosing the name, the protagonists seemed to be totally unaware of the historical existence of the Assault Section (SA; Sturmabteilung in German), a paramilitary branch of the Nazi Party, so the name of the group does not refer to it, the members specifying moreover that "the assault sections exist in all the armies".

== Discography ==
Studio albums

- L'École des points vitaux (2010)
- L'Apogée (2012)

Compilation albums

- La Terre du Milieu (2006)
- Les Chroniques du 75 (2009)
- En attendant L'Apogée: les Chroniques du 75, Vol. 2 (2011)

Mixtapes

- Le Renouveau (2008)
- L'Écrasement de tête (2009)

Live albums

- L'Apogée à Bercy (2012)

== Awards ==
Year	Nominee / work	Award	Result
2012	"Avant qu'elle parte"	Grand prix Sacem (Rolf Marbot Song of the Year Award)	Won
2013	Themselves	NRJ Music Awards (Francophone Duo/Group of the Year)	Won
2013	"Avant qu'elle parte"	NRJ Music Awards (Francophone Song of the Year)	Won
2013	"Wati house"	Trace Urban Music Awards (Francophone Song of the Year)	Won
2013	Themselves	Trace Urban Music Awards (Best live performance)	Won
