= Wati B =

French record label

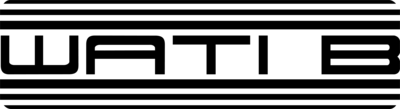
- Industry: Music and entertainment
- Founded: 2000
- Headquarters: France
- Owner: Sony Music Entertainment
- Website: wati-b.com

Wati B (/ˈwɑːti/) is a French record label established in 2000 by Dawala and rap band Intouchable and owned by Sony Music Entertainment. "Wati B" comes from wati bɛɛ, a Bamanankan expression that means "all the time". Dawala directs the operations of the label.

Due to the popularity of its signed acts across the French-speaking world, Wati B established its own "Wati B" line of fashion apparel with the first "Wati Boutique" opened on 1 February 2011 in Paris.

== Signed artists ==
The label has signed many acts including the very successful Sexion d'Assaut. It also produced Pur Son Guetto series with two volumes released.

Presently signed artists

Name	Member artists (if applicable)
Sexion d'Assaut	Maître Gims; Black Mesrimes; Lefa; Barack Adama; Maska; JR O Chrome; Doumams; L.I.O. Pétrodollars
Intouchable	Dry
L'Institut	Docteur Bériz; L'Insolent; John K L.A.S. Abou 2Being; Le H de guerre Dadif
Shin Sekaï	Dadju; Abou Tall
Charly Bell	
DJ HCue	
Lynda Sherazade	
Red Cross	Geezy Weston YB
TN Crew (dance group)	
4Keus	Tiakola Bné Djeffi HK
Moon (문)	

Previous signed acts

- Jarod
- H-magnum
- Demon One
- Maryam
- Esaloss
- Le 3e prototype – a subgrouping of Sexion d'Assaut (2005 to 2009) made up of Lefa, Maitre Gims, Barack Adama, Maska and Jeryzoos

== Major releases ==
Year	Type	Artist / Group	Title	Certifications
2001	Mixtape (compilation)	Various artists	Pur Son Ghetto vol. 1	
2003	Mixtape (compilation)	Various artists	Pur Son Ghetto vol. 2	
2005	Mixtape (compilation)	Various artists	Originale Mix-tape	
2005	Album	Intouchable	La vie de rêve	
2008	Mixtape	Sexion d'Assaut	La Terre du Milieu	
2008	Album	Dry	Les derniers seront les premiers	
2008	Street album	Sexion d'Assaut	Le Renouveau	
2008	Street album	Dry	De la pure pour les durs	
2008	Street album	Sexion d'Assaut	L'Écrasement de tête	
2009	Mixtape	Sexion d'Assaut	Les Chroniques du 75	
2010	Album	Sexion d'Assaut	L'École des points vitaux	4× Platinum
2010	Mixtape (compilation)	DJ HCue with Various artists	T Sourd Ou Quoi? Vol. 1	
2011	Mixtape	Sexion d'Assaut	En attendant L'Apogée: les Chroniques du 75	Platinum
2012	Album	Dry	Tot ou tard	
2012	Album	Sexion d'Assaut	L'Apogée	Diamond
2012	Album	Shin Sekaï	The Shin Sekaï vol. 1	
2013	Mixtape	L'Institut	Equipe de nuit	
2013	Album (compilation)	Various Artists (Collection from Wati B artists)	Les chroniques du Wati Boss - Volume 1	
2014	Album (compilation)	Various Artists (Collection from Wati B artists)	Les chroniques du Wati Boss - Volume 2	

Singles featured in

- 2012: "WatiBigAli" (Big Ali featuring Wati B)
  - Wati B represented in the single "WatiBigAli" by Black M, Dry and Shin Sekaï's Dadju.

== Awards ==
Sexion d'Assaut has won many awards including:

- December 2011: Référendum Planète Rap, "Best Single of 2011" for "Qui t'a dit?"
- December 2012: Référendum Planète Rap, "Best Single of 2012" for "Avant qu'elle parte"
- December 2012: Référendum Planète Rap, "Best Album of 2012" for " "L'Apogée""
- December 2012: Référendum Planète Rap, "Best Duo or Group of 2012"
- December 2012: Référendum Planète Rap, "Best Artist of 2012"
- January 2013: NRJ Music Awards 2013, "Best Francophone Duo or Group of 2012"
- January 2013: NRJ Music Awards 2013, "Best Francophone Song of 2012"
