= Gims discography =

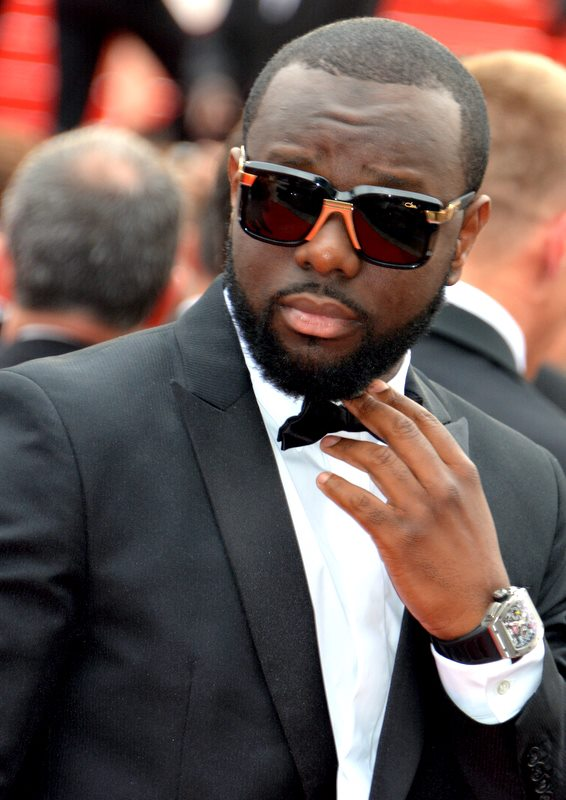
- Gims at the 2016 Cannes Film Festival
- Studio albums: 5
- EPs: 2
- Compilation albums: 2
- Singles: 55
- Music videos: 46

Gandhi Bilel Djuna (born 6 May 1986), better known by his stage name Maître Gims and more recently just Gims (sometimes stylized as GIMS), is a DR Congolese singer-songwriter and rapper. He grew up in France and currently lives in France and Morocco. He is a former member of the hip hop group Sexion d'Assaut and released his first major album, Subliminal in 2013. The album sold over a million copies in France and peaked at number two in the Syndicat National de l'Édition Phonographique. His other two albums follow: Mon cœur avait raison in 2015 and Ceinture noire in 2018 reached number one in France and Belgium (Wallonia) and peaked in the top 40 in various European countries, including Denmark, Italy and Switzerland.

He has topped the French singles charts four times, including once as a featured artist, most recently in 2018 with his song "La même". The song was the most performed in France in 2018 and it helped Gims become the most performed artist on French television and radio for the same year. In 2018, he was the 7th most performed artist in the world on Deezer. During his career he has worked with several international artists such as Sia, Pitbull, Lil Wayne, Stromae, Maluma, Sting and others. He has sold over 5 million records, including 3 million albums since the start of his career. in 2020 he won the International Artist of the Year in Distinctive International Arab Festivals Awards after his featuring in Mohamed Ramadan's song "Ya habibi". On 17 September 2020, Netflix released a documentary about the last ten years of his career titled Gims: On the Record.

The discography of Gims consists of four studio albums, five reissues, two compilations and an EPs. It also consists of twenty-nine singles (including twenty-five as a lead artist and four as a collaborating artist), thirty-two collaborations, and thirty-one video clips.

During his career, Gims obtained eight gold discs, six platinum discs, three double platinum discs, three triple platinum discs and three diamond discs. He also obtained thirty-two gold singles, seventeen platinum singles, two double platinum singles, a triple platinum single, a quadruple single platinum, a quintuple single platinum and five diamond singles.

== Albums ==
Title	Album details	Peak chart positions								Sales	Certifications
Title	Album details	FRA	BEL (Wa)	BEL (Fl)	DEN	GER	ITA	NLD	SWI	Sales	Certifications
Subliminal	Released: 20 May 2013; Label: Wati B, MMC (Standard Edition); Formats: CD, vinyl, digital download	2	1	47	—	—	—	72	11	WW: 1,100,000	FRA: 2× Diamond; BEL: Gold
Mon cœur avait raison	Released: 28 August 2015; Label: Wati B, Sony Music; Formats: CD, vinyl, digital download	1	1	24	4	—	20	40	3	WW: 1,300,000	FRA: 2× Diamond; BEL: Platinum; DEN: Platinum; SWI: Platinum
Ceinture noire	Released: 23 March 2018; Label: TF1 Group, Play Two; Formats: CD, vinyl, digital download	1	1	28	—	48	—	93	1	WW: 1,300,000	FRA: 2× Diamond; BEL: Platinum; SWI: Gold
Le fléau	Released: 4 December 2020; Label: TF1 Group, Play Two; Formats: CD, vinyl, digital download	1	7	—	—	—	—	—	14		FRA: 2× Platinum
Les dernières volontés de Mozart	Released: 2 December 2022; Label: Géante Rouge, Play Two; Formats: CD, vinyl, digital download	4	23	—	—	—	—	—	47		FRA: Platinum
"—" denotes a recording that did not chart or was not released in that territory.

== EPs ==
Title	EP details	Peak chart positions			
Title	EP details	FRA	BEL (Wa)	BEL (Fl)	SWI
Ceux qui dorment les yeux ouverts	Released: 7 December 2006; Label: Wati B; Formats: CD, digital download	—	—	—	—
Le Nord se souvient	Released: 13 September 2024; Label: TF1 Group; Formats: CD, vinyl, digital download	1	1	25	7

== Singles ==
=== As lead artist ===
List of singles as lead artist, with selected chart positions and certifications, showing year released and album name
Title	Year	Peak chart positions										Certifications	Album
Title	Year	FRA	BEL (Wa)	BEL (Fl)	DEN	GER	ITA	NLD	POR	SPA	SWI	Certifications	Album
"J'me tire"	2013	1	1	4	—	—	—	5	—	—	17	FRA: Platinum; BEL: Platinum; SWI: Gold	Subliminal
"Bella"	2013	3	3	—	—	—	—	—	—	—	25	FRA: Platinum; BEL: Gold	Subliminal
"One Shot" (featuring Dry)	2013	16	25	—	—	—	—	—	—	—	—	—N/a	Subliminal
"Ça marche" (featuring The Shin Sekaï)	2013	29	28	—	—	—	—	—	—	—	—	—N/a	Subliminal
"Changer"	2013	9	15	—	—	—	—	—	—	—	—	—N/a	Subliminal
"Zombie"	2013	3	11	—	—	—	—	—	—	—	62	FRA: Gold	Subliminal
"Warano Style"	2013	21	49	—	—	—	—	—	—	—	—	—N/a	Subliminal
"Est-ce que tu m'aimes?"	2015	3	2	19	4	—	1	—	—	—	43	BEL: Gold; FRA: Platinum; GER: Gold; ITA: 5× Platinum; DEN: 3× Platinum; SWI: Gold	Mon cœur avait raison
"Laissez passer"	2015	7	7	—	—	—	—	—	—	—	—	FRA: Gold	Mon cœur avait raison
"Brisé"	2015	6	5	—	—	—	—	—	—	—	—	FRA: Gold	Mon cœur avait raison
"Sapés comme jamais" (featuring Niska)	2015	3	2	—	—	—	—	—	—	—	—	FRA: Diamond; BEL: Gold	Mon cœur avait raison
"Tu vas me manquer"	2015	6	28	—	—	—	—	—	—	—	—	FRA: Platinum	Mon cœur avait raison
"Je te pardonne" (featuring Sia)	2015	12	8	—	—	—	—	—	—	—	—	—N/a	Mon cœur avait raison
"Zoum Zoum" (featuring Djuna Family)	2016	22	—	—	—	—	—	—	—	—	—	FRA: Gold	Non-album single
"Ma beauté"	2016	11	48	—	—	—	—	—	—	—	—	FRA: Platinum	Mon cœur avait raison
"Boucan" (featuring Jul and DJ Last One)	2016	21	44	—	—	—	—	—	—	—	—	FRA: Platinum	Mon cœur avait raison
"Tout donner"	2016	18	26	—	—	—	—	—	—	—	—	FRA: Diamond	Mon cœur avait raison
"Loin" (featuring Dany Synthé, soFLY & Nius)	2017	42	—	—	—	6	—	—	—	—	71	FRA: Platinum; SWI: Platinum; GER: Platinum	Mon cœur avait raison
"Marabout"	2017	49	—	—	—	—	—	—	—	—	—	—N/a	Non-album single
"Caméléon"	2017	11	32	—	—	—	—	—	—	—	38	FRA: Diamond; SWI: Gold	Ceinture noire
"Mi Gna (Maître Gims Remix)" (with Super Sako featuring Hayko)	2018	6	21	—	—	—	—	—	—	—	74	FRA: Platinum; SWI: Gold	Ceinture noire
"La même" (featuring Vianney or Álvaro Soler)	2018	1	1	21	—	—	—	—	—	—	24	FRA: Diamond; BEL: 2× Platinum	Ceinture noire
"Loup garou" (featuring Sofiane)	2018	3	38	—	—	—	—	—	—	—	86	FRA: Gold	Ceinture noire
"Corazón" (featuring Lil Wayne and French Montana)	2018	52	50	—	—	—	—	—	—	—	—	FRA: Gold	Ceinture noire
"Le Pire"	2018	57	—	—	—	—	—	—	—	—	—	FRA: Gold	Ceinture noire
"Anakin"	2018	80	—	—	—	—	—	—	—	—	—	—N/a	Ceinture noire
"Oulala"	2018	126	—	—	—	—	—	—	—	—	—	—N/a	Ceinture noire
"Miami Vice"	2019	39	37	—	—	—	—	—	—	—	83	FRA: Gold	Ceinture noire
"Hola Señorita" (with Maluma)	2019	15	5	—	—	—	—	—	52	23	12	FRA: Platinum; BEL: Gold; ITA: Gold; SPA: Platinum; SWI: Platinum	Ceinture noire
"Reste" (with Sting)	2019	16	9	—	—	—	—	—	169	—	91	FRA: Platinum; BEL: Gold	Ceinture noire
"Ceci n'est pas du rap" (featuring Niro)	2019	64	—	—	—	—	—	—	—	—	—	—N/a	Ceinture noire
"Le Prix à payer"	2019	172	—	—	—	—	—	—	—	—	—	—N/a	Ceinture noire
"Entre nous c'est mort"	2019	—	—	—	—	—	—	—	—	—	—	FRA: Gold	Ceinture noire
"10/10" (with Dadju and Alonzo)	2020	94	—	—	—	—	—	—	—	—	—	FRA: Gold	Ceinture noire
"Malheur, Malheur"	2020	—	—	—	—	—	—	—	—	—	—	FRA: Gold	Ceinture noire
"Yolo"	2020	46	—	—	—	—	—	—	—	—	—	—N/a	Le fléau
"Immortel"	2020	99	—	—	—	—	—	—	—	—	—	—N/a	Le fléau
"Oro Jackson" (featuring Gazo)	2020	79	—	—	—	—	—	—	—	—	—	—N/a	Le fléau
"Origami" (featuring XNilo)	2020	64	—	—	—	—	—	—	—	—	—	—N/a	Le fléau
"Jusqu'ici tout va bien"	2020	9	10	—	—	—	—	—	—	—	—	—N/a	Le fléau
"Belle" (with Dadju and Slimane)	2021	36	—	—	—	—	—	—	—	—	—	—N/a	Le fléau
"GJS" (with Jul and SCH)	2021	41	—	—	—	—	—	—	—	—	—	—N/a	Le fléau
"Only You" (featuring Dhurata Dora)	2021	84	—	—	—	—	—	—	—	—	19	—N/a	Le fléau
"Prends ma main" (with Vitaa)	2021	49	39	—	—	—	—	—	—	—	—	—N/a	Le fléau
"Maintenant"	2022	135	20	—	—	—	—	—	—	—	—	—N/a	Les dernières volontés de Mozart
"Après vous madame" (with Soolking)	2023	74	46	—	—	—	—	—	—	—	—	—N/a	Non-album singles
"Seya" (with Sativamusic and Morad)	2023	26	44	—	—	—	—	57	91	31	20	—N/a	Non-album singles
"Loco" (with Lossa)	2024	20	30	—	—	—	—	—	—	—	—	—N/a	Non-album singles
"Spider" (with Dystinct)	2024	1	1	—	—	—	—	57	—	—	17	—N/a	Le Nord se souvient
"Sois pas timide"	2024	1	1	—	—	—	—	—	—	—	—	—N/a	Le Nord se souvient
"Ohma Tokita"	2024	29	—	—	—	—	—	—	—	—	—	—N/a	Le Nord se souvient
"Ciel"	2024	1	1	—	—	—	—	—	—	—	14	—N/a	Le Nord se souvient
"Ninao"	2025	1	2	—	—	81	—	63	—	—	7	—N/a	Le Nord se souvient: L'Odyssée
"Baby"	2025	15	—	—	—	—	—	—	—	—	—	—N/a	Le Nord se souvient: L'Odyssée
"Touché" (with KeBlack)	2025	18	47	—	—	—	—	—	—	—	—	—N/a	Le Nord se souvient: L'Odyssée
"Don Diego" (RMX) (with Jala Brat and Buba Corelli)	2025	—	—	—	—	—	—	—	—	—	—	—N/a	Non-album singles
"Piano" (with Werenoi)	2025	2	13	—	—	—	—	—	—	—	—	—N/a	Non-album singles
"Appelle ta copine"	2025	6	20	—	—	—	—	—	—	—	—	FRA: Platinum	Non-album singles
"Air Force blanche" (with Jul)	2025	1	9	—	—	—	—	—	—	—	23	—N/a	Non-album singles
"Parisienne" (with La Mano 1.9)	2025	1	2	—	—	—	—	—	—	—	7	—N/a	Non-album singles
"Tu me rends bête" (with Damso)	2025	3	4	—	—	—	—	—	—	—	—	—N/a	Non-album singles
"Un monde à l'autre" (with GP Explorer, La Mano 1.9 and Sch)	2025	1	7	—	—	—	—	—	—	—	—	—N/a	Non-album singles
"Bloqué" (with L2B)	2025	8	35	—	—	—	—	—	—	—	47	—N/a	Non-album singles
"Incognito" (with R2)	2025	16	—	—	—	—	—	—	—	—	—	—N/a	Non-album singles
"Sentimental"	2025	—	31	—	—	—	—	—	—	—	—	—N/a	Non-album singles
"Spa" (with Theodora)	2026	4	18	—	—	—	—	—	—	—	21	—N/a	Non-album singles
"T'avais raison" (with Maes)	2026	8	—	—	—	—	—	—	—	—	29	—N/a	Non-album singles
"Soleil"	2026	16	—	—	—	—	—	— (Note: "Soleil" did not enter the Dutch Single Top 100, but peaked at number 22 on the Dutch Single Tip chart.)	—	—	43	—N/a	Non-album singles
"Vive la monnaie" (with Mauvais Djo)	2026	14	41	—	—	—	—	—	—	—	—	—N/a	Non-album singles
"—" denotes a recording that did not chart or was not released in that territory.

=== As featured artist ===
Single	Year	Peak positions			Certifications	Album
Single	Year	FRA	BEL (Fl)	BEL (Wa)	Certifications	Album
"Pas de nouvelle bonne nouvelle" (DJ Abdel featuring Maître Gims and Black M)	2011	84	—	—	—N/a	DJ Abdel album Evolution
"Ma mélodie" (Dry featuring Maître Gims)	2012	33	—	27	—N/a	Dry album Tôt ou tard
"Coucou" (with Colonel Reyel)	2012	149	—	—	—N/a	Colonel Reyel album Soldat de l'amour
"Fin de dream" (H Magnum featuring Maître Gims)	2013	170	—	—	—N/a	H Magnum album Fin de dream (Avant Gotham City)
"AVF" (Stromae with Maître Gims and Orelsan)	2013	43	—	38	—N/a	Stromae album Racine carrée
"Game Over" (Vitaa featuring Maître Gims)	2013	1	68	7	—N/a	Vitaa album Ici et maintenant
"Le choix" (Dry featuring Maître Gims)	2013	57	—	—	—N/a	Dry album Maintenant ou jamais
"Longueur d'avance" (Booba featuring Maître Gims)	2013	13	—	48	—N/a	Booba album Futur 2.0
"Pour commencer" (Marin Monster featuring Maître Gims)	2014	46	—	27	—N/a	Marin Monster album Marin Monster
"Prie pour moi" (Maska featuring Maître Gims)	2014	50	—	44	—N/a	Maska album Espace-temps
"Du swagg" (DJ Kayz featuring H Magnum and Maître Gims)	2014	45	—	—	—N/a	DJ Kayz album Paris Oran New York
"A contre sens" (Shaniz featuring Maître Gims)	2014	89	—	—	—N/a	Non-album single
"Laisse-moi te dire" (Mac Tyer featuring Maître Gims)	2014	40	—	38	—N/a	Mac Tyer album Je suis une légende
"Dans son sac" (Alonzo featuring Maître Gims)	2014	78	—	—	—N/a	Alonzo album Règlement de comptes
"Au cœur de Lutéce" (Hayce Lemsi featuring Maître Gims)	2015	184	—	—	—N/a	Hayce Lemsi album' 'L'or des rois
"Petit jaloux" (Lacrim featuring Maître Gims)	2015	64	—	—	—N/a	Lacrim album Ripro Vol. 2
"Pourquoi tu m'en veux?" (H Magnum featuring Maître Gims)	2016	89	—	34	—N/a	H Magnum album Gotham City
"Elle avait son djo" (Niska featuring Maître Gims)	2016	9	—	—	FRA: Gold	Niska album Zifukoro
"Tu la regardes" (John Mamann featuring Maître Gims)	2017	67	—	—	—N/a	Non-album single
"Ce soir ne sors pas" (Lacrim featuring Maître Gims)	2017	20	—	46	FRA: Platinum	Lacrim album R.I.P.R.O
"Par amour" (Dadju featuring Maître Gims)	2017	10	—	—	FRA: Diamond	Dadju Album; Gentleman 2.0
"Ma fierté" (Dadju featuring Alonzo and Maître Gims)	2017	28	—	—	FRA: Gold	Dadju Album; Gentleman 2.0
"Gotta Get Back My Baby" (Sting and Shaggy featuring Maître Gims)	2018	—	—	—	—N/a	Sting and Shaggy album 44/876
"Christophe" (Orelsan featuring Maître Gims)	2018	8	—	—	FRA: Gold	La fête est finie and Ceinture noire
"Bella ciao" (Naestro featuring Maître Gims, Vitaa, Dadju and Slimane)	2018	2	—	—	FRA: Diamond	Ceinture noire
"Baden Baden" (SCH featuring Maître Gims)	2019	59	Tip	—	—N/a	SCH album Rooftop
"On Off" (Shirin David featuring Maître Gims)	2019	—	—	—	GER: Gold	Shirin David album Supersize
"Paye" (Niro featuring Maître Gims)	2020	124	—	—	—N/a	Niro album Sale môme
"1er cœur" (Kaaris featuring Gims)	2020	32	—	—	—N/a	Kaaris album 2.7.0
"Dernier métro" (Kendji Girac featuring Gims)	2020	79	15	—	—N/a	Kendji Girac album Mi Vida
"Cesar" (Black M featuring Maître Gims)	2021	32	—	—	—N/a	Black M album Alpha
"Best Life" (Naps featuring Maître Gims)	2021	—	—	39	—N/a	Naps album Best Life
"TMO" (Issam Alnajjar featuring Mohamed Ramadan and Gims)	2023	—	—	—	—N/a	Non-album singles
"Carré OK" (Soolking featuring Gims)	2024	19	—	9	—N/a	Non-album singles
"Corazon" (Jul featuring Gims)	2025	20	—	—	—N/a	Non-album singles
"—" denotes a recording that did not chart or was not released in that territory.

*Did not appear in the official Belgian Ultratop 50 charts, but rather in the bubbling under Ultratip charts.

== Other releases and charted songs ==
List of other charted songs, with selected chart positions
Title	Year	Peak chart positions					Certifications	Album
Title	Year	FRA	BEL (Wa)	BEL (Fl)	GER	SWI	Certifications	Album
"Meurtre par strangulation"	2013	59	—	—	—	—	—N/a	Subliminal
"VQ2PQ"	2013	66	—	—	—	—	—N/a	Subliminal
"La chute"	2013	137	—	—	—	—	—N/a	Subliminal
"Épuisé"	2013	79	—	—	—	—	—N/a	Subliminal
"À la base"	2013	134	—	—	—	—	—N/a	Subliminal
"Ça décoiffe" (featuring Black M and JR O Crom)	2013	104	—	—	—	—	—N/a	Subliminal
"Où est ton arme" (featuring Maska)	2013	163	—	—	—	—	—N/a	Subliminal
"Laisse tomber" (featuring Dr Beriz and Insolent)	2013	200	—	—	—	—	—N/a	Subliminal
"Bavon" (featuring Charly Bell)	2013	92	—	—	—	—	—N/a	Les chroniques du Wati Boss
"Pas touché" (featuring Pitbull)	2013	90	—	—	—	—	—N/a	Subliminal
"Outsider" (featuring Bedjik, Dadju and Xgangs)	2013	147	—	—	—	—	—N/a	Subliminal
"Freedom" (featuring H Magnum)	2013	146	—	—	—	—	—N/a	Subliminal
"De Marseille à Paris" (featuring Bedjik, Dr Beriz, H Magnum and Soprano)	2013	58	—	—	—	—	—N/a	Subliminal
"Close Your Eyes" (featuring JR O Crom)	2013	54	—	—	—	—	—N/a	Subliminal
"You Lose"	2013	65	—	—	—	—	—N/a	Subliminal
"Monstre marin"	2013	50	—	—	—	—	—N/a	Subliminal
"Melynda Gates"	2015	112	—	—	—	—	—N/a	Mon cœur avait raison
"Longue vie" (featuring Lefa)	2015	52	—	—	—	—	—N/a	Mon cœur avait raison
"Hasta Luego"	2015	75	—	—	—	—	—N/a	Mon cœur avait raison
"Habibi"	2015	86	—	—	—	—	—N/a	Mon cœur avait raison
"Mon cœur avait raison"	2015	54	—	—	—	—	—N/a	Mon cœur avait raison
"Cadeaux"	2015	183	—	—	—	—	—N/a	Mon cœur avait raison
"ABCD"	2015	165	—	—	—	—	—N/a	Mon cœur avait raison
"La main du roi"	2015	171	—	—	—	—	—N/a	Mon cœur avait raison
"Contradiction" (featuring Barack Adama)	2015	98	—	—	—	—	—N/a	Mon cœur avait raison
"Sans rétro" (featuring Dadju)	2015	184	—	—	—	—	—N/a	Mon cœur avait raison
"Number One" (featuring H Magnum)	2015	143	—	—	—	—	—N/a	Mon cœur avait raison
"150"	2016	61	—	—	—	—	—N/a	Mon cœur avait raison
"Paname"	2016	95	—	—	—	—	—N/a	Mon cœur avait raison
"Pense à moi"	2016	55	—	—	—	—	—N/a	Mon cœur avait raison
"Tu ne le vois pas" (featuring Dadju)	2018	14	49	—	—	—	FRA: Gold	Ceinture noire
"Tu m'as dit" (featuring Bedjik)	2018	192	—	—	—	—	—N/a	Ceinture noire
"La nuit c'est fait pour dormir" (featuring Orelsan and H Magnum)	2018	148	—	—	—	—	—N/a	Ceinture noire
"Appelez la police" (featuring MHD)	2018	138	—	—	—	—	—N/a	Ceinture noire
"Tant pis"	2018	64	—	—	—	—	—N/a	Ceinture noire
"Fuegolando"	2018	175	—	—	—	—	—N/a	Ceinture noire
"Laissez-moi tranquille"	2018	141	—	—	—	—	—N/a	Ceinture noire
"Tu reviendras"	2018	31	—	—	—	—	—N/a	Ceinture noire
"Merci maman"	2018	104	—	—	—	—	—N/a	Ceinture noire
"T'es partie"	2018	69	—	—	—	—	—N/a	Ceinture noire
"Bonita"	2018	133	—	—	—	—	—N/a	Ceinture noire
"Où aller"	2018	23	35	—	—	—	—N/a	Ceinture noire
"Gunshot"	2018	150	—	—	—	—	—N/a	Ceinture noire
"Tu me l'avais promis"	2018	100	—	—	—	—	—N/a	Ceinture noire
"60%"	2018	166	—	—	—	—	—N/a	Ceinture noire
"Je t'en veux"	2018	153	—	—	—	—	—N/a	Ceinture noire
"Les roses ont des épines"	2018	89	—	—	—	—	—N/a	Ceinture noire
"Pirate" (featuring J Balvin)	2019	168	—	—	—	—	—N/a	Ceinture noire
"En secret" (featuring Vitaa)	2019	74	—	—	—	—	—N/a	Ceinture noire
"Jasmine"	2019	97	—	—	—	—	—N/a	Ceinture noire
"Naïf"	2019	109	—	—	—	—	—N/a	Ceinture noire
"Comme une ombre"	2019	94	—	—	—	—	—N/a	Ceinture noire
"Mets-moi bien"	2019	81	—	—	—	—	—N/a	Ceinture noire
"Te quiero" (with DJ Assad featuring Dhurata Dora)	2019	100	—	—	—	—	—N/a	Ceinture noire
"Côté Noir" (featuring Leto)	2020	38	—	—	—	—	—N/a	Le fléau
"Oats" (featuring Boumidjal X)	2020	86	—	—	—	—	—N/a	Le fléau
"Pendejo" (featuring Boch)	2020	58	—	—	—	—	—N/a	Le fléau
"Twenny Twenny" (featuring Tifyala)	2020	171	—	—	—	—	—N/a	Le fléau
"Og na og"	2020	193	—	—	—	—	—N/a	Le fléau
"Sicario" (featuring Heuss l'Enfoiré)	2020	32	—	—	—	—	—N/a	Le fléau
"Jetez pas l'œil" (featuring Vald)	2020	52	—	—	—	—	—N/a	Le fléau
"Grosse bleta" (featuring Kaaris)	2020	70	—	—	—	—	—N/a	Le fléau
"Dans ma tête" (featuring Jaekers)	2020	170	—	—	—	—	—N/a	Le fléau
"C'est comme ça"	2020	191	—	—	—	—	—N/a	Le fléau
"Thomas Shelby"	2020	150	—	—	—	—	—N/a	Le fléau
"C'est quoi l'del" (featuring Nekfeu)	2021	51	—	—	—	—	—N/a	Le fléau
"Mirage" (featuring Aribeatz, Ozuna and Sfera Ebbasta)	2023	53	—	—	—	—		Non-album single
"Terminal 2F" (with Dadju)	2024	26	—	—	—	—		Le Nord se souvient
"San Goku"	2024	98	—	—	—	—		Le Nord se souvient
"Diana"	2025	10	—	—	—	—	FRA: Platinum	Le Nord se souvient : L'Odyssée
"Do You Love Me?"	2025	96	—	—	—	—		
"—" denotes a recording that did not chart or was not released in that territory.
