= List of awards and nominations received by Gims =

Gims awards and nominations
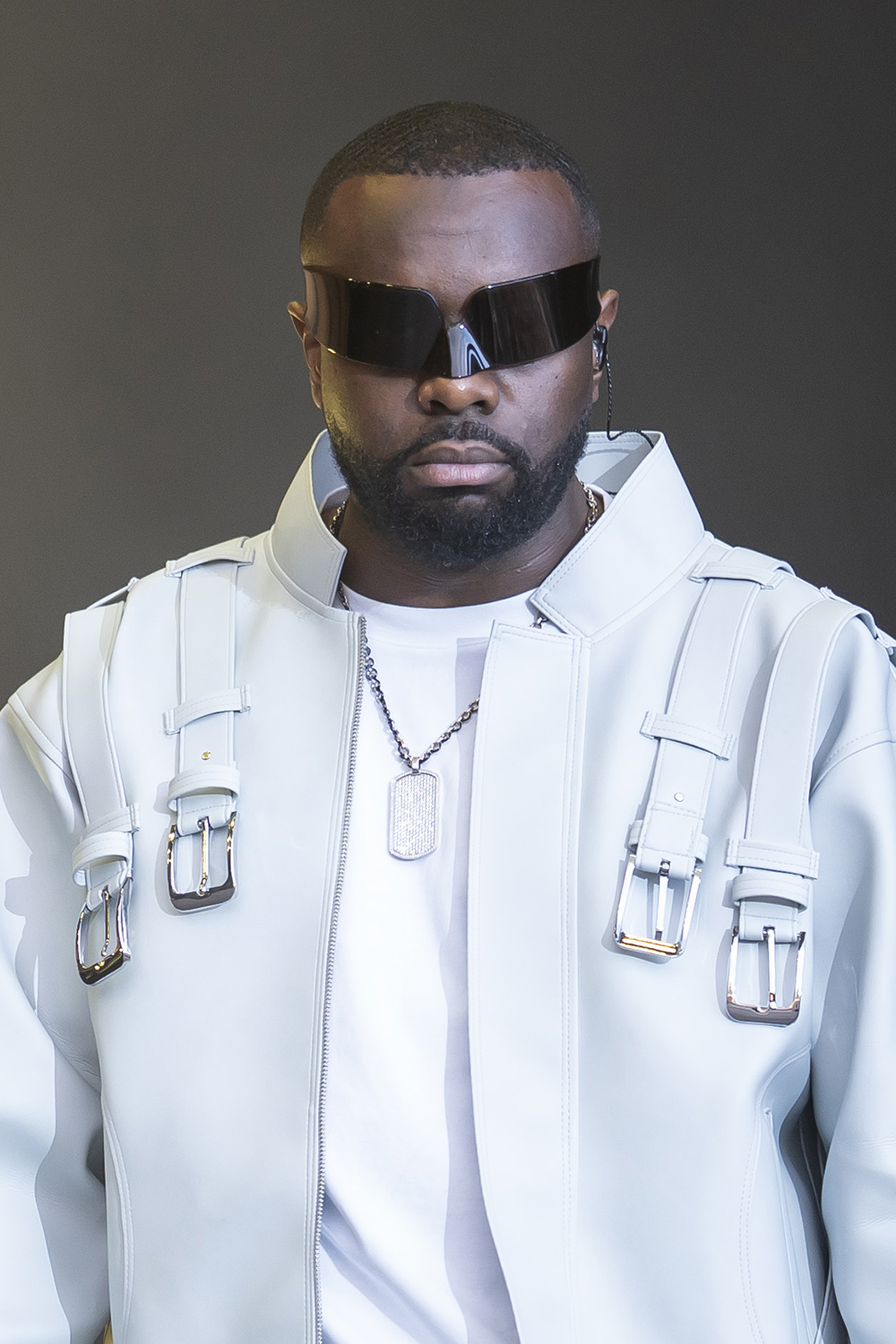
- Gims in 2025
Awards and nominations
Award	Wins	Nominations
MTV Europe	0	4
NRJ	1	12
Victoires de la Musique	1	0
W9 d'or de la musique	2	0
DIAFA	1	0

Totals (Note: Certain award groups do not simply award one winner. They acknowledge several different recipients, have runners-up, and have third place. Since this is a specific recognition and is different from losing an award, runner-up mentions are considered wins in this award tally. For simplification and to avoid errors, each award in this list has been presumed to have had a prior nomination.)
- Wins: 7
- Nominations: 29

Gandhi Bilel Djuna (born 6 May 1986), better known by his stage name Maître Gims and more recently just Gims, is a DR Congolese singer and rapper. He grew up in France and currently lives in France and Morocco.

He is a former member of the hip hop group Sexion d'Assaut and released his first major album, Subliminal in 2013. The album sold over a million copies in France and peaked at number two in the Syndicat National de l'Édition Phonographique.

His other two albums follow: Mon cœur avait raison in 2015 and Ceinture noire in 2018 reached number one in France and Belgium (Wallonia) and peaked in the top 40 in various European countries, including Denmark, Italy and Switzerland.

== Awards and nominations ==
=== NRJ Music Awards ===
Year	Nominee / work	Award	Result
2013	Himself	Francophone Male Artist of the Year	Nominated
2016	Himself	Francophone Male Artist of the Year	Nominated
2016	Himself	Francophone Duo/Group of the Year	Nominated
2016	"Sapés comme jamais"	Francophone Song of the Year	Nominated
2018	Himself	Francophone Duo/Group of the Year	Nominated
2018	Himself	Francophone Duo/Group of the Year	Nominated
2018	Himself	Francophone Male Artist of the Year	Nominated
2018	"La même"	Francophone Song of the Year	Nominated
2019	Himself	Francophone Male Artist of the Year	Nominated
2020	Himself	Francophone Male Artist of the Year	Nominated
2020	"Reste"	Francophone Collaboration of the Year	Nominated
2020	Himself	Francophone Performance of the Night	Nominated
2020	Himself	NRJ Music Award of Honor	Won
2021	Himself	Francophone Male Artist of the Year	Nominated
2021	"Only You" (feat. Dhurata Dora)	Francophone Collaboration of the Year	Nominated
2024	Himself	Francophone Male Artist of the Year	Nominated
2024	"Spider" (feat. Dystinct)	Francophone Song of the Year	Nominated
2025	Himself	Francophone Male Artist of the Year	Nominated
2025	Himself	Francophone Concert of the Year	Won
2025	"Air Force Blanche" (feat. Jul)	Francophone Song of the Year	Nominated

=== MTV Europe Music Awards ===
Year	Nominee / work	Award	Result
2013	Himself	Award for Best French Act	Nominated
2014	Himself	Award for Best French Act	Nominated
2016	Himself	Award for Best French Act	Nominated
2020	Himself	Award for Best French Act	Nominated
2024	Himself	Award for Best French Act	Nominated

=== Victoires de la Musique ===
Year	Nominee / work	Award	Result
2014	Subliminal	Urban Music Album of the Year	Nominated
2014	"J'me tire"	Original Song of the Year	Nominated
2016	"Sapés comme jamais"	Original Song of the Year	Won
2025	Himself	Best male artist	Won

=== W9 d'or de la musique ===
Year	Nominee / work	Award	Result
2016	"Sapés comme jamais"	Most streamed French song	Won
2016	"Sapés comme jamais"	Most viewed French music video on the internet	Won

=== Trace Awards ===
Year	Nominee / work	Award	Result
2014	Himself	Best Artist	Nominated
2014	"Prie pour moi" (with. Maska)	Best Group / Best Collaboration	Nominated

=== Other awards and nominations ===
Year	Nominee / work	Award	Result
2020	Himself	DIAFA (International Artist of the Year)	Won
2023	Himself	Latin American Music Awards (Best Artist)	Nominated
2023	"Arhbo" (with. Ozuna)	Latin American Music Awards (Best Collaboration)	Nominated
