= Sois pas timide =

Single by Gims

from the EP Le Nord se souvient
- Released: 19 July 2024
- Genre: Pop rap
- Length: 2:45
- Label: Géante Rouge
- Producer: Young Bouba

Music video
- "Sois pas timide" on YouTube

"Sois pas timide" (French for "dont be shy") is a song by French-Congolese singer Gims released in July 2024. It has stayed in the French top 40 charts for more than a year.

== Realization ==
The song produced by Young Bouba, who has already worked with Gims on many occasions. The music video was filmed overseas in North America, and was realized by NONO. It has been praised as bright and colorful.

== Lyricism ==
The lyrics have been theorized to reference Gims' wife DemDem.

== Charts ==
Along with Gims' "Ninao", the song was placed in the top 5 most popular songs of 2025 among French adolescents.

=== Weekly charts ===
Chart (2024)	Peak position
Belgium (Ultratop 50 Wallonia)	1
France (SNEP)	1
Switzerland (Schweizer Hitparade)	21

=== Year-end charts ===
Chart (2025)	Position
Belgium (Ultratop 50 Wallonia)	9
