= Ciel (Gims song) =

Single by Gims

from the EP Le Nord se souvient
- Released: 13 September 2024
- Genre: Pop rap
- Length: 3:06
- Label: Géante Rouge
- Producer: Maximum Beats

Music video
- "Ciel" on YouTube

"Ciel" is a song by Congolese singer Gims released in September 2024. Throughout 2024 and 2025 it climbed the French charts, peaking at number one for 10 weeks. It peaked the song peak at number one in France and Wallonia. In June, six months after its release, the song reached 100 Million streams on the digital streaming platform Spotify.

One week after the release, its music video was filmed in Verbier, a ski resort in south-western Switzerland.

In August 2025, a video went viral on French social media of a youth camp in Verbier singing a remix of the song in which some lyrics have been altered in order to make the song more Christian-themed.

== Charts ==
| Chart (2024) | Peak position |
|---|---|
| Belgium (Ultratop 50 Wallonia) | 1 |
| France (SNEP) | 1 |
| Netherlands (Single Top 100) | 57 |
| Switzerland (Schweizer Hitparade) | 14 |
