= Espace-temps =

Studio album by Maska
- Released: October 20, 2014
- Recorded: 2013–2014
- Genre: Hip hop, rap, political hip hop
- Label: Wati B, Jive Epic, Sony Music

Maska chronology
Espace-temps (2014)	Akhal Teke (2017)

Singles from Espace-temps
- 1. "Prie pour moi" Released: 9 May 2014; 2. "Rahh" Released: 1 August 2014; 3. "Profiter de ma life" Released: 29 August 2014; 4. "Yin / Yang" Released: 14 October 2014; 5. "Espace-temps" Released: 12 November 2014; 6. "Rien sans les autres" Released: 3 December 2014

Espace-temps (English: Space-time) is the debut solo album by French singer and rapper Maska released on October 20, 2014. It has 15 tracks. There are several thousand copies sold thanks to flagship titles such as "Prie pour moi" (feat. Gims), "Profite de ma life" (ft DR Beriz and Black M, with the exclusive participation of Noom Diawara for the clip) or "Rien sans Les autres".

== Genesis ==
After the enormous success of Sexion d'Assaut, the various members of the group embark on solo projects. If Lefa and Barack Adama are withdrawing from the music industry, this is not the case for Gims who, in 2013, released his first album Subliminal which was a public success with around 1,100,000 copies sold. In 2014, Black M in turn embarked on a solo career with the release of his album Les yeux plus gros que le monde, which sold just under 900,000 copies.

Building on the success of his predecessors, Maska also undertook to make an album. It is Gims who reveals, during his Planète Rap which is dedicated to him, the return of Maska in solo.

== Promotion ==
For the promotion of the album, Maska unveils as Gims and Black M, a web series which has the name of the album Espace-temps where there are titles that are not in the album. :

- Episode I: "Mon mal être" ft. Dr Beriz
- Episode II: "Un grain de folie" is the second episode of the series En attendant Espace Temps by Maska. In this excerpt, Maska stirs up the hatred of a man married to a woman, and whose latter, cheats on him and prefers him with Maska "I have a grain of madness, I charmed your gow"; "I squeezed your go, so you scratched my gov '. She prefers my skin and wants to be your mate". The clip, has since been deleted from the YouTube platform.
- Episode III: "Ça va aller" is the third episode of Maska's En attendant Espace Temps series. The song is a message of hope for all those who have to overcome hardships in their life: "Your wife is leaving you, you're sad, it's going to be fine. Your boss fires you, you're afraid, it's going to be fine. you are sick, it will be fine. A loved one has died, it is hard to swallow ". However, he encourages to get up and fight "I fell, I got up but the fall leaves marks I see that the weak are moving away but I don't stop fighting" The clip to meanwhile, it has been viewed more than 1,000,000 times.
- Episode IV: "Parcours de rêve" On February 5, 2014, Maska released the third episode of his series. It is called "Parcours De Rêve". In this music, Maska retraces his journey, from these beginnings (in 2002) to today. Filmed in Guadeloupe in 2013, it has been viewed nearly 500,000 times.
- Episode V: Let the artist pass "Laisse passer l'artiste" is the fifth episode of the series En attendant Espace Temps by Maska. In this sound, the rapper from Lozère is quite provocative, especially with the competition: "Please, stay down, I like being alone at the top"; "I'm here for the cup, I'm not coming to lose".
- Episode VI: Drapeau tâché de sang In a text stuffed with punchlines that question national identity. "France is beautiful but it pains me" chanted the artist, who regrets "States that stuff themselves", "to the point of shitting on their people".

== Track listing ==
No.	Title	Lyrics	Producer(s)	Length
1.	"Sommaire"	Maska	Gims; Stan-E	5:23
2.	"J'implose" (feat. The Shin Sekaï)	Maska; Dadju	Gims; Stan-E	3:10
3.	"Ère du length"	Maska	Stan-E; Shyne Bangerz	3:36
4.	"Prie pour moi" (feat. Gims)	Maska; Gims	Renaud Rebillaud	4:09
5.	"Rien sans les autres"	Maska	Dany Synthé	3:36
6.	"Mes peines perdues" (feat. Lynda)	Maska	Cello; Casa One	3:58
7.	"Qui les a blessés ?" (feat. Dadju)	Maska; Dadju	Renaud Rebillaud; Maska	4:00
8.	"Profiter de ma life" (feat. Black M & Dr Beriz)	Maska; Black M; Dr Beriz	Renaud Rebillaud; Maska	3:01
9.	"Yin / Yang" (feat. Abou Debeing)	Maska; Abou Debeing	Shine Bangerz	5:01
10.	"Tout le mal" (feat. Stan-E)	Maska; Stan-E	Stan-E	4:13
11.	"Relativise" (feat. Abou Tall)	Maska; Abou Tall	Maska; Renaud Rebillaud	3:34
12.	"Rahh"	Maska	Oster	3:48
13.	"Mama"	Maska	Maska; Renaud Rebillaud	3:36
14.	"Prêt à tout"	Maska	Maska; Stan-E	3:54
15.	"Espace-length"	Maska	Oster	5:04

== Charts ==
Charts	Peak Position
Belgian Albums (Ultratop Wallonia)	120
French Albums (SNEP)	14
