= Saïd Boussif =

French music executive (born 1989)

- Born: December 16, 1989 (age 35); Toulon, France
- Occupations: Music executive; management

Saïd Boussif (born December 16, 1989) is a music executive and management for several French singers such as Maître Gims, Dadju, Vitaa, Amel Bent, Slimane, and Camélia Jordana. In 2016, he was cofounder and CEO of Indifference Prod.
