= Spider (Gims song) =

Single by Gims and Dystinct

from the EP Le Nord se souvient
- Released: 11 May 2024
- Genre: Pop rap
- Length: 3:08
- Label: Believe
- Composers: Gims; Inso Le Véritable; Young Bouba; Narco Verra; Maximum
- Lyricists: Gims; Dystinct; Habib Bamba; Mbarek Nouali
- Producers: Maximum; Narco Verra Beatz; Young Bouba

Gims singles chronology
"Joe Pesci" (2024)	"Spider" (2024)	"Mamacita" (2024)

Dystinct singles chronology
"Salam" (2024)	"Spider" (2024)	"Dayanamam" (2024)

Music video
- "Spider" on YouTube

"Spider" is a song by Congolese singer Gims with Belgian rapper Dystinct. Released in May 2024, the song peak at number one in France and Wallonia.

== Charts ==
=== Weekly charts ===
Chart (2024)	Peak position
Belgium (Ultratop 50 Wallonia)	1
France (SNEP)	1
Netherlands (Single Top 100)	57
North Africa (IFPI)	1
Switzerland (Schweizer Hitparade)	17

=== Year-end charts ===
Chart (2025)	Position
France (SNEP)	12
Switzerland (Schweizer Hitparade)	59
