= Caméléon (song) =

Single by Maître Gims

from the album Ceinture noire
- Released: 10 November 2017
- Genre: French rap
- Length: 3:58
- Songwriters: Vitaa; Maître Gims; Renaud Rebillaud; H-Magnum

Music video
- "Caméléon" (Clip officiel) on YouTube

"Caméléon" is a song by Congolese singer and rapper Maître Gims released in November 2017. The song has so far peaked at number seven on the French Singles Chart.

== Charts ==
Chart (2017)	Peak position
France (SNEP)	7
Switzerland (Schweizer Hitparade)	38

== Certifications ==
Region	Certification	Certified units/sales
France (SNEP)	Diamond	333,333^{‡}
Switzerland (IFPI Switzerland)	Gold	10,000^{‡}
^{‡} Sales+streaming figures based on certification alone.
