= Est-ce que tu m'aimes? =

Single by Maître Gims

from the album Mon cœur avait raison
- Released: 27 April 2015
- Genre: Pop; soul
- Length: 3:56
- Songwriters: Maître Gims; Renaud Rebillaud

Maître Gims singles chronology
"Warano Style" (2013)	"Est-ce que tu m'aimes?" (2015)	"Melynda Gates" (2015)

Music video
- "Est-ce que tu m'aimes?" on YouTube

"Est-ce que tu m'aimes?" (pronounced [ɛs kə ty m‿ɛm], English: "Do You Love Me?") is a song by Congolese singer and rapper Gims (then known as "Maître Gims") from the album Mon cœur avait raison.

== Music video ==
The music video was released on 4 May 2015. Filmed in Paris and New York, it shows people in various phases of their often difficult relationships. Some interior scenes were filmed at the Guimet Museum. The video has more than 570 million views on YouTube as of January 2026.

== Charts ==
=== Weekly charts ===
Chart (2015–16)	Peak position
Belgium (Ultratop 50 Flanders)	19
Belgium (Ultratop 50 Wallonia)	2
Czech Republic Airplay (ČNS IFPI)	3
Czech Republic Singles Digital (ČNS IFPI)	44
Denmark (Tracklisten)	4
France (SNEP)	3
Italy (FIMI)	1
Slovakia Airplay (ČNS IFPI)	61
Switzerland (Schweizer Hitparade)	43

Chart (2023)	Peak position
Netherlands (Single Tip)	23

=== Year-end charts ===
Chart (2015)	Position
Belgium (Ultratop Flanders)	76
Belgium (Ultratop Wallonia)	16
France (SNEP)	16

Chart (2016)	Position
Denmark (Tracklisten)	13
Italy (FIMI)	17

== Certifications ==
Region	Certification	Certified units/sales
Belgium (BRMA)	Gold	15,000^{*}
Denmark (IFPI Danmark)	4× Platinum	360,000^{‡}
France (SNEP)	Platinum	200,000^{‡}
Germany (BVMI)	Gold	200,000^{‡}
Italy (FIMI)	5× Platinum	250,000^{‡}
Poland (ZPAV)	Gold	25,000^{‡}
^{*} Sales figures based on certification alone.^{‡} Sales+streaming figures based on certification alone.
