= Ceux qui dorment les yeux ouverts =

EP by Gims
- Released: 7 December 2006
- Recorded: 2004–2006
- Genre: Hip hop
- Length: 31:57
- Label: Wati B

Gims chronology
Ceux qui dorment les yeux ouverts (2006)	Subliminal (2013)

Ceux qui dorment les yeux ouverts (Those who sleep with their eyes open) is an extended play by Congolese-French rapper Gims, which was released on 7 December 2006. It was also Gims's first solo project produced by Wati B. He also participated with the group Sexion d'Assaut in some songs. The disc contains nine songs.

== Background ==
In parallel with his career with Sexion d'Assaut, Gims tried his hand at musical composition. At the end of 2006, he released his first solo project, a maxi entitled Ceux qui dorment les yeux ouverts.

The extended play was produced by ATK's Fredy K and Noko. With very few copies pressed, the disc aimed to make Gims known to the general public. The record features tracks with Sexion d'Assaut, Scred Connexion rapper Koma and a singer named Carole.

== Track listing ==
No.	Title	Length
1.	"Eh Merde!"	4:18
2.	"L'Arrière Plan"	4:41
3.	"Je Dors Les Yeux Ouverts" (featuring Koma)	3:48
4.	"L'Èspéciment De L'Espèce Humaine" (featuring Carole)	3:38
5.	"Tsunami permanent" (featuring Sexion d'Assaut)	3:47
6.	"Sale Époque"	4:13
7.	"M'Arrêter"	3:50
8.	"Derniere épreuve"	4:30
9.	"Du Coq à l'Ane"	5:29
Total length:		31:57

== Release history ==
Country	Date	Label	Format
France	7 December 2006	Wati B	CD, digital download
