= Game Over (Vitaa song) =

2013 single by Vitaa and Maître Gims

Single by Vitaa featuring Maître Gims

from the album Ici et maintenant
- Released: 23 September 2013
- Genre: Electropop; R&B
- Length: 3:16
- Label: Def Jam
- Songwriter(s): Vitaa; Maître Gims; Renaud Rebillaud
- Producer(s): Maître Gims; Renaud Rebillaud

Vitaa featuring Maître Gims singles chronology
"Pour que tu restes" (2010)	"Game Over" (2013)	"Liham" (2013)

Music video
- "Game Over" on YouTube

"Game Over" is a song by French singer Vitaa, featuring vocals from Congolese-French rapper and singer Maître Gims. It was released as the lead single from Vitaa's third album, Ici et maintenant. Released on 23 September 2013, the song hit number one on the SNEP singles chart on 2 November 2013, becoming Vitaa's first number one song and Maître Gims' second.

== Charts ==
=== Weekly charts ===
Chart (2013)	Peak position
Belgium (Ultratip Bubbling Under Flanders)	68
Belgium (Ultratop 50 Wallonia)	7
France (SNEP)	1

=== Year-end charts ===
Chart (2013)	Position
Belgium (Ultratop Wallonia)	80
France (SNEP)	33

Chart (2014)	Position
France (SNEP)	137
