= Monstre Marin Corporation =

Record label

- Parent company: Universal Music France
- Founded: 2013
- Founder: Gims
- Defunct: 13 January 2020
- Genre: Hip hop; Afropop; pop; R&B
- Country of origin: France
- Location: Paris, France
- Official website: www.monstremarincorporation.com

Monstre Marin Corporation (Sea Monster Corporation) known as MMC was a French record label, located in Paris. It was founded by rapper and singer Gims, and was affiliated with the Universal Music France record company. The first compilation of the label La Monster Party chapitre 1 was published on 30 June 2014. At the same time, Gims opened a management firm called Warano Consulting.

== History ==
In 2013, Gims founded Monstre Marin Corporation with Pascal Nègre. The latter announces the direct integration of MMC into Universal. "Maître Gims is one of the most gifted artists of his generation! I am delighted to accompany him with Universal Music in his discovery of new talents and in the development of his label Sea Monster," he explains on his Twitter page. The label's logo was unveiled in early 2014.

In February 2014, L'Algérino joined the label, followed in June 2014 by Mac Tyer. Monstre Marin Corporation published its first compilation La Monster Party chapitre 1 on 30 June 2014. According to BFM TV, Gims sold 50% of the label Monstre Marin Corporation in 2014 for 500,000 euros. This structure sold to Universal Music France brought together many artists such as Vitaa, Souf, Mac Tyer, L'Algérino, MA2X, Lartiste or even the Marin Monster duo, now all gone and replaced by emerging artists like DJ Arafat, DJ Last One, Amalya or Savana blues.

The label ended its activities on 13 January 2020.

== Artists ==
=== Former artists ===
- Amalya
- L'Algérino
- Vitaa
- Lartiste
- Ma2x
- Mac Tyer
- X-Gangs
- L'Insolent
- Saty Djelass
- Souf
- Cinco
- DJ Arafat
- Savana blues
- Louka
- DJ Last One
- Syam
- Kaaris

=== Former groupes ===
- Marin Monster
- Dr Yaro & Lafolie

== Producers ==
- Yalatif Beatz (composer)
- Double X (composer

== Discography ==
=== Studio albums ===
- 2014: Aigle Royal (L'Algérino)
- 2014: Marin Monster (Marin Monster)
- 2015: Je suis une légende (Mac Tyer)
- 2015: La Même (Vitaa)
- 2016: Toujours le même (Ma2x)
- 2016: Maestro (Lartiste)
- 2016: Alchimie (Souf)
- 2017: Yorogang (DJ Arafat)

=== Compilation albums ===
- 2014: La Monster Party chapitre 1

=== Extended plays ===
- 2016: Amalya EP (Amalya)
