= Gims: On the Record =

- Film poster
- Produced by: Florent Bodin
- Narrated by: Gims
- Production company: Netflix
- Release date: 17 September 2020
- Running time: 96 minutes

GIMS: On the Record It is a documentary and musical film released on 17 September 2020, produced by the American production and entertainment company Netflix. The film tells about the career of Congolese hip-hop singer Gims in the last ten years, the running time is 1 hour 36 minutes. On the Internet Movie Database, the film received a rating of 6.9.
