= Reste =

Single by Gims featuring Sting

from the album Ceinture noire
- Released: 23 August 2019
- Genre: Pop
- Length: 3:51
- Label: Play Two, Chahawat, Sony Music
- Producer: Renaud Rebillaud

Gims singles chronology
"Hola Señorita" (2019)	"Reste" (2019)	"Ceci n'est pas du rap" (2019)

Sting singles chronology
"Morning Is Coming" (2018)	"Reste" (2019)	"2 In a Million" (2019)

Music video
- "Reste" on YouTube

"Reste" (Stay) is a song performed by Congolese singer and rapper Gims with the participation of British singer Sting, released on 23 August 2019. The song is taken from Transcendance (reissue of the Ceinture noire album) released in April 2019. It is the thirteenth single from the Ceinture noire album and the third of its reissue. The song was also included in Sting's Duets compilation album (2021).

== Charts ==
Chart (2019–20)	Peak position
Belgium (Ultratip Bubbling Under Flanders)	–
Belgium (Ultratop 50 Wallonia)	9
Canada Hot 100 (Billboard)	32
France (SNEP)	16
Hungary (Rádiós Top 40)	30
Hungary (Single Top 40)	2
Portugal (AFP)	169
Romania (Airplay 100)	70
Switzerland (Schweizer Hitparade)	91

== Certifications ==
Region	Certification	Certified units/sales
Belgium (BRMA)	Gold	20,000^{‡}
France (SNEP)	Platinum	200,000^{‡}
^{‡} Sales+streaming figures based on certification alone.
