= 10/10 (Maître Gims song) =

Single by Maître Gims featuring Dadju & Alonzo

from the album Ceinture noire
- Released: February 5, 2020
- Recorded: 2019
- Genre: Hip-hop, rap
- Length: 3:58
- Songwriters: Renaud Rebillaud, Gandhi Djuna & H Magnum
- Producer: Renaud Rebillaud

Maître Gims singles chronology
| "Entre nous, c'est mort" (2019) | "10/10" (2020) | "Malheur, malheur" (2020) |

Dadju singles chronology
| "Ma vie" (2019) | "10/10" (2020) | "Meleğim" (2020) |

Alonzo singles chronology
| "Freestyle Vourra" (2019) | "10/10" (2020) | "1ère fois" (2020) |

Music video
- "10/10" on YouTube

10/10 (or 10 sur 10) is a song by Congolese-French singer and rapper Maître Gims featuring French rappers, Dadju and Alonzo.

== Charts ==
| Chart (2020) | Peak position |
|---|---|
| Belgium (Ultratip Bubbling Under Wallonia) | 6 |
| France (SNEP) | 94 |

== Certifications ==
| Region | Certification | Certified units/sales |
|---|---|---|
| France (SNEP) | Gold | 100,000^{‡} |
^{‡} Sales+streaming figures based on certification alone.
