= Tout donner =

2016 song by Maître Gims

Single by Maître Gims

from the album Mon cœur avait raison
- Released: 11 November 2016
- Genre: Pop rap, R&B
- Length: 3:25
- Label: Wati B
- Songwriters: Gandhi Djuna; Dany Synthé
- Producer: Dany Synthé

Maître Gims singles chronology
"Ma beauté" (2016)	"Tout donner" (2016)	"Loin" (2017)

Music video
- "Tout donner" on YouTube

"Tout donner" is a song by Congolese singer and rapper Maître Gims released on 11 November 2016. It is the last song by Gims released on the Wati B label.

== Charts ==
=== Weekly charts ===
Chart (2016)	Peak position
Belgium (Ultratop 50 Wallonia)	26
France (SNEP)	18

=== Year-end charts ===
Chart (2017)	Position
France (SNEP)	103
