= Yolo (Gims song) =

Single by Gims

from the album Le Fléau
- Released: 28 August 2020
- Genre: Pop
- Length: 3:18
- Label: Play Two, Chahawat, Sony Music
- Producer: Boumidjal X

Gims singles chronology
"Origami" (2020)	"Yolo" (2020)	"Oro Jackson" (2020)

Music video
- "Yolo" on YouTube

"Yolo" is a song performed by Congolese singer and rapper Gims, released on 28 August 2020. The song is the first single from the album Le Fléau. It is written by Gims, composed by Boumidjal X. It was released on 28 August 2020 the first single from the album Le Fléau under the labels Play Two, Chahawat and Sony Music.

Yolo is inspired by the Congolese origins of Gims. The title is none other than the name of his childhood neighborhood in Kinshasa in the Democratic Republic of the Congo.

== Music video ==
The video clip released on 2 September 2020. The clip has over 19,727,429 views to date.

== Charts ==
Chart (2021)	Peak position
France (SNEP)	46

== Release history ==
Country	Date	Label	Format
Worldwide	28 August 2020	Play Two, Chahawat, Sony Music	CD, digital download
