= Tu vas me manquer =

Single by Maître Gims

from the album Mon cœur avait raison
- Released: 11 December 2015
- Genre: R&B
- Length: about 4:10
- Songwriters: Gandhi Djuna; Renaud Rebillaud

Music video
- "Tu vas me manquer" on YouTube

"Tu vas me manquer" (English:I'm going to miss you) is a song by Congolese singer and rapper Maître Gims from the album Mon cœur avait raison. It peaked at No 6 on the French Singles Chart on 22 January 2016.

== Charts ==
=== Weekly charts ===
Chart (2015–2016)	Peak position
Belgium (Ultratop 50 Wallonia)	28
France (SNEP)	6

=== Year-end charts ===
Chart (2016)	Position
France (SNEP)	86

== Certifications ==
Region	Certification	Certified units/sales
France (SNEP)	Platinum	133,333^{‡}
^{‡} Sales+streaming figures based on certification alone.
