= Ma beauté =

2016 song by Maître Gims

Single by Maître Gims

from the album Mon cœur avait raison
- Released: 3 June 2016
- Genre: French pop
- Length: 3:04
- Label: Wati B
- Songwriters: Gandhi Djuna; Dany Synthé

Maître Gims singles chronology
"Je te pardonne" (2016)	"Ma beauté" (2016)	"Tout donner" (2016)

Music video
- "Ma beauté" on YouTube

"Ma beauté" is a song by Congolese singer and rapper Maître Gims released in 2016.

== Music video ==
The song's music video was released in June 2016 and was shot in the Côte d'Azur in France. It garnered over 64 million views.

== Charts ==
Chart (2016)	Peak position
Belgium (Ultratop 50 Wallonia)	48
France (SNEP)	11

== Certifications ==
Region	Certification	Certified units/sales
France (SNEP)	Platinum	133,333^{‡}
^{‡} Sales+streaming figures based on certification alone.
