= MTV Europe Music Award for Best French Act =

Category of MTV Europe Music Awards

The following is a list of the MTV Europe Music Award winners and nominees for Best French Act.

== Winners and nominees ==
Winners are listed first and highlighted in bold.

=== 1990s ===
| Year | Artist | Ref |
|---|---|---|
1994
| 1994 | **Alain Bashung ^{[a]}** | |

=== 2000s ===
| Year | Artist | Ref |
|---|---|---|
2000
| 2000 | **Modjo** | |
| 2000 | Laurent Garnier | |
| 2000 | Phoenix | |
| 2000 | Saian Supa Crew | |
| 2000 | Bob Sinclar | |
2001
| 2001 | **Manu Chao** | |
| 2001 | Daft Punk | |
| 2001 | Demon | |
| 2001 | St. Germain | |
| 2001 | Supermen Lovers | |
2002
| 2002 | **Indochine** | |
| 2002 | David Guetta | |
| 2002 | MC Solaar | |
| 2002 | Pleymo | |
| 2002 | Saian Supa Crew | |
2003
| 2003 | **Kyo** | |
| 2003 | Berenice | |
| 2003 | Jenifer | |
| 2003 | One-T | |
| 2003 | Bob Sinclar | |
2004
| 2004 | **Jenifer** | |
| 2004 | Calogero | |
| 2004 | Corneille | |
| 2004 | IAM | |
| 2004 | Luke | |
2005
| 2005 | **Superbus** | |
| 2005 | Amel Bent | |
| 2005 | Kyo | |
| 2005 | Raphael | |
| 2005 | Sinik | |
2006
| 2006 | **Diam's** | |
| 2006 | 113 | |
| 2006 | Rohff | |
| 2006 | Olivia Ruiz | |
| 2006 | Bob Sinclar | |
2007
| 2007 | **Justice** | |
| 2007 | Booba | |
| 2007 | Fatal Bazooka | |
| 2007 | Bob Sinclar | |
| 2007 | Soprano | |
2008
| 2008 | **Zaho** | |
| 2008 | BB Brunes | |
| 2008 | Feist | |
| 2008 | David Guetta | |
| 2008 | Sefyu | |
2009
| 2009 | **Orelsan** | |
| 2009 | David Guetta | |
| 2009 | Rohff | |
| 2009 | Olivia Ruiz | |
| 2009 | Sliimy | |

=== 2010s ===
| Year | Artist | Ref |
|---|---|---|
2010
| 2010 | **Pony Pony Run Run** | |
| 2010 | Ben l'Oncle Soul | |
| 2010 | David Guetta | |
| 2010 | Phoenix | |
| 2010 | ~~Sexion D'Assaut~~ | |
2011
| 2011 | **La Fouine** | |
| 2011 | Ben l'Oncle Soul | |
| 2011 | David Guetta | |
| 2011 | Martin Solveig | |
| 2011 | Soprano | |
2012
| 2012 | **Shaka Ponk** | |
| 2012 | Irma | |
| 2012 | Orelsan | |
| 2012 | Sexion D'Assaut | |
| 2012 | Tal | |
2013
| 2013 | **Shaka Ponk** | |
| 2013 | C2C | |
| 2013 | Daft Punk | |
| 2013 | Maitre Gims | |
| 2013 | Tal | |
2014
| 2014 | **Indila** | |
| 2014 | Casseurs Flowters | |
| 2014 | Christine and the Queens | |
| 2014 | Indila | |
| 2014 | Julien Doré | |
| 2014 | Pre-nominations: Tal; Black M; Fauve; TEAM BS; Maître Gims | |
2015
| 2015 | **Black M** | |
| 2015 | The Avener | |
| 2015 | Christine and the Queens | |
| 2015 | The Dø | |
| 2015 | Fréro Delavega | |
2016
| 2016 | **Amir** | |
| 2016 | Fréro Delavega | |
| 2016 | Jain | |
| 2016 | Maître Gims | |
| 2016 | Nekfeu | |
2017
| 2017 | **Amir** | |
| 2017 | Feder | |
| 2017 | MHD | |
| 2017 | Petit Biscuit | |
| 2017 | Soprano | |
2018
| 2018 | **Bigflo & Oli** | |
| 2018 | Louane | |
| 2018 | Dadju | |
| 2018 | Vianney | |
| 2018 | OrelSan | |
2019
| 2019 | **Kendji Girac** | |
| 2019 | Aya Nakamura | |
| 2019 | Dadju | |
| 2019 | DJ Snake | |
| 2019 | Soprano | |

=== 2020s ===
| Year | Artist | Ref |
|---|---|---|
2020
| 2020 | **Matt Pokora** | |
| 2020 | Soprano | |
| 2020 | Slimane et Vitaa | |
| 2020 | GIMS | |
| 2020 | Aya Nakamura | |
2021
| 2021 | **Amel Bent** | |
| 2021 | Dadju | |
| 2021 | Jérémy Frérot | |
| 2021 | Tayc | |
| 2021 | Vianney | |
2022
| 2022 | **Amir** | |
| 2022 | Aya Nakamura | |
| 2022 | Orelsan | |
| 2022 | Soolking | |
| 2022 | Tayc | |
2023
| 2023 | **Bigflo & Oli** | |
| 2023 | Aime Simone | |
| 2023 | Aya Nakamura | |
| 2023 | Louane | |
| 2023 | Ninho | |
| 2023 | Slimane | |
2024
| 2024 | **Pierre Garnier** | |
| 2024 | Aya Nakamura | |
| 2024 | Dadju & Tayc | |
| 2024 | Gims | |
| 2024 | Slimane | |
| 2024 | Vitaa | |

^{^[a]}Local Hero Award — France
