= Les dernières volontés de Mozart =

Studio album by Gims
- Released: 2 December 2022
- Recorded: 2020–2022
- Studio: Paris, France
- Genre: Rap; Variety; Pop; Beatboxing
- Label: TF1 Group; Play Two; Géante Rouge; Indifférence Prod

Gims chronology
Le fléau (2020)	Les dernières volontés de Mozart (2022)	Le Nord se souvient (2024)

Singles from LDVM
- 1. "Maintenant" Released: 30 September 2022; 2. "Thémistocle" Released: 10 November 2022; 3. "Après-vous madame" Released: 25 November 2022; 4. "Demain" Released: 25 November 2022; 5. "Mama" Released: 17 March 2023

Les dernières volontés de Mozart (English: The Last Will of Mozart) or LDVM (Symphony) is the fifth studio album by Congolese-French singer and rapper Gims, which was released on 2 December 2022 on the TF1 Group and Play Two labels.

== Genesis ==
On 5 October 2022, Gims revealed the album's title, its release date and its cover. At the same time, the pre-order of the record was made available, accompanied by three tickets, gold, platinum and diamond to be won.

== History ==
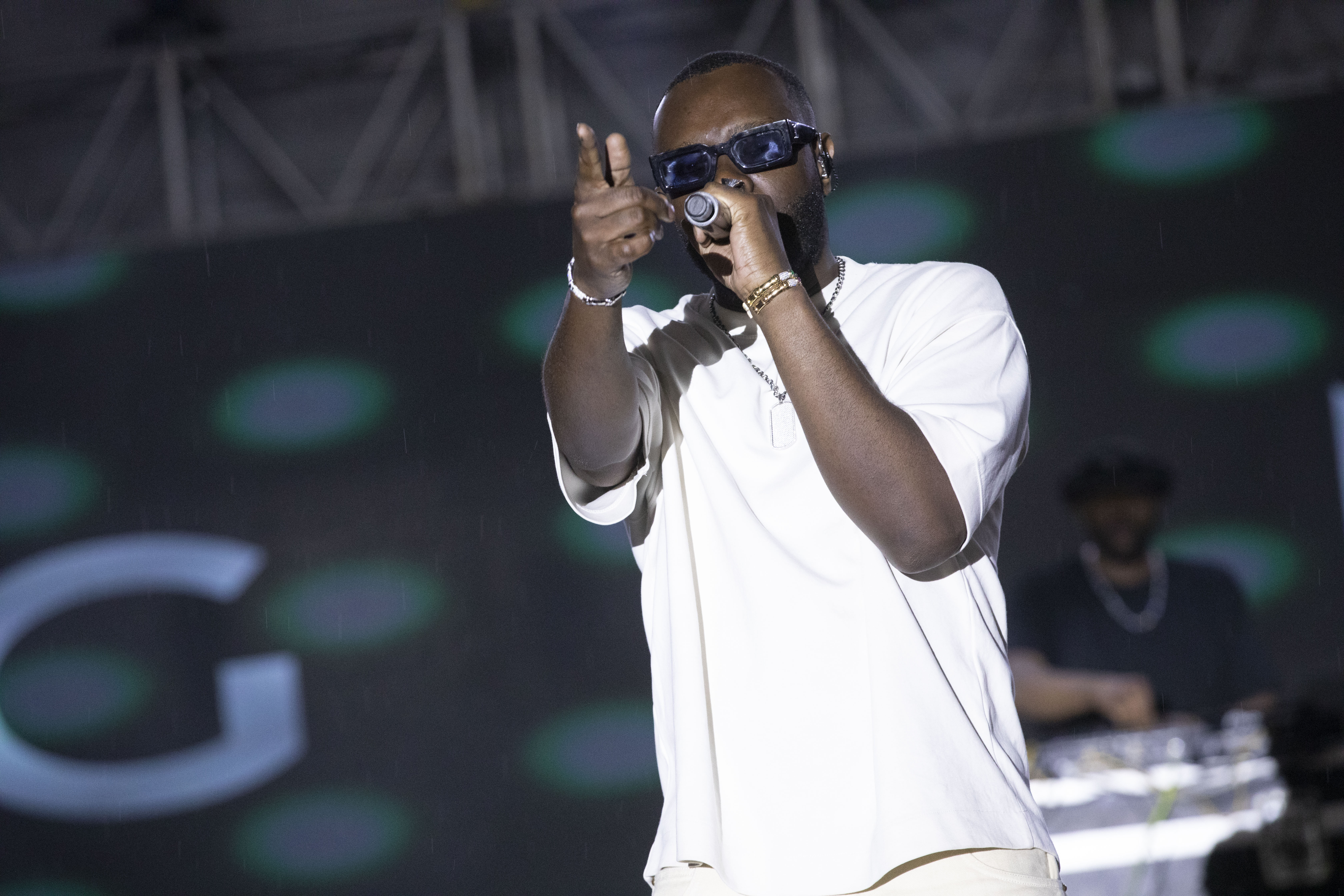
Gims at the 16th Anoumabo Urban Music Festival in 2024.

On 28 September 2022, Gims unveiled a date on social networks, 09/30. On 30 September 2022, Gims released the single "Maintenant". On 10 November 2022, he unveils "Thémistocle" and announces the release of the clip the next day, 11 November at 1:00 p.m. On 14 November 2022, he unveiled part of the album's tracklist containing 14 titles and three collaborations with Carla Bruni, Soolking and Tayc. In reality, the album contains a total of 18 tracks but only 14 have been revealed so far.

On 25 November 2022, two titles are revealed "Après-vous madame" featuring Soolking and "Demain" with Carla Bruni. The album was released on 2 December 2022, containing 18 tracks and three features with Soolking, Carla Bruni and Tayc. On 2 May 2023, the title "Horizon" was released as a single and its music video was unveiled on 4 July 2023. On 13 April 2023, after a controversy about the pyramids of Egypt, he revealed the title "Hernan Cortes".

On 15 September 2023, he released the title "Si te llamo" in collaboration with Maluma, accompanied by its music video. On 6 October 2023, he unveiled "Seya" featuring Morad and SativaMusic. He subsequently reveals several tracks which, like these first two, are not part of the album.

== Track listing ==
Les dernières volontés de Mozart track listing
No.	Title	Writer(s)	Producer(s)	Length
1.	"Intro"	Gims	Gims; Renaud Rebillaud	1:24
2.	"Horizon"	Gims; Vitaa; Renaud Rebillaud	Gims; Renaud Rebillaud	3:12
3.	"Après-vous madame" (featuring Soolking)	Gims; H Magnum; Inso	Gims; Ángel Cabral; Maximum Beat	3:37
4.	"Mama"	Gims; H Magnum; Inso	Gims; Renaud Rebillaud	2:41
5.	"GPB"	Gims; HB	Gims; Boumidjal X	2:42
6.	"Cash Cache"	Gims	Gims; Ponko	3:32
7.	"Demain" (featuring Carla Bruni)	Gims; Vitaa; Renaud Rebillaud	Gims; Vitaa; Renaud Rebillaud	3:19
8.	"Thémistocle"	Gims	Gims; Maximum	3:57
9.	"Vagabond"	Gims; Vitaa	Gims; Renaud Rebillaud	3:11
10.	"Longer les murs"	Gims; Inso	Gims; Renaud Rebillaud	3:39
11.	"Sans arrêt"	Gims	Gims; Renaud Rebillaud	2:36
12.	"Maintenant"	Gims; Vitaa; Renaud Rebillaud	Gims; Renaud Rebillaud	3:55
13.	"Ambassadrice"	Gims	Gims; Renaud Rebillaud	3:04
14.	"Saint-Tropez"	Gims; Inso	Gims; Bugatti Beatz	2:47
15.	"Ma Cabeza"	Gims; Inso	Gims; Bugatti Beatz	2:59
16.	"Te amo" (featuring Tayc)	Gims; Inso	Gims; Maximum Beat; Haïlé	3:17
17.	"Comme si"	Gims; Vitaa; Renaud Rebillaud	Gims; Renaud Rebillaud	3:10
18.	"Blessé"	Gims; Inso; HB	Gims; Young Bouba; Tendry	3:03
Total length:				56:13

Bonus
No.	Title	Writer(s)	Producer(s)	Length
1.	"Hernan Cortes"	Gims	Young Bouba; Tendry	3:12
2.	"Si te llamo" (feat. Maluma)	Gims; Maluma; Renaud Rebillaud	Gims; Maluma; Renaud Rebillaud	3:27
3.	"Seya" (feat. Morad, SativaMusic)	Gims; Morad	Gims; Renaud Rebillaud	3:08
4.	"Loco" (feat. Lossa)	Gims	Gims; Young Bouba	2:41
5.	"Ma douce" (feat. Baby Gang)	Gims; Baby Gang	Gims; Young Bouba	3:36
6.	"Joe Pesci" (feat. Inso Le Véritable)	Gims; Inso Le Véritable	Gims; Boumidjal	3:20

== Charts ==
The album is certified gold with more than 50,000 copies sold in June 2023. In July 2024, the album reached 100,000 copies sold and was certified platinum. The album will have finally had its small success, although it has sold less than his previous projects.

=== Weekly charts ===
Weekly chart performance for Les dernières volontés de Mozart
Chart (2022)	Peak position
Belgian Albums (Ultratop Wallonia)	23
French Albums (SNEP)	4
Swiss Albums (Schweizer Hitparade)	47

=== Year-end charts ===
2022 year-end chart performance for Les dernières volontés de Mozart
Chart (2022)	Position
French Albums (SNEP)	159

2023 year-end chart performance for Les dernières volontés de Mozart
Chart (2023)	Position
French Albums (SNEP)	110

== Certifications ==
Region	Certification	Certified units/sales
France (SNEP)	Platinum	100,000^{‡}
^{‡} Sales+streaming figures based on certification alone.
