= La même =

Single by Maître Gims and Vianney

from the album Ceinture noire
- Released: 9 March 2018 (featuring Vianney); 23 August 2018 (featuring Álvaro Soler)
- Genre: Pop
- Length: 3:20
- Songwriters: Maître Gims; Vianney; Renaud Rebillaud
- Producer: Renaud Rebillaud

Álvaro Soler singles chronology
"La cintura" (2018)	"Lo mismo" (2018)

Alternative cover

Music video
- Maître GIMS - Lo Mismo ft. Alvaro Soler (Clip Officiel) on YouTube

Music video
- Maître GIMS - La Même ft. Vianney (Clip Officiel) on YouTube

"La même" is a song recorded by Congolese singer and rapper Maître Gims in collaboration with Vianney released in 2018. The song has peaked at number one on the French Singles Chart as well on the Belgian charts.

A version entitled "Lo mismo" was also recorded, with Alvaro Soler replacing Vianney on the track and singing his portions in Spanish instead of French.

== Charts ==
=== Weekly charts ===
Chart (2018)	Peak position
Belgium (Ultratop 50 Flanders)	26
Belgium (Ultratop 50 Wallonia)	1
France (SNEP)	1
Switzerland (Schweizer Hitparade)	24

=== Year-end charts ===
Chart (2018)	Position
Belgium (Ultratop Flanders)	71
Belgium (Ultratop Wallonia)	1
France (SNEP)	2
Switzerland (Schweizer Hitparade)	87

Chart (2019)	Position
France (SNEP)	129

== Certifications ==
Region	Certification	Certified units/sales
Belgium (BRMA)	2× Platinum	80,000^{‡}
France (SNEP)	Diamond	333,333^{‡}
^{‡} Sales+streaming figures based on certification alone.
