= Shin Sekaï =

French singing / rapping fusion duo

The Shin Sekaï
- Origin: France
- Genres: Hip hop
- Years active: 2012-2017
- Labels: Wati B
- Members: Dadju (vocals); Abou Tall (rap)

The Shin Sekaï is a French singing / rapping fusion duo made up of Dadju (vocals) and Abou Tall (rap). The band's name means "New World" in Japanese (新世界, pronounced [ɕin se̞ka̠i]), and was taken from a fictional territory in the popular manga series One Piece.

Shin Sekaï were signed to French independent label Wati B. They released two mixtapes in 2015 2013 and 2014 and an album Indéfini in 2016.

After break-up, Dadju released his solo album Gentleman 2.0, whereas Abou Tall is releasing his solo album DLDLVL. Dadju is the brother of rapper Maître Gims, member of the successful French rap group Sexion d'Assaut, a major act of Wati B.

== Discography ==
=== Albums ===
Year	Album	Peak positions		Certification
Year	Album	FR	BEL (Wa)	Certification
2016	Indéfini	8	18	

=== Mixtapes ===
Year	Album	Peak positions		Certification
Year	Album	FR	BEL (Wa)	Certification
2013	The Shin Sekaï Vol. I	11	—	
2014	Volume II	—	58	

=== Singles ===
Year	Single	Peak positions		Album
Year	Single	FR	BEL (Wa)	Album
2013	"Je reviendrai"	149	–	The Shin Sekaï Vol. I
2013	"Si j'étais"	170	–	The Shin Sekaï Vol. I
2014	"Rêver"	51	18* (Ultratip)	The Shin Sekaï Vol. II
2014	"Du berceau au linceul"	46	7* (Ultratip)	The Shin Sekaï Vol. II
2015	"Ma jolie"	66	–	
2016	"Aime moi demain" (featuring Gradur)	63	–	

*Did not appear in the official Belgian Ultratop 50 charts, but rather in the bubbling under Ultratip charts.

Featured in

Year	Single	Peak positions		Album
Year	Single	FR	BEL (Wa)	Album
2013	"Ça marche" (Maître Gims feat. Shin Sekaï)	38	28	
2013	"Loin des ennuis" (Maska feat. Shin Sekaï)	163	–	
2014	"Je ne dirai rien" (Black M feat. Shin Sekaï & Doumams)	11	8* (Ultratip)	Black M album Les yeux plus gros que le monde
2014	"Billet facile" (Shin Sekaï, Dry, Abou Debeing & Docteur Beriz)	153	–	Les chroniques du Wati Boss - Volume 2

*Did not appear in the official Belgian Ultratop 50 charts, but rather in the bubbling under Ultratip charts.
