= H Magnum =

French rapper of Ivorian origin

- Born: December 30, 1984 (age 41); Yopougon
- Occupations: Rapper; Singer

Guy-Hervé Imboua, better known by his stage name H Magnum, is an Ivorian rapper and singer signed to the LoudSchool Production record label.

== Biography ==
Guy-Hervé Imboua was born in Yopougon, Ivory Coast, and immigrated at the age of 9 years old to France and resided in the 20th arrondissement of Paris. He started rapping in various bands, notably Aconit, a collective of young rappers from Saint-Blaise region, and appeared in various compilations. He later joined the rap collective L'Injection Lyricale. Gaining fame, he opened for Akon on 11 April 2009 at Bercy and performed alongside IAM at Zénith de Paris on 27 June 2009.

In 2012 he released his own materials in the album Dream. He has also collaborated with many rappers including Kery James, Intouchables, Diam'S and Sexion d'Assaut.

== Discography ==
=== Albums ===
Year	Album	Peak positions
Year	Album	FR
2009	Rafales	–
2012	Dream	137
2013	Fin de dream (Avant Gotham City)	82
2016	Gotham City	16
2020	Obade	?
2021	Bansky	83

=== Singles ===
Year	Single	Peak positions	Album
Year	Single	FR	Album
2013	"Fin de dream" (feat. Maître Gims)	170	Fin de dream (Avant Gotham City)
2014	"Idem"	10	
2014	"Prohibé"	41	
2015	"Aucun mytho" (feat. Black M)	21	Gotham City
2016	"Pourquoi tu m'en veux?" (feat. Maître Gims)	89	Gotham City

Others / Videography

- 2012: "Qui vivra verra"
- 2013: "L'appât du gain"
- 2013: "Mi amor"

Featured in

Year	Single	Peak positions	Album
Year	Single	FR	Album
2013	"Freedom" (Maître Gims feat. H Magnum)	146	Subliminal
2013	"De Marseille à Paris" (Maître Gims feat. Bedjik - Dr. Beriz - H Magnum - Soprano)	58	Subliminal
2014	"Du Swagg" (DJ Kayz feat. H Magnum & Maître Gims)	45	
2018	"La nuit c'est fait pour dormir" (GIMS feat. H Magnum - Orelsan)	83	Ceinture noire
