= Hola Señorita =

2019 single by Gims featuring Maluma

Single by Maître Gims featuring Maluma

from the album Ceinture noire
- Released: 26 April 2019
- Genre: Pop latino, reggaeton
- Length: 3:26
- Label: Play Two, Sony
- Songwriter: Renaud Rebillaud
- Producer: Renaud Rebillaud

Gims singles chronology
"Miami Vice" (2019)	"Hola Señorita" (2019)	"Reste" (2019)

Maluma singles chronology
"11 PM" (2019)	"Hola Señorita" (2019)	"Instinto Natural" (2019)

Music video
- "Hola Señorita" on YouTube

"Hola Señorita" is a song by Congolese singer and rapper Maître Gims. It was released as a single from the reissue of his album "Ceinture noire", "Transcendance". The song is partly in Spanish and features vocals from Colombian singer Maluma. A music video for the song was released on 12 May 2019 featuring Leyna Zniber. The song peaked at number 15 in France.

== Music video ==
The song's accompanying music video was shot in Morocco and was released on 10 May 2019. The video garnered 26 million views after a week of its release. It received 435 million views as of July 2021.

== Charts ==
Chart performance for "Hola Señorita"
Chart (2019–2020)	Peak position
Belgium (Ultratip Bubbling Under Flanders)	24
Belgium (Ultratop 50 Wallonia)	5
France (SNEP)	15
Hungary (Single Top 40)	12
Portugal (AFP)	52
Romania (Airplay 100)	58
Spain (Promusicae)	23
Switzerland (Schweizer Hitparade)	12

== Certifications ==
Certifications for "Hola Señorita"
Region	Certification	Certified units/sales
Austria (IFPI Austria)	Gold	15,000^{‡}
Belgium (BRMA)	Gold	20,000^{‡}
Brazil (Pro-Música Brasil)	Gold	20,000^{‡}
Canada (Music Canada)	Gold	40,000^{‡}
France (SNEP)	Diamond	333,333^{‡}
Italy (FIMI)	Gold	50,000^{‡}
Poland (ZPAV)	Gold	10,000^{‡}
Spain (Promusicae)	Platinum	40,000^{‡}
Switzerland (IFPI Switzerland)	Platinum	20,000^{‡}
Streaming
Sweden (GLF)	Gold	4,000,000^{†}
^{‡} Sales+streaming figures based on certification alone.^{†} Streaming-only figures based on certification alone.
