= Le Nord se souvient =

EP by Gims
- Released: 13 September 2024; 13 December 2024 (L'Odyssée)
- Recorded: 2024–2025
- Genres: Rap; Variety; Pop; Beatboxing
- Length: 71:17
- Labels: TF1 Group; Play Two; Géante Rouge; Indifférence Prod
- Producers: Gims; Maximum Beats; Young Bouba; Narco Verra; Bugatti Beatz

Gims chronology
LDVM (2022)	Le Nord se souvient (2024)

Le Nord se souvient: L'Odyssée

Singles from Le Nord se souvient
- 1. "Spider" Released: 10 May 2024; 2. "Sois pas timide" Released: 19 July 2024; 3. "Terminal 2F" Released: 16 August 2024; 4. "Vent du Nord" Released: 6 September 2024; 5. "Ohma Tokita" Released: 27 September 2024; 6. "Ciel" Released: 18 October 2024; 7. "Ninao" Released: 21 February 2025; 8. "Baby" Released: 21 February 2025; 9. "Diana" Released: 5 Mars 2025; 10. "Touché" Released: 11 April 2025; 11. "Appelle ta copine" Released: 23 May 2025; 12. "Air Force Blanche" Released: 20 June 2025; 13. "Parisienne" Released: 1 August 2025; 14. "Tu me rends bête" Released: 15 August 2025

Le Nord se souvient (English: The North remembers) is the second extended play by Congolese-French singer and rapper Gims, which was released on 13 September 2024 on the TF1 Group and Play Two labels. It is certified triple platinum and has sold over 300,000 copies, being available only on streaming platforms. This project is a reference to the first episode of the second season of the series Game of Thrones. A reissue of the EP entitled L'Odyssée was released on 13 December 2024.

== History ==
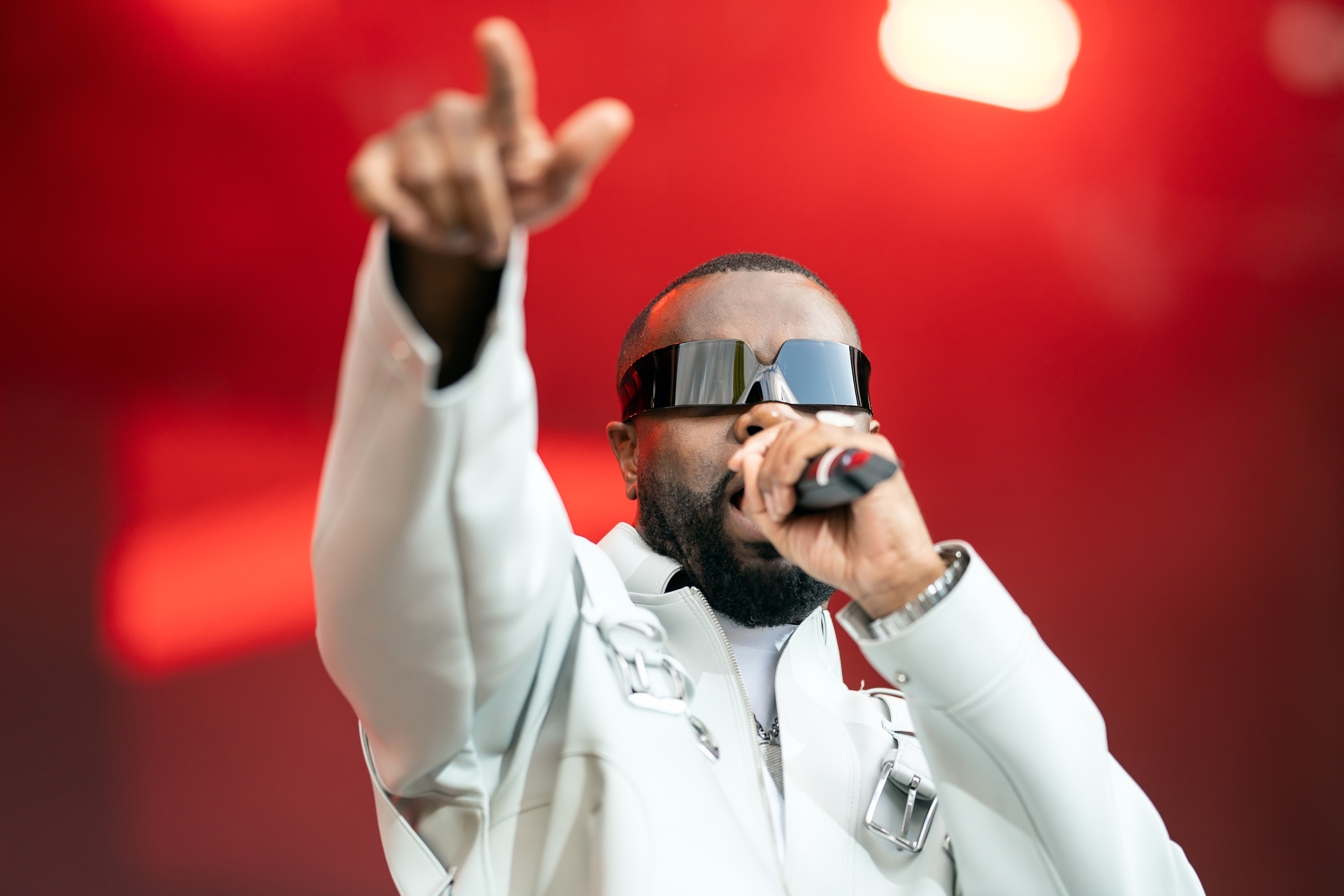
Gims at the La Nuit de l'Erdre in 2025.

In early 2024, Gims released several singles such as "Loco" featuring Lossa (certified platinum single), "Ma douce" with Baby Gang, "Sin Ti" with Maria Becerra and Joe Pesci in collaboration with Inso le Véritable not part of any album. In May 2024, he released "Spider" featuring Dystinct which ranked number 1 in France for 7 consecutive weeks and was certified diamond single.

Then, in July, two tracks "Mamacita" with Sfera Ebbasta and "Sois pas timide" were released which ranked number 1 for 3 weeks and was certified gold single. At the end of August, he released "Terminal 2F" featuring Dadju then at the beginning of September the track "Vent du Nord" was released. On 13 September 2024, his second EP Le Nord se souvient was released containing the tracks "Spider", "Sois pas timide", "Terminal 2F" and "Vent du Nord" as well as three new tracks "Carbo", "Avec tes mains" and "San Goku".

== Track listing ==
Le Nord se souvient
No.	Title	Writer(s)	Producer(s)	Length
1.	"Ciel"	Gims	Gims; Franguy; Insolent	3:06
2.	"Ohma Tokita"	Gims	Young Bouba	2:15
3.	"Vent du Nord"	Gims	Maximum Beats	2:25
4.	"Spider" (feat. Dystinct)	Gims; Dystinct	Gims; Maximum Beats; Young Bouba; Narco Verra	3:08
5.	"Sois pas timide"	Gims	Young Bouba	2:45
6.	"Terminal 2F" (feat. Dadju)	Gims; Dadju	Bugatti Beatz	3:07
7.	"Carbo"	Gims	Maximum Beats	2:09
8.	"Avec tes mains"	Gims	Maximum Beats	2:40
9.	"San Goku"	Gims	Young Bouba	2:52
Total length:				24:27

L'Odyssée
No.	Title	Writer(s)	Producer(s)	Length
1.	"Polizia"	Gims	Bugatti Beatz	2:48
2.	"Don Diego"	Gims	Bugatti Beatz	3:17
3.	"Prosecco" (feat. Vacra)	Gims; Vacra	Narco Verra	3:23
4.	"Cash flow"	Gims	Franguy; Maximum Beats	2:06
5.	"Diana"	Gims	Maximum Beats	2:19
6.	"Sans détour"	Gims	Young Bouba	2:40
7.	"Shaolin"	Gims	Nikooo Prod	2:04
8.	"Ninao"	Gims	Maximum Beats	2:47
9.	"Baby"	Gims	Maximum Beats	2:35
10.	"Touché" (feat. KeBlack)	Gims; KeBlack	Maximum Beats	2:53
11.	"Contact"	Gims	Maximum Beats	3:14
12.	"Appelle ta copine"	Gims	Maximum Beats	3:00
13.	"Comète"	Gims	Young Bouba	2:26
14.	"Air Force blanche" (feat. Jul)	Gims; Jul	Maximum Beats	3:06
15.	"Do You Love Me ?"	Gims; H Magnum	Bugatti Beatz; Young Bouba	2:49
16.	"Parisienne" (feat. La Mano 1.9)	Gims; La Mano 1.9; H Magnum	Maximum Beats	2:39
17.	"Tu me rends bête" (feat. Damso)	Gims; Damso	Maximum Beats	2:45
Total length:				46:50

== Charts ==
=== Weekly charts ===
Weekly chart performance for Le Nord se souvient
Chart (2024–2025)	Peak position
Belgian Albums (Ultratop Flanders)	25
Belgian Albums (Ultratop Wallonia)	1
French Albums (SNEP)	1
Portuguese Albums (AFP)	48
Swiss Albums (Schweizer Hitparade)	7

=== Year-end charts ===
Year-end chart performance for Le Nord se souvient
Chart (2025)	Position
Belgian Albums (Ultratop Flanders)	49
Belgian Albums (Ultratop Wallonia)	3
French Albums (SNEP)	1
Swiss Albums (Schweizer Hitparade)	8

== Certifications ==
Certifications for Le Nord se souvient
Region	Certification	Certified units/sales
France (SNEP)	Diamond	500,000^{‡}
^{‡} Sales+streaming figures based on certification alone.

== Release history ==
Country	Date	Label	Format
France	13 September 2024	TF1 Group; Play Two; Géante Rouge; Indifférence Prod	digital download
