= Sapés comme jamais =

Single by Maître Gims and Niska

from the album Mon cœur avait raison
- Released: 19 October 2015
- Genre: Afropop
- Length: 3:26
- Songwriters: Gandhi Djuna; Dany Synthé

Music video
- "Sapés comme jamais (Clip officiel) ft. Niska" on YouTube

"Sapés comme jamais" (English: Dressed like never) is a song by Congolese singer and rapper Maître Gims and Niska released in 2015.

== Charts ==
=== Weekly charts ===
Chart (2015)	Peak position
Belgium Urban (Ultratop Flanders)	20
Belgium (Ultratop 50 Wallonia)	2
France (SNEP)	3
Switzerland (Media Control Romandy)	11

=== Year-end charts ===
Chart (2015)	Position
France (SNEP)	35

Chart (2016)	Position
Belgium (Ultratop Wallonia)	47
France (SNEP)	22

== Certifications ==
Region	Certification	Certified units/sales
Belgium (BRMA)	Gold	10,000^{‡}
France (SNEP)	Diamond	333,333^{‡}
^{‡} Sales+streaming figures based on certification alone.

== Awards and nominations ==
Year	Award	Result	Ref
2016	Victoires de la Musique (Original Song of the Year)	Won	
2016	W9 d'or de la musique (Most streamed French song)	Won	
2016	W9 d'or de la musique (Most viewed French music video on the internet)	Won	
2016	NRJ Music Awards (Francophone Song of the Year)	Nominated	
