= Gims =

Congolese singer and rapper (born 1986)

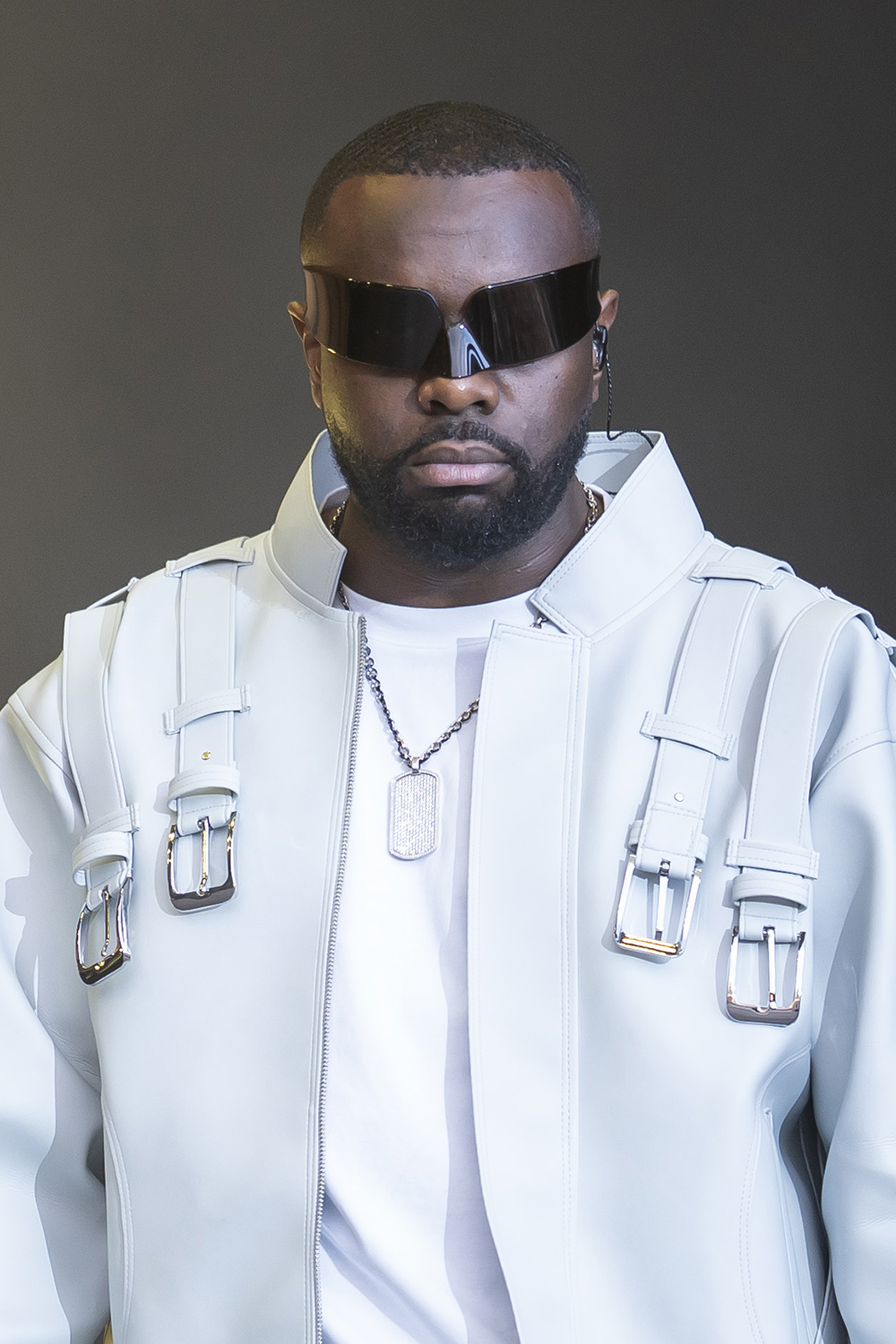
- Gims at the La Nuit de l'Erdre in 2025.
- Born: Gandhi Alimasi Djuna; 6 May 1986 (age 40); Kinshasa, DR Congo
- Other names: Meugi Warano; Le Fléau
- Citizenship: DR Congo
- Occupations: Singer; rapper; songwriter
- Years active: 2002–present
- Agent: Saïd Boussif
- Works: Discography; Filmography
- Title: Founder of Monstre Marin Corporation; Founder of Vortex Vx brand
- Relatives: Dadju (half-brother)
- Awards: Full list
- Musical career
- Origin: Kinshasa, DR Congo
- Genres: Pop rap; hip hop; afropop; pop; R&B; ndombolo; afrobeats
- Instrument: Vocals
- Labels: TF1 Group; Play Two; Géante Rouge; Indifférence Prod
- Website: gimstour.com
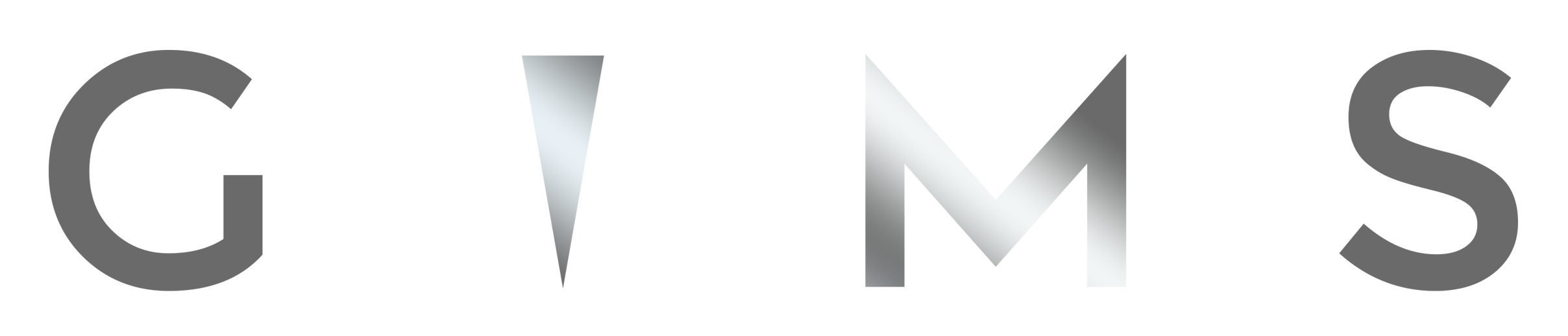

YouTube information
- Channel: Gims
- Years active: 2014
- Subscribers: 14.3M
- Views: 8.79 billion
- Last updated: 28 November 2025

Gandhi Alimasi Djuna (born 6 May 1986), known professionally as Maître Gims and, since around 2019, just Gims (stylized in all caps), is a Congolese singer and rapper. He grew up in France and currently lives in France and Morocco. Gims rose to fame as a member of the hip hop group Sexion d'Assaut and pursued an individual career under the name Maître Gims in 2013. In 2006, he released an extended play, titled Ceux qui dorment les yeux ouverts. During his career he has worked with several international artists such as Sia, Pitbull, Lil Wayne, Stromae, Maluma, Sting, and others. He has sold over 5 million records, including 3 million albums since the start of his career. He started his solo career in 2013 with the release of his first album, Subliminal in May on Wati B and Monstre Marin Corporation, which sold over a million copies and peaked at number two on the French album charts. In December he released a reissue titled Subliminal la face cachée. The album contained songs such as "J'me tire", "Bella" and "Zombie". From its first week of operation, the album certified platinum and would end up being double diamond disc for over 1 million in sales. The album was a great success, charting high in France, Belgium, and Switzerland.

In August 2015, Gims released his second album, Mon cœur avait raison. The album was divided into two parts: the red pill, which contains rap songs, and the blue pill, which contains pop-urban songs. The idea came from the movie The Matrix. A year later he released a re-release titled À contrecœur. The album contained some of the best songs in his career, such as: "Est-ce que tu m'aimes?", "Laissez passer", "Brisé", "Sapés comme jamais", "Tu vas me manquer", "Je te pardonne", "Ma beauté" and "Tout donner". The album was well received and after having sold nearly 85,800 records in its first week, it was certified platinum. At the end of 2018, more than 700,000 units had been sold in France and 581,000 units had been sold internationally. He released his third album in March 2018, titled Ceinture noire on the TF1 Group and Play Two labels. The album has been reissued several times: Transcendence reissue was released in April 2019 and an other reissue Décennie with 4 new titles was released in December 2019. The album entered top position in Wallonia and spent over seven weeks in first place. The album contained songs such as "Caméléon", "Miami Vice", "Hola Señorita", "Reste", "10/10" and "Mi Gna". His song "La même" was the most played in France in 2018 and it helped Gims become the most played artist of 2018 on French television and radio, as well as the seventh most performed artist in the world on Deezer.

In November 2020, In 2020, he won the International Artist of the Year in Distinctive International Arab Festivals Awards after his featuring in Mohamed Ramadan's song "Ya Habibi". During the COVID-19 pandemic confinement, Gims announced on an Instagram live that a 100% rap album would be released October 2020. According to some publications on his Instagram, Gims reveals that his album would be an 80% rap album contrary to what had been announced. On 4 December 2020, he released his fourth album titled Le fléau. On 17 September 2020, Netflix released a documentary about the last ten years of his career titled Gims: On the Record. A reissue entitled Les vestiges du fléau was published on 28 May 2021. A second reissue titled L'Empire de Méroé was released on 3 December 2021. The album contained songs such as "Yolo", "Immortel", "Jusqu'ici tout va bien", "Belle" and "Only You".

In December 2022, he released his fifth album, Les dernières volontés de Mozart or LDVM (Symphony). The album is certified gold with more than 50,000 copies sold in June 2023. In July 2024, the album reached 100,000 copies sold and was certified platinum. In August 2022, he played the song "Arhbo" for the 2022 FIFA World Cup Official Soundtrack along with Ozuna, which they also performed during the closing ceremony. He has topped the French singles chart five times, including once as a featured artist, most recently in 2024 with "Spider", featuring Dystinct. On 13 September 2024, Gims released a second EP and his first since 2006, titled Le Nord se souvient containing the tracks "Spider", "Sois pas timide", "Terminal 2F" and "Vent du Nord" as well as three new tracks.

== Early life ==
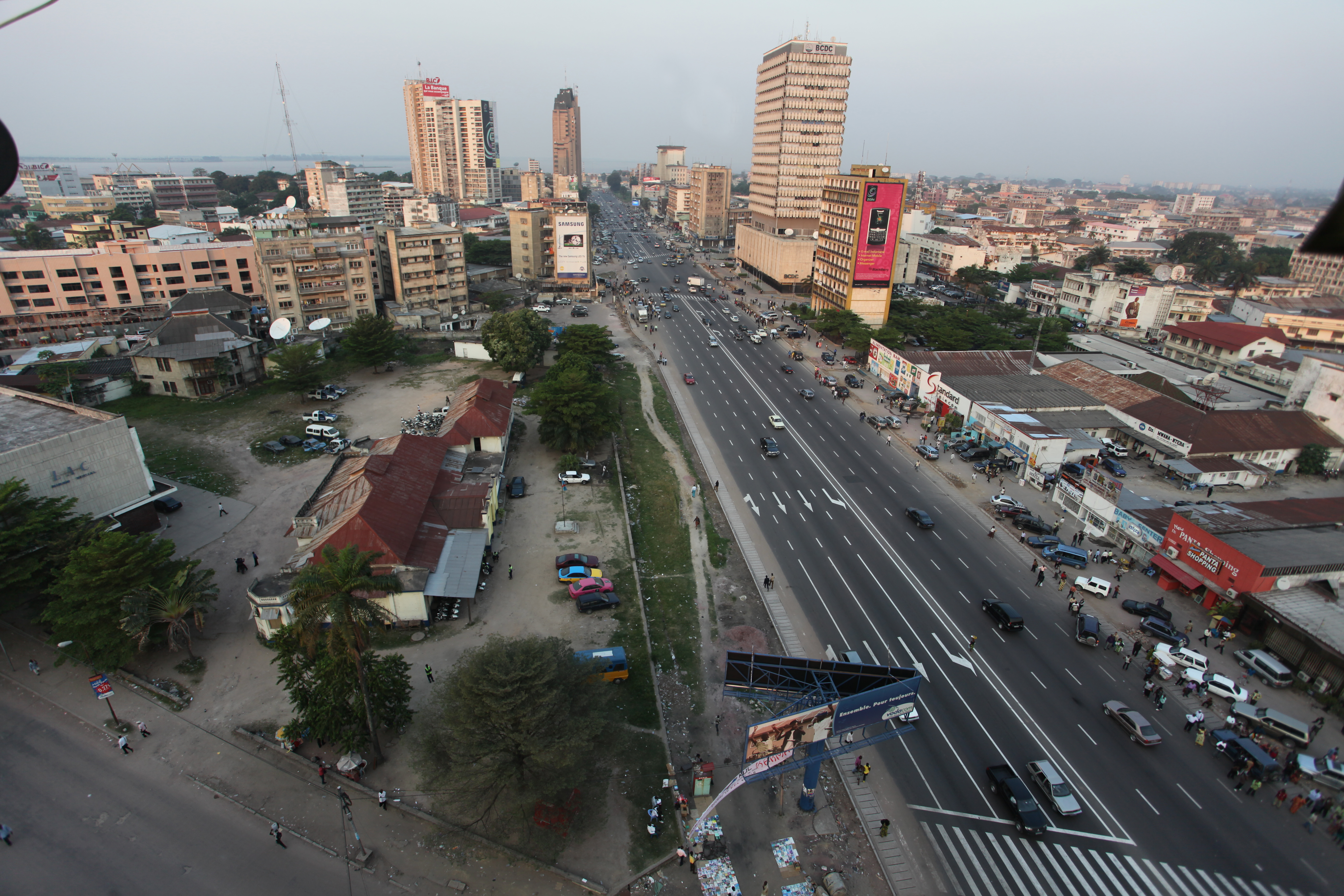
Kinshasa, DR Congo, birthplace of Gims.

Gandhi Djuna was born on 6 May 1986 in Kinshasa, Zaire (now the Democratic Republic of the Congo). He comes from a family of musicians: his father Djanana Djuna is the singer of Papa Wemba's Viva La Musica troupe. Due to political instability and lack of economic opportunity, his parents, who were undocumented immigrants, moved to France in 1988 when he was two years old.

Because of his parents' undocumented status, he had a difficult childhood. He was placed with foster families and lived in squats until he was 18 years old. This passage from his life is mentioned in his book Vise le soleil. He is part of a family of fourteen children. He is the brother of Dadju, member of the group The Shin Sekaï, of Bedjik, Afi (formerly Xgangs), and Djelass, all three of them rappers. On his first album Subliminal (2013), they participate in the song "Outsider". Gims grew up in the 3rd arrondissement of Paris. His family then moved to the 9th arrondissement and finally to the 19th arrondissement. Gims studied graphic design and communication. He took the nickname "Gims" in reference to Asian cinema and the world of martial arts.

== Career ==
=== 2002–2012: Sexion d'Assaut ===
In 2002, Gims joined with the rappers JR O Crom and Makan to form Prototype 3015. The name of the group was chosen in reference to a film, mainly for its "combative" meaning. The name Sexion d'Assaut also includes a reference to the Sturmabteilung (SA), in French "Section d'Assaut", a famous Nazi paramilitary unit, which the group learned of by chance during a concert for the City of Paris. In 2005, the trio merged with Assonance, another group from the Sexion d'Assaut collective. The group was then called 3rd Prototype. After a few pieces produced independently, Sexion d'Assault met their agent, Dawala, in the cellars of Châtelet-Les Halles in Paris. With Dawala, the 3rd Prototype released its first mixtape, La Terre du Milieu, on 13 May 2006. Gims designed the CD cover. In 2007, they released the album Le Renouveau, which contained the well-known piece "Anti Tectonick".

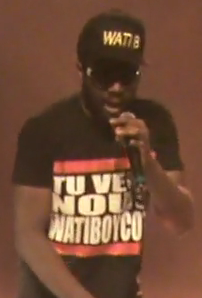
Gims in concert with Sexion d'Assaut at Cléon on 22 February 2010.

Through Prototype 3015 first, then Prototype 3, Gims was part of the Sexion d'Assaut supergroup. Sexion d'Assaut released their first songs between 2002 and 2003. Among them, were "Gang yaba Gang," "Coup 2 pression" and "Frères de rue." With Sexion d'Assault, Gims participated twice in the 12 Inch'All Star, a famous rap competition in the Parisian underground which takes place at the Batofar. He came in second place and gained notoriety, now known as one of the best kickers (freestylers) in France. In 2008, the group presented monthly freestyles called Les Chroniques du mois: each month, at least two freestyle songs were released via audio or video. In January 2009, Sexion d'Assaut published a net-tape renamed Les Chroniques du 75, a compilation also containing previously unreleased tracks, including the solo piece "À 30%" by Gims.

Sexion d'Assaut's second street album, L'Écrasement de tête, was released in May 2009 on label Because Music. The last sub-entity of the supergroup, 3rd Prototype, disappeared completely. L'Écrasement de tête acquired a certain notoriety with the general public thanks to titles and music videos, including "T'es bête ou quoi?" and "Wati Bon Son" (in collaboration with Dry). Sexion d'Assaut went on tour, notably opening for Orelsan and Medina. The album sold more than 50,000 copies. Following the release of LÉcrasement de tête, the group left Because Music due to misunderstandings and signed with Sony Music Entertainment.

In 2010, Sexion d'Assaut released the studio album L'École des points vitaux. Gims is credited there as a singer-songwriter. He composed the instrumental tracks of several pieces, including "Ils appellent ça 'Casquette à l'envers'". Other beatmakers also participated in the album, such as SoulChildren with "La drogue te donne des ailes". The album met with great success with the general public, selling over 400,000 copies. The group opened for Suprême NTM at the Parc des Princes and performed at the Zénith de Paris. In April 2011, a controversy broke out over the group's openly homophobic claims. In reaction to criticism, Sexion d'Assaut decided to release a mixtape entitled En attendant L'Apogée: les Chroniques du 75, which despite everything met with success with titles like "Paris va bien" and "Qui t'a dit". The project contains a DVD including a video of one of the songs, as well as a documentary retracing the group's journey.

In March 2012, they released their second album, L'Apogée, which was more successful than the first. The album sold over 700,000 copies. The same year, Gims published an online comic entitled Au cœur du vortex. In parallel with his career with Sexion d'Assaut, Gims tried his hand at musical composition. At the end of 2006, he released his first solo project, an Extended play entitled Ceux qui dorment les yeux ouverts. The EP is produced by ATK's Fredy K and Noko. With a very limited pressing, the disc aimed to make Gims known to the general public. The record features tracks with Sexion d'Assaut, Scred Connexion rapper Koma and a singer named Carole.

=== 2012–2015: Subliminal ===
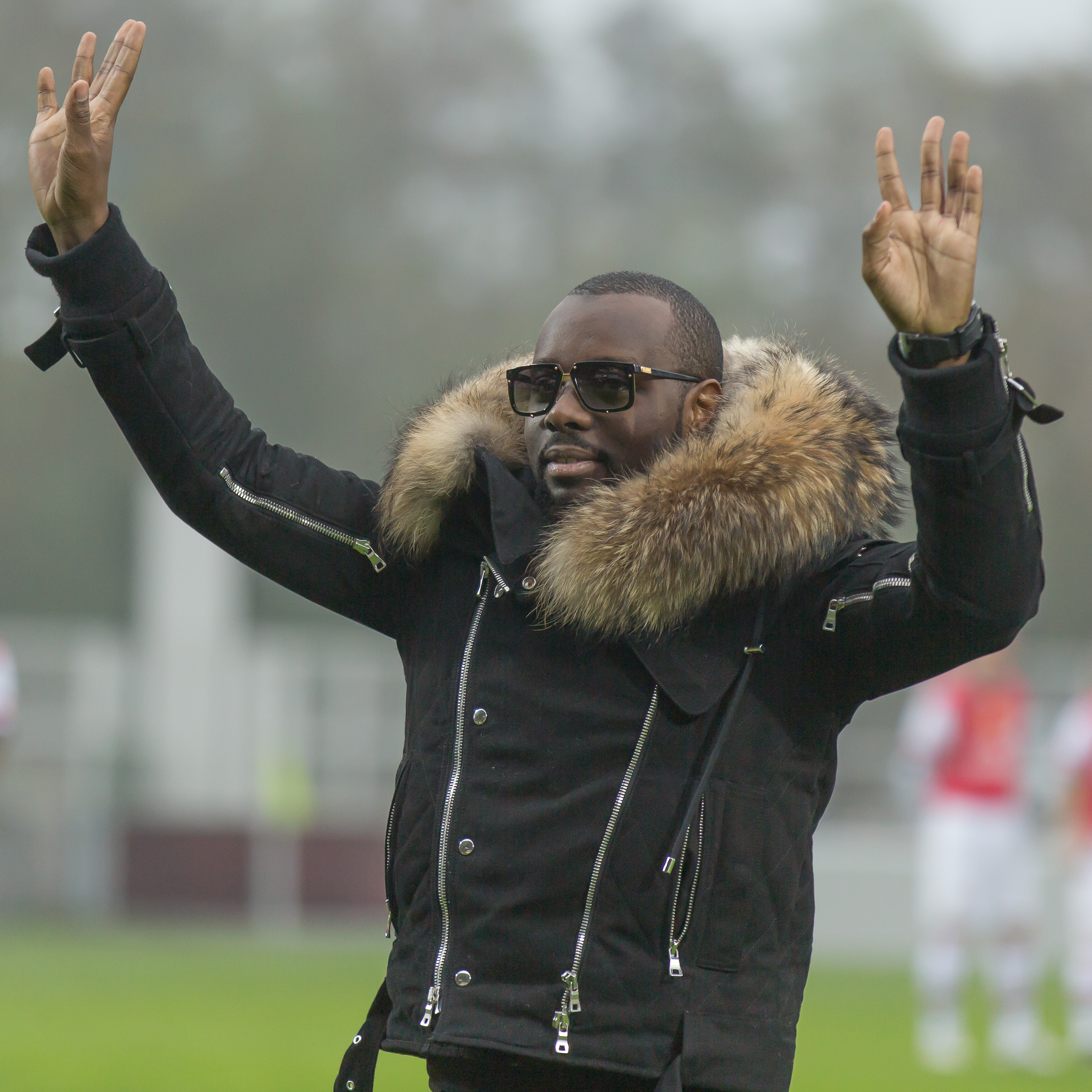
Gims in 2013, wearing his sunglasses which allow him to remain anonymous in the street when he takes them off

On 29 January 2013, in the video Welcome to the Wa Part. 4: La Consecration, Gims announced the release of his first solo studio album, Subliminal, for 20 May 2013. On 1 March Gims published "Meurtre par strangulation". On 15 March he unveiled "J'me tire", his second single which remained at number 1 on the French charts for four consecutive weeks, the music video being released on 10 April 2013. In an interview on the Rapelite.com site, Gims confirmed the presence of rapper Pitbull on a track entitled "Pas touché". His three brothers, Bedjik, Dadju and X-Gang, from the group MM Solja, reunited on the track "Outsider".

On May 4, he published "Bella". On 13 May "VQ2PQ" was broadcast exclusively on Skyrock. The song "It Works," was aired on May 14, similarly exclusively, in collaboration with The Shin Sekaï. The album Subliminal was released on 20 May. To promote it, Gims unveiled previously unreleased tracks, not part of the album, in the form of a series of music videos (clips in French) entitled This is not a clip. On the commercial side, the album was certified double diamond disc with more than 1 million sales.

On 31 May 2013, he performed his first solo concert at the Olympia. He featured on the album Racine carrée of Stromae on the song "AVF" featuring with Orelsan. After the last date of the Sexion d'Assaut tour, 28 September 2013 at the Stade de France for Urban Peace, which also brought together IAM, Orelsan, Youssoupha, La Fouine, Psy 4 de la Rime, Rohff and Stromae, Gims announced that he wanted to take a break. He also intended to take care of his marriage and his children, whom he says he has seen too little because of his career. The new Sexion d'Assaut album was scheduled for November 2015.

In September 2013, he collaborated with singer Vitaa on the single "Game Over". The song topped the singles charts in France. On 22 November 2013, Gims unveiled his new clip "Changer", which ranked 17th for the week of 1 December 2013. With this ballad, Gims hoped to reach a new, wider audience. In February 2014, Gims was nominated in the Urban Music category at the Victoires de la Musique, but the prize went to the rap group 1995. His solo career was nonetheless a success. According to the magazine Challenges, the singer was the second highest paid French artist of 2013, behind Mylène Farmer but just ahead of Johnny Hallyday.

=== 2015–2016: Mon cœur avait raison ===
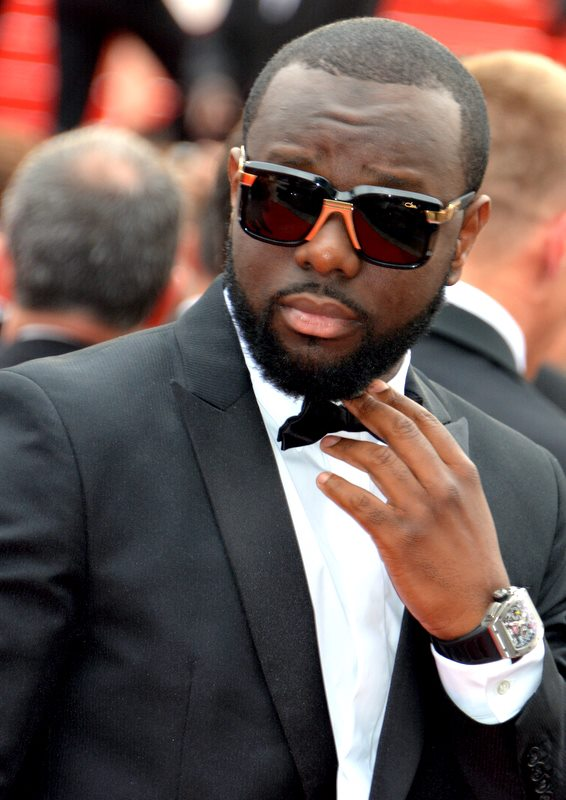
Gims at the 2016 Cannes Film Festival

In parallel with the announcement of his Warano Tour, Gims published videos via social networks with extracts of songs that turned out to be those of his future album. In addition, he announced the release on 20 February 2016 of the seventh video of This is not a clip with Fuck Ramses which could not take place. Although announced for the month of March, the release of the album's first single, "Est-ce que tu m'aimes?" took place on 28 April on Skyrock. He also used the occasion to announce that the album will be divided into two parts: the Blue Pill, which was made up of urban pop songs, and the Red Pill, which is oriented towards rap. This concept was inspired by the movie The Matrix. "Est-ce que tu m'aimes?" was part of the Blue Pill; the first single from The Red Pill, "Melynda Gates," was released later.

Then, Gims unveiled the second extract of the Blue Pill called "Laissez passer", the music video of which united his family, his father and his brothers. At the end of July, Gims continued with "Longue vie" (Red Pill) with Lefa which marked his return to the music scene, and the music video included all the members of Sexion d'Assaut. The tracklist and the release date of the album were announced by Gims on social media: the album will be released on 28 August. At the end of August, a new single: "Brisé", is available. Subsequently, he released 4 other singles from his double album ("Tu vas me manquer", "Je te pardonne", "ABCD" as well as "Sapés comme jamais"). Then he announced the reissue of his album which will be released on 26 August 2016. Mon cœur avait raison runs out to 700,000 copies.

On 23 April 2016, Gims gave a concert before the football match between Paris Saint-Germain F.C. and Lille OSC for the 2016 Coupe de la Ligue final. He performed excerpts from three of his hits "Est-ce que tu m'aimes?", "Bella" and "Sapés comme jamais". Unfortunately, applause was overtaken by booing and hissing by the spectators upon his arrival on the pitch. When the rapper shouted to the audience "Shall we continue?", the spectators shouted "No!" Interviewed about the incident later on, Gims revealed that he did not hear the whistles when he sang but that this negative response did not shock him. He pointed out that many of the football fans were already drunk, and some of them were for Lille, while Gims is Parisian. He even has a lyric in "Sapés comme jamais" about how "Paris is magic." The rapper acknowledged that there are a lot of people who do not like his music but said he would still do it all again, for his fans.

=== 2016–2019: Ceinture noire ===
Gims announced his third solo album, Ceinture noire, on 9 November 2016. Having left the Wati B label in December 2016, the album was released on TF1 Group under the Play Two label. On 7 May 2017, shortly after his official announcement, Gims published an extract on Instagram entitled "Marabout". The title accompanied by a video was officially released on Gims' new YouTube channel on 12 May 2017. On 10 November 2017, Gims broadcast the first official clip of Ceinture noire, titled "Caméléon," on streaming platforms. On 12 December he posted the music video on his YouTube channel. Within 2 weeks, the video received 10 million views. Ceinture noire the full album was released on 23 March 2018, with 31 tracks and 3 bonus tracks. Gims subsequently reissued the album with 4 bonus tracks in August 2018, then again in March 2019 with 13 bonus tracks. This last reissue was titled Transcendance and featured performances by South American superstar Maluma and J Balvin as well as Vitaa, Gims' brother Dadju, Alonzo and Sting. The duet with Sting was called "Reste", and the video for it was shot in the metro system of Lyon, the TCL or Transports en commun lyonnais.

Ceinture noire is currently certified by the SNEP as a double diamond disc with over 1,000,000 sales. On 28 September 2019, Gims officially became the first French-speaking rapper to fill the Stade de France with more than 72,000 spectators.

=== 2020–2021: Le fléau and Gims: On the Record ===
In 2020, Gims announced his plan to release an entirely rap album. Le fléau was released on 6 November 2020. On 27 March 2020, during a live Instagram with Dadju, Gims announced the album Le Retour des Rois for release that year. "Here we are in the negotiations, of who, or, the album will be released, with whom it will be distributed. You know, the things a little technical." On 30 March 2020 in this recording, Gims listened to several songs from the Sexion d'Assaut album Le Retour des Rois while driving in his car. On 2 May 2020, during a live return to Instagram with Sniper, Sefyu and Gradur, Gims formalized his 100% rap album for the start of the 2020 school year at the latest, and Le Retour des Rois for the end of 2020, or even the beginning of 2021. After the end of the first confinement on 11 May 2020, Gims announces the return of the Sexion d'Assaut with the new album Le Retour des Rois, scheduled for the fall.

The Sexion d'Assaut made its comeback in concert at Paris La Défense Arena on 25 September 2021, a date officially set for January but postponed due to the raging COVID-19 pandemic. On 28 August 2020, Kendji Girac and Gims unveiled their title "Dernier Métro", produced as a duo. The same day, he released the first single, "Yolo", from his upcoming album Le fléau. On 17 September 2020, on Netflix, a documentary was released retracing the last ten years of his career titled Gims: On the Record. On 25 September 2020, he released the second single from Le Fléau, entitled "Immortel", a purely rap song reminiscent of Gims's early freestyles with Sexion d'Assault.On 2 December 2020, Gims unveiled the tracklist of Le Fléau with 17 tracks, including features from Vald, Kaaris, Heuss l'Enfoiré, Leto, Bosh and Gazo. The album was certified platinum a month and a half after its release. On 17 March 2021, Gims published a new freestyle named "Pyongyang" in collaboration with l'nsolent. On 5 April 2021, he published on streaming platforms a new track called "GJS" in collaboration with Jul and SCH, as well as the track "Belle", in collaboration with Dadju and Slimane. He appeared in a video supporting right-wing candidate Valérie Pecresse in the run-up to the 2021 regional elections in Île-de-France.

On 28 April 2021, Gims announced the reissue of the album entitled Les Vestiges du Fléau which will be released on 28 May 2021. On 19 May 2021, he published the list of titles composed of 10 tracks including 8 collaborations and two solos . Among the guests of the reissue, in addition to Jul, SCH, Dadju and Slimane, participate, in particular, international singers such as the Egyptian Mohamed Ramadan, the Tanzanian Rayvanny as well as the German-Albanian singer Dhurata Dora. On 28 May 2021, the same day as the release of the reissue, Gims released the clip for "Only You" in collaboration with Dhurata Dora. On 8 October 2021, he released a new single in collaboration with Vitaa named "Prends ma main". In November 2021, he participated in the collective project Le Classico organisé, on Jul's initiative, bringing together more than 150 rappers from Bouches-du-Rhône and Île-de-France.

=== 2022–2024: Les dernières volontés de Mozart ===
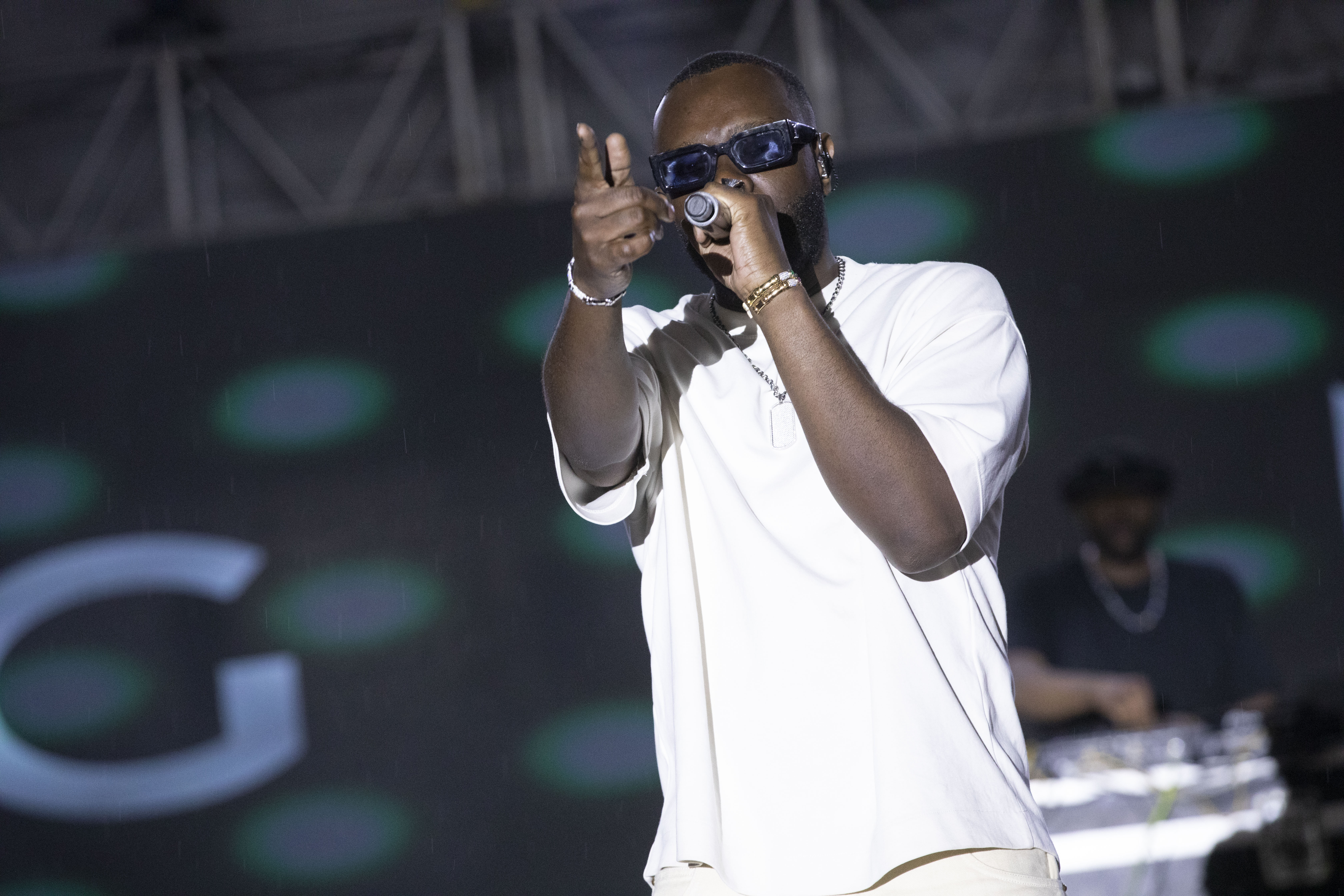
Gims at the 16th Anoumabo Urban Music Festival in 2024.

On 28 September 2022, Gims unveiled a date on social networks, 09/30. On 30 September 2022, Gims released the single "Maintenant". On 5 October 2022, Gims revealed the album's title, its release date and its cover. On 10 November 2022, he unveiled "Thémistocle" and announced the release of the music video the next day. On 14 November 2022, he unveiled part of the album's tracklist containing 14 titles and three collaborations with Carla Bruni, Soolking and Tayc. In reality, the album contains a total of 18 tracks but only 14 have been revealed so far. On 25 November 2022, two titles are revealed "Après-vous madame" featuring Soolking and "Demain" with Carla Bruni. The album was released on 2 December 2022, containing 18 tracks and three features with Soolking, Carla Bruni and Tayc. On 2 May 2023, the title "Horizon" was released as a single and its music video was unveiled on 4 July 2023. On 13 April 2023, after a controversy about the pyramids of Egypt, he revealed the title "Hernan Cortes". On 15 September 2023, he released the title "Si te llamo" in collaboration with Maluma, accompanied by its music video. On 6 October 2023, he unveiled "Seya" featuring Morad and SativaMusic. He subsequently revealed several tracks which, like these first two, were not part of the album.

=== 2024–present: Le Nord se souvient ===
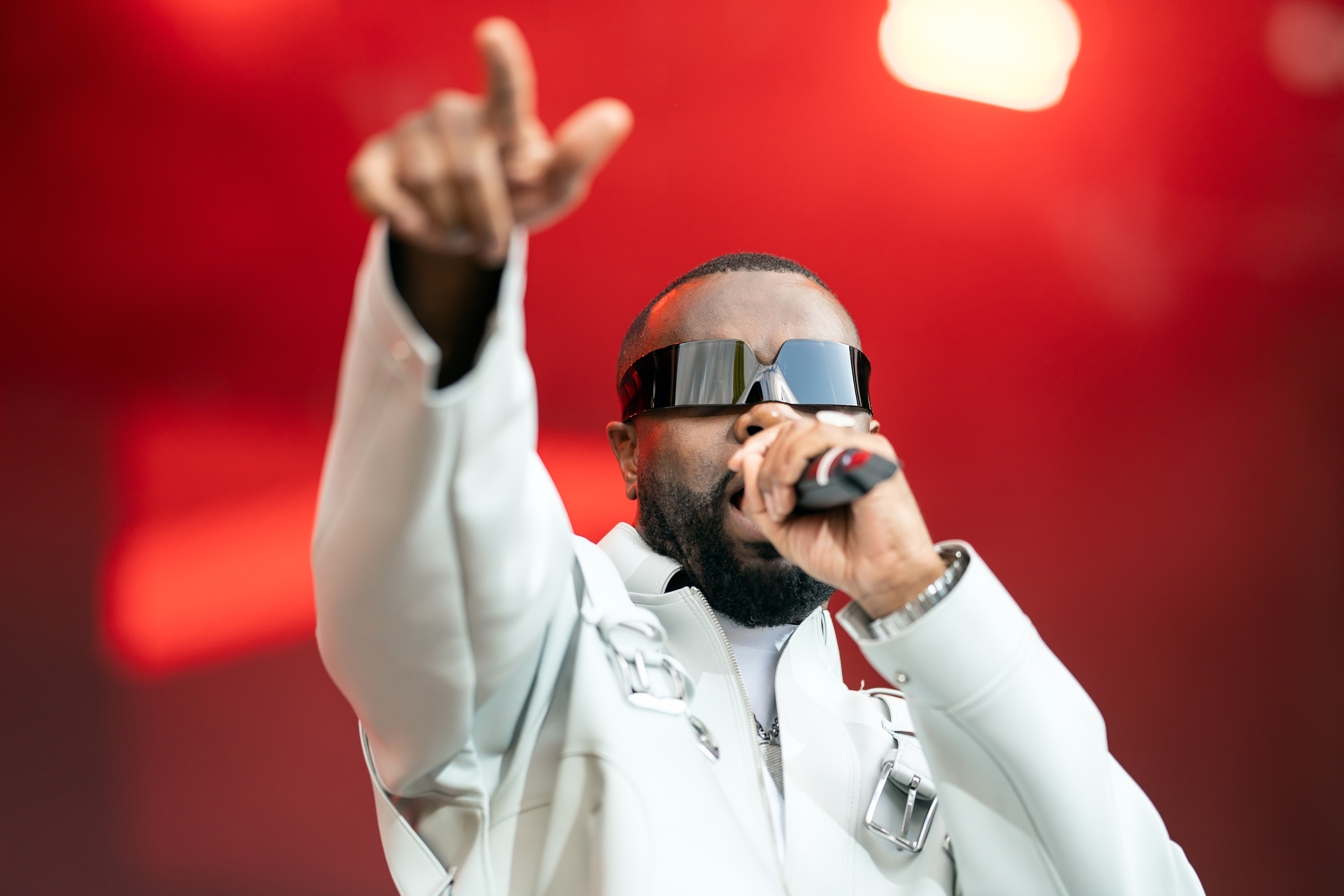
Gims at the La Nuit de l'Erdre in 2025.

In early 2024, Gims released several singles such as "Loco" featuring Lossa (certified platinum single), "Ma douce" with Baby Gang, "Sin Ti" with Maria Becerra and Joe Pesci in collaboration with Inso le Véritable not part of any album. In May 2024, he released "Spider" featuring Dystinct which ranked number 1 in France for 7 consecutive weeks and was certified diamond single. Then, in July, two tracks "Mamacita" with Sfera Ebbasta and "Sois pas timide" were released which ranked number 1 for 3 weeks and was certified gold single. At the end of August, he released "Terminal 2F" featuring Dadju then at the beginning of September the track "Vent du Nord" was released. On 13 September 2024, his second EP Le Nord se souvient was released containing the tracks "Spider", "Sois pas timide", "Terminal 2F" and "Vent du Nord" as well as 3 new tracks "Carbo", "Avec tes mains" et "San Goku". In February 2025, after receiving the Male Artist Award at the Victoires de la Musique, he suggested he wanted to end his tours.

On 22 April, Gims, in collaboration with co-headliners Youssoupha and Fally Ipupa, spearheaded a philanthropic, sold-out concert titled Solidarité Congo at the Accor Arena. The event, which featured thirty prominent musical acts—including leading figures from the French rap scene as well as internationally acclaimed and Congolese artists—was organized to raise funds for child victims affected by the Rwandan-backed M23 insurgency in the eastern Democratic Republic of the Congo. The proceeds were allocated to Dadju's Give Back Charity. Initially scheduled for 7 April, the concert was postponed in observance of the International Day of Remembrance of the 1994 Rwandan genocide. In 2024, Gims became an ambassador for 1xbet in Congo.

Gims will be at the Festival Fono, at the Campus of University Laval in the province of Québec, the 10th of September 2026.

== Personal life ==
Gandhi Djuna is extremely private about his personal life. Most sources report that he has 6 children: two from his first relationship with a French-Moroccan woman, and four from his 20-year marriage with Demdem (original name Adja-Damba Dante), a French woman of Malian origin. They met in 2004 and were married in a private ceremony in 2005.. Gims frequently laments that he is unable to spend more time with his children. In keeping with Gims' determination to protect his children's privacy, most of their names are not known widely, and they are almost never photographed. However, he has featured DemDem in the music videos for "Caméléon" and "Tout Donner." In 2025, Gims and Demdem divorced.

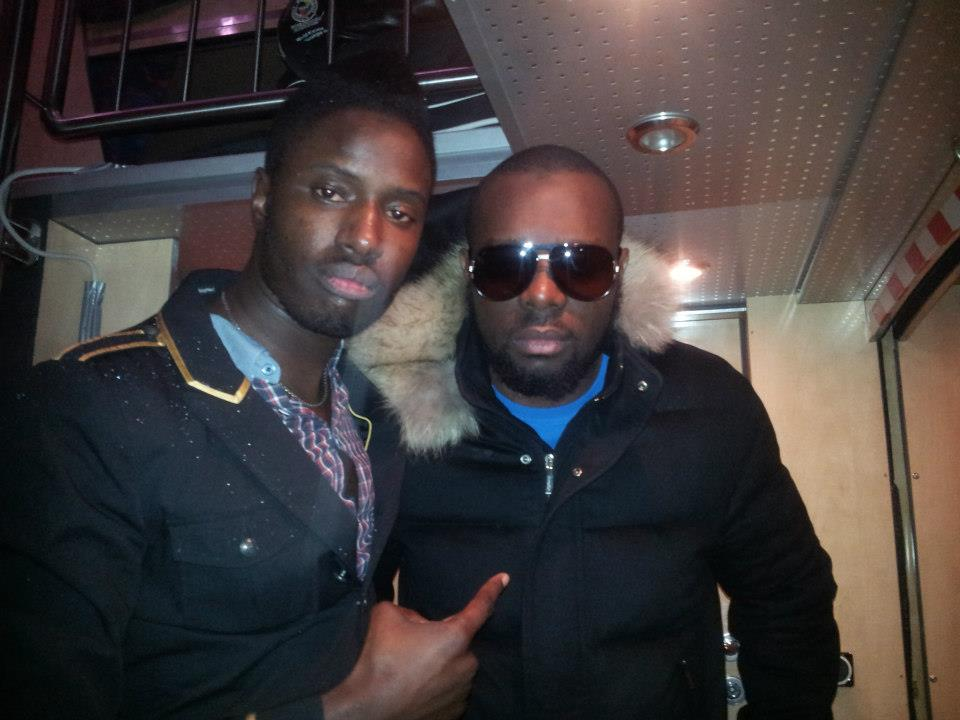
Gims with a fan in October 2013

In March 2018, he indicated that he had applied for French nationality and that it was refused. According to Closer magazine, this decision is because of his “bigamy”, which is not authorized in French or European law. However, Maître Gims disputes this version of the facts. In an interview with Le Journal du Dimanche, in 2022, to the question: “We lend you a second wife in Morocco. Are you polygamous?", he replied: "That's completely false. I live with Demdem and the children. I was married only once." He specified that "the refusal [of the nationality application] is linked to an offense that I committed when I was a minor. But my record is clean.”

According to an investigation by the newspaper Le Parisien, his first application for nationality was blocked for failure to pay fines for traffic offenses, as well as to his inability to establish the center of his material interests in France; the performer and his family spent too much time in Morocco and not enough in France to be considered French. In early 2022, he relaunched the procedure for obtaining French nationality. The Minister of the Interior, Gérald Darmanin, estimated on 25 January 2022 on France Inter that the rapper's recent social media video complaining about being wished a happy New Year, which he said was not to be celebrated by Muslims, did not demonstrate "good proof of assimilation into French society", going against article 21-24 of the Napoleonic Code. However, the minister assured that his request would be, like all the others, re-examined by his services. He has a Congolese diplomatic passport obtained in 2022.

Gims converted to Islam in 2004. Originally a Catholic, he said in 2016 that conversations with Barack Adama, his friend from the group Sexion d'Assaut, convinced him to convert to Islam, as well as an interview with an imam. In 2005, he joined the revivalist movement of the Tablighi Jamaat, which he then left and now considers a cult. He says in a documentary dedicated to him on Netflix: "There were people who ended up dead, committed suicide in Iraq. People who were close to me, and that freaked me out. I don't know where I could have ended up." Gims also is an anime enjoyer; multiple anime references can be found in his music. One example is in his hit song "SPIDER," where it references Demon Slayer and One Piece—two very popular anime.

=== Monstre Marin Corporation ===
In 2013, Gims founded Monstre Marin Corporation with Pascal Nègre. The latter announced the direct integration of MMC into Universal. "Gims is one of the most gifted artists of his generation! I am delighted to accompany him with Universal Music in his discovery of new talents and in the development of his label Sea Monster", he explained on his Twitter page. The label's logo was unveiled in early 2014. In February 2014, L'Algérino joined the label, followed in June 2014 by Mac Tyer. Monstre Marin Corporation published its first compilation La Monster Party chapitre 1 on 30 June 2014. According to BFM TV, Gims sold 50% of the label Monstre Marin Corporation in 2014 for 500,000 euros. This structure sold to Universal Music France brought together many artists such as Vitaa, Souf, Mac Tyer, L'Algérino, MA2X, Lartiste or even the Marin Monster duo, now all gone and replaced by emerging artists like DJ Arafat, DJ Last One, Amalya or Savana blues. The label ended its activities on 13 January 2020.

=== Gims and his sunglasses ===
Gims is famous for always wearing sunglasses in public; in fact, it is rare to find pictures of him without glasses on the Internet. The reason for this is so that he is not recognized on the street when he is without glasses because of his wide popularity in France and Paris in particular, and he has stated that this method works. The only time Gims took off his glasses in public was at a live concert with the group Sexion d'Assaut when he danced with the group members but little was noticed on his face because the stage was almost dark.

== Artistic environment ==
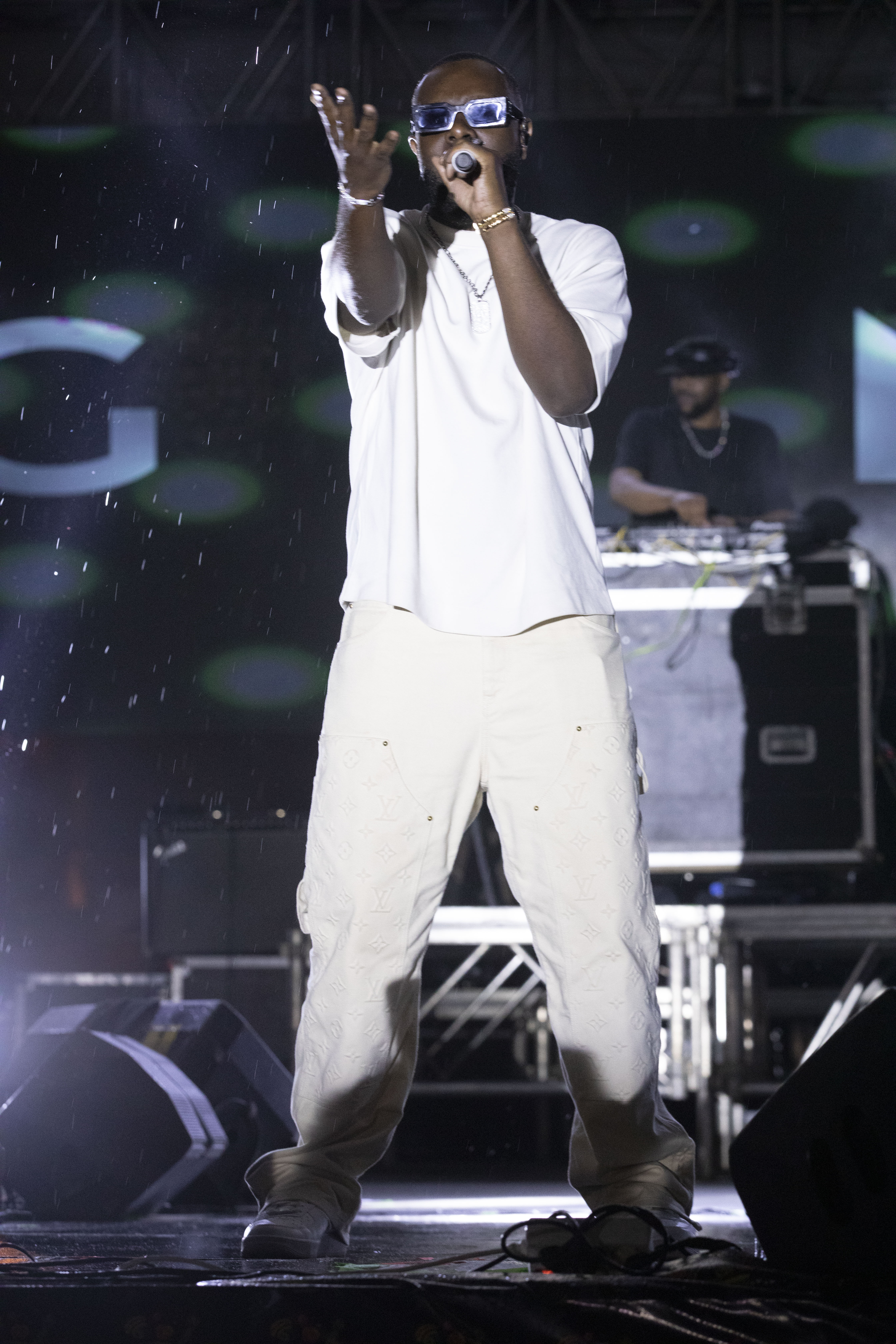
Gims at the 16th Anoumabo Urban Music Festival in 2024.

Gims's music is influenced by hip-hop and dance, with pop and Latin touches. Just before his first album, Les Inrocks compared Gims to footballer Lionel Messi for his versatility: "Gims has a vast arsenal. He sings, raps, composes and produces."

The second album is divided into two parts: an "urban pop / R&B" oriented, widely broadcast by radio and music channels, and a "rap" oriented as it did when it started. The humorist of the web Jhon Rachid deplores that the second part "old-fashioned rap" is less known than the first, which hurts him "rap" (title of his show on YouTube). As for Joeystarr, he often criticizes him on social networks, calling his music "music for prepubescents". The slammer Grand Corps Malade said in an interview that he does not adhere to the music of Gims, which is "teenage pop" with "poor lyrics and an unpleasant voice".

The Booska-P site evokes "Gims-bashing" in an article presenting the most hated French rappers which also include Bigflo & Oli, Jul and Booba. Rap "purists" like Joeystarr or Jhon Rachid cited above reproach him for the touches of pop and dance; some calling his music "camping music" or "zumba". Hated by a part of the rap fans, he is also hated by a part of the general public who do not like rap and prefer variety or rock. Literary critic Éric Naulleau has called Gims's "Bella" "the worst text he's ever heard".

== Controversies ==
In April 2017, it was said that he cancelled a concert in Alès due to the lack of a private jet to take him there, as the organizer did not have the means to pay for it. The headlines criticised it as a "star whim". Following the media coverage, he gave a free and improvised concert in the Paris metro. In the program Touche pas à mon poste!, Gims explained that the concert was initially only a proposal which was ultimately not accepted. However, the promoter had already started selling the tickets. Faced with the risk of financial loss, the promoter contacted the rapper's producer offering to fly Gims to the concert by private jet, but Gims could not attend due to a scheduling conflict with another concert.

=== Plagiarism ===
Gims and Vianney were accused of plagiarism by the Belgian director Charlotte Abramow for the clip "La même". Abramow had directed a video for the International Women's Day of 7 February 2004, with which "La même", according to her, had many similarities: "[the video for La même has] the same structure, the same esthetics, the same decorations in pastel colors and especially the same types of portraits". Maitre Gims responded by accusing Charlotte Abramow of having herself violated copyright by using a clip from the music video for the song "Silent All These Years" by Tori Amos.

=== Christmas ===
At the end of 2021, he stated in a video that celebrating Christmas or wishing a happy new year "is not Muslim". He is also opposed to birthday celebrations because this tradition is of non-Muslim origin. He subsequently apologised for the video.

=== Homophobia ===
Among several homophobic lyrics with his band Sexion D'Assaut, in 2008, in the song "On t'as humilié" which uses the instrumental from the single "Soldier" by American rapper Eminem, Gims pronounces the sentence "I think it's time for the faggots to perish, cut off their penises and leave them dead on the ring road."

=== Arrest ===
On 25 March 2026, Gims was arrested and detained for alleged involvement in a complex international money laundering network at the Paris-Charles de Gaulle airport. Investigators are examining a luxury real estate development project, "Sunset Village Private Residences," promoted by Gims in Marrakech. After 48 hours of detention, he was released on judicial supervision and asked to pay bail. On April 3rd, he released a song titled "Soleil" briefly addressing the issue.

== Diversification ==
At the beginning of 2013, Gims founded his own clothing brand, Vortex Vx, sold in particular at Veepee and Gémo. On 31 October 2018, the manga Devil's Relics was published, imagined by Gims with his brother Darcy, and co-signed by the two brothers with screenwriter Jean-David Morvan and designer Yoshiyasu Tamura.

=== Lyricist ===
In addition to writing his own lyrics, he also writes for other artists. In 2013, Gims participated as a "guest" in the Popstars program, in which he gave young groups advice for their career. Following this intervention, he wrote the first single of the winning group, The Mess, entitled Au Top. This single reached eighth on the iTunes chart.

== Discography ==
=== Solo ===
- Subliminal (2013)
- Mon cœur avait raison (2015)
- Ceinture noire (2018)
- Le fléau (2020)
- Les dernières volontés de Mozart (2022)
- Le Nord se souvient (2024)

=== With Sexion d'Assaut ===
- L'Écrasement de tête (2009)
- L'École des points vitaux (2010)
- En attendant L'Apogée: les Chroniques du 75 (2011)
- L'Apogée (2012)

== Filmography ==
Year	Film	Role	Notes
2020	Gims: On the Record	Himself	Documentary

== Concert tours ==
- Warano Tour (2015–2017)
- Fuego Tour (2018–2019)
- Décennie Tour (2022)
- LDVM Tour Pt. I (2023–2024)

== Awards and nominations ==
Year	Nominee / work	Award	Result	Ref
2013	Himself	NRJ Music Awards (Francophone Male Artist of the Year)	Nominated	
2013	Himself	MTV Europe Music Awards (Award for Best French Act)	Nominated	
2014	Himself	MTV Europe Music Awards (Award for Best French Act)	Nominated	
2014	Subliminal	Victoires de la Musique (Album Révélation of the Year)	Nominated	
2014	"J'me tire"	Victoires de la Musique (Original Song of the Year)	Nominated	
2014	Himself	Trace Awards (Francophone Male Artist of the Year)	Nominated	
2014	"Prie pour moi"	Trace Awards (Duo/Group of the Year)	Nominated	
2016	"Sapés comme jamais"	Victoires de la Musique (Original Song of the Year)	Won	
2016	"Sapés comme jamais"	W9 d'or de la musique (Most streamed French song)	Won	
2016	"Sapés comme jamais"	W9 d'or de la musique (Most viewed French music video on the internet)	Won	
2016	Himself	NRJ Music Awards (Francophone Male Artist of the Year)	Nominated	
2016	Himself	NRJ Music Awards (Francophone Duo/Group of the Year)	Nominated	
2016	"Sapés comme jamais"	NRJ Music Awards (Francophone Song of the Year)	Nominated	
2016	Himself	MTV Europe Music Awards (Award for Best French Act)	Nominated	
2018	Himself	NRJ Music Awards (Francophone Duo/Group of the Year)	Nominated	
2018	Himself	NRJ Music Awards (Francophone Duo/Group of the Year)	Nominated	
2018	Himself	NRJ Music Awards (Francophone Male Artist of the Year)	Nominated	
2018	"La même"	NRJ Music Awards (Francophone Song of the Year)	Nominated	
2019	Himself	NRJ Music Awards (Francophone Male Artist of the Year)	Nominated	
2020	Himself	NRJ Music Awards (Francophone Male Artist of the Year)	Nominated	
2020	"Reste"	NRJ Music Awards (Francophone Collaboration of the Year)	Nominated	
2020	Himself	NRJ Music Awards (Francophone Performance of the Night)	Nominated	
2020	Himself	NRJ Music Awards (NRJ Music Award of Honor)	Won	
2020	Himself	Distinctive International Arab Festivals Awards (International Artist of the Year)	Won	
2020	Himself	MTV Europe Music Awards (Award for Best French Act)	Nominated	
2021	Himself	NRJ Music Awards (Francophone Male Artist of the Year)	Nominated	
2021	Himself	NRJ Music Awards (Francophone Collaboration of the Year)	Nominated	
2023	Himself	Latin American Music Awards (Best Crossover Artist)	Nominated	
2023	"Arhbo"	Latin American Music Awards (Collaboration Crossover of the Year)	Nominated	
