= Armenian Music Awards =

American-Armenian music award

- Awarded for: Excellence and outstanding achievement
- Country: United States
- Presented by: Armenians in Music and Film Association
- First award: October 7, 1998; 28 years ago
- Website: armenianmusicaward.com

The Armenian Music Awards (AMAs) are an Armenian-American annual music awards ceremony that were first held at the Alex Theatre in Glendale, California on October 7, 1998. It was created and produced by Peter Bahlawanian who wanted to support Armenian artists.

The awards consist of several categories varying from 20 to 30 from year to year. Numerous artists perform live throughout the evening.

The nominees and winners are decided by a panel of judges who listen to CDs or MP3s prior to the night of events. There are, however, some categories that are voted by the general public. Votes are cast through online voting locations. SMS voting was also made available in 2007. The categories that are voted by public include Best Song of the Year, Best Duet Song of the Year, and Best Male & Female Artist of the Year.

The tenth annual Armenian Music Awards were held at the Nokia Theatre in Los Angeles, California on December 13, 2009.

October 2018 marked the 20th anniversary of the AMAs and to celebrate the event, they brought together various participants throughout the years for a TV reunion.

The most recent awards were held in the Dolby Theatre in Hollywood, California on December 8, 2024. It was attended by big names in the industry such as Nune Yesayan, André, Sofi Mkheyan, Christine Pepelyan, Armenchik, among others.

== Notable award winners ==
- Adiss Harmandian
- Alla Levonyan
- André
- Andy
- Anush Hovnanyan
- Ara Gevorgyan
- Aram Asatryan
- Araz Dare
- Armen Anassian
- Arminka
- The Beautified Project
- Charles Aznavour
- Cher
- Datevik
- Djivan Gasparyan
- Eileen Khatchadourian
- Elon Sarafyan
- Garo Sarafian
- Gary Kesayan
- George Baghdoyan
- Georgi Minasyan
- Gor Mkhitarian
- Harout Pamboukjian
- Hayko
- Jacob Armen
- Khatchatour Avedissian
- Loris Tjeknavorian
- Michael Brook
- Micheal Ganian
- Nor Dar
- Nune Hairapetian
- Razmik Mansourian
- Ruben Hakhverdyan
- Sako
- Shushan Petrosyan
- Sirusho
- System of a Down
- Tata Simonyan
- Tigran Mansuryan
- Vaco
