= George Tutunjian =

Armenian singer

George Tutunjian (Armenian: Ճորճ (Գեւորգ) Թութունճեան,Gevorg T’ut’unč̣ean; c. 1930 in Aleppo, Syria – November 7, 2006 in Montreal, Quebec, Canada) was a singer of Armenian patriotic and revolutionary songs and lifelong supporter of Armenian Revolutionary Federation (ARF). The Western Region Central Committee of the ARF honoured him with a medal for his contribution for playing an important role in the spreading of Armenian songs.

Tutunjian's parents were well-known singers. George Tutunjian started singing at the age of 22. Later on, Tutunjian used to perform with his four sons who were musically inclined. His oldest son played the piano, another son, the guitar, a third joined in vocals. He built a reception hall now owned and run by his three sons. He sang on Armenian stages for over 50 years and was an inspiration for many other Armenian singers such as Karnig Sarkissian, Harout Pamboukjian, and Nersik Ispiryan. Having been a pioneer in this genre, he helped accelerated the careers of such singers, with Karnig, being a protégé of George.

He eventually settled in Montreal, Quebec, Canada, where he died at the age of 76.

== Discography ==
=== Discography ===
Studio Albums:

- 1983 Im Gdage - Abril 24
- 2002 60th Anniversary (4-CD set)

Live Albums:

- 1978 Live In Beirut: Arunod Trosh
- 1988 Live In Los Angeles
- 2005 Live In Concert
