= Panos Kiamos discography =

- Studio albums: 18
- Singles: 28

This page is the discography of the Greek singer Panos Kiamos.

It consists of eighteen studio albums and twenty-eight singles, including "Thelo Na Se Xanado" which is Kiamos' biggest success.

== Studio albums ==
Title	Details	Peak chart positions
Title	Details	GRE
Enas Erotas Latreia Kai Anagki	Released: 1998; Label: Phonodisc, Ria Records; Formats: CD	—
Den Eisai Moni	Released: 1999; Label: Music Box International; Formats: CD	—
Tou Erota Feggaria	Released: 2000; Label: Music Box International; Formats: CD	—
Tis Nihtas To Oneiro	Released: 2002; Label: Music Box International; Formats: CD	—
To Gelio Sou Klei	Released: 2003; Label: Music Box International; Formats: CD	—
Live - Zontani Ihografisi Sto Fix	Released: 2004; Label: Music Box International; Formats: CD	—
Eisai Pantou	Released: 2005; Label: Music Box International; Formats: CD	—
Horis Nero Mporo	Released: 2005; Label: Music Box International; Formats: CD	—
Monima Erotevmenos	Released: 26 June 2006; Label: Universal Music; Formats: CD	—
Girna Se Mena	Released: 17 September 2007; Label: Universal Music; Formats: CD	—
Gia Agapi Etimasou	Released: 24 November 2008; Label: Universal Music; Formats: CD	—
Oi Dikes Mas Nihtes Live	Released: 2 June 2009; Label: Universal Music; Formats: CD	—
Tha Ziso Gia Mena	Released: 22 March 2010; Label: Universal Music; Formats: CD	—
Olokainourgios	Released: 11 April 2011; Label: Universal Music; Formats: CD	4
Krystalla	Released: 2012; Label: Universal Music; Formats: CD	1
Den Thelo Epafi	Released: 21 October 2013; Label: Cobalt Music; Formats: CD	1
Apo Asteri Se Asteri	Released: 30 October 2015; Label: Cobalt Music; Formats: CD	1
Panos Kiamos	Released: 9 March 2018; Label: Cobalt Music; Formats: CD	1

== Compilation albums ==
Title	Details	Peak chart positions
Title	Details	GRE
Panos Kiamos	Released: 2009; Label: Universal Music; Format: Digital download, CD, Promo	—
The Best of Panos Kiamos	Released: 2010; Label: Universal Music; Format: Digital download, CD, DVD, DVD-Video	9
The Universal Masters	Released: 2012; Label: Universal Music; Format: Digital download, CD	—
Best Of - 44 Megales Epitihies Pou Agapisame	Released: 7 November 2016; Label: Cobalt Music; Format: Digital download, CD	—

== Singles ==
=== As lead artist ===
Title	Year	Peak chart positions	Album
Title	Year	GRE	Album
"Ola Gia Senane Milane"	1998	—	Enas Erotas Latria Kai Anagki
"Tzin (Dance Mix)"/"Ston Adi Me Esteiles Fantaro"	2000	—	Den Eisai Moni
"Arketa"	2002	—	Tis Nihtas To Oneiro
"Agapi Mou Megali"	2003	—	To Gelio Sou Klei
"Eisai Pantou"	2005	—	Eisai Pantou
"San Tainia Palia"	2005	—	Eisai Pantou
"Vres Ligo Hrono"	2006	—	Eisai Pantou
"Metakomizo"	2007	3	CD single
"Girna Se Mena"	2007	2	Girna Se Mena
"Mia Katastrofi"	2010	—	Tha Ziso Gia Mena
"Sfyrixa... Ki Elixes"	2010	1	Tha Ziso Gia Mena
"Pagakia"	2010	—	Non-album single
"Apo Deftera"	2011	3	Olokainourgios
"Krystalla"	2012	2	Krystalla
"Fotia Me Fotia"	2012	2	Krystalla
"To Aima Mou Piso"	2012	3	Krystalla
"Diskola Vradia"	2013	—	Den Thelo Epafi
"Den Thelo Epafi"	2013	2	Den Thelo Epafi
"Krystalla (Mega Mix)"	2013	—	CD single
"Apo Asteri Se Asteri"	2015	6	Apo Asteri Se Asteri
"Pos Tha Ti Vgalo"	2015	13	Apo Asteri Se Asteri
"Trelokomeio"	2015	6	Apo Asteri Se Asteri
"Trelokomeio (Remix)" (feat. Master Tempo)	2016	—	Non-album single
"Sto Ftero"	2017	—	Non-album single
"Allou Esi"	2017	3	Panos Kiamos
"Hartaetos"	2018	1	Panos Kiamos

=== As featured artist ===
Title	Year	Peak chart positions	Album
Title	Year	GRE	Album
"Dio Matia Mple" (Goin' Through feat. Panos Kiamos)	2014	—	20 (Goin' Through album)
"Thelo Na Se Xanado" (Super Sako feat. Panos Kiamos & Bo)	2018	1	Panos Kiamos

== Other charted songs ==
Title	Year	Peak chart positions	Album
Title	Year	GRE	Album
"Sti Fotia To Heri Mou"	2007	8	Girna Se Mena
"Tha Vgeno, Tha Pino"	2007	4	Girna Se Mena
"To 'Heis"	2008	7	Oi Dikes Mas Nihtes Live
"Chartorihtra"	2008	2	Gia Agapi Etimasou
"Os Ton Ourano"	2008	7	Gia Agapi Etimasou
"Apopse Fora Ta Kala Sou"	2008	10	Gia Agapi Etimasou
"Den Mou Pernas"	2013	7	Den Thelo Epafi
"Tasis Figis"	2018	1	Panos Kiamos
"Afto Na To Thimase"	2018	7	Panos Kiamos

== Music videos ==
- 1998: Ola Gia Senane Milane (Phonodisc/ Ria Records)
- 1998: Trelós Gia Séna (Phonodisc/ Ria Records)
- 1999: Den Eísai Móni (Music Box International)
- 2000: Gýrna Píso (Music Box International)
- 2000: Ti Théleis Kai Zitás Logariasmó (Music Box International)
- 2001: Érotas (Music Box International) (me Sofía Víka)
- 2002: Arketá (Music Box International)
- 2002: Tóra Pou Boró/Den Tha Fýgeis (Music Box International)
- 2003: Agápi Mou Megáli (Music Box International)
- 2004: Ótan Péftei To Skotádi (Music Box International)
- 2004: Sti Thessaloníki Tragoudó (Music Box International)
- 2005: Eísai Pantoú (Music Box International)
- 2005: San Tainía Paliá (Music Box International)
- 2005: Vres Lígo Chróno (Music Box International)
- 2006: Écho Ponései Gi' Aftín (Polydor)
- 2006: Áse Me Mia Nýchta Móno (Polydor)
- 2006: Anemothýella (Polydor)
- 2007: Sti Fotiá To Chéri Mou (Polydor)
- 2007: Gýrna Se Ména (Polydor)
- 2007: Tha Vgaíno, Tha Píno (Polydor)
- 2008: Chartoríchtra (Universal Music Greece)
- 2008: Os Ton Ouranó (Universal Music Greece)
- 2010: Sfýrixa... Ki Élixes (Universal Music Greece)
- 2011: Olokaínourgios (Universal Music Greece)
- 2011: Apó Deftéra (Universal Music Greece)
- 2012: Krýstalla (Universal Music Greece)
- 2012: To Aíma Mou Píso (Universal Music Greece)
- 2012: Fotiá Me Fotiá (Universal Music Greece)
- 2012: Níkises Páli (Universal Music Greece)
- 2013: Den Thélo Epafí (Cobalt Music)
- 2013: De Mou Pernás (Cobalt Music)
- 2014: Dyo Mátia Ble (Cobalt Music) (me Goin' Through)
- 2015: Apó Astéri Se Astéri (Cobalt Music)
- 2015: Pós Tha Ti Vgálo (Cobalt Music)
- 2017: Alloú Esý (Cobalt Music)
- 2018: Chartaetós (Cobalt Music)
- 2018: Thélo Na Se Xanadó (Cobalt Music) (me Super Sako & Bo)
- 2018: Aftó Na To Thymásai (Cobalt Music)
