= Im Tiknikn Es =

"Im tiknikn es/You are my doll"

Single by Lilit Hovhannisyan
- Released: March 9, 2015
- Recorded: 2015
- Genre: Dance-pop; Pop
- Length: 3:55
- Songwriter(s): Vahram Petrosyan
- Producer(s): Vahram Petrosyan

Lilit Hovhannisyan singles chronology
"De el mi" (2015)	"Im tiknikn es/You are my doll" (2015)	"Mexican" (2015)

"Im tiknikn es" (Armenian: Իմ տիկնիկն ես English: You're my doll is a song by singer Lilit Hovhannisyan and Artsakhi-Armenian child singer Nanul. The song was written by Vahram Petrosyan, with production handled by the "DUETRO" Studio. It was released as a single on March 9, 2015. As of September 2021, it has more than 117 million views on YouTube, making it the 2nd most viewed song by an Armenian artist (not including songs by American band System of a Down) after Super Sako's Mi Gna. Director was Artyom Abovyan, who was also the cameraman.
