= Lament of Adana (song) =

Song
- Language: Armenian
- Published: 1909

Music video
- "Lament of Adana" performance on YouTube

The Lament of Adana (Ադանայի ողբը, Adanayi voghbe) is an Armenian traditional tragedy, belonging to the genre of ritual music and classified as a subgenre of massacre songs. It is performed by a soloist and has a slow tempo and a mournful mood. The song tells the story of the massacres that took place in Adana and other regions of Cilicia in 1909 during the Adana massacre, during which the Young Turks killed 30,000 Armenians.

== History and meaning ==
The Lament of Adana was created as a memorial to the victims of the 1909 Adana massacre. The lyrics and melody of the song reflect the pain of loss, the cruelty of the enemy, and the suffering of the Armenian people. It is not only a lament, but also a symbol of Armenian history and memory.

The melody of the song is characterized by simplicity and emotional depth. It is often accompanied by traditional musical instruments, such as the duduk, which gives the lament a melancholic mood.

== Lyrics ==
=== First version ===
Armenian transliteration	English translation
Kotoratsn angut, hayery tog hlan, Anapat dartsav shkhegh Atanan. Krake, sure u ankhightch talan, Rubenyats tune, akh, erav veran. Al mi tar luysd, paytsar aregak, Lusin, shurtch kape dun sugi manyak, Antsav mer yerkren haravi khorshak, Chortsuts, thormetsuts tsar-tsaghik hamak. Rope me chantsav u hayots kheghtcher, Inkan surin tak khuzanin ahegh. Zhamer u dprotss botsi mej koran, Byuravor hayer ankhna meran. Parap e avagh, harust Atanan, Mokhir e dartser amboghtch Kilikyan, Miayn apretsav Hadchne siroyn, Inchu chi shardzhir aparazh Zeytun. Yerek or gisher krake mezhen, Thshnamvuyn sure, gndake drsen, Jnjetsin haye yerkrin yeresen, Aryun ke vaze mer jinj geteren. Al bav e vorkan vaterun lutse Kretsink, thoghunk mer latsn u kotse, Otarin tune al che apahov, Hay hoghi vra mernink menk sharkov.	Let Armenians weep for the merciless massacre, Magnificent Adana has turned into a desert. The fire, the sword, and the pitiless looting— Ah, they devastated the House of the Rubenids. Give your light no more, O bright sun, Moon, bind around yourself a necklace of mourning, The southern blast swept through our land, Withered and faded every tree and flower. Not a moment passed before the poor Armenians Fell under the sword of the terrifying mob. Churches and schools vanished in flames, Tens of thousands of Armenians died without mercy. Alas, wealthy Adana is now empty, All of Cilicia has turned to ashes. Only lovely Hadjin survived, Why does rugged Zeytun not move? Three days and nights, fire from within, The enemy's sword and bullet from without, Wiped the Armenians off the face of the earth, Blood flows from our crystal rivers. Enough of bearing the yoke of the vile ones, Let us leave behind our weeping and wailing, The foreigner's house is no longer safe, Let us die with glory on Armenian soil.

=== Second version ===
Armenian transliteration	English translation
Kotoratsn angut, hayery togh lan, Anapatdartsav shkhegh Atanan. Krakn u sure yev ankhightch talan, Rubinyants tune, akh, erin veran. Rope me chantsav u hayots kheghtcher, Inkan surin tak khuzanin ahegh, Zhamer u dprotssk botsi mej koran, Byuravor hayer ankhnay meran. Parap er avagh, harust Atanan, Mokhir er dartser amboghtch Kilikian. Miayn apretsav Hadchne sirun, Inchu chi shardzhir aparazh Zeytun. Tserek u gisher krake mezhen, Thshnamun sure, gndake drsen, Jnjetsin haye yerkrin yeresen, Aryun ke vaze mer jinj geteren.	Let Armenians weep for the merciless massacre, Magnificent Adana turned into a desert. The fire, the sword, and the pitiless looting— Ah, they devastated the House of the Rubenids. Not a moment passed before the poor Armenians Fell under the sword of the terrifying mob, Churches and schools vanished in flames, Tens of thousands of Armenians died without mercy. Alas, wealthy Adana was empty, All of Cilicia had turned to ashes. Only lovely Hadjin survived, Why does rugged Zeytun not move? Day and night, fire from within, The enemy's sword, the bullet from without, Wiped the Armenians off the face of the earth, Blood flows from our crystal rivers.

== Performance and legacy ==
The Lament of Adana is often performed on memorial days, especially the Armenian Genocide Remembrance Day, as a symbol of the history and spiritual heritage of the Armenian people. Famous performers of the song include Agapi Ghazaryan, Zaruhi Babayan, Flora Martirosian, Garnik Sargsyan, Harout Pamboukjian, and Sahak Sislyan.

== See also ==
- Adana massacre
- Armenian Genocide
- Armenian music
- Duduk
