= Lilit Hovhannisyan =

- Born: 7 December 1987 (age 38); Yerevan, Armenian SSR, USSR
- Genres: Pop; folk
- Occupations: Singer; fashion designer; music video director
- Instruments: Vocals; piano
- Years active: 2006–present
- Website: lilithovhannisyan.com

Lilit Vachagani Hovhannisyan (Armenian: Լիլիթ Վաչագանի Հովհաննիսյան, born 7 December 1987), is an Armenian pop singer.

== Career ==
=== 2006: Hay Superstar ===
Lilit was a finalist of the first season of Hay Superstar, the Armenian version of Pop Idol. She was eliminated on 3 July 2006, placing fourth out of the ten participants.

=== 2011 - 2013: Early Success ===
Lilit has had several successful singles since 2011. As of September 2021, her music video for Im tiknikn es has over 117 million views, making it the 2nd most viewed song on YouTube by an Armenian artist (not including songs by American band System of a Down) after Super Sako's Mi Gna, her music videos for Gnchu and Es Em Horinel and De El Mi have achieved over 5 million views on YouTube. The videos for Im Srtin Asa, Te Axchiq Lineir, Eli Lilit and Armenian Girl have achieved over 3 million views. On 29 September 2013, Lilit performed a solo concert entitled 'Top Stars of Armenia' alongside Mihran Tsarukyan in Los Angeles, California at the Pasadena Civic Auditorium.

=== 2014: Fashion Design ===
In 2014, Lilit launched an online platform for customers to purchase custom-designed outfits and accessories designed by Lilit.

=== 2019: Dream World Tour ===
Lilit's Dream World Tour took place across 70 cities around the world, including the whole of Europe, with shows in countries such as France, Germany, Sweden, Spain, Greece, Bulgaria, and Russia. The Tour also visited many capitals, with countries including Switzerland, Poland, Czechia, Abkhazia, Georgia, Denmark, Netherlands, Latvia, Ukraine, and the UK. There were other Northern and Southern American dates added, including the USA, Canada, Brazil, Argentina. Lilit's tour also including dates in Asia, the Middle East, and Oceania, such as Kazakhstan, Kuwait, Israel, Lebanon and Australia. On 9 March 2019, the Tour started in Yerevan, Armenia and finished on 18 November 2019 in Kyiv, Ukraine.

=== 2020 to present ===
In January 2022, Hovhannisyan released her second studio album Dream: Iconic Remakes.

== Personal life ==
Hovhannisyan is married to Armenian songwriter and record producer Vahram Petrosyan since June 29, 2011.

In August 2019, Hovhannisyan became the first ever Armenian artist to be awarded a Certificate of Appreciation by the City of Los Angeles.

As of April 2024, Hovhannisyan holds the most number of followers on Social Media and Youtube, and has the largest fan base of any Armenian artist. She also holds the record for one of the most views on Youtube for any Armenian singer.

== Discography ==
=== Studio albums ===
- Nran (2011)
- Dream: Iconic Remakes (2022)

=== Singles ===
- "Voch-Voch" (2011)
- "Nran" (2011)
- "Mayrik" (2011)
- "Im Srtin Asa" (2012)
- "Too-Too-Too" (2012) (produced by DerHova)
- "Te Aghjik Lineir" (2012)
- "Es Em Horinel" (2012)
- "Requiem" (2013)
- "Qez Mi Or Togheci" (2013)
- "Gnchu" (2013)
- "Eli Lilit" (2013)
- "Elegia" (2013)
- "Qez Khabel Em" (2014)
- "Armenian Girl" (2014) (produced by DerHova)
- "Indz Chspanes" (2014)
- "De El Mi" (2014)
- "Im tiknikn es" (2015)
- "Mexican" (2015) (Armenian, Spanish)
- "Im Ser,Atum Em Qez" (2015)
- "Im bajin sere" (2016)
- "HETDIMO" (2016)
- "Hin Chanaparhov" (2016)
- "Avirel Es" (2017)
- "Balkan Song" (2018)
- "Bulgarian" (2018)
- "Tshnamus chem cankana" (2018)
- "Ti ti ti" (2021)
- "Yeli Yeli" (2023)
- "Ush a" (2024)
- "Nor ynkeruhud asa" (2024)
- "Abnormal" (2024)
|}

=== Soundtracks ===
- "Spanvats aghavni" ("Spanvats aghavni ", 2009)
- "Shatakhos andzrev" ("Tigrani moloraky", 2012)
- "Qami" ("Yntryalnery", 2013)

== Awards and achievements ==
Here is chronologically the awards Lilit Hovhannisyan has received so far.

Year	Award	Category	City	Result
2008	Yntsa Awards	The Grand Prize	Yerevan	Won
2008	Armenian National Music Awards	The Revelation of the Year	Yerevan	Won
2009		The Most Downloaded Song		Won
2009	Armenian National Music Awards	Best female singer	Yerevan	Won
2009	Armenian National Music Awards	Best Soundtrack of the Year	Yerevan	Won
2010		The Most Desirable Armenians prize		Won
2011	Hayfanat	Best Duet of the Year	Armenia	Won
2011	Dar 21 TV Music Awards	Best Duet of the Year		Won
2012	De facto magazine	Best Female-singer of the Year		Won
2012	Dar 21 TV Music Awards.	Best Video of the Year		Won
2012	Dar 21 TV Music Awards.	Best female singer		Won
2012	Public Television company of Armenia	The best video of April	Yerevan	Won
2012	Public Television company of Armenia	The best video of September	Yerevan	Won
2012	Public Television company of Armenia	The best video of December	Yerevan	Won
2013	Armenian Pulse Music Awards	The 2013 Best Video (Es em Horinel)	Yerevan	Won
2013	Armenian Pulse Music Awards	The 2013 Best Song (Es em Horinel)	Yerevan	Won
2013	Armenia Music Awards	The Best Female Singer	Yerevan	Won
2014	World Armenian Entertainment	The Best Female Singer		Won
2014	Dar 21 TV Music Awards.	The Best Female-singer		Won
2015	Dar 21 TV Music Awards	The Best Dance Video ("De el mi")		Won
2015	Dar 21 TV Music Awards	The Best Cover of the Year		Won
2016	Pan Armenian Entertainment Awards	The Best Female Singer	LA	Won
2017	Armenia TV Music Awards Sochi	Song of the Year	Sochi	Won
2018	Armenia TV Music Awards Sochi	Song of the Year	Sochi	Won
