= Asatryan =

Asatryan (Armenian: Ասատրյան) is an Armenian surname. Notable people with the surname include:

- Aram Asatryan (1953–2006), Armenian singer
- Artem Asatryan (born 1972), Armenian politician
- Bagrat Asatryan (born 1956), Armenian economist
- Elen Asatryan (born 1983), Armenian-American politician
- Hayk Asatryan (1900–1956), Armenian political theorist
- Karen Asatryan (born 1974), Armenian football player
- Matevos Asatryan (1985–2023), Armenian politician
- Nune Asatryan, Armenian-born Russian boxer
- Paytsar Asatryan (born 1999), Armenian football player
- Sona Asatryan (born 1999), Armenian chess player
- Tigran Asatryan (born 1975), Armenian singer, son of Aram
- Vahagn Asatryan (1977–2020), Armenian military leader
