= Gor Mkhitarian =

Armenian singer and songwriter (born 1973)

Gor Mkhitarian Գոռ Մխիթարյան
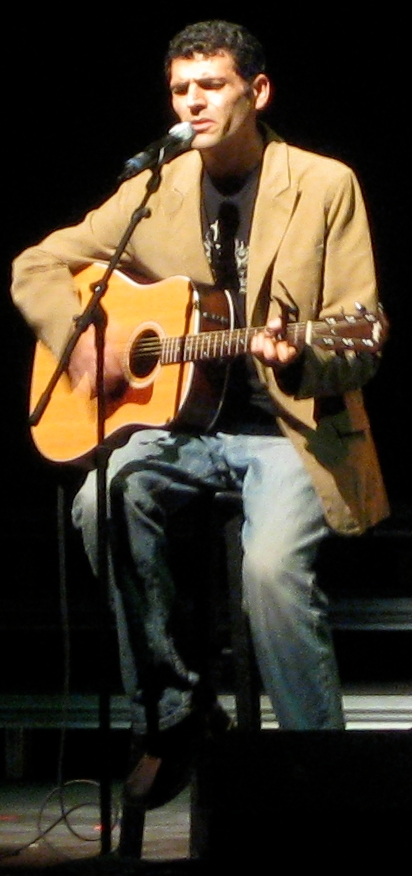
- Gor Mkhitarian performing in Glendale, California

Background information
- Born: Gor Mkhitarian; 1973 (age 52–53); Vanadzor, Armenia
- Genres: Rock, folk
- Occupation: singer
- Years active: 2001 – present
- Website: Official website

Gor Mkhitarian (Armenian: Գոռ Մխիթարյան; born in 1973 in Vanadzor, Armenia) is an Armenian singer and songwriter who started his musical career in Armenia. He immigrated to the United States and now is based in Los Angeles. In Armenia, he started with the rock formation Lav Eli. He developed his solo career starting in 2001 with a number of albums in various genres including pop, rock, and folk music. He sings both in English and Armenian.

== Biography ==
=== In band Lav Eli ===
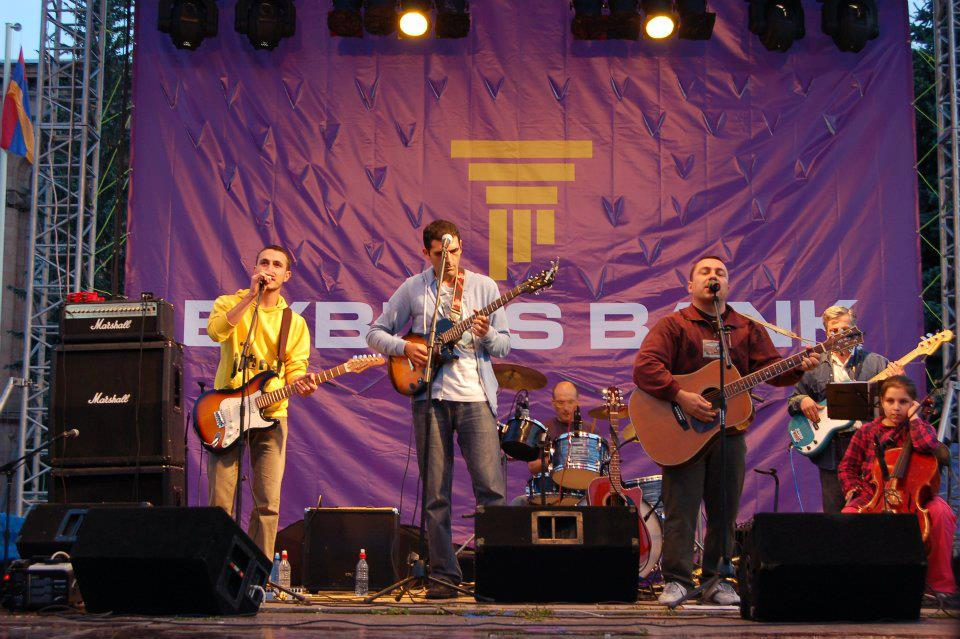
Gor Mkhitarian (middle) in Lav Eli band

Gor was widely known throughout Armenia as the lead guitarist for one of country's best rock bands, Lav Eli (in Armenian Լավ էլի) that he established with fellow musician Mher Manukyan in 1996.

The original set-up was:

- Mher Manukyan - vocals and guitar
- Gor Mkhitaryan - guitar, backing vocals
- Vahe Terteryan - bass
- Davit Grigoryan - drums

Later on, with drummer David Grigoryan and bassist Vahe Terteryan leaving, the band was accentuated with more members, including a new bass player:

- Tigran Voskanyan - bass
- Bagrat Aznavouryan - guitar, backing vocals (2007–2019)
- Gor Tadevosyan - guitar, backing vocals
- Shogher manukyan - cello
- Vardan Paremuzyan - drums

Besides Lav Eli, Mkhitaryan also worked with the group Snack.

=== In Force Major project ===
Force Major (in Armenian Ֆօրս Մաժոր) was Mkhitarian's one-year experimental jam project established in 2000. Stylized as FORCE MAJOR, it was made up of:

- Gor Mkhitarian - guitars, percussion
- Vahe Terteryan - bass
- Davit Grigoryan - drums
- Shaun Hall - keyboard
- Edgar Sargsyan - guitar

Guest musicians included Anush (flute), Diana (violin), Artyom (dhol), Aharon (guitar) and Mher Bekchyan (vocals). The project released a 5-track EP Force Major

=== Solo ===
Mkhitarian launched his solo career in 2001 with his debut solo album Yeraz and has released six more albums since: Godfather Tom (2003), Episode (2004), self-titled GOR (2006), Acoustic Folklore (2007), United Fantasies: Exit Ahead (2008) and Spirit (2009). Having been nominated for 14 industry music awards, he makes music that fuses traditional Armenian music with both rock and folk idioms.

In 2003, Mkhitarian moved to Los Angeles where drummer Andranik Harutyunyan, bassist Varoujan Hovakimyan, pianist Art Grigorian and guitarist Jay Dean joined the band. Stepping away from his previous acoustic-driven "signature", with the new band he features remarkable musicianship and showcases a different approach to his songwriting.

Gor Mkhitarian cites Simon & Garfunkel, Sting, and The Dave Matthews Band, to name a few, as strongly influencing his music. Traces of Armenian folk troubadours Ruben Hakhverdyan and Harout Bezjian as well as Bob Dylan can at times be heard in Mkhitarian's solo material.

== Awards ==
- 2007 Armenian Music Awards Winner—Best Alternative Folk Album ("Acoustic Folklore")
- 2006 Armenian Music Awards Nomination—Best Rock Album ("GOR")
- 2006 Armenian Music Awards Nomination—Best Music Video ("Stigma")
- 2005 Armenian Music Awards Winner—Best Music Video ("Wherever")
- 2005 Armenian Music Awards Nomination—Best Original Song ("Cold Wagon 1993")
- 2005 Armenian Music Awards Nomination—Best Folk-Rock Album ("Episode")
- 2004 Big Apple Music Awards Winner—Best Contemporary Singer ("Episode")
- 2004 Armenian Music Awards Nomination—Best Alternative Folk Album ("Godfather Tom")
- 2004 Armenian Music Awards Nomination—Best Album Cover-Design ("Godfather Tom")
- 2002 Armenian Music Awards Winner—Best Album Cover-Design ("Yeraz")
- 2002 Armenian Music Awards Nomination—Best Alternative Folk Album ("Yeraz")
- 2002 Armenian Music Awards Nomination—Best Newcomer (Gor Mkhitarian)
- 2002 Just Plain Folks Nomination—Best Ethnic/World Music Song ("Yeraz")
- 2002 Just Plain Folks Nomination—Best Ethnic/World Music Album ("Yeraz")

== Discography ==
=== Albums ===
In Lav Eli

- 1995: Aha yev menk (in Armenian "Ահա և մենք")
- 1996: First Lav Album (in Armenian "Առաջին ԼԱՎ Ալբոմ")
- 1999: Essays (in Armenian "Էսսեներ")
- 2006: Notes From Vanadzor – Urban Armenian Rock

Solo

- 2001: Yeraz (in Armenian "Երազ")
- 2003: Godfather Tom (in Armenian "Կնքահայր Թոմ")
- 2004: Episode
- 2006: GOR (in Armenian "Գոռ")
- 2007: Acoustic Folklore
- 2008: United Fantasies: Exit Ahead
- 2009: Spirit (in Armenian "Հոգի")
- 2013: Live at Steve's Ranch
- 2016: Passport

== Videography ==
- "Return"
- "Wherever"
- "STIGMA"
- "Inchu Bingyole Mtar"
- "Blessing"
- "About God"
- "Last Letter"
