= Rabiz =

Armenian popular music genre

- Stylistic origins: Mugham; Arabesque; Russian chanson
- Cultural origins: Late 1960s, Soviet Armenia
- Typical instruments: Duduk, Caucasian dhol, Clarinet, Synthesizer, Zurna, Kamancheh (rare)

Subgenres
- Pop rabiz

Other topics
- Armenian folk; Armenian pop; Blatnaya pesnya

Rabiz or rabis (Armenian: ռաբիզ or Armenian: ռաբիս) is a genre of Armenian popular music, distinguished by its lyrics and dance-oriented synthesized melodies in 6/8 time signature with elements of Armenian folk music. Rabiz first emerged in Yerevan in the 1970-80s and was often associated with Armenian migrants from rural regions of Armenia. Rabiz singers are with few exceptions male. More recently, rabiz songs have been augmented with heavier arrangements and electronic dance music elements in their instrumentation. This music genre could be compared with famous Balkan genres. Among others Romanian manele, Bulgarian chalga, Albanian tavalla and Greek laiko.

Though the singers and their audience primarily refer to rabiz as a music genre, the term is also used broadly to refer to a certain type of subculture with its particular fashion, Russian-derived slang, and lifestyle. The genre has received criticism from various music critics due to its perceived similarities to Middle Eastern music. Prominent performers of the genre include Aram Asatryan, Tatul Avoyan (known by the mononym Tatul), and Hayk Ghevondyan (known as Spitakci Hayko or more commonly by the mononym Hayko).

The musical language of the rabiz, being a blend of several musical traditions (primarily Armenian national music, called ashug. [Bardic-style] and Eastern in the style of the makam [classical court music]), it is marked by delicate Eastern harmony and an abundance of melisinas, which allow the musician to achieve the desired effect by purely musical means.

Some performances of rabiz music are characterized by code-switching in which rabiz performers such as Mingichauri Samo (Samvel Avanesyan) and Spitakci Hayko (Hayk Ghevondyan) – reminiscent of similarly multilingual pieces by ashughs such as Sayat-Nova – improvise simultaneously in different languages such as Armenian, Kurdish or Russian.

Outside of Armenia, rabiz also enjoys popularity in the Armenian diaspora, particularly in Russia and Los Angeles, California. Many of the performers of the genre are now greatly popular with Armenian diaspora listeners as well.

== Etymology ==
Despite the term's widespread use, the etymology or definition of the word "rabiz" is not clearly understood. According to some sources it stems from the Russian phrase "работники искусства" (rabotniki iskusstva) used during Soviet times, meaning "Art Workers", in reference to unions which specialized in new music composition. Others believe that the word has Arabic roots, since the word rab (Arabic: رَبّ) means creator or god, while the Arabic name aziz (Arabic: رَبّ; Armenian: ազիզ), which is used by many Armenians as meaning "darling" could perhaps be considered another root, thus referring to the genre performers as dear creators.

== Varieties ==
Kef, a subgenre of rabiz music, unrelated to the homonymous Armenian-American kef music, concerns romantic love and partying, but also love of family or patriotism, similarly to Russian chanson or blatnyak.

== "Mi Gna" ==
In 2016, rabiz music achieved international commercial success with the viral hit single "Mi Gna" released by Armenian American rapper Super Sako, on his album Love Crimes. Although an earlier version of the song in Armenian was composed by Artak Aramyan, the remixed version of the song with additional English lyrics by Super Sako propelled it to success. The song features vocals by Hayk Ghevondyan. "Mi Gna" hit #1 on Shazam Top 100 list, with its YouTube video upload has garnered over 190 million views. The song has been remixed numerous times since, as well as released in different language versions, including Albanian, Arabic, Bulgarian, Dutch, French, German, Hebrew, Kurdish (Sorani), Romanian, Russian, Serbian, and Turkish. A trilingual Armenian/English/French version, remixed by French-Congolese rapper Maître Gims, achieved success in France and the Francophone world.

== Famous artists ==
- Aram Asatryan
- Tatul Avoyan
- Tata Simonyan
- Armenchik
- Super Sako
- Spitakci Hayko

== See also ==
- Music of Armenia
- Balkan music
- Manele
- Chalga
- Tallava
- Laiko
