= Arabo =

Armenian fedayi leader

- Արաբօ
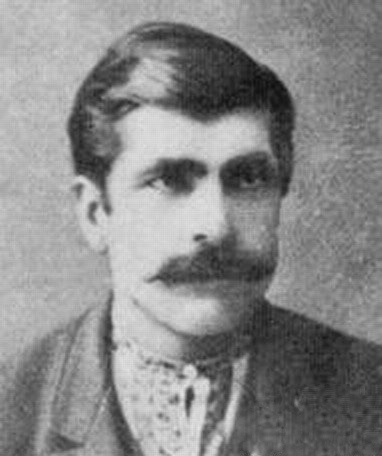
- Arabo (c. 1890)
- Born: Arakel Mkhitarian; 1863; Kurter village, Bitlis Vilayet, Ottoman Empire
- Died: 1895 (aged 31–32); The road from Khnus to Mush, Ottoman Empire
- Military career
- Allegiance: Dashnaktsutyun
- Service years: late 1880s—1893
- Conflicts: Armenian national movement

Arabo or Arapo (Armenian: Արաբօ, 1863–1895), born Arakel Mkhitarian, was an Armenian fedayi of the late 19th century. He was a member of the Armenian Revolutionary Federation (ARF) political party.

Arabo was born in the village of Kurter in the region of Sasun in the Bitlis vilayet. Arabo studied at the Arakelots Monastery school in Mush. Beginning in the late-1880s, he led the Armenian fedayi groups in Sasun and Taron. Initially, Arabo had formed a group modeled on those of the Kurdish bandits, to rob their enemies in turn and becoming a folk hero among Armenians. However, he became a revolutionary during his time in the Caucasus.

Starting in 1889, Arabo visited the Caucasus several times. In 1892, he was arrested by Turkish authorities and sentenced to 15 years of imprisonment, but escaped from prison and resumed his fedayi activities. He took part in the first ARF conference in Tiflis in 1892. In spring of 1893, while returning to Ottoman Armenia from the Caucasus to help rebels from Sasun, he was killed in 1895 along with four of his comrades during a battle with Kurdish bands on the road from Khnus to Mush.

== See also ==
- "Zartir lao", a popular folk song about Arabo
- Armenian fedayi
- Armenian national movement
