= Harout Pamboukjian =

Armenian singer

Harout Pamboukjian Հարութ Փամբուկչյան
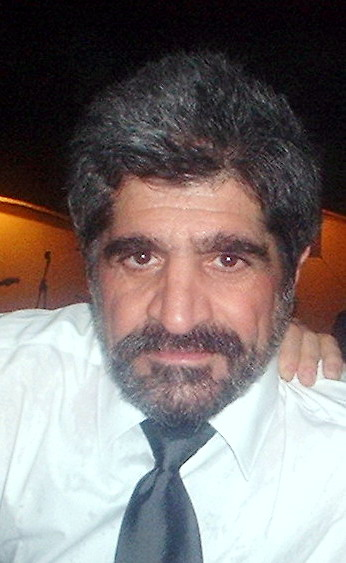
- Harout Pamboukjian in Aleppo, 2007, during an Armenian Christmas concert

Background information
- Born: July 1, 1950 (age 76); Yerevan, Armenian SSR, Soviet Union
- Genres: Pop, folk, patriotic
- Occupation: Singer
- Years active: 1970–present
- Labels: PE-KO Records; Parseghian Records; Hollywood Music Center
- Website: haroutpamboukjian.com

Harout Pamboukjian (Armenian: Հարութ Փամբուկչյան; Western Armenian: Յարութ Փամպուքճեան; born July 1, 1950), also known as Dzakh Harut (Armenian: Ձախ Հարութ, lit. 'Left Harout', owing to his left-handed style of playing guitar), is an Armenian pop singer living in Los Angeles, California. His Armenian dance, folk, revolutionary and romantic songs have made him a favorite among Armenians worldwide.

== Early life ==
Harout Pamboukjian was born on July 1, 1950, in Yerevan, Armenia (then part of the Soviet Union). In his early teens, he took lessons in many musical instruments including the guitar, the bouzouki and saz (stringed instruments), the dhol (drums) and the piano, later forming a band called Erebouni. His interest in music was initially influenced by his mother Tsaghik Shahakyan, who was also a singer. Erebouni went from village to village playing everything from Charles Aznavour to Deep Purple and Elvis Presley, at weddings and universities. Due to restrictions under the Soviet Union, Harout and most of his family left Soviet Armenia in 1975 and moved to Lebanon. A year later, he moved to Los Angeles, California and resided in Hollywood.

== Music career ==
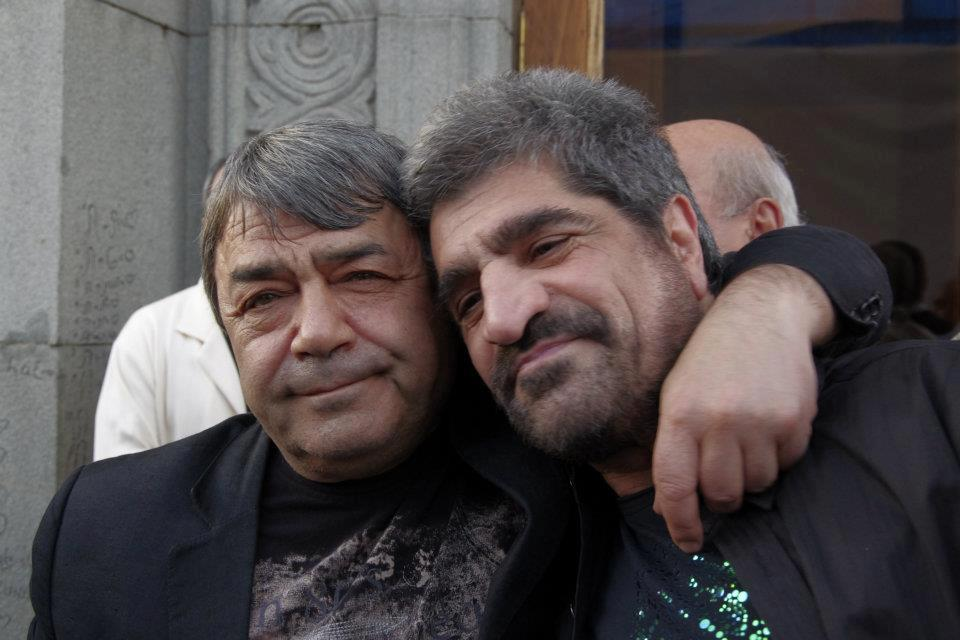
Harout Pamboukjian with Ruben Hakhverdyan in Yerevan, 2012.

Only two months after his arrival in Los Angeles, Harout put together a studio band and recorded his first album at the Quad Teck studio, called "Our Eyir Astvats" (Armenian: Ուր էիր Աստված, meaning "Where Were You, God?"), in reference to the Armenian genocide. His first album contains clarinet, organ, and bass, instead of the duduk or synths, which is the sound that he would since become known for. Only a few of the songs on the album are dance-oriented, differing from the material that later made him popular at weddings, earning him the nickname "The Armenian Wedding Singer".

Harout has interpreted songs composed by artists such as Ruben Hakhverdyan, Harout Bedrossian and Arthur Meschian. His most popular songs include the centuries-old folk tunes about protecting the soil and fighting in the highlands, including "Antranik Pasha" (Armenian: Անդրանիկ Փաշա), "Sassouni Orore" (Armenian: Սասունի օրորը, meaning "Lullaby of Sasun"), and "Msho Aghchig" (Armenian: Մշո աղջիկ, meaning "Girl from Mush"), that have appealed to his fans' nationalistic pride. He is most fond of Ruben Hakhverdyan, who he produced the almost all-acoustic "Yerke Nayev Aghotk E" (Armenian: Երգը նաև աղոթք է, meaning "Songs Are Also Prayers") album with in the year 2000. Harout has also covered favorites such as "Nuné" (Armenian: Նունե).

A year after the 1988 Armenian earthquake, which killed over 25,000 people and left many more homeless, thousands of fans looking for some kind of temporary diversion from the devastation packed the Hrazdan Stadium and the Karen Demirchyan Complex to hear 28 concerts performed by Harout.

In 2008, Harout appeared as children's music singer Bread Harrity on the Adult Swim sketch comedy show Tim and Eric Awesome Show, Great Job!, performing a song about spaghetti and meatballs.

Harout has released over 20 albums. Some of his famous interpretations include "Asmar Aghchig" (Armenian: Ասմար աղջիկ, meaning "Dark Skinned Girl"), "Zokanch" (Armenian: Զոքանչ, meaning "Mother-in-law"), "Msho Aghchig" (Armenian: Մշո աղջիկ, meaning "Girl from Mush"), "Msho Dashter" (Armenian: Մշո դաշտեր, meaning "Fields of Mush"), "Hye Kacher" (Armenian: Հայ քաջեր, meaning "Armenian Heroes"), "50 Daree" (Armenian: 50 տարի, meaning "50 Years") and "Hey Jan Ghapama" (Armenian: Հեյ ջան ղափամա).

== Personal life ==
Harout Pamboukjian was married to Rouzanna Tevosian until her death in 2013. They had one son, who was born in 1980.

== Discography ==
=== Studio albums ===
- Oour Eyir Ahstvats (1976)
- Ballad Hayrenyatz (1977)
- Aravoditz Irigoun (1978)
- Harout (1979)
- Minchev Ekouts (1980)
- In Memory Of Those Who Gave Their Lives (1980)
- Im Yerevan (1981)
- Kedi Ayn Apin (1981)
- Yerp Alegodz Dzovu Vra (1982)
- Top’82/The Very Best of Harout Pamboukjian (1982)
- Heratsadz Engerner (1983)
- Vol. 12 (1984)
- Hayi Achker (1986)
- Hay Baliknerin (1988)
- Knas Parov (1989)
- Yeregoyan Yerevan (1991)
- Pari Daretarts (1993)
- Jambanere Bingyoli (feat. Rouzanna Pamboukjian) (1994)
- The Golden Album (1997)
- Harout 2000/Haroutn Hayots (2000)
- Yerke Nayev Aghotk E (feat. Ruben Hakhverdyan) (2000)
- My Life (2013)

=== Compilation albums ===
- Harout Box Set - The Best of 1974-1984 (1984)
- 25 Dance Hits (1998)
- Hit Romances: 50 Daris (1999)
- Romantic Flashback (1999)
- Patriotic Songs (2000)
- Love Songs (2000)
- Dance Party Mix (2000)
- Toukh Achker (2003)
- Paylogh Asdgher (2005)

=== Live albums ===
- Live in Beirut (1980)
- Live in Los Angeles (1988)
- Live in Beirut Volume 2 (1994)
- Live in Concert Vol. 1 (feat. Harut Hagopian) (1996)
- Live in Concert Vol. 2 (feat. Harut Hagopian) (1996)
- National & Patriotic Songs Vol. 1 Live (1997)
- National & Patriotic Songs Vol. 2 Live (1997)
- National & Patriotic Songs Vol. 3 Live (1997)
- Live in California (2001)
- The Legend: Live in Concert (2015)
- Harout Live! From the Heart! (2015)
- Live at Dolby Theatre (2017)
- Live in France (2018)
- My Ouai Tour Marseille (2023)

=== Singles and EPs ===
- Marali Bes (1981)
- Sari Jampov (1981)
- Ser Jan (1981)
- Toukh Acher (1981)
- Im Arajin Ser (1981)
- Mer Hayrenik (1997)
- Menag Es Mnatsel (feat. Silvi) (2006)
- Sareri Kami (feat. Ruben Hakhverdyan) (2012)
- Tariner (feat. Sirusho) (2014)
- Ancir Ay Getak (feat. Armenchik) (2014)
- Angakh Hayastan (feat. Tigran Asatryan & Sammy Flash) (2016)
- Te Acheres (feat. Super Sako) (2016)
- Zoqanch (feat. Dj Donz) (2017)
- Te Achers Kez Voronem (2017)
- Karmir Tsaghik Me Garuni (feat. Anna Boyrazyan) (2017)
- Tebi Sassoun (feat. Karnig Sarkissian) (2018)
- Ha Nina Nina (feat. Sammy Flash) (2018)
- Es Arantz Kez (2018)
- Yerp Siroum Es Indz (2018)
- Karmir Tsaghik (feat. Anna Boyrazyan) (2019)
- Tsovn E Sharachum (2019)
- Siro Navak (feat. Sona Sarafyan) (2022)
- Qaram Dardzats (feat. Seda) (2022)
- Sirum Em Qez (feat. Dj Davo) (2022)
- Kancnen Orer (feat. Reincarnation) (2022)
- Ekar Hovi Teverov (feat. Arame) (2023)
