= Tatul Avoyan =

Tatul Avoyan Թաթուլ Ավոյան
- Also known as: Tatul
- Born: 20 August 1964 (age 61); Yerevan, Armenian SSR, Soviet Union
- Genres: Rabiz
- Occupations: Singer; songwriter
- Instrument: Vocals
- Labels: Akhtamar Records; Parseghian Records

Tatul Frunziki Avoyan (Note: Armenian: Թաթուլ Ֆրունզիկի Ավոյան, romanized: Tʻatʻul Frunziki Avoyan; Known commonly by his mononym Tatul or Tatoul) (born August 20, 1964) is an Armenian singer of rabiz music.

== Biography ==
Tatul Avoyan was born on 20 August 1964 in Yerevan, the capital of Armenia (then part of the Soviet Union). His father, Frunzik "Frounz" Avoyan, was one of the pioneering artists in the rabiz genre.

Avoyan graduated from the Romanos Melikian Musical College.

He is an Armenian rabiz singer, particularly known for his widespread hits "Papik Em Dartsel" (Armenian: Պապիկ եմ դարձել, meaning "I've Become a Grandfather"), performed with Spitakci Hayko (Hayk Ghevondyan), and "Im Axperes" (Armenian: Իմ ախպերս, meaning "My Brother"). His brothers Ashot, Serozh, Samvel, and Serob are also musicians.

== Discography ==
=== Studio albums ===
- Darnatsel E Ays Ashkhare (1992)
- Chem Uzum (1995)
- Yerazner (1996)
- Siro Yeraz (1997)
- Tatoul & Hovo (1997)
- The Best of Tatoul (1998)
- Asdvadz Im (1998)
- Keghdz Ashkhar (1999)
- Gaghtni Mna (2000)
- Tatoul & Hovo "2000" (2001)
- Tatoul & Hovo "Noritz Menk" (2003)
- Aysor Yev Misht (2003)
- Tatoul & Vle "Yes U Du" (2007)
- One & Only (2010)
- Gold Collection (2012)
- The Legacy Continues [2-CD Set] (Unreleased Album)

=== Live albums ===
- Tatoul, Anna, Armen, Koji "Live: Vol. 1" (2004)
- Tatoul, Anna, Armen, Koji "Live: Vol. 2" (2004)
- Live Concert in Yerevan (2004)
- Tatoul & Stars (2004)
- Tatoul, Armen, Artash (2005)
- Live Concert (2006)
- Tatoul & Hayko "Live" (2007)
- Live Concert in Greece (2008)
- Nostalgie: Live Concert (2008)

=== Singles ===
- Jutak (feat. Afon Masumyan) (1999)
- Anitsum Em Ays Ashkhare (feat. Grisha Aghakhanyan) (2000)
- Yekav Anush Garune (2002)
- Tsnoghi Srbutyun (feat. Hovik Avetisyan) (2009)
- Pandukht (feat. Seno) (2009)
- Yerazners (feat. Arsen Hayrapetyan) (2009)
- Havatam (feat. Super Sako) (2010)
- Varderi Taguhi Es (feat. Bojak) (2011)
- Amen Or Em Spasum (2012)
- Mi Kich Zhamanak (Live) (2012)
- Let's Go Back... (feat. Super Sako) (2012)
- Dimanam Dimanam (feat. Saqo Haroutyunyan) (2013)
- Imanam Imanam (feat. Lusine Grigoryan) (2013)
- Heranam (feat. Dj Davo) (2013)
- Im Balik (feat. Spitakci Hayko) (2015)
- Shnorhavor (feat. Dj Davo) (2015)
- Na Na Na (feat. Super Sako) (2016)
- Kamar Kamar (feat. Dj Davo) (2016)
- Jana Jana (feat. Spitakci Hayko & Dj Davo) (2016)
- Yeraz E Na (feat. Dj Davo) (2016)
- Zangum Em (feat. Dj Davo) (2017)
- Heranal (feat. Dj Davo) (2017)
- Che Chem Karogh (feat. Dj Davo) (2017)
- Aman Aman (feat. Dj Davo & Eric Shane) (2017)
- Molor Molor (feat. Lusine Grigoryan) (2018)
- Imnes (feat. Dj Davo) (2018)
- Ko Ser E (feat. DJ Hakop) (2018)
- Kamats Kamats (feat. DJ Jilber) (2018)
- Chi Linum Patahakan (2020)
- Gaghtni Mna (feat. Ara Alik Avetisyanner) (2020)
- Du Es Du (DJ Hye FX Remix) (2021)
- Yar Ari (feat. Levon Seyranyan) (2021)
- Srtis Banalin (feat. Big-E & Krayzie Bone) (2022)
- Vay Vay (feat. Nana) (2023)
- Man Es Galis (feat. Arman Mardanyan) (2023)
- Kez Sirelov (feat. Dj Davo) (2024)
- Axchiknere Haykakan (feat. Valkar) (2024)
- Drink and Have Fun/Ker Xmi (Russian: Пей, кайфуй) (feat. Grisha Navasardyan) (2024)
- Hayerov (2025)
- Im Davit (2025)
- Acherd (feat. Diana Harutyunyan) (2025)
