= Araz Dare =

Iranian-Armenian singer, musician

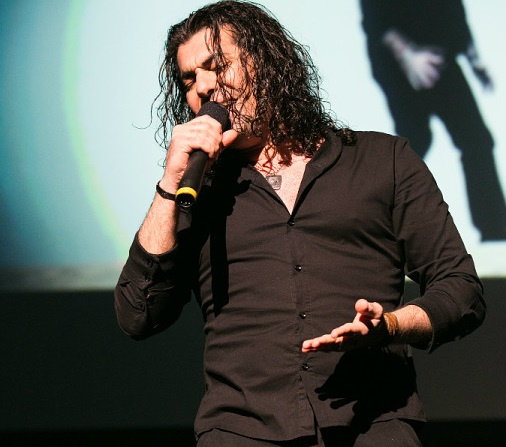
- Born: Araz Torosian; 14 January 1975 (age 51); Tehran, Iran
- Other name: Araz Torosian
- Years active: 1997–present
- Awards: Armenian Music Awards 2007

Araz Torosian (Armenian: Արազ Թորոսյան, born January 14, 1975) with the stage name Araz Dare, is an Armenian-Iranian singer, composer and music producer.

== Biography ==
He graduated from the State Conservatory of Armenia. Torosian is an activist and has produced and published works in support of the Armenian genocide and the survivors of the Azerbaijan earthquake. He won the best music duet with Armine Nahapetyan at the Armenian Music Awards in 2007.
