= Adiss Harmandian =

Lebanese-Armenian pop singer (1945–2019)

- Also known as: Adiss Harmandian
- Born: Avedis Harmandian; January 14, 1945; Beirut, Lebanon
- Died: September 1, 2019 (aged 74) Santa Monica, California, U.S.
- Genres: Traditional, pop
- Occupations: Singer-songwriter, composer
- Instrument: Vocals
- Years active: 1960s-2019

Adiss Harmandian (Armenian: Ադիս Հարմանդյան; Western Armenian: Ատիս Հարմանտեան; 14 January 1945 – 1 September 2019) was a Lebanese-Armenian pop singer.

== Early life ==
Adiss Harmandian was born Avedis Harmandian on 14 January 1945 in Beirut, Lebanon to parents who were Armenian genocide survivors. His stage name Adiss is a derivative of his given name.

== Career ==
His career began in the 1960s, and his first single was the song "Dzaghigner" (Armenian: Ծաղիկներ, meaning "Flowers"), which quickly gained popularity among Lebanese and diaspora Armenians. Harmandian is considered a pioneer of the estradayin genre of Armenian music. Songs in the genre, such as Harmandian's own "Nouné" (Armenian: Նունէ) or "Karoun Karoun" (Armenian: Գարուն գարուն, meaning "Spring, Spring") are primarily sung in Armenian, and were influential in the formation of Armenian identity in Lebanon, the Middle East and throughout the Armenian diaspora.

Harmandian has released 40 albums and around 400 songs and has received numerous awards, both abroad and in Armenia. During the Lebanese Civil War, Harmandian emigrated to the United States and resided in Los Angeles, California. He became one of the most influential figures in Armenian music and a pioneer in the estradayin musical genre.

His efforts countered foreign influences during challenging times and strengthened Armenian identity within the diaspora. His musical legacy has had a lasting impact, influencing generations of Armenian artists.

Throughout his career, Harmandian received numerous awards and accolades in recognition of his significant contributions to Armenian culture. In 2005, he was awarded the prestigious St. Mesrop Mashtots Medal by the Armenian Catholicosate of Cilicia. That same year, he also received a Lifetime Achievement Award from the Armenian Music Awards, honoring his lifelong dedication to promoting Armenian music and heritage.

== Death ==
Adiss Harmandian died on 1 September 2019 at the age of 74 at the UCLA Medical Center in Santa Monica, after a long 15-year fight with cancer.
