= Zartir lao =

"Զարթի՛ր, լաօ/լաո"

Song
- Language: Armenian
- English title: Zartir lao
- Written: Fahrat
- Published: 1890s
- Songwriter: See text

"Zartir lao" (Armenian: Զարթի՛ր, լաօ) is a popular Armenian revolutionary folk song. Composed in the 1890s, it praises the prominent fedayi leader Arabo and is a wake up call for Armenian liberation supporters against the Turk-branch of the Ottoman Army.

== Origin ==
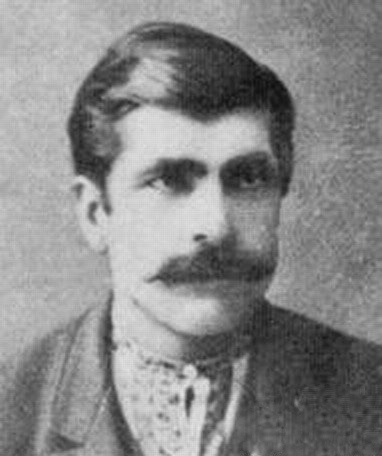
Arabo, the hero of Zartir lao.

The song was originally written by Fahrat, an Armenian ashugh from Mush. The song's hero is Arabo, the famed fedayi, who is now presented as a symbol of the Armenian liberation movement. He mainly operated in Mush Plain and Sasun. In 1893, while returning from the Caucasus, his group was surrounded in a gorge near Bulanikh. Everyone in his group was killed, including Arabo himself.

Over time its connection to Arabo's death was forgotten. This was traced in the evolution of the song's title: "Arabo's song" («Արաբոյի երգ»), "Brave Arabo's song" («Քաջ Արաբոյի երգ»), "Mshetsi's song" («Մշեցու երգ»), "Zartir lao" («Զարթիր լաօ»), etc.

== Composition ==
The song is stylistically similar to other traditional Armenian lullabies, but with the purpose of a wake up call. The mother is the central character. She tells her son about the miserable conditions of Armenians and calls him to a military struggle against the genocidal Turks. The mother points out Arabo as an example for her son to enlist as a fedayi (resistance fighter) for the liberation of Armenia. The song's tone is revealed with the doublet line «զարթիր լաօ, մեռնիմ քեզի» ("Arise my child, I beseech you"; literally Arise my child, I will die for you), which is a call for struggle to all Armenians.

== Recorded versions ==
External videos
- KOHAR - Zartir, Lao - All Time Armenian Favorites on YouTube
- 23 January 2012, a group of Armenians sings "Zartir lao" in front of the French Senate, after it passed the genocide law on YouTube

- Hovhannes Shahbazyan (2004)
- KOHAR Symphony Orchestra and Choir (2008) video

== In popular culture ==
- The song appears in 1967 film Triangle, directed by Henrik Malyan. Triangle is a story which takes place in Leninakan during World War II, and "Zartir lao" is used as a call to fight against Nazi Germany.
- During the 2013 Armenian anti-government protests opposition MP Zaruhi Postanjyan sang the song in front of the Presidential Palace in Yerevan.

== Lyrics ==
Mush (Moush), now Muş in modern Turkey

This one is the most common version of the song's lyrics in Armenian, its transliteration and the English translation:

Armenian	Latin transcription	English translation
Խուժան ասկեար զօրք է ժողուեր Եկեր Մշոյ դաշտն է պատեր։ Սուլթան կ՚ուզէ ջնջել մզի. Զարթի՛ր, լաօ, մռնիմ քզի։ Խեղճ մշեցին մեռաւ լալով, Օտար երկիրներ ման գալով Մեռաւ թուրքի պարտքը տալով. Զարթի՛ր, լաօ, մռնիմ քզի։ Ի՞նչ անիծեմ թուրք ասկեարին, Որ սպաննեց ջոջ Աբոյին։ Մեր յոյս թողեց օրօրոցին. Զարթի՛ր, լաօ, մռնիմ քզի։	Khuzhan askyar zork e zhoghver Yeker msho dashtn e pater. Sultan k'uze jnjel mzi; Zartir, lao, mrnim kzi. Kheghch mshetsin merav lalov, Otar yerkirner man galov Merav turkin harkê talov; Zartir, lao, mrnim kzi. Inch anitsem turk askyarin, Vor êspanets joj Aboyin. Mer huys toghets ororotsin; Zartir, lao, mrnim kzi.	The a couple of soldiers have been gathered And have besieged the region of Moush. The sultan wants to annihilate us; Arise, my child, I beseech you. The poor Moushetsi died grieving [for his lands], As he traveled through foreign territories He died exacting retribution to the Turks; Arise, my child, I beseech you. In what way to curse the Turk soldier, Who killed our resistance fighter Arabo. And left our hopes [of freedom] to next generation; Arise, my child, I beseech you.

=== Other variants ===
Many variants of the song exist nowadays.

==== «Քաջ Արաբոյի երգը» ====
Գրող տանի քուրդ Հասոյին,
Սպաներ է ջոջ Ափոյին,
Իլլաջ մացեր Արաբոյին,
Զարթի՛ր լաո, մըռնիմ քըզի:

Չուր ե՞րբ մնամ էլու դռներ,
Էրթամ գտնեմ զիմ խեղճ գառներ,
Ջրեմ զիմ բոսընի ծառներ,
Զարթիր՛ լաո, մըռնիմ քըզի:

Դեն իրիշկե գալող ո՞րն է,
Քաջ Արաբո բաղդավորն է,
Կարմիր իրցանց զինվոր է,
Զարթի՛ր լաո, մըռնիմ քըզի:

Խեղճ մշեցին մեռավ լալով,
Հեռու երկրներ ման գալով,
Մեռավ թուրքի պարտքեր տալով.
Զարթիր՛ լաո, մըռնիմ քըզի:

Ելեք կայնե՛ք, կտրիճ Խերան,
Ոտով գացե՛ք առաջ ուրան,
Սալլաթ Մեհրու բաժին խուրբան,
Զարթի՛ր լաո, մըռնիմ քըզի:

Սեֆի՛լ, շիվար մացած ձագեր,
Էղած անտեր, բնավեր խ(հ)ավքեր,
Տե՛ր դու փրկե, պահե ճըժեր,
Զարթի՛ր լաո, մըռնիմ քըզի:

==== «Մշեցու երգը» ====
Չուր ե՞րբ մնանք զէլու դռներ,
Երթամ գտնիմ զիմ խեղճ գառներ,
Սուքեմ զիմ պախչայիս ծառներ,
Զարթի՛ր լաո, մռնիմ քզի:

Խըղք (Խեղճ) մշեցին մեռավ լալով,
Օտար երկրներ ման գալով,
Մեռավ թուրքի պարտքը տալով,
Զարթի՛ր լաո, մռնիմ քզի:

Գրող տանի քուրդ Հատոյին,
Որ չսպաններ ջոջ Ափոյին,
Իլաճ մացեր Արաբոին,
Զարթի՛ր լաո, մռնիմ քզի:

Դեն իրիշկե՝ գալող ո՞րն ա,
Քաջ Արաբո բաղդավորն ա,
Կարմիր իրիցանց զինվորն ա,
Զարթի՛ր լաո, մռնիմ քզի:

==== «Մշեցու մոր օրորոցային երգը» ====
Խուժան ասկեր զգեզ պաշարե,
Մոր ու մանկան ծեռվին կապե,
Մըգա գիկա սըրե մըզի,
Զարթնիր, լաո, մեռնիմ քեզի:

Էլի վերունք թվանք, զոռվել,
Հըդ թուրքերուն կուզիմ կռվել,
Սուլթան կուզե ջնջը մըզի,
Զարթնիր, լաո, մեռնիմ քըզի:

Ի՞նչ անիծեմ թուրք ըսկարին,
Որ ըսպանեց մեծ Ապոյին,
Զմըր հուս թողեց վըր օրորոցին,
Զարթնիր, լաո, մեռնիմ քըզի:

Խեղճ մշեցին մեռավ լալով:
Օտար երկրներ ման գալով,
Մեռավ խըլխի պարտքը տալով,
Զարթնիր, լաո, մեռնիմ քըզի:

Չուր ե՞րբ մնամ էլու դռներ,
Էրթամ գըտնիմ զիմ խեղճ գառներ,
Զուքիմ զոիմ բախչան ու ծառներ,
Զաթնիր, լաո, մեռնիմ քըզի:

==== «Մշեցու երգը» ====
Խեղճ մշեցիք մնացին լալով,
Երկրե-երկիր ման գալով,
Մեռան թուրքին հարկը տալով,
Զարթնի՛ր, լաո, մեռնիմ քեզի:

Զարթնի՛ր, զարթնի՛ր, գնա Սասուն,
Գնա Սասուն, օգնե հայուն:

Բոբիկ ոտքով չուր Ախթամար,
Ելնեմ երթամ հայու համար,
Ձեր օգնական սուրբ տիրամայր,
Զարթնի՛ր, լաո, մեռնիմ քեզի:

Գրողը տանի քուրդ Հասոյին,
Որ սպանել է ջոջ Ափոյին,
Էլ ճար չմնաց Արաբոյին,
Զարթնի՛ր, լաո, մեռնիմ քեզի,

Զարթնի՛ր, զարթնի՛ր, գնա Սասուն,
Գնա Սասուն, օգնե հայուն:

== See also ==
- Armenian revolutionary songs
