= Armenian revolutionary songs =

Armenian revolutionary songs (Note: Armenian: Հայ յեղափոխական երգեր, romanized: Hay yeghaphokhakan yerger, pronounced [hɑj jɛʁɑpʰɔχɑˈkɑn jɛɾˈɡɛɾ]) are patriotic songs that promote Armenian patriotism. The origins of these songs lay largely in the late nineteenth and early twentieth centuries, when Armenian political parties were established to struggle for the political and civil rights of Armenians living in the Ottoman Empire.

== History ==
The Armenian revolutionary movement, initially led by the Social Democrat Hunchakian Party (est. 1887) and the Armenian Revolutionary Federation (est. 1890), took place in the late nineteenth and early twentieth centuries. This was caused by years of oppression from the Ottoman Empire, especially under the rule of sultan Abdul Hamid II. This was the period when Armenians began demanding their most basic rights and defending Armenian towns from Ottoman oppression. Certain armed Armenian patriotic groups formed to fight the Turkish oppression and defend Armenian towns from Kurdish brigands. These volunteer fighters were called fedayees. In some instances, they were successful in defending Armenian locals, earning them popular support and elevating them to the status of heroes. This environment was thus ideal for the development of Armenian patriotic songs to support these freedom fighters.

== Meaning ==
Some of the songs tell the stories of individual fedayees, such as Serob Pasha and General Andranik, who confronted the Turkish onslaught. They also talk about historical battles, successful guerrilla operations, heroic deaths, and genocide, among other sensitive topics.

The songs are generally heard at Armenian gatherings. It is also seen as a way to educate the newer generation of Armenians about their history through the songs.

Armenian revolutionary songs are very popular among the youth of the Armenian diaspora.

== List ==
Below is a list of several well-known Armenian songs. Popular current singers of these include Karnig Sarkissian, George Tutunjian, Nersik Ispiryan, Harout Pamboukjian,

Note that the English transcription of their Armenian names has been carried out in the Eastern Armenian dialect.

Original name	Transcription	Translation	Lyrics	Music	Date	Performed by	Note
Հայ քաջեր	Hay qajer	"Armenian Braves"	Nersik Ispiryan	Nersik Ispiryan		Harout Pamboukjian, Nersik Ispiryan, Heda Hamzatova	
Հասնինք Սասուն	Hasninq Sasun	"We'll Get to Sasun"				Harout Pamboukjian	
Պիտի գնանք	Piti gnanq	"We Must Go"				Nersik Ispiryan	
Դաշնակ Դրո	Dashnak Dro	"ARF Member Dro"				Hrant & Gayane	Dedicated to Drastamat Kanayan (Dro)
Ձայն տուր ով ֆիդա	Dzayn tur ov fida	"Speak Up, Fedayi"				Sahak Sahakyan	
Քաջ Նժդեհ	Qaj Nzhdeh	"Brave Nzhdeh"				Nersik Ispiryan	Dedicated to Garegin Nzhdeh
Գևորգ Չավուշի հիշատակին	Gevorg Chavushi hishatakin	"In Memory of Chavush"				Nersik Ispiryan	Dedicated to the memory of Kevork Chavush
Հայ ֆիդայիք	Hay fedayiq	"Armenian Fedayees"				Harout Pamboukjian	Dedicated to the Battle of Holy Apostles Monastery, 1901
Գինի լից	Gini lits	"Pour Wine"					Dedicated to the assassination of Talaat Pasha, one of the top men responsible for the Armenian genocide, by Soghomon Tehlirian
Ախպերս ու ես	Akhpers u Yes	"My brother and I"					
Կովկասի քաջեր	Kovkasi qajer	"Caucasian Braves"					
Արյունոտ դրոշ	Aryunot drosh	"Bloody Flag"					
Գետաշեն	Getashen	"Getashen"					
Լեռան լանջին	Leran lanjin	"On the Mountain Slope"					
Մեր Հայրենիք	Mer Hayreniq	"Our Fatherland"					The national anthem of Armenia
Զարթի՛ր, լաօ	Zarthir lao	"Wake Up, My Dear"					
Զեյթունցիներ	Zeythuntsiner	"Folks of Zeytun"					
Ադանայի կոտորածը	Adanayi godoradzuh	"The Adana Massacre"					
Աքսորի երգը	Aqsori Yerkuh	"The Refugee Song"					
Պանք Օթօմանի գրաւումը	Banq Othomani gravume	"Bank Ottoman Takeover"					Dedicated to the 1896 Ottoman Bank Takeover
Լիսբոն 5 տղոց երգը	Lisbon 5 Dghots Yerkuh						
Մենք անկեղծ զինուոր ենք	Menq Angeghdz Zinvor Yenq	"We Are Sincere Soldiers"					
Սերոբ Փաշայի երգը	Serop Phashayi Yerkuh	"The Song of Serop Pasha"					Dedicated to Aghbiur Serob
Ձայն մը հնչեց Էրզըրումի հայոց լեռներէն	Dzayn Muh Hnchets Erzërumi Hayots Lerneren	"A Call Sounded from the Armenian Peaks of Erzerum"					
Ով որ քաջ է	Ov vor qaj e	"Who Is Brave"				Sahak Sahakyan, Karnig Sarkissian	Dedicated to Aghbiur Serob
Հիմի է՛լ լռենք	Hima el lrenq	"Be Silent now!"	Raphael Patkanian			Sahak Sahakyan	
Ազատության Սիրույն Համար	Azatuthyan Siruyn Hamar	"For Beautiful Freedom"				Hovhannes Badalyan, Armen Guirag	
Տալվորիկ	Dalvorik	"Dalvorik"	Mihran Damadian			Armen Guirag, Hovhannes Badalyan, Nersik Ispiryan, Hayrik Muradyan	Dedicated to the 1904 Sasun uprising and the last stand at Talvorik Valley
Եփրեմ Խանի Երգը	Yephrem Khani Yeruh	"The Song of Yeprem Khan"					Dedicated to Yeprem Khan
Իբրև Արծիվ	Ibrev Artziv	"As an Eagle"				Karnig Sarkissian, Hovhannes Badalyan, Ara Guiragossian	Dedicated to Andranik
Դաշնակցական Խումբ	Dashnaktsakan Khumb	"Dashnak Group"				Karnig Sarkissian	
Արազի Ափին	Arazi Aphin	"On the Aras Banks"				Ara Guiragossian, Karnig Sarkissian	Dedicated to Garegin Nzhdeh
Դարձյալ Փայլեց	Dardzyal Phaylets	"Shoned Again"					Dedicated to Hrayr Dzhoghk
Ախ Վասպուրական	Akh Vaspurakan	"Oh, Vaspurakan"				Armen Guirag	
Բամբ Որոտան	Bamb Vorotan		Ghevont Alishan			Hovhannes Badalyan, Ara Guiragossian	

== See also ==
- Armenian genocide
- Armenian national awakening in the Ottoman Empire
- Timeline of Armenian national movement
- Hamidian Massacres
