= Ceinture noire =

Studio album by Gims
- Released: 23 March 2018; 24 August 2018 (Integral); 26 April 2019 (Transcendance); 6 December 2019 (Décennie)
- Recorded: 2017–2019
- Genre: Hip hop; pop; variety
- Label: TF1 Group, Play Two, Sony Music, Chahawat

Gims chronology
Mon cœur avait raison (2015)	Ceinture noire (2018)	Le fléau (2020)

Singles from Ceinture noire
- 1. "Caméléon" Released: 10 November 2017; 2. "Mi Gna" Released: 19 January 2018; 3. "La même" Released: 9 March 2018; 4. "Loup-garou" Released: 9 March 2018; 5. "Bella ciao" Released: 1 June 2018; 6. "Corazón" Released: 29 June 2018; 7. "Oulala" Released: 20 July 2018; 8. "Lo mismo" Released: 24 August 2018; 9. "Le pire" Released: 26 October 2018; 10. "Tu ne le vois pas" Released: 12 December 2018; 11. "Malheur, malheur" Released: 1 May 2020

Ceinture noire (English: Black Belt) is the third studio album by Congolese-French singer and rapper Gims, released on 23 March 2018 on the TF1 Group and Play Two labels.

The album has been reissued several times: the full version was released on 24 August 2018, the Transcendence reissue was released on 26 April 2019 and a new reissue Décennie with 4 new titles was released on 6 December 2019.

== Genesis ==
Following the election of Donald Trump in the United States on 8 November 2016, Gims expresses his anger on Instagram by announcing that he will stop music the next day, a very marked April Fool's Day a few hours later, by the announcement of his next album titled Ceinture noire.

Following a clash against Dawala for low copyright in December 2016, Gims left the Wati B label and signed with TF1 Group, his next album was announced to be under the Play Two label.

== History ==
On 7 May 2017, shortly after his official announcement, Gims published an exclusive excerpt from a song on his Instagram account entitled "Marabout" where he is heard settling accounts with a particular person. The sound with the entire clip (produced by Daylight Productions) was officially released on his new YouTube channel on 12 May 2017. On 26 May Gims released a new single titled "Ana Fi Dar", which featured the Gims of the time, very " kicker ". Note that part of the sound was unveiled on 28 March 2017 on his Snapchat account.

After a hack of his Twitter account on 7 March 2018, the pirate unveils two tracks from the album which are The Same in duet with Vianney as well as "Loup-garou" with Sofiane. These two tracks seem to be a foretaste of the album given that he announced on 29 September 2017 on these social networks that he was absent to "refine" the first single from the album which means that "Marabout" and "Ana Fi Dar" are not singles. The first is unpublished and the second is included in the project. : "I'm going to be away from the networks for a while, a few weeks, just enough time to refine, to finish the first single from the album".

He made his comeback on 5 November 2017 by changing the profile photos of all his social networks to choose a totally black image, referring to the name of the album, and announced on 7 November the release of the first single from the album, titled Chameleon, released 3 days later, on 10 November 2017. During an interview given in October 2017, a question was asked about the presence of a featuring with his little brother Dadju on the album, given that he was present on the last 2. Question to which he replies: "Yes, most certainly, as in all the previous albums, it is natural".

== Reception ==
=== Commercial reception ===
The album went directly to number one of the top merged album in France with 81,382 units (including 49,299 sales and 32,083 sales equivalents). The second week, the album remained at the top of sales (streaming included) with 60,457 units (including 36,700 physical and digital sales). During its 3rd week, the album counted 41,086 units (including 22,700 physical and digital sales), once again remaining in first place in the merged top. In the 4th week, it remained in the lead with 32,598 units (including 16,250 physical sales and downloads). At almost a month of operation, it totaled 215,522 units (including 124,000 physical and digital sales) in this country, equivalent to 2 x Platinum certification. During its 5th week of operation, it remained number one on the top album with 22,057 units (including 11,200 sales). During the following week, it remained number one with 20,929 units (11,300 physical and digital sales). In its 7th week, it remains number one with 19,608 units (including 10,000 physical and digital sales). The 8th week, it remains number one with 16,227 units (including 8,200 physical and digital sales). In his 9th week, he remains first with 16,096 units. It is certified 3 x Platinum for 310,439 units. In the 10th week, he dropped to second place in the top merged with 15,841 units, behind Bendero de Moha La Squale. The following week, it climbed back to 1st place with 13,815 other units. In his 11th week, he reached 14,568 additional units and retained pole position. For its 12th week, it descends to 2nd place with 12,174 units, behind the new album by Belgian rapper Damso, entitled Lithopédion. Note that there are 9 non-consecutive weeks in the first place of the best sales (physical and digital). By mid-year, it reached over 380,000 units including streaming.

On October 10, 2018, the album was certified as a diamond disc, with 500,000 copies sold in just 6 months of operation. At the beginning of January 2019, it exceeded 600,000 copies sold, making it the second best-selling album of 2018 behind Johnny Hallyday, Mon pays c'est l'amour, and ahead of Dadju's Gentleman 2.0. The album entered pole position in Wallonia. 1st place remains for 7 consecutive weeks before dropping to 2nd place. The following week, he climbs back to first place. He entered Flanders 28th.

== Track listing ==
CD1
No.	Title	Writer(s)	Producer(s)	Length
1.	"Intro"	Gims	Gims; Renaud Rebillaud	1:10
2.	"Tant pis"	Gims; H Magnum	Gims; Renaud Rebillaud	3:49
3.	"Caméléon"	Gims; Vitaa; H Magnum	Gims; Renaud Rebillaud	3:59
4.	"Fuegolando"	Gims	Gims; Renaud Rebillaud	3:01
5.	"La même" (feat. Vianney)	Gims; Vianney	Gims; Vianney; Renaud Rebillaud	3:20
6.	"Loup-garou" (feat. Sofiane)	Gims; Sofiane	Gims; Bugatti Beatz; Renaud Rebillaud	3:58
7.	"Entre nous c'est mort"	Gims	Gims; Bugatti Beatz; Renaud Rebillaud	3:38
8.	"Laissez-moi tranquille"	Gims; H Magnum	Gims; SoFly and Nius	3:28
9.	"Mi Gna" (feat. Super Sako and Hayko)	Gims; Sarkis Balasanyan; Artak Aramyan; Araik Mouradian	Super Sako	3:35
10.	"Tu reviendras"	Gims; H Magnum	Gims; Renaud Rebillaud	3:29
11.	"Nos valeurs"	Gims; Dany Synthé	Gims; Dany Synthé	3:56
12.	"Tu ne le vois pas" (feat. Dadju)	Gims; Dadju	Gims; Bugatti Beatz; Renaud Rebillaud	4:22
13.	"Merci Maman"	Gims	Gims; Dany Synthé; Nick BZ	2:55
14.	"T'es partie"	Gims; H Magnum	Gims; Renaud Rebillaud	3:57
15.	"Tu m'as dit" (feat. Bedjik)	Gims; Bedjik; H Magnum	Gims; Bugatti Beatz; Renaud Rebillaud	3:35
16.	"Oulala"	Gims; H Magnum	Gims; SoFly and Nius	3:01
17.	"Bonita"	Gims; H Magnum	Gims; Renaud Rebillaud	3:34

CD2
No.	Title	Writer(s)	Producer(s)	Length
18.	"Le pire"	Gims; H Magnum	Gims; Renaud Rebillaud	3:48
19.	"Où aller"	Gims; H Magnum	Gims; Renaud Rebillaud	3:56
20.	"Tu m'as mis dans la merde"	Gims; H Magnum	Gims; Dany Synthé; Renaud Rebillaud	3:52
21.	"Anakin"	Gims	Gims; Bugatti Beatz	3:25
22.	"Malheur, malheur"	Gims	Gims; Renaud Rebillaud	3:22
23.	"Mon cœur meurtri"	Gims; H Magnum	Gims; Double X	3:14
24.	"Gunshot"	Gims	Gims; Double X	3:03
25.	"La nuit c'est fait pour dormir" (feat. Orelsan and H Magnum)	Gims; Orelsan; H Magnum	Gims; Bugatti Beatz; Renaud Rebillaud	4:24
26.	"Tu me l'avais promis"	Gims; H Magnum	Gims; Joa Touch	4:30
27.	"Corazón"	Gims; H Magnum	Gims; Renaud Rebillaud	3:46
28.	"Ana Fi Dar"	Gims; Adja Dante	Adja Dante; Bugatti Beatz	3:21
29.	"Skyfall"	Gims; H Magnum	Gims; Renaud Rebillaud	3:35
30.	"60%"	Gims	Gims; Yelatif Beatz	3:49
31.	"Je n'ai rien promis"	Gims	Gims; Renaud Rebillaud	3:57

Bonus 1er dan
No.	Title	Writer(s)	Producer(s)	Length
32.	": Corazón (Remix); " (feat. Lil Wayne)	Gims; Lil Wayne; H Magnum	Gims; Renaud Rebillaud	3:46
33.	"Appelez la police" (feat. MHD)	Gims; MHD	Gims; Trackstorm; DJ Assad	3:17
34.	"Caméléon (Remix)" (feat. Quincy)	Gims; Quincy; Vitaa; H Magnum	Gims; Renaud Rebillaud	3:26

Bonus 2ème dan
No.	Title	Writer(s)	Producer(s)	Length
35.	"PS"	Gims; H Magnum	Gims; Bugatti Beatz; Renaud Rebillaud	4:11
36.	"Chien de la casse"	Gims	Gims; Bugatti Beatz; Renaud Rebillaud	2:44
37.	"Je t'en veux"	Gims; H Magnum	Gims; Double X	3:11

Bonus 3ème dan
No.	Title	Writer(s)	Producer(s)	Length
38.	"Everytime"	Gims	Gims; Renaud Rebillaud	3:15
39.	"La vérité"	Gims; H Magnum	Gims; Rim's	3:12
40.	"Les roses ont des épines"	Gims	Gims; Dany Synthé	3:41

Intégrale
No.	Title	Writer(s)	Producer(s)	Length
1.	"Corazón (Remix)" (feat. Lil Wayne and French Montana)	Gims; Lil Wayne; French Montana	Gims; Renaud Rebillaud	3:47
2.	"Lo Mismo" (feat. Álvaro Soler)	Gims; Álvaro Soler	Gims; Renaud Rebillaud	3:20
3.	"Bella Ciao" (Naestro feat. Vitaa, Dadju and Slimane)	Gims; Vitaa; Dadju; Slimane; Naestro	Naestro	2:58
4.	"Christophe" (feat. Orelsan)	Gims; Orelsan	Orelsan; Phazz; Skread	2:46

=== Rééditions ===
Transcendance
No.	Title	Writer(s)	Producer(s)	Length
1.	"Hola Señorita (Maria)" (feat. Maluma)	Gims; Maluma	Renaud Rebillaud	3:26
2.	"Pirate" (feat. J Balvin)	Gims; J Balvin	SoFly and Nius	2:42
3.	"En secret" (feat. Vitaa)	Gims; Vitaa	Renaud Rebillaud; Wisla; Bugatti Beatz	3:12
4.	"10/10" (feat. Dadju and Alonzo)	Gims; Dadju; Alonzo	Renaud Rebillaud	4:02
5.	"Le prix à payer"	Gims	Renaud Rebillaud	4:19
6.	"Jasmine"	Gims	Renaud Rebillaud	3:34
7.	"Dans la cité"	Gims	Yalatif Beatz	2:22
8.	"Miami Vice"	Gims	Gims; Renaud Rebillaud; Giancarlo Bigazzi; Bugatti Beatz; Raffaele Riefoli	3:42
9.	"Naïf"	Gims	Renaud Rebillaud	4:15
10.	"Na Lingui Yo"	Gims	Wisla; Bugatti Beatz	2:56
11.	"Je sais qui t'es"	Gims	Renaud Rebillaud; Bugatti Beatz	3:28
12.	"Reste" (feat. Sting)	Gims; Sting	Renaud Rebillaud	3:51
13.	"Very Bad Trip"	Gims	Boumidjal Double X	4:09

Décennie
No.	Title	Writer(s)	Producer(s)	Length
14.	"Comme une ombre"	Gims	Renaud Rebillaud	3:12
15.	"Mets-moi bien"	Gims	Renaud Rebillaud	3:33
16.	"Te Quiero" (with DJ Assad feat. Dhurata Dora)	Gims; Dhurata Dora; DJ Assad	Trackstorm; DJ Assad	3:15
17.	"Ceci n'est pas du rap" (feat. Niro)	Gims; Niro	Bugatti Beatz	3:37

== Charts ==
=== Weekly charts ===
Chart (2018)	Peak position
Belgian Albums (Ultratop Flanders)	28
Belgian Albums (Ultratop Wallonia)	1
Dutch Albums (Album Top 100)	93
French Albums (SNEP)	1
German Albums (Offizielle Top 100)	48
Swiss Albums (Schweizer Hitparade)	1

=== Year-end charts ===
Chart (2018)	Position
Belgian Albums (Ultratop Flanders)	153
Belgian Albums (Ultratop Wallonia)	5
French Albums (SNEP)	2
Swiss Albums (Schweizer Hitparade)	34

Chart (2019)	Position
Belgian Albums (Ultratop Wallonia)	20
French Albums (SNEP)	13
Swiss Albums (Schweizer Hitparade)	81

Chart (2020)	Position
Belgian Albums (Ultratop Wallonia)	30
French Albums (SNEP)	22

Chart (2021)	Position
Belgian Albums (Ultratop Wallonia)	73
French Albums (SNEP)	197

Chart (2025)	Position
Belgian Albums (Ultratop Wallonia)	23

== Certifications ==
Region	Certification	Certified units/sales
Belgium (BRMA)	Platinum	20,000^{‡}
France (SNEP)	3× Diamond	1,500,000^{‡}
Switzerland (IFPI Switzerland)	Gold	10,000^{‡}
^{‡} Sales+streaming figures based on certification alone.

== Release history ==
Country	Date	Label	Format	Edition
Worldwide	23 mars 2018	Chahawat; Play Two; TF1 Group; Sony Music	CD; digital download	Ceinture noire
Worldwide	24 août 2018	Chahawat; Play Two; TF1 Group; Sony Music	CD; digital download	Ceinture noire (Integral)
Worldwide	26 avril 2019	Chahawat; Play Two; TF1 Group; Sony Music	CD; digital download	Transcendance
Worldwide	6 décembre 2019	Chahawat; Play Two; TF1 Group; Sony Music	CD; digital download	Décennie
France	13 décembre 2019	Chahawat; Play Two; TF1 Group; Sony Music	Vinyl	Décennie
