= Sen Trope =

2011 single by Azis

Single by Azis

from the album Azis 2014
- English title: "Saint-Tropez"
- Released: 13 December 2011
- Genre: Chalga; folk-pop
- Length: 3:32
- Label: Diapason Records
- Composer: Martin Biolchev
- Lyricist: Vasil Boyanov

Azis singles chronology
"Mama" (2011)	"Sen Trope" (2011)	"MMA" (2012)

Music video
- "Sen Trope" on YouTube

"Sen Trope" (Bulgarian: Сен Тропе, lit. 'Saint-Tropez') is a song by Bulgarian singer Azis, released on 13 December 2011 through Diapason Records. The song achieved significant popularity throughout the Balkans, particularly within the Balkan folk-pop and club music scenes. It became one of Azis' most internationally recognized songs.

The song inspired several adaptations and cover versions in the Balkan region. Among the best-known adaptations were "Fotia me fotia" by Greek laïko singer Panos Kiamos, "Saint Tropez" by Romanian manele singer Florin Salam, and "Ona to zna" by Serbian turbo-folk singer Dragan Kojić Keba. The song's melody became widely circulated through remixes, mashups, and online videos throughout the 2010s.

== Background ==
The song was written by Azis and composed by Martin Biolchev. "Sen Trope" combines elements of Bulgarian folk-pop with contemporary dance-pop production. The track is characterized by repetitive chant-like refrains, including the phrase "A-le-le-ley", and lyrics referencing luxury tourist destinations such as Saint-Tropez, the Maldives, and Dubai.

== Music video ==
The accompanying music video, directed by Lyudmil "Lyusi" Ilarionov, for "Sen Trope" features Azis dancing and voguing while wearing high heels and revealing costumes.

== Cover versions ==
=== Panos Kiamos version ===
"Fotia me Fotia"

Single by Panos Kiamos

from the album Krystalla
- Released: July 1, 2012
- Genre: Laïko; folk-pop
- Length: 3:47
- Label: Universal Music Greece
- Composer: Martin Biolchev
- Lyricist: Nikos Vaxavanelis

Panos Kiamos singles chronology
"Krystalla" (2012)	"Fotia me Fotia" (2012)	"To Aima Mou Piso" (2012)

In 2012, Greek laïko singer Panos Kiamos covered the Azis song titled "Fotia me Fotia" (Greek: Φωτιά Με Φωτιά) for his studio album Krystalla (Greek: Κρύσταλλα).

==== Charts ====
Chart performance for "Fotia me Fotia"
Chart (2012)	Peak position
Greece Digital Songs (Billboard)	4

=== Florin Salam version ===
"Saint Tropez"

Single by Florin Salam
- Released: February 10, 2013
- Genre: Manele; folk-pop
- Length: 3:30
- Label: Big Man
- Composer: Martin Biolchev

In 2013, Romanian manele singer Florin Salam covered the Azis song titled "Saint Tropez".

=== Dragan Kojić Keba version ===
"Ona to zna"

Song by Dragan Kojić Keba

from the album Fer ubica
- Released: 2013
- Genre: folk-pop
- Length: 3:40
- Label: PGP-RTS
- Composer: Martin Biolchev
- Lyricist: Dragan Brajović Braja

In 2013, Serbian turbo-folk singer Dragan Kojić Keba covered the Azis song titled "Ona to zna" (Serbian: Она то зна) for his studio album Fer ubica (Serbian: Фер убица).

== In popular culture ==
In later years, "Sen Trope" developed a cult following online and continued circulating on social media platforms through remixes and memes.
