= Ruben Hakhverdyan =

Armenian poet, musician, and lyricist

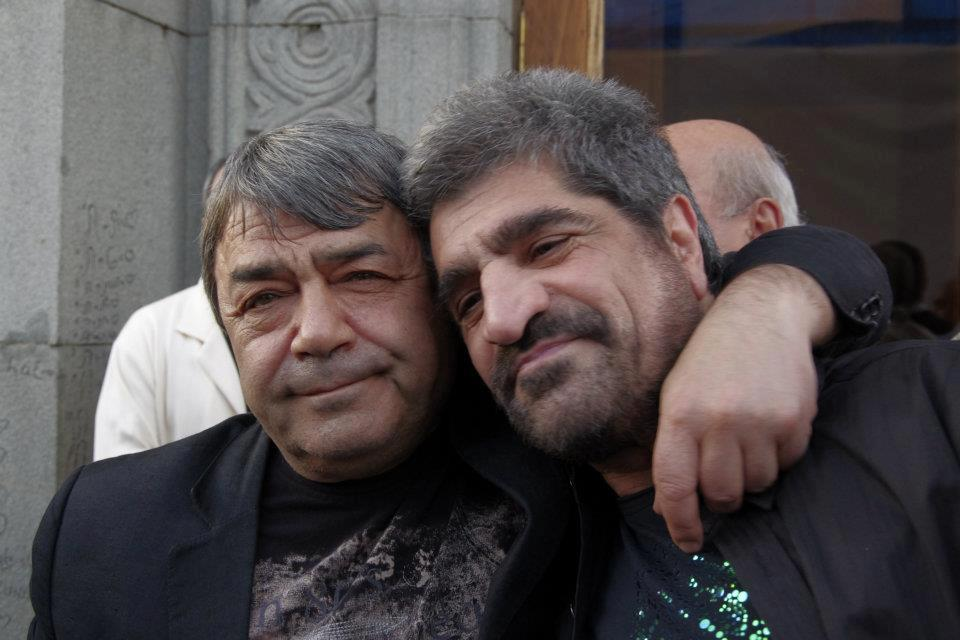
- Hakhverdyan (left) with Harout Pamboukjian at Freedom Square in 2012

Background information
- Born: December 3, 1950 (age 75); Yerevan, Armenian SSR, Soviet Union
- Instruments: Vocals guitar
- Years active: 1968—present
- Website: www.roubenhakhverdyan.net

Ruben Levoni Hakhverdyan (Armenian: Ռուբեն Լևոնի Հախվերդյան; born December 3, 1950) is an Armenian popular poet, guitarist, singer, songwriter, and lyricist. He attended Yerevan's theater institute and in 1975, earned his degree in television and theater direction.

Hakhverdyan is one of the founders of Bard music in Armenia. His songs are extremely popular and well known in Armenia, such as Navak (Armenian: Նավակ, meaning "Boat"), which is his most famous children's song, and Mer Siro Ashuny (Armenian: Մեր Սիրո աշունը, meaning "The Autumn of Our Love"), which is one of Armenia's best known romantic songs. Three songs that Hakhverdyan himself says have influenced him the most and have been his all-time favorites are Eleanor Rigby by The Beatles, Amsterdam by Jacques Brel and It's a Man's World by James Brown.

== Biography and career ==
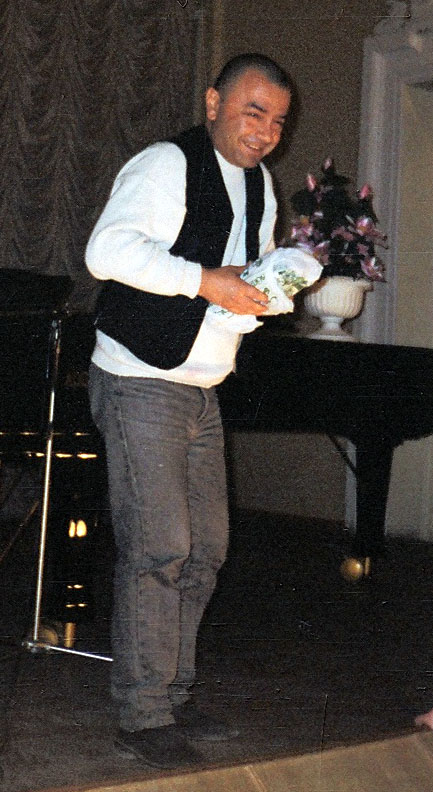
Hakhverdyan in 2006.

Ruben Hakhverdyan was born on December 3, 1950 in Yerevan, the capital of Armenia (then part of the Soviet Union), to the family of linguist and academician Levon Hakhverdyan and philologist, critic and translator Sona Ayunts. From 1969–1974 he studied and graduated from Yerevan Fine Arts and Theatre Institute. In 1971 he got a 2-month internship at the Moscow Satire Theatre in the class of Mark Zakharov. In 1968–1989 Hakhverdyan worked in the Armenian State Television Network, initially as an assistant director and later as a director.

Hakhverdyan staged plays at the Yerevan Sundukyan State Academic and at the Hrachya Ghaplanyan Drama Theatre. In 1989 Hakhverdyan left his job at the television network and acted as a free artist.

Ruben Hakhverdyan is the author of a number of CDs, the first one being "Songs of Love and Hope" issued in Paris in 1985. His best known songs include "Snow" (Armenian: Ձյունը), "The Dogs" (Armenian: Շները), "In the Nights of Yerevan" (Armenian: Երևանի գիշերներում) and many others. In 1996 he created the "My Home on the Wheels" concert-performance, as well as many children's songs.

Hakhverdyan's songs "Snow" and "Star-Spangled Night" (Armenian: Գիշերվա աստղազարդ նկարում) were used in the "Found Dream" (1976) animated cartoon, which is very popular in Armenia. In 1990 Hakhverdyan starred in Harutyun Khachatryan's "Wind of Oblivion" film and in 2009, he starred in the film "Endless Return", also by Harutyun Khachatryan.

He has performed in France, the United States, Ukraine, Yugoslavia, Italy, Lebanon, Germany, Czech Republic, Serbia, Iran, Syria, and Lebanon.

Hakhverdyan is a member of the European Party of Armenia (EPA) and was the EPA's candidate in the Yerevan Council of Elders elections in 2022.

== Discography ==
- Songs of Love and Hope (1985)
- The Best of Ruben Hakhverdyan (1985)
- Rouben, Lilit & Vahan (1989)
- Destiny (1994)
- Midnight (1997)
- This is Yerevan (1997)
- Yerke Nayev Aghotk E (2000)
- Yerg (2000)
- Anthology (2001)
- For the Children from 0 to 100 Years Old (2002)
- That Our Mountains Are Not Left Orphan (2014)
- Testament (2017)

== Filmography ==
=== Composer ===
- 1976 – Found Dream (Animated short)
- 1990 – Wind of Oblivion
- 1998 – Yerevan Blues
- 2001 – Roof to Roof
- 2014 – Seeds (Short)

=== Actor ===
- 1990 – Wind of Oblivion

== Awards ==
- Movses Khorenatsi medal, 1998.
- Armenian Music Awards - Best Alternative Folk Album (Yerg), 2001.
- Gold Medal of the Ministry of Culture, 2006.
- Ara and Maral Award by the Tekeyan Cultural Association for the album "For the Children from 0 to 100 Years Old", 2008.
