= Nersik Ispiryan =

Armenian singer (born 1963)

Nersik Ispiryan Ներսիկ Իսպիրյան
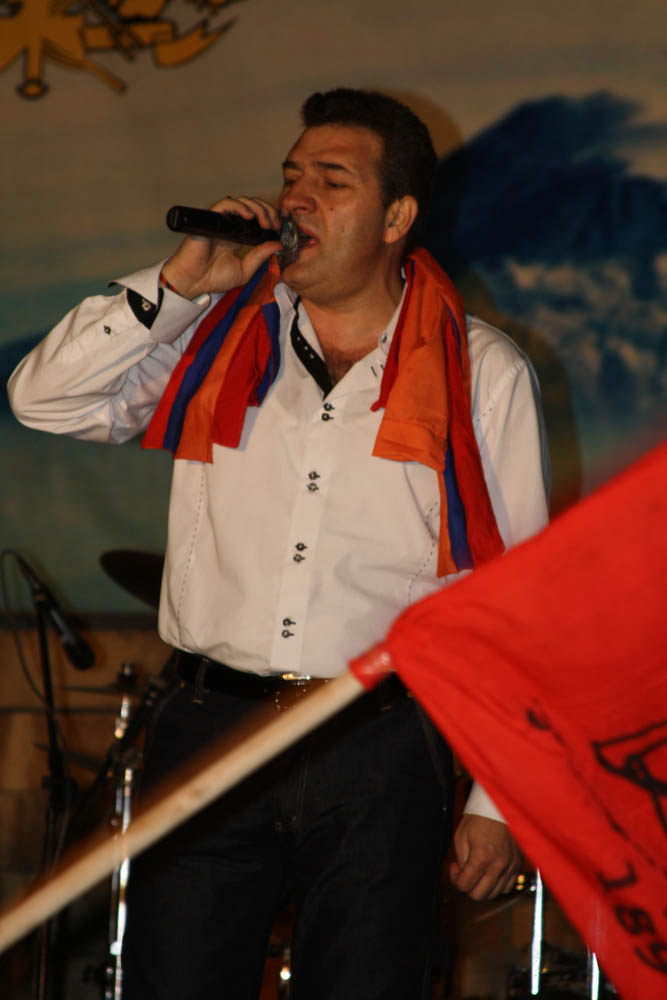
- Ispiryan in Lebanon, 2010

Background information
- Born: May 15, 1963 (age 63); Yerevan, Armenian SSR, Soviet Union
- Genres: patriotic, pop, folk
- Occupation: singer
- Instruments: Voice, zurna, dhol, duduk
- Years active: late 1980s–present

Nersik Ispiryan (Armenian: Ներսիկ Իսպիրյան, born May 15, 1963) is an Armenian singer best known for his Armenian nationalistic songs.

== Biography ==
Nersik Ispiryan was born in Yerevan, Armenian SSR, Soviet Union. He graduated from School No.160 in Erebuni district of Yerevan. He studied at Yerevan Komitas State Conservatory from 1986 to 1992, while singing in Akunk («Ակունք») folk ensemble. He moved to the United States in 1995, because of pressure from Levon Ter-Petrosyan's anti-nationalist government, against him and other pro-Dashnak figures in mid-1990s.

Ispiryan is married with three children, 2 daughters (Ashken and Ani) and 1 son (Arabo). His son is also a singer.

== Discography ==
=== Studio albums ===
- Nersik Vol 1 (1987)
- Nersik Vol 2 (1988)
- Armenian Patriotic Songs (1992)
- Armenian Country Dances (1992)
- Anmah Herosner (1995)
- Aravod Er (1995)
- Ardziv Slatsir (1997)
- Jan Jan Jan Aghchig (1997)
- Haverj Hokiner (1999)
- Moderne Dances (1999)
- Im Yerkn Ourish E (2000)
- Yergirs Kancha (2002)
- Dzyun (2004)
- Vrezh (2005)
- Goratz Ser (2007)
- Aryan Kanche (2009)
- Yergir Sassoun (2011)
- Veradardz Akunqnerin (2012)
- Sa Hayastanne U Verj (2014)
- Hay Mna (2015)
- Yergis Champan (2020)
- 60 / Live In Concert (2023)

=== Compilation albums ===
- The Best (2010)
