= Reincarnation (band) =

Armenian reggae band

- Origin: Armenia
- Genre: Reggae
- Years active: 2000–present
- Members: Roland Gasparyan; Saro Khachatryan; Edgar Ghukasyan; Hayk Manukyan; David Ogan; Harut Khachatryan; David Kirakosyan; Davit Nalchajyan
- Website: reincarnation.am

The Reincarnation Orchestra (Armenian: Ռեինկարնացիա) is an Armenian reggae band from Yerevan, initiated by vocalist Roland Gasparyan in 2000.

Over the years the band has gone through several musicians, which influenced the style by experimenting with the essentials of Armenian folk music by reinterpreting melodies from many famous artists such as Sayat-Nova and adding big influences of ska & reggae to the mix.

== History ==
In 2007, the band released their first EP titled «Janfida to Jamaica 60 km», for the first time in history blending ska and reggae beats with Armenian style melodies. The hit single «Jan Rastaman» was released later that year, gaining success in Armenia for its unique style. Reincarnation Orchestra has also been known for their strong and meaningful words in their lyrics, always describing the sheer beauty of their hometown Yerevan, as well as life, corruption, and peace.

From 2006, The Reincarnation orchestra actively started to give out concerts around in Armenia, and in some cases, small gigs in Moscow and all the way to Europe.

In 2010, the band released their first album titled «One Spoon of Love». The release of their first album gave a far wider recognition to the band in the country and as well throughout the world amongst Armenians of the diaspora. The song «A Spoon of Love» from the album of the same name was released along with a music video and became a hit single in late 2010. In 2011, they released more hit songs like «Eli Lav A» and »Sirunik Es».

In 2013, they released their second album titled «Agh u Hac» (Salt & Bread).

=== 2014-present ===
In August 2014, the band released their third album titled «Spitak». They originally broadcast the news over the internet and made the album available for free download on their website.

Since then, the band has also participated in numerous festivals and clubs in the hundreds of concerts. Roland Gasparyan is also involved in charity, carrying out various programs aimed to help orphans. In a recent interview, Roland Gasparyan commented on how he is open to changing the line up of the band because he would like to work with different musicians. On June 7, the band's first live video recording took place. The DVD includes a documentary about the group's European tour and concert recording.

In February 2022, the band released their fourth album titled «H2O», after 7 years.

== Discography ==
- Anoren (2005)
- Janfida to Jamaica 60 km (2007)
- One Spoon of Love (2010)
- Agh u Hac (2013)
- Spitak (2014)
- Best Hits (2018)
- H2O (2022)
- Sazz & Jazz (2013)
- Metseri Yerger (2024)
- Symphonic Reincarnation (Live Concert) (2024)
