= Nune Hairapetian =

Nune Hairapetian Armenian: Նունե Հայրապետյան
- Born: November 23, 1951 (age 74); Yerevan, Armenia, Soviet Union
- Origin: Soviet Union; Italy
- Genres: classical music
- Occupations: pianist, music teacher
- Instrument: piano

Nune Hairapetian (Armenian: Նունե Հայրապետյան, November 23, 1951, Yerevan, Armenia) Armenian musician, pianist, music teacher. PhD in music.

== Biography ==
Nune Hairapetian was born in Armenia, in a family of musicians, and become one of the most important artists in the cultural scene of the former Soviet Union. Nuné began her career at the age of 8, and at the age of 11 she already played the Mendelssohn Piano Concerto with Orchestra. She was then admitted into the famous music school for young talents: the Moscow Central Special School, and she continued her graduate studies at the Moscow Tchaikovsky Conservatory. In 1972 Nuné Hairapetian won the second prize of the only national competition in Soviet Union, the prestigious «Minsk Piano Competition». After the competition she began a very intense concert activity and played in all the states of Soviet Union. In the years 1972-1988 she gave an average of 40 recitals a year and played with the most important philharmonic orchestras and the most famous conductors of the Soviet States. In 1974 she graduated from Moscow Conservatory with honors and a maximum mark, in the class of the legendary Russian concert player Yakov Flier. In 1978 she obtained her PhD in music.

In 1988 Nune Hairapetian left Soviet Union and settled in Italy. From 1991 to 2003 she was regularly invited by the prestigious organization «Società dei Concerti» for several recitals and concerts with orchestra in the Grande Sale Verdi of Milan Conservatory. In 1995 Nune was invited to participate, together with Mstislav Rostropovich and other notable artists at the 43rd Ljubljana International Festival, where she played at the opening concert.

In 1991 she played a special concert «Historical Event» at the Conservatory of Milan: she played the Bach Concertos for 3 and 4 pianos and orchestra, with her mother, sister and daughter. This concert was placed very high by critics and audiences and remains to this day one of the most famous events in Italian cultural life. Nune Hairapetian has a very broad repertoire. She is especially acclaimed by critics and audiences for her interpretations of Mozart, Brahms and Russian authors: Skrjabin, Rachmaninov, Prokoffiev.

== Teaching ==
Since 1978 Nune Hayrapetyan has also been a busy teacher. In 1977 she obtained her specialization in Pedagogy at the Moscow Pedagogical Institute. In the years 1978-1988 she taught at the Specialization Institute in Music of Yerevan, being a jury member every year. In 1983 she obtained the «High Qualification» of music teacher.

Since 1988, she has taught pianists by preparing them for diplomas at the Conservatory of Milan.

Most of her students are already known as highly valued performers, and have won several national and international competitions.
