= Tigran Asatryan =

Armenian singer, Greco-Roman wrestler

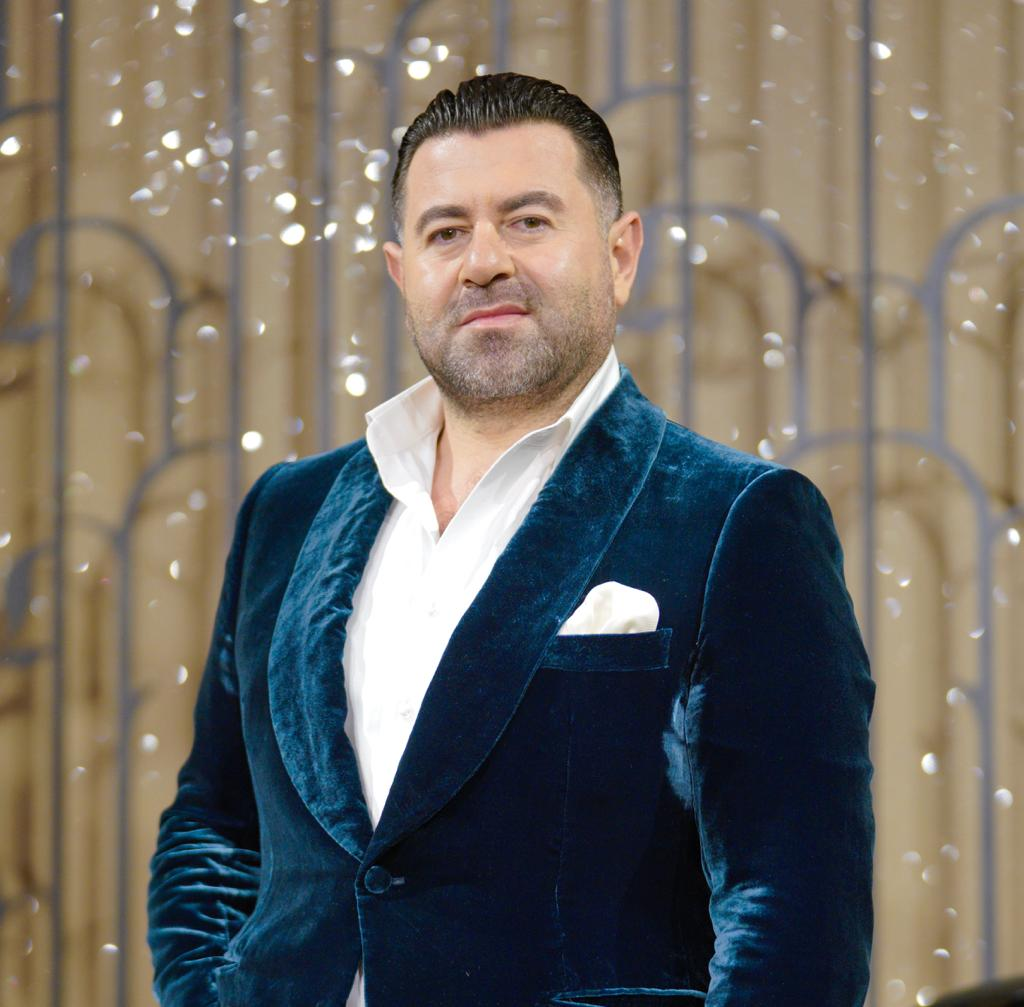

Background information
- Born: Տիգրան Ասատրյան; April 22, 1975 (age 51); Ejmiatsin, Armenian SSR, Soviet Union
- Genres: Armenian pop; rabiz
- Occupations: Singer; former Greco-Roman wrestler
- Instrument: Vocals
- Years active: 2003–present

Tigran Arami Asatryan (Armenian: Տիգրան Արամի Ասատրյան; born April 22, 1975) is an Armenian singer and son of famed singer Aram Asatryan. He is also an ex-Greco-Roman wrestler and has won the Armenian championship three times.

== Early life ==
Tigran Asatryan was born on April 22, 1975 in the city of Ejmiatsin (now known as Vagharshapat) to Aram Asatryan, who was a famous Armenian singer, and Nvart Gevorkyan. He graduated from the Khachatur Abovyan Secondary School No. 4 in Ejmiatsin. As a child, he was engaged in Greco-Roman wrestling and became the champion of Armenia three times. In 2000, he moved to the United States.

== Music career ==
Asatryan's first performance took place in 2003 at a concert dedicated to the 50th anniversary of his father, Aram Asatryan, at the Alex Theater in Glendale, California.

Asatryan's first solo concert took place on October 16, 2016 at the Dolby Theater in Hollywood.

In 2018, he released the song "Spring, Spring" (Armenian: Գարուն, գարուն) with Spitakci Hayko. It became the number one year-end song of 2018 in Armenia.

== Personal life ==
Asatryan got married in 2013 and has three children, two boys and one girl. His twin brother Setrak died in a car accident at age 30, but Asatryan has stated that he was murdered. He has another brother, Artash, who is also a singer, and a sister, Zvart. His father Aram Asatryan died soon after on November 7, 2006 at the age of 53.

== Discography ==
=== Studio albums ===
- As Long As I Stay (Armenian: Ինչքան մնամ) (2004)
- In Traces of Love (Armenian: Սիրո հետքերով) (2006)
- I Want You to Love Me (Armenian: Ուզում եմ սիրես) (2010)
- Father, Our Beloved (Armenian: Հայրիկ, դու մեր սիրելի) (feat. Artash & Grisha Asatryan) (2010)
- Time (2012)
- The Legacy Continues (2015)

=== Live Albums ===
- New Live (2010)
- Live in Concert (2017)
