= Panos Kiamos =

Greek singer (born 1975)

Panos Kiamos Πάνος Κιάμος
- Born: Παναγιώτης Κιάμος; 4 October 1975 (age 50); Athens, Greece
- Genres: Laiko, pop
- Occupation: Singer
- Instrument: Vocals
- Years active: 1993–present
- Labels: Music Box International (1999-2005); Universal Music Greece (2006-2012); Cobalt Music (2013-2025); Panik Records (2025-present)
- Website: www.panoskiamos.gr

Panos Kiamos (Greek: Πάνος Κιάμος, Greek pronunciation: [ˌpanos ˈcamos]) is a Greek laiko–pop singer.

== Early life ==
Kiamos was born on 4 October 1975 in Athens, where he spent the rest of his adolescent life. In 1994, at the age of 18, he passed the entry exams for medical school. However, it was around the same time that he discovered his interest in music, leading to his decision to reject the medical school's offer of a scholarship. He began to learn to play the guitar, and took up music theory lessons.

== Musical career ==
His early career began with appearances in major nightclubs alongside well-established names in the Greek music scene, such as Tolis Voskopoulos, Makis Christodoulopoulos, Eleni Dimou and Giorgos Alkaios.

In 1998, Kiamos released his first CD entitled Enas Erotas Latria ke Anagki, from which two songs gained popularity: Ola Ya Senane Milane (Horis Nero) and Trelos Ya Sena.

In 1999, he released his second CD Den Ise Moni. This was followed in 2000 by Tou Erota Feggaria.

In 2002, Kiamos made progress in the northern city of Thessaloniki. The songs Alithina (Truly) and Arketa (Enough) from the CD Tis Nyhtas Oniro (Dream of the Night) became popular in the north, and as a result Kiamos' stock rose considerably. The CD To Gelio Sou Klei followed a year later; by this stage, he had become a household name throughout the country.

In 2004, he released a live CD entitled Panos Kiamos Live Sto Fix, which included performances of his own work, as well as various popular hits.

In 2005, Kiamos appeared at Asteria, one of the most popular entertainment venues in Athens, with the initial 20 scheduled performances turning into 9 consecutive months (April–January).

In the summer of 2006, while still performing at Asteria, Kiamos signed a contract with Universal Music; his first collaboration with the label, Monima Erotevmenos, was released in June that year. In October, Kiamos began performing at Anodos in Piraeus. At the start of May 2007, Kiamos agreed to perform at Politeia in Thessaloniki. The CD single Metakomizo was released as a forerunner to his next full album, Gyrna Se Mena. In October, Kiamos returned to Anodos for a second series of performances.

At the start of 2008, Kiamos began a series of appearances at Pyli Axiou in Thessaloniki, before embarking on a string of performances throughout Greece, Cyprus and Germany. The completion of his touring was followed by the release of his second live CD, Oi Dikes Mas Nichtes. November saw the release of a studio album, Gia Agapi Etoimasou.

Late in 2010, he released a new album called "Tha Ziso Gia Mena" which won 4 platinum awards and a Best Song Award for "Sfiriksa kai elikses".

In April 2011, he released another hit album called "Olokainourgios", which also went on to win platinum awards and 1 award for best songs "Apo Deftera", and won the Best Music Video Award for "Olokainourgios".

On March 10, 2012, he released "Krystalla." In June, he released "To Aima Mou Piso," which became popular on Greek and North American radio stations. On July 8, 2012, he released his album Krystalla, which included a Greek reggae song and a cover of Bulgarian singer Azis's song "Sen Trope" ("Saint-Tropez"), titled "Fotia me Fotia" ("Fire with Fire").

== Personal life ==
In 2005, Kiamos met his future wife, Zacharoulla. When Kiamos was performing at a nightclub in Piraeus, after finishing his performance, Zacharoulla, a self-confessed fan of his music, went to the back door to request an autograph. Kiamos continued performing at the same club and after several encounters, they started a relationship which would remain secret until their marriage six months later.

The couple has three children together - Liana (born in 2008), and Vasilis (born in 2010). On September 1, 2011, their third child, a boy, was born.

Kiamos is a devout Greek Orthodox Christian and he often wears a rosary. Every time, he tries to take advantage of the holidays of 25 March or the local holiday of the feast of Saint St Andreas (patron saint of Patras, where he finds the opportunity to visit the homonymous temple, since his relationship with religion is very close.

== See also ==
- Panos Kiamos discography
