= Mi Gna =

2016 song by Super Sako featuring Spitakci Hayko

Single by Super Sako featuring Spitakci Hayko

from the album Love Crimes
- Released: 2016
- Recorded: 2016
- Genre: R&B, Armenian folk music
- Length: 3:37
- Songwriters: Artak Aramyan; Sarkis Balasanyan
- Producer: Super Sako

Spitakci Hayko singles chronology
"Mi Gna" (2017)

Music video
- "Mi Gna" on YouTube

"Mi Gna" (Armenian: Մի գնա, lit. 'Don't Go') is a song in Armenian and English by Armenian-American rapper Super Sako (Sarkis Balasanyan) and features vocals by the Armenian rabiz singer Spitakci Hayko (Hayk Ghevondyan). The song samples "In Da Club" by 50 Cent.

"Mi Gna" was written by Artak Aramyan with added English lyrics by Super Sako and appeared in his 2016 album Love Crimes. The song was uploaded to YouTube on August 17, 2016, and without the release of any official music video for the song, it became a huge hit in Armenia, the Armenian diaspora, Turkey, the Arab countries, and elsewhere worldwide. The video attracted 50 million views by June 2017, making it the most viewed song on YouTube by Armenian artists. The video has garnered more than 186 million views as of December 2019.

== Maître Gims Remix ==
"Mi Gna (Maître Gims Remix)"

Single by Maître Gims and Super Sako featuring Hayko

from the album Ceinture noire
- Released: 19 January 2018
- Recorded: 2017
- Genre: R&B, Popular Armenian music, dance music
- Length: 3:35
- Label: Chahawat / B1 (Sony Music)
- Songwriters: Artak Aramyan (Armenian); Sarkis Balasanyan (English); Maître Gims (French); Araik Mouradian
- Producers: Maître Gims; MG Mouradian

Maître Gims singles chronology
"Caméléon" (2017)	"Mi Gna (Maître Gims Remix)" (2018)	"Loup garou" (2018)

Super Sako singles chronology
"Mi Gna" (2018)

Music video
- "GIMS - Mi Gna ft. Super Sako, Hayko (Clip Officiel)" on YouTube

The song was covered by Congolese singer and rapper Maître Gims in a trilingual Armenian, French and English version titled "Mi Gna (Maître Gims Remix)". This version included additional French-language lyrics by Maître Gims and Araik Mouradian and was produced by Gims and MG Mouradian. The remix was released on 19 January 2018 in France. The release was accompanied by an official music video filmed in New York and Directed By Adam Nael. The video with Maître Gims version has attracted 255 million views as of August 2022.

In its first week of release in France on Chahawat / B1 labels and distributed by Sony Music, "Mi Gna (Maître Gims Remix)" entered the French Singles Chart at number 7, peaking eventually at number 4. It also reached #14 on the SNEP Telecharged Singles chart and #35 on SNEP "Top Singles - Streaming" chart. In Belgium, where the single is released by Play Two and distributed by Warner Music, it reached number 38 in the Belgian Ultratop Wallonia chart. and peaked at number 8 on Belgian Wallonia Urban Top 50 Chart. The single also charted in the Swiss Hitparade, entering at number 74.

"Mi Gna" was included in Maître Gims' 2018 album Ceinture noire that made it to the number one position on the French SNEP Albums chart, on the Swiss Hitparade Albums chart and on the Ultratop Belgian (Wallonia) Albums chart.

== Versions ==
=== Language versions ===
The song has been subject to a great number language versions including:

Language	Performer	Original title	Title English transliteration	Link
Arabic including dialects	Balti	Mi Gna	Mi Gna	link (archived)
Arabic including dialects	Maya	توحشتك آنا - Mi Gna (Cover Mashup Song)	Twahachtek Ana - Mi Gna (Cover Mashup Song)	link (archived)
Arabic including dialects	Big Shift & Dr Black	تانبغيك أنا	Tanibghik ana	link (archived)
Bulgarian	Toni Storaro and Fiki feat. Ustata	Моята жена	Moyata zhena	link (archived)
French	Maître Gims & Super Sako (feat. Hayko)	Mi Gna (Maître Gims Remix)		link (archived)
Georgian	Shai Gal	დღე არის თუ ღამეა	Dghe aris tu ghamea	link (archived)
Greek	Grigoris Markelis feat. Patro	Όσα έρθουν	Osa ertun	link (archived)
Greek	Super Sako feat. Panos Kiamos & Bo	Θέλω να σε ξαναδώ	Thelo na se xanado	link (archived)
Hebrew	Dj Avi Panel feat. Zehava Cohen	מי גנה	Mi Gna	link (archived)
Kurdish	Navid Zardi & Hardi Salami	Ishqt (ئيشقت)	Your Love	link (archived)
Romanian	Elis Armeanca feat Mr Juve	Cine e inima mea		link (archived)
Turkish	Berat Toksöz feat. Barış Koçak	Bitti Artık Bu Sevda		link (archived)
Serbian	Vanja Mijatović x Gasttozz	Скупо би те платио	Skupo bi te platio	link (archived)

There are also versions in Albanian, Assyrian, Dutch, German and Russian amongst many.

=== Samplings and adaptations ===
Armenian singer Agas released an adaptation "Nazani, Mi Gna, Sirun Kuku" sampling heavily from the song.

"Mi Gna" has also been subject to many remixes, samplings and adaptations notably by DJ Pantelis (Greece).

In 2021, the South Asian artist CAPS sampled on the song in his hit "Shoulda Never" that charted in UK's Asian Charts.

== Charts ==
=== Weekly charts ===
Chart (2017–2018)	Peak position
Belgium (Ultratop 50 Wallonia)	21
Bulgaria (ARC Top 40)	14
France (SNEP)	4
Romania (Airplay 100)	2
Switzerland (Schweizer Hitparade)	74

=== Year-end charts ===
Chart (2018)	Position
Romania (Airplay 100)	8

== Certifications ==
Region	Certification	Certified units/sales
France (SNEP) Maître Gims remix	Platinum	200,000^{‡}
^{‡} Sales+streaming figures based on certification alone.
