= Aram Asatryan =

- Born: Արամ Ասատրյան; 3 March 1953; Ejmiatsin, Armenian SSR, Soviet Union
- Died: 7 November 2006 (aged 53) Oshakan, Armenia
- Genres: Armenian pop; rabiz
- Occupations: Musician; songwriter; poet; filmmaker; actor
- Instrument: Vocals
- Years active: 1985-2006
- Labels: Parseghian Records; PE-KO Records; Star Records
- Website: Aram Asatryan on Facebook

Aram Hapeti Asatryan (Armenian: Արամ Հապետի Ասատրյան; 3 March 1953 – 7 November 2006) was an Armenian singer and songwriter of Armenian pop and rabiz music, known for his energetic concerts. He is widely regarded as the pioneer of the "rabiz" music genre and to this day remains the most popular rabiz singer of all time.

== Biography ==
Aram Asatryan was born in Ejmiatsin (now known as Vagharshapat) on 3 March 1953 to Hapet Asatryan and Ashken Mampreyan. He was born to a refugee family.

Ever since his childhood years, Asatryan was recognized as a prodigal musician. In 1985, Asatryan formed his own band. Later in life, he gained fame for his distinct voice and musical styling, and was popular both in Armenia and the international community, particularly the Armenian diaspora. Asatryan loved to work and he devoted his life to music. He approached positive things and was confident about himself. His love for his country, the Armenian people, as well as other ethnic groups are expressed in his songs. During the First Nagorno-Karabakh War, he performed songs for the soldiers and Armenians in general to generate moral support.

Asatryan performed many concerts internationally (Asia, Europe, Russia, the Middle East), and in many cities in Armenia. He wrote over 500 songs and constantly held world tours. Throughout his life, he received many awards such as the "Gusan", which he was awarded on 18 April 2003 by the Cultural Music Ministry in Armenia. The "Gusan" award is the most prestigious award offered by the Cultural Music Ministry in Armenia.

== Personal life ==
Aram Asatryan was married to Nvart Gevorkyan and they had three sons, Artash, Tigran, Setrak, and a daughter, Zvart.

Until his death, Asatryan resided in the United States. He believed his music would pass on from generation to generation. His son Setrak (Seto) died in an automobile accident approximately one year before Aram's death. His musical legacy is continued by his two sons, Tigran and Artash Asatryan, his nephew Hovhannes Asatryan, and his three grandsons, Aram, Arman, and Grisha Asatryan.

== Death ==
Aram Asatryan died on 7 November 2006 in Oshakan in the Aragatsotn region from an apparent heart attack. He was at a baptism being the godfather of an Armenian family. He did not show early symptoms of sickness as it was reported that he was in a very good and warm mood.

Dying surrounded by his close relatives, he was grieved by fans as he was considered one of the big names in Armenian pop music in modern times, and dubbed the "voice of Hayastan". The entire Asatryan family is considered to be a foremost contributor to the pop music of post-Soviet Armenia.

== Discography ==
=== Studio Albums ===
- Zhptum Es Knkush (1974)
- Ankin Yeghpayr (1984)
- Makur Sers (1985)
- Asum En Heru (1985)
- Kapuyt Trchun (1986)
- Aygepan Aghchik (1987)
- Menk Toghel Enk Hayrenike (1987)
- Mer Leninakan (1988)
- Yeraz (1988)
- Requiem: Vorkan Tsankatsa (1989)
- Mer Hayrenik (1990)
- The Best of Aram Asatryan (1991)
- Angakh Hayastan (1992)
- Music with Duduk (1993)
- Indz Hamar (1993)
- Puj Ashkhar (1993)
- Nayir Ashkharin (1994)
- Azat Hayastan (1995)
- Hay Es Du (1996)
- The Golden Album (1997)
- In Los Angeles (1998)
- Super Dance (1998)
- 10 Years on Stage (1999)
- Yet Dardzek Tariner (1999)
- 2000 (1999)
- Self Titled (2000)
- The Very Best (2000)
- Re Mi X (2000)
- Asem Te Chasem (2001)
- Im Yerke (2001)
- Skizb (2002)
- Sweet Memories: 1980-1990 | 4 CD Set (2002)
- Du Ashkhar Yekar (2003)
- Aram Asatryan & Friends: 50 Golden Years | CD & DVD (2003)
- Anunt | CD/DVD Set (2005)
- Golden Oldies (2007)
- The Legacy Continues: Bazmerang Shghtaner | 17 Songs | Special Edition & Gift CD (2024)

=== Compilations Albums ===
- The Best of Aram Asatryan (1998)
- Ergenk Mer Surb Hor Masin: Aram Asatryan, Tatoul Avoyan, Hovhannes Vardanyan, Armen Aloyan, Samvel Sahakyan (1999)
- Millennium 2000 (2001)
- The Best of Aram Asatryan 1989-2002 (2003)
- Angakh Hayastan (2004)
- My Sons: Aram Asatryan, Artash Asatryan, Tigran Asatryan (2006)
- Hayrik, Du Mer Sireli | Star Records Collection, Vol. 5: Aram Asatryan, Artash Asatryan, Tigran Asatryan, Grisho Asatryan (2010)

=== Live Albums ===
- Live: Aram Asatryan & Armen Aloyan (1998)
- Live: Happy Program, Vol. 1 (2002)
- Live: Happy Program, Vol. 2 (2002)
- Hamalir: Live Concert in Armenia | CD/DVD Set (2005)
