= Karnig Sarkissian =

Armenian singer

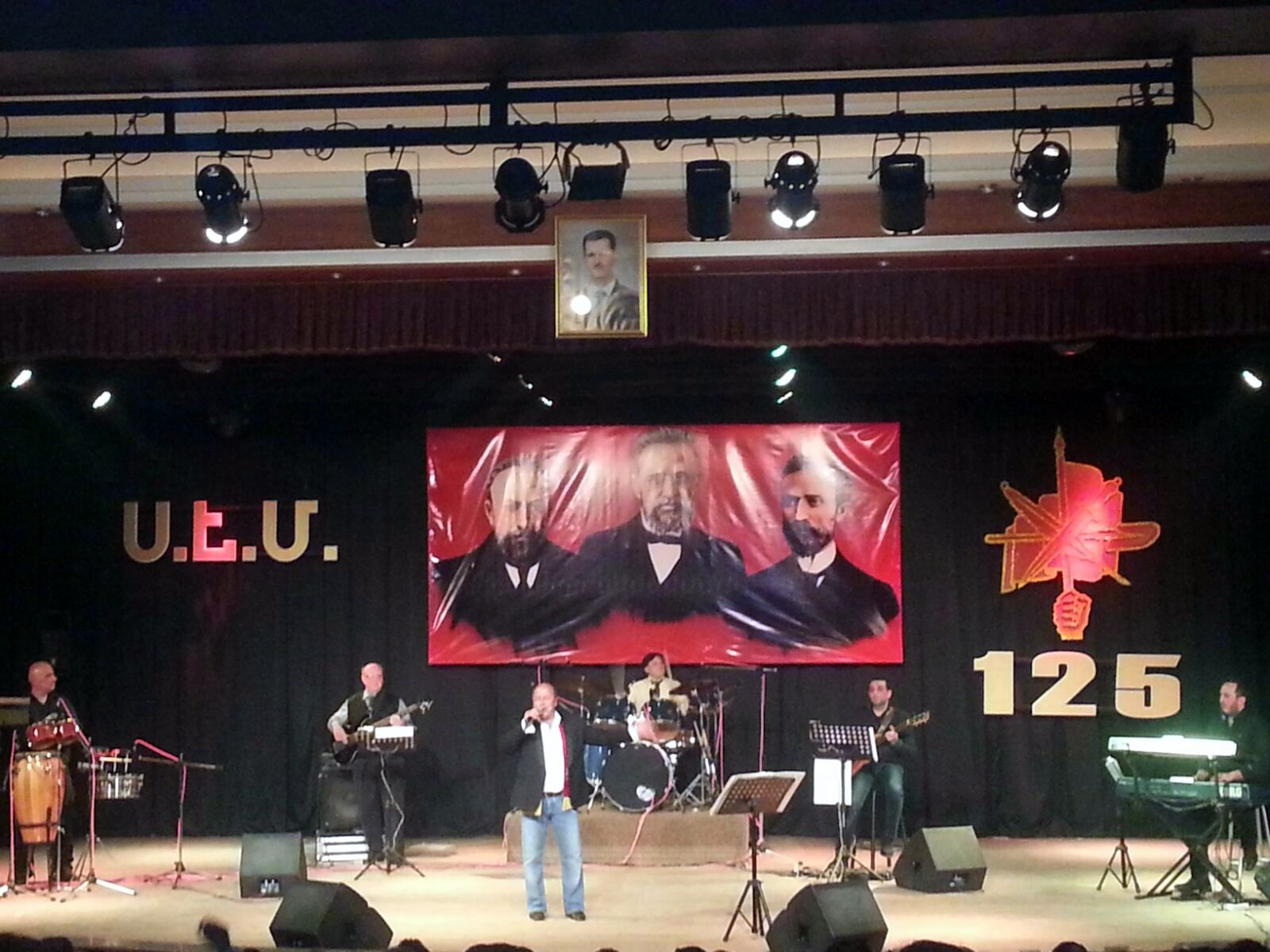
- Karnig Sarkissian performing in Aleppo, Syria, December 2015

Background information
- Born: 1953 (age 71–72); Aleppo, Syria
- Origin: Armenia
- Genres: patriotic songs
- Occupation: Singer
- Instrument: Vocals

Karnig Sarkissian (Armenian: Գառնիկ Սարգսյան; Western Armenian: Գառնիկ Սարգիսեան; born 1953) is an Armenian-American singer from Aleppo, Syria. He is best known throughout the Armenian diaspora for his performance of Armenian patriotic and revolutionary songs. He is a supporter of the Armenian Revolutionary Federation (ARF).

== Prison ==
In 1982, Sarkissian, who was resident of Anaheim, California at the time, was convicted of taking part in a plot to bomb the Turkish Consulate in Philadelphia. According to the conviction, his accomplices were Viken Vasken Yacoubian of Glendale, Vicken Archavir Sarkissian Hovsepian of Santa Monica, Dikran Sarkis Berberian of Glendale, and Steven John Dadaian of Canoga Park. They were accused of being members of the militant group Justice Commandos of the Armenian Genocide (JCAG).

His prison sentence was cut short. After his release from prison, Karnig Sarkissian resumed his artistic activity and is a popular singer in the Armenian diaspora.

== Discography ==
=== Studio albums ===
- Mayrigis (1977)
- Ho Hi Ta (1977)
- Hayotz Mardigner (1985)
- Lisbon Five (1989)
- Gharapaghi Engadznerin (1993)
- Meghavore Tashnagtsutyun (1995)
- Ezkush Kordzir Hayasdanum (1996)
- Ver Gats Joghovourt (1997)
- Heghapoghagan (1999)
- Abril 24 (1999)
- Zinial Baykar (1999)
- Lisbon 5 // Hayrigin Yerke (2004)
- Housher (2009)

=== Live Albums ===
- Live In Los Angeles (1988)
- Live In Concert (1995)

=== Compilation Albums ===
- Heghapoghashouchi Yerkarvesdi Janabare (2014)

=== Singles ===
- Partsratsir Partsratsour (1995)
- Bantarkyali Yerke (2008)
- Garo Kaplanian (2008)
- Hyrig (2008)
- Khachig Arabian (2008)
- Serj Tovmasian (2008)
- Haghterk Mardashounch (2008)
- Jeshmardoutyoun (2008)
- Nathaline Sarkisyan (2010)
- Baykare Hayots (feat. Garo Gaboudagian) (2011)
- Homentmen (2012)
- Yeraplur (2013)
- Baruyr Doudaklian (2013)
- Nemesis (2013)
- 50 Daris (2013)
- Syriahay Kacher (2013)
- Hay Dignotch Hamar (2014)
- Hin Houys Talar (2014)
- Vanetsi Gdrich (2014)
- Hokehankisd (2015)
- Arjani (feat. Sevak Amroyan) (2017)
- Arakadsi Kaykerk (2018)
- 100 Amyag Kaylerk (2018)
- Tebi Sassoun (feat. Harout Pamboukjian) (2018)
- Veradardzir (feat. Joseph Krikorian) (2018)
- Ganche Hoghin (feat. Tro Krikorian) (2018)
