= Armenchik =

Armenian American pop singer (born 1980)

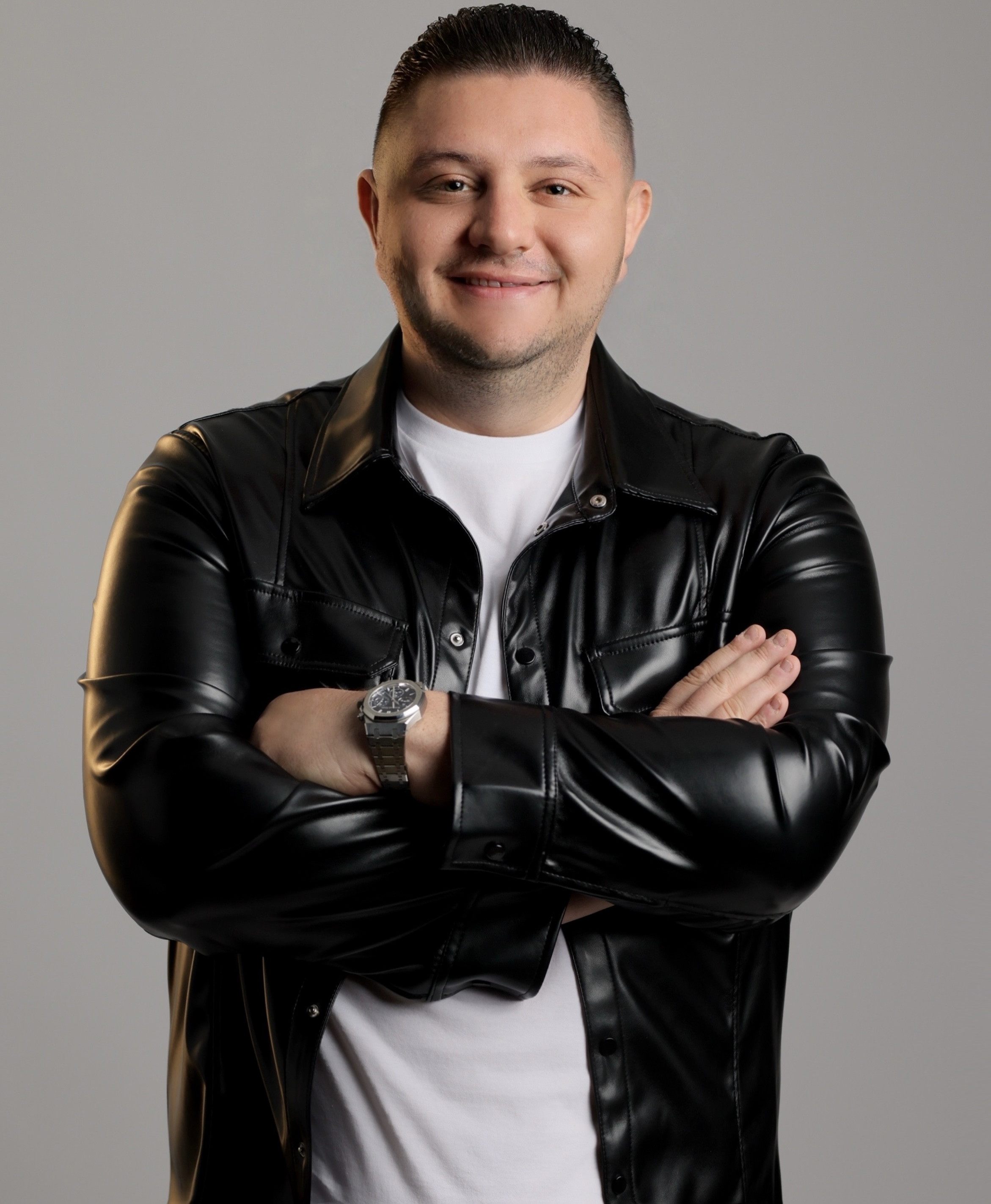
- Armenchik in 2025

Background information
- Born: Armen Gondrachyan; August 8, 1980 (age 46); Yerevan, Armenian SSR, Soviet Union
- Origin: Yerevan, Armenia
- Genres: Pop
- Years active: 1995–present
- Label: Armen Entertainment
- Website: www.armenchikmusic.com Instagram

Armen Hapeti Gondrachyan (Armenian: Արմեն Հապետի Գոնդրաչյան; born August 8, 1980), better known by his stage name Armenchik (Armenian: Արմենչիկ), is an Armenian-American pop singer based in Los Angeles.

== Early years and career ==
Armen Gondrachyan was born on August 8, 1980, in Yerevan, Armenia (then part of the Soviet Union). Armen started singing at a young age. In 1989, his family moved to the United States, settling in California, where a large number of Armenian Americans reside.

With the help of his father, Hapet, Armen successfully recorded his first album titled Armen & Nor Seround in 1995. In 1998, Armen moved back to Armenia, where he lived for a year before returning back to the United States.

Armenchik had his first concert in 2002 in Los Angeles, followed by two other concerts which took place at the Alex Theatre in Glendale, California in 2003 and 2004. Armenchik gave his 4th and 5th concerts at the Kodak Theatre in 2005 and 2006 respectively. Over the years, he had given concerts in several countries, such as Yerevan's Karen Demirchyan Complex, Russia, France, Canada, Greece, Italy, Ukraine, and in many cities of the United States including Las Vegas and Boston.

== Personal life ==
Armenchik married Lusine Manukyan, a Moscow Armenian in 2010. They have three children, Michael, Angelina, and Alexander.

Armenchik is fluent in Armenian and English and knows some Russian.

== Discography ==
=== Studio albums ===
- Armen & Nor Seround (1995)
- Siro Yerker (1996)
- Yerevan (1997)
- Hayastanoum (1998)
- Namak (2000)
- Allo Dues? (2001)
- Anunt Inche? (2003)
- Gone Gone (2004)
- Mi Kich - Mi Kich (2005)
- Havatam Te Che... (2007)
- The Road (2009)
- The Armenians (2011)

=== Compilation albums ===
- The Very Best Of (2010)

=== Live albums ===
- Concert (2004)
- Live at Kodak Theatre (2005)
- Live at Gibson Theatre (2007)
- Live at Nokia Theatre (2010)
- Live in Armenia (2014)

=== DVDs ===
- Concert (2004)
- Music Videos (Special Edition) (2005)
- Live at Kodak Theatre (2005)
- New and the Best Clips (2007)
- Live at Gibson Theatre (2007)
- Live at Nokia Theatre (2010)
- Live in Armenia (2014)

=== Singles ===
- Return (2010)
- Hents Hima (feat. Snoop Dogg) (2011)
- Happy Birthday (2012)
- Sers Qo Anunov (2012)
- Mek Mek (2012)
- Eghek Bari (2013)
- Kiss Me (feat. Francesa Ramirez) (2013)
- Nore Nore (2013)
- Taq E Taq E (2014)
- Ancir Ay Getak (feat. Harout Pamboukjian) (2014)
- Hayastan Jan (2015)
- True Love (2015)
- My Story (2016)
- Hayrik (2016)
- Im Lousin (2016)
- Enkerner (2016)
- Sirel Chigites (2017)
- She's Mine (feat. Super Sako) (2017)
- Du Im Heqiat (2017)
- Ushe (Remix) (feat. Super Sako) (2017)
- Es Qez Siroum Em (2018)
- Qo Orne (2018)
- Hay Aghkjikner (feat. Arman Hovhannisyan) (2018)
- Siretzi Yes Megin (2018)
- Khelagarvum Em (2019)
- Lav Lsir (Remix) (2019)
- Mot Ari (feat. Lilu) (2019)
- Zinvori Patgam (2019)
- Qaxcer (2020)
- Aveli (2020)
- Astvac Uj Tur (2021)
- Aveli (Remix) (2021)
- Bales (2021)
- Siro Masin (2021)
- Yeraz (2022)
- My Friend (Russian: Мой друг) (feat. Arkadi Dumikyan) (2022)
- Tariner (2023)
- Lavnes (2023)
- Ches Patkeracni (2023)
- Vonc Nayum Em (2023)
- Srtis Kes (2024)
- 1.2.3. (2024)
- Vonc Nayum Em (Remix) (2024)
- Im Siro Heqiat (2024)
- Jamanakin (feat. Christine Pepelyan) (2024)
- Mankutyun (2024)
- Axchkas Hamar (2025)
- Amena Tank (feat. Super Sako) (2025)
- Harsaniqi Or (2025)
- Jamerov (2025)
- Krake Na (2025)
- Esqanic El Avel (2025)

== Awards and nominations ==
Year	Award	Category	City	Result
2016	Pan Armenian Entertainment Awards	Best Male Singer of Armenian Diaspora	Los Angeles	Won
