= Super Sako =

Armenian-American music artist (born 1978)

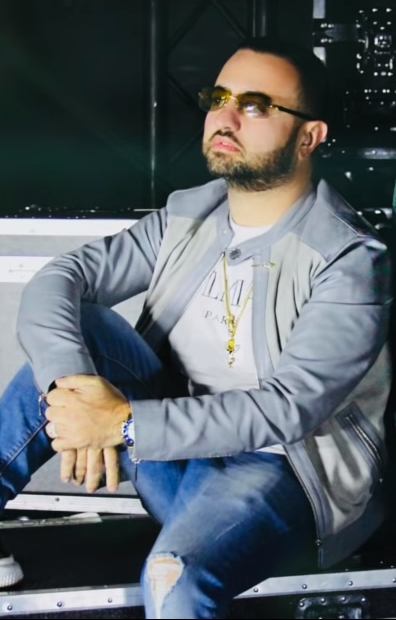
- Sako in 2017

Background information
- Born: Sarkis Balasanyan; August 17, 1978 (age 48); Yerevan, Armenian SSR, Soviet Union (now Armenia)
- Origin: Los Angeles, California
- Genres: Hip hop; Rabiz
- Occupations: Rapper; DJ; record producer

Sarkis Levoni Balasanyan (Armenian: Սարգիս Լևոնի Բալասանյան; born August 17, 1978), better known as Super Sako (Armenian: Սուպեր Սաքո), is an Armenian-American rapper, singer, DJ and record producer based in Los Angeles. He is best known for his hit single "Mi Gna," which ranked at #4 in France and #2 in Romania music charts in 2018.

== Early life ==
Balasanyan was born on 17 August 1978 in Yerevan, Armenian SSR, Soviet Union. He moved to Los Angeles, California, alongside his family at a young age and grew up in Hollywood.

== Career ==
As early as 1994, he started rapping under the name Sad Eyez. At the time he collaborated with the “Twinz” and AC now known as A.chilla, who were also Armenian rappers. Later becoming more involved with Armenian singers such as Suro, Tatul Avoyan and releasing an Armenian Rabiz/hip-hop mix with Samvel Sahakyan, “Mots Ari”.

Later in 2008, Super Sako would release his first official album known as Saint Sarkis. He would later release more albums throughout the years, which include Saint Sarkis 2, Saint Sarkis 3, Saint Sarkis 4, Sako and Friends, and his the album Love Crimes in 2016.

His 2016 single "Mi Gna" taken from his album Love Crimes, and featuring rabiz singer Spitakci Hayko, became a hit in Armenia, the Armenian diaspora, Turkey, the Arab countries, and elsewhere. Artists who have covered the song include French rapper Maître Gims.

In 2020, he released a new track with the Egyptian singer and actor and Mohamed Ramadan called "Tik Tok" which resulted in 2 million downloads in its first 24 hours of release.

In May 2022, his hand prints were cemented in front of the TCL Chinese Theater in Hollywood. Present at the ceremony were other Armenian artists such as Armenchik, Andy Madadian and Tigran Asatryan.

Also in May 2022, he released a new track called "Cake" with Offset (member of the rap group Migos).

In 2024, he released a new album called Saint Sarkis 5 and in October 2024 performed a concert at the Dolby Theatre in Los Angeles.

== Style ==
Super Sako blends traditional Armenian urban folk music with American rap. He is the first and best known Armenian artist do so. He is the originator of the genre “rap-biz” (a combination of rap and rabiz music).

== Personal life ==
He has two kids.

== Discography ==
=== Albums ===
- Voch 1-in Chases (with Emmy) (2007)
- Saint Sarkis (2008)
- Saint Sarkis 2 (2009)
- Saint Sarkis 3 (2010)
- Saint Sarkis 4 (2012)
- Sako and Friends (2012)
- Love Crimes (2016)
- Saint Sarkis 5 (2024)

=== Charted singles ===
Title	Year	Peak chart positions					Certifications	Album
Title	Year	BEL (Fl)	BUL	FRA	ROM	SWI	Certifications	Album
"Mi Gna" (with Maître Gims featuring Spitakci Hayko)	2018	21	14	4	2	74	SNEP: Platinum	Love Crimes / Ceinture noire

=== Other singles ===
- 1994: "Big Time Criminals"
- 1994: "Armenian Power" (feat. Ghost Daddy (Twinz))
- 1995: “Mots Ari” (feat. Samvel Sahakyan)
- 1996: "Sippin on Cognac" (feat. AC)
- 2000-2001: "RIP Silent" (feat. Unknown Armenian Singer)
- 2016: "Mi Gna" (Armenian: Մի գնա) (feat. Spitakci Hayko)
- 2017: "Amena Lavnes" (Armenian: Ամենալավն ես) (feat. Harout Balyan)
- 2017: "She's Mine" (Armenian: Իմն է նա, romanized: Imn e na) (feat. Armenchik)
- 2018: "Mi Gna" (feat. Spitakci Hayko & Maître Gims)
- 2019: "Gna Gna/La Tghibi" (Armenian: Գնա Գնա, Arabic: لا تغيبي) (feat. Eyad Tannous & Suro)
- 2019: "Señorita" (feat. Fadi Kod)
- 2019: "Amenur es" (Armenian: Ամենուր ես) (feat. Saro Tovmasyan)
- 2019։ "Samo tvoia" (feat. Andrea)
- 2020: "Tik Tok" (feat. Mohamed Ramadan)
- 2021: "Sunshine & Rain" (feat. Kan)
- 2021: "Amor Mio" (feat. Gipsy Kings)
- 2022: "Cake" (feat Offset of Migos)

=== Featured in ===
- 2019: "Yes" (Karl Wolf feat. Super Sako, Deena, Fito Blanko)
- 2021: "Sirts Patrasta" (Armenian: Սիրտս պատրաստ ա) (OFI feat. Hak & Super Sako)
