= Dardan discography =

- Studio albums: 9
- EPs: 4
- Singles as lead artist: 44
- Singles as featured artist: 2

German rapper Dardan has released nine studio albums (including one collaborative album), four extended plays, 44 singles as a lead artist and two as a featured artist.

== Albums ==
List of studio albums, with selected chart positions
Title	Details	Peak chart positions		
Title	Details	GER	AUT	SWI
Hallo Deutschrap	Released: 19 May 2017; Label: Thirtysevensounds; Formats: CD, digital download, streaming	25	44	11
Sorry	Released: 16 August 2019; Label: Hypnotize Entertainment, Urban; Formats: CD, digital download, streaming	19	32	17
Soko Disko	Released: 22 May 2020; Label: Hypnotize Entertainment, Urban; Formats: CD, digital download, streaming	19	10	8
Mister Dardy	Released: 4 February 2021; Label: Hypnotize Entertainment, Urban; Formats: CD, digital download, streaming	9	10	11
DardyNextDoor	Released: 29 July 2022; Label: Hypnotize Entertainment; Formats: CD, digital download, streaming	11	46	17
Dardania	Released: 29 September 2023; Label: Hypnotize Entertainment; Formats: CD, digital download, streaming	54	29	9
Eurosport (with Azet)	Released: 28 June 2024; Label: Fastlife Records, Hypnotize Entertainment; Formats: CD, digital download, streaming	1	8	2
Mr. Untouchable	Released: 8 November 2024; Label: Hypnotize Entertainment; Formats: CD, digital download, streaming	10	17	5
Catch Me If You Can	Released: 7 November 2025; Label: Hypnotize Entertainment; Formats: CD, digital download, streaming	16	25	7
"—" denotes a recording that did not chart or was not released in that territory.

== Extended plays ==
List of extended plays, with selected chart positions
Title	Details	Peak chart positions		
Title	Details	GER	AUT	SWI
Dardy Luther King I	Released: 23 March 2018; Label: Hypnotize Entertainment; Formats: CD, digital download, streaming	13	54	54
Dardy Luther King II	Released: 6 July 2018; Label: Hypnotize Entertainment; Formats: CD, digital download, streaming	—	—	54
Hypnotize	Released: 17 August 2018; Label: Hypnotize Entertainment; Formats: CD, digital download, streaming	61	—	65
Emerald (with Nimo)	Released: 4 November 2021; Label: Hypnotize Entertainment, Urban; Formats: CD, digital download, streaming	—	48	50
"—" denotes a recording that did not chart or was not released in that territory.

== Singles ==
=== As lead artist ===
==== 2010s ====
List of singles in the 2010s decade, with selected chart positions and certifications
Title	Year	Peak chart positions				Certifications	Album
Title	Year	GER	ALB	AUT	SWI	Certifications	Album
"Telefon" (featuring Nimo)	2017	25	—	41	43	none	Dardy Luther King I
"Tango & Cash" (with Buta)	2017	—	45	—	—	none	Non-album single
"Airmax gegen Kopf" (featuring Luciano)	2018	28	—	63	71	none	Dardy Luther King I
"Piccos" (featuring Nimo)	2018	32	—	37	81	none	Dardy Luther King II
"Fuego"	2018	84	—	—	—	none	Dardy Luther King II
"Ice"	2018	69	—	—	—	none	Dardy Luther King II
"Facetime"	2018	7	—	22	39	BVMI: Gold	Hypnotize
"Coco Mama"	2019	4	—	9	12	BVMI: Gold	Sorry
"Sorry"	2019	29	—	43	63	none	Sorry
"A Milly" (featuring Mozzik)	2019	19	53	22	20	none	Sorry
"Wer macht Para 2" (featuring Eno)	2019	5	—	10	14	none	Sorry
"Komm zu Hypnotize"	2019	21	—	50	51	none	Sorry
"Kadale"	2019	23	—	36	38	none	Sorry
"Genauso" (featuring Xiara)	2019	19	—	26	40	BVMI: Gold	Sorry
"Wo" (with Patron)	2019	54	—	—	—	none	Sorry
"Standort" (with Pietro Lombardi)	2019	31	—	—	—	none	Non-album single
"—" denotes a recording that did not chart or was not released in that territory.

==== 2020s ====
List of singles in the 2020s decade, with selected chart positions and certifications
Title	Year	Peak chart positions						Certifications	Album
Title	Year	GER	ALB	AUT	FRA	GRE	SWI	Certifications	Album
"6am"	2020	4	—	15	—	—	19	none	Soko Disko
"Dayyytona"	2020	5	1	11	—	—	17	none	Soko Disko
"H<3tel" (featuring Monet192)	2020	2	—	6	—	—	4	BVMI: Gold	Soko Disko
"Wie lang"	2020	9	—	14	—	—	26	none	Soko Disko
"Viele" (featuring Veysel)	2020	19	—	16	—	—	20	none	Soko Disko
"Favela"	2020	11	1	19	—	—	26	none	Soko Disko
"Aventador" (with Eno and Noah)	2020	20	12	35	—	—	58	none	Soko Disko
"Ma bae"	2020	15	—	26	—	—	34	none	Non-album singles
"Details" (featuring Reezy)	2020	32	—	60	—	—	73	none	Non-album singles
"Gar kein bock" (with Monet192)	2020	40	81	58	—	—	46	none	Non-album singles
"Gigi" (with Monet192)	2020	27	—	54	—	—	50	none	Non-album singles
"Mailbox" (featuring Hava)	2020	7	—	21	—	—	21	none	Non-album singles
"Who the Fuck Is This?" (with Gunboi)	2020	42	—	—	—	—	97	none	Non-album singles
"Ka Je"	2020	21	—	—	—	—	25	none	Non-album singles
"Coke Light"	2021	12	—	21	—	—	25	none	Non-album singles
"Habibi" (with Ricky Rich and Zuna)	2021	29	—	52	101	—	46	none	Non-album singles
"GTA"	2021	14	—	25	—	—	23	none	Non-album singles
"Cloud7" (with Cro)	2021	12	—	20	—	—	36	none	Non-album singles
"Për ty" (with Mozzik and Nimo)	2021	14	—	19	—	—	14	none	Non-album singles
"High" (with Hava)	2021	7	—	8	—	—	9	none	Non-album singles
"Habibi (Albanian Remix)" (with Ricky Rich and Zuna)	2021	—	—	—	—	99	—	none	Non-album singles
"Alles gut" (with Jugglerz and Noizy)	2022	23	—	27	—	—	11	none	
"I Don't Wanna Party No More"	2022	33	—	65	—	—	51	none	DardyNextDoor
"Paris"	2022	26	—	46	—	—	37	none	DardyNextDoor
"Obsessed" (with RAF Camora)	2022	8	—	5	—	—	9	none	DardyNextDoor
"Prime" (with Omar)	2022	42	—	—	—	—	69	none	DardyNextDoor
"Bandita" (with Noizy)	2022	54	—	—	—	—	37	none	DardyNextDoor
"Day & Night" (with Hava)	2022	42	—	—	—	—	68	none	DardyNextDoor
"On Fire" (with Ricky Rich)	2022	46	—	—	—	—	72	none	DardyNextDoor
"Mi amor" (with Bené)	2022	50	—	—	—	—	83	none	DardyNextDoor
"Ende" (with Nimo)	2022	54	—	—	—	—	63	none	Non-album single
"—" denotes a recording that did not chart or was not released in that territory.

=== As featured artist ===
List of singles as featured artist, with selected chart positions
Title	Year	Peak chart positions			Album
Title	Year	GER	AUT	SWI	Album
"Licht" (Bausa featuring Dardan)	2019	19	53	—	Fieber
"SoSo" (Monet192 featuring Dardan)	2020	28	52	34	Non-album single
"—" denotes a recording that did not chart or was not released in that territory.
