= Azet discography =

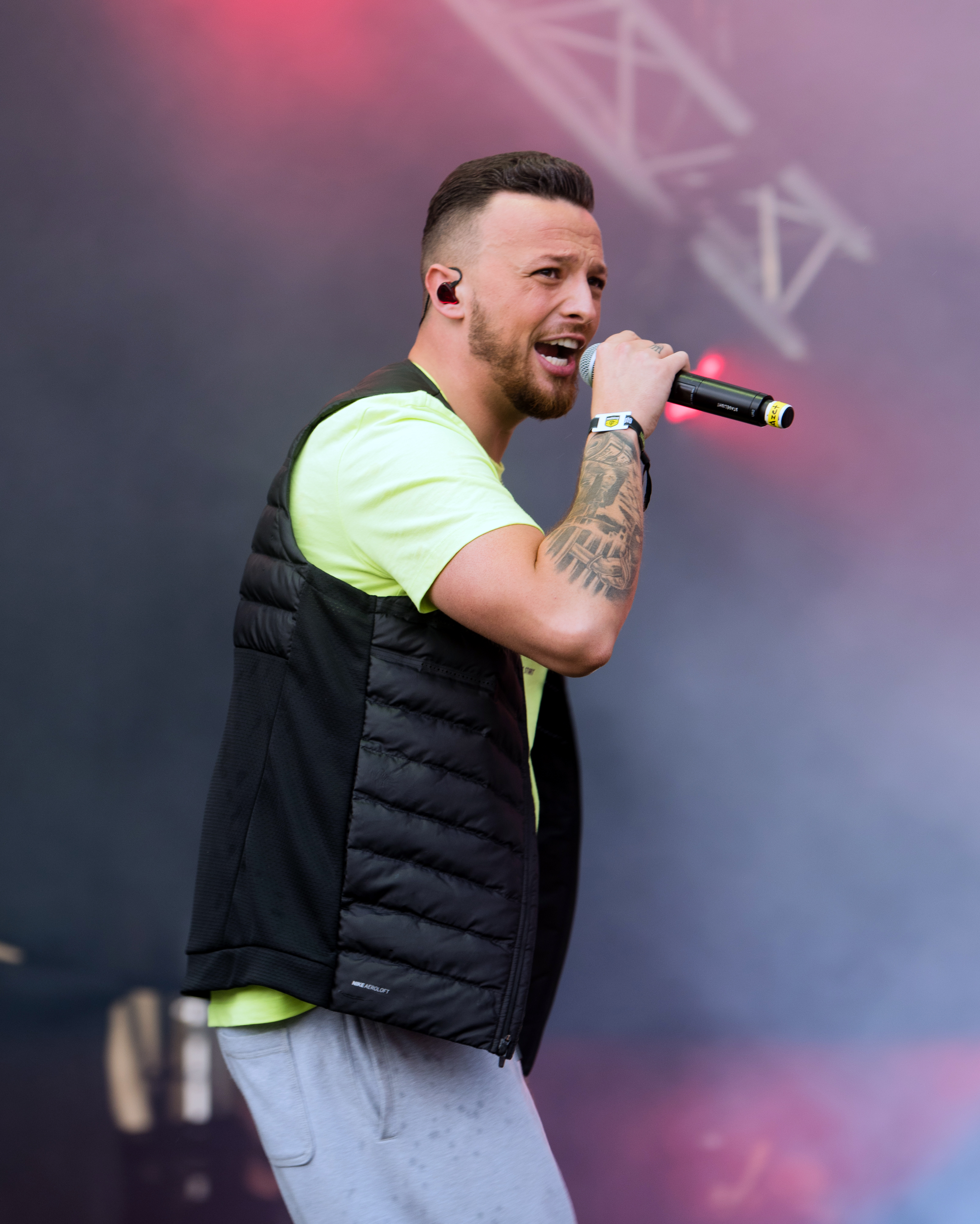
- Azet performing at the Openair Frauenfeld, 2019
- Studio albums: 2
- EPs: 2
- Singles: 42
- Collaborative albums: 2

German rapper Azet has released two studio albums, two collaborative albums, two extended plays and forty-two singles including seven singles as a featured artist.

Azet premiered his first studio album Fast Life in 2018 and debuted the charts at number one in Germany, Austria and Switzerland which also spawned five singles such as "Gjynah", "9 Milly", "Ketten Cartier", "Kriminell" and notably "Qa Bone" which was certified gold in the German-speaking Europe.

He achieved similar success in 2019 with the subsequent collaborative album Super Plus with Zuna which topped the charts at number one in Germany, Austria and number two in Switzerland. The album spawned four singles such as "Skam koh", "Lelele", "Wenn die Sonne untergeht", "Hallo Hallo" and "Fragen" all of them entering the charts in all three countries.

== Albums ==
=== Studio albums ===
List of studio albums, with selected chart positions and certifications
Title	Album details	Peak chart positions		
Title	Album details	GER	AUT	SWI
Fast Life	Released: 30 March 2018; Label: KMN Gang; Formats: CD, digital download, streaming	1	1	1
Neue Welt	Released: 11 June 2021; Label: KMN Gang; Formats: CD, digital download, streaming	1	3	1

=== Collaborative albums ===
List of collaborative albums, with selected chart positions and certifications
Title	Album details	Peak chart positions		
Title	Album details	GER	AUT	SWI
Super Plus (with Zuna)	Released: 8 March 2019; Label: KMN Gang; Formats: CD, digital download, streaming	1	1	2
Fast Life 2 (with Albi)	Released: 18 September 2020; Label: KMN Gang; Formats: CD, digital download, streaming	3	4	2
Ultra Plus (with Zuna)	Released: 16 September 2022; Label: KMN Gang; Formats: CD, digital download, streaming	7	11	3
Eurosport (with Dardan)	Released: 28 June 2024; Label: Fastlife Records, Hypnotize Entertainment; Formats: CD, digital download, streaming	1	8	2

== Extended plays ==
List of extended plays with selected chart positions
Title	EP details	Peak chart positions		
Title	EP details	GER	AUT	SWI
Fast Life	Released: 2 June 2016; Label: KMN Gang; Formats: Digital download, streaming	—	—	51
Mango	Released: 5 November 2019; Label: KMN Gang; Formats: Digital download, streaming	40	31	39
Tirana, Vol. 1	Released: 10 March 2023; Label: KMN Gang; Formats: Digital download, streaming	—	74	28
Tirana, Vol. 2	Released: 11 August 2023; Label: Fastlife Records; Formats: Digital download, streaming	—	—	26
Tirana, Vol. 3	Released: 8 December 2023; Label: Fastlife Records; Formats: Digital download, streaming	67	—	14
Family & Money	Released: 30 August 2024; Label: Fastlife Records; Formats: Digital download, streaming	54	—	13
Für alle Blocks	Released: 22 November 2024; Label: Fastlife Records; Formats: Digital download, streaming	60	—	17

== Singles ==
=== As lead artist ===
List of singles as lead artist, with selected chart positions and certifications, showing year released and album name
Title	Year	Peak chart positions				Certifications	Album
Title	Year	GER	ALB	AUT	SWI	Certifications	Album
"Patte fließt"	2016	58	—	—	85	none	Non-album single
"Gjynah"	2017	8	—	20	8	none	Fast Life
"Qa Bone" (featuring RAF Camora)	2017	12	—	17	30	BVMI: Gold; IFPI AUT: Gold; IFPI SWI: Gold	Fast Life
"9 Milly"	2018	13	—	12	17	none	Fast Life
"Ketten Cartier"	2018	27	—	44	28	none	Fast Life
"Kriminell" (featuring Zuna and Noizy)	2018	5	—	11	13	none	Fast Life
"Überlebt"	2018	28	—	30	15	IFPI SWI: Gold	Fast Life
"Nike Pullover"	2018	18	—	27	30	none	Non-album single
"Skam koh" (with Zuna)	2018	5	—	10	4	none	Super Plus
"Lelele" (with Zuna)	2018	6	—	11	5	none	Super Plus
"Crack, Koks, Piece Unternehmen" (with Nash)	2019	13	—	21	32	none	Non-album single
"Wenn die Sonne untergeht" (with Zuna)	2019	7	—	8	9	none	Super Plus
"Hallo Hallo" (with Zuna)	2019	3	—	7	7	none	Super Plus
"Fragen" (with Zuna)	2019	4	—	9	10	none	Super Plus
"Money Money"	2019	16	—	20	15	none	Non-album singles
"Lass los" (with Dhurata Dora)	2020	10	24	10	4	none	Non-album singles
"Sin City" (with Albi)	2020	14	—	25	19	none	Fast Life 2
"Fajet" (with Dhurata Dora)	2020	32	1	37	8	none	Non-album single
"Zwei" (with Albi)	2020	14	—	20	15	none	Fast Life
"Xhep" (with Albi)	2020	30	—	36	25	none	Fast Life
"D&G" (with Albi)	2020	58	—	75	58	none	Fast Life
"Zehnte Etage" (with Albi)	2020	18	—	41	40	none	Fast Life
"B.L.F.L." (with Capital Bra)	2020	4	—	6	5	none	Non-album single

=== As featured artist ===
List of singles as featured artist, with selected chart positions and certifications, showing year released and album name
Title	Year	Peak chart positions			Certifications	Album
Title	Year	GER	AUT	SWI	Certifications	Album
"Nummer 1" (Zuna featuring Azet and Noizy)	2017	7	42	25	BVMI: Platinum; IFPI AUT: Gold; IFPI SWI: Gold	Mele7
"Czech Republic" (Zuna featuring Azet)	2017	78	—	—		Mele7
"Zigarren Havanna" (Miami Yacine featuring Azet)	2017	77	—	68		Casia
"Balla" (Xatar featuring Azet)	2018	22	49	27		non-album singles
"KMN Member" (KMN Gang featuring Azet, Miami Yacine, Nash & Zuna)	2018	11	10	9		non-album singles
"Leben schnell" (Nash featuring Azet)	2019	58	—	92		non-album singles
"Hayabusa" (Miami Yacine featuring Azet)	2019	17	19	18		non-album singles
"Remontada" (Sofiane featuring Azet)	2020	—	—	95		non-album singles

== Other charted songs ==
List of other charted songs, with chart positions
Title	Year	Peak chart positions			Certifications	Album
Title	Year	GER	AUT	SWI	Certifications	Album
"Villa in weiss"	2018	47	58	—		Fast Life
"Mama"	2018	70	—	55		Fast Life
"Rein raus" (featuring Miami Yacine)	2018	86	—	—		Fast Life
"Fast Life"	2018	89	—	—	BVMI: Gold	Fast Life
"Wer will mitfahren" (featuring Zuna)	2018	98	—	—		Fast Life
"Kamehameha" (with Zuna)	2019	5	9	10		Super Plus
"Pam pam" (with Zuna)	2019	18	20	23		Super Plus
"Pare" (with Zuna)	2019	31	—	14		Super Plus
"Nese Don" (with Zuna featuring RAF Camora)	2019	45	—	—		Super Plus
"Ist es wahr" (with Zuna)	2019	52	—	—		Super Plus
"Geld verdammt" (with Zuna featuring Miami Yacine)	2019	65	—	—		Super Plus
"Zieh" (with Zuna)	2019	69	—	—		Super Plus
"Ghetto" (with Zuna)	2019	73	—	—		Super Plus
"Seele"	2019	11	13	12		Mango
"Haze im Paper"	2019	—	—	64		Mango
"Lolo" (with Tokyo)	2019	—	—	90		Mango
"Fast Life 2" (with Albi)	2020	24	17	13		Fast Life 2
"Inshallah" (with Albi)	2020	—	—	80		Fast Life 2

== See also ==
- List of number-one hits of 2018 (Germany)
- List of number-one hits of 2019 (Germany)
