= Dhurata Dora =

Kosovar singer and songwriter (born 1992)

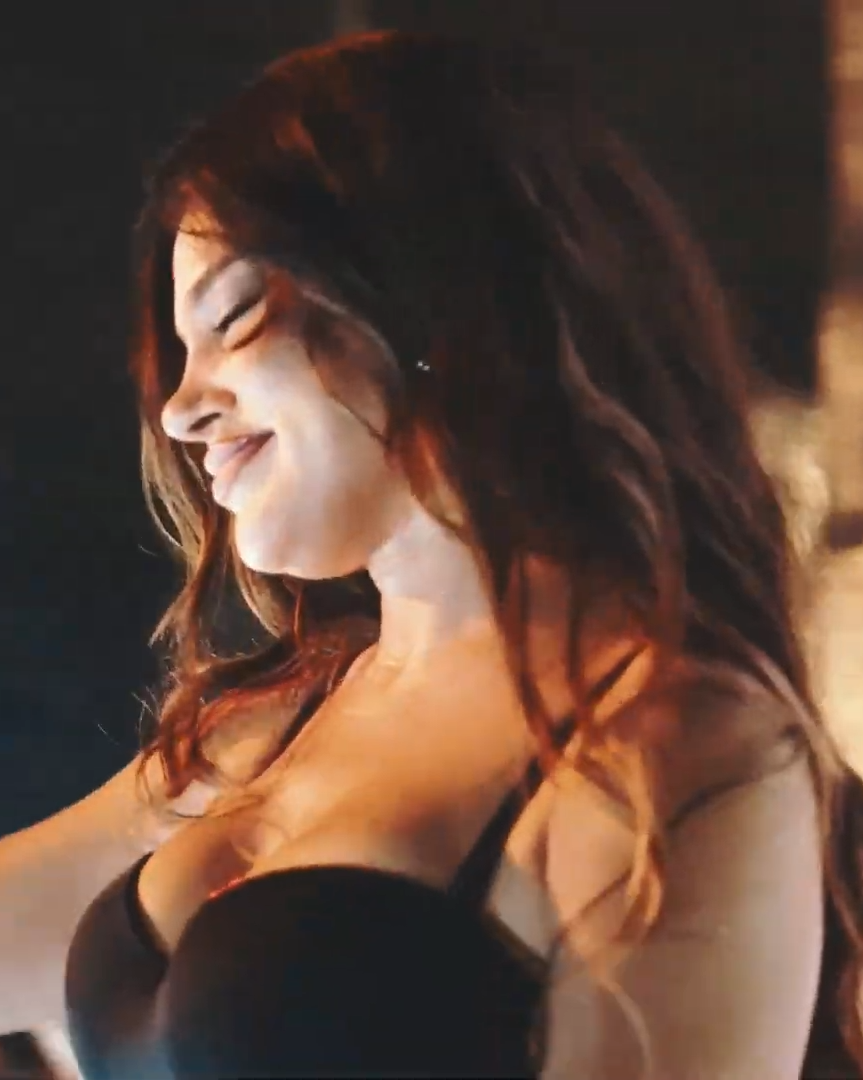
- Dhurata Dora performing live in Alanya in August 2024
- Born: Dhurata Murturi; 24 December 1992 (age 33); Nuremberg, Germany
- Occupation: Singer
- Years active: 2011–present
- Known for: Music
- Notable work: Zemër
- Musical career
- Genres: Pop; reggae
- Instrument: Vocals
- Label: Epic
- Website: instagram.com/dhuratadora

Dhurata Murturi (born 24 December 1992), known professionally as Dhurata Dora (Albanian: [ðuˈɾata ˈdoɾa]), is a Kosovan - Albanian singer and songwriter.

== Life and career ==
Dhurata Murturi was born into an Albanian family in the city of Nuremberg in Bavaria, Germany. She went to elementary school in the town of Fürth. She started singing as a young woman under the name Dhurata Dora. She began her music career in Kosovo, where she released her first single and music video in 2011, "Vetë kërkove". Following success from her first single, she collaborated with Don Arbas, releasing "Get Down" in 2012. The song proved to be even more popular than her first. The following year she launched "I Like Dat". In summer of 2013, she released the hit song "Edhe Pak", in a collaboration with Blunt & Real and Lumi B.

In November 2014, Dora's single "A bombi" was released. During spring 2015, Dora began working with the company Max Production Albania.

In April 2019, she premiered her international breakthrough single "Zemër" in collaboration with Algerian rapper Soolking. The single reached number one in Albania and entered the music chart in Belgium, Switzerland and France where it went on to be certified platinum by the Syndicat National de l'Édition Phonographique (SNEP). As of July 2022 it counts more than 714 million views on YouTube. In February 2020, she collaborated with German-Albanian rapper Azet on the German-language single "Lass los".

In March 2023 she released her album Dhurata. The album has 16 original songs, eight of which are collaborations with different artists. In July 2023 she published her single "Pa mu". The song is produced by Panda Music, lyrics and melody by Dhurata Dora, Denk and Tonic. Also in July 2023 she collaborated with RAF Camora and published the song "Palma".

She also collaborated with Romanian singer Inna and English rapper Stefflon Don on the single "Yummy" in 2023.

== Discography ==
=== Albums ===
• 2023: DHURATA

==== Studio albums ====
List of studio albums, with selected chart positions
| Title | Album details | Peak chart positions | |
| Title | Album details | AUT | SWI |
|---|---|---|---|
| Dhurata | Released: 3 March 2023; Label: Epic; Formats: Digital download, streaming | 40 | 8 |

==== Extended plays ====
List of studio albums, with selected chart positions
| Title | Album details |
|---|---|
| A bombi | Released: 8 November 2014; Label: Acromax Media; Formats: Digital download, streaming |
| Vera me ty (with Yll Limani) | Released: 11 July 2024; Label: Three60; Formats: Digital download, streaming |

=== Singles ===
- 2011: Vetë Kërkove
- 2011: Intervista Me
- 2012: Ska Limit (feat. 2ton)
- 2012: Swim Good
- 2012: Get Down (feat. Don Arbas)
- 2012: Dance Flow (feat Soulkid & Libri)
- 2013: Afër Meje (feat. kaos)
- 2013: Bohët Mirë (feat. Kaos)
- 2013: I Like Dat
- 2013: 1000 Kilometra
- 2013: Edhe Pak (feat. Blunt & Real, Lumi B)
- 2014: Roll (feat. Young Zerka)
- 2014: Nice & Slow
- 2014: A Bombi
- 2015: Ti don
- 2015: Shumë ON
- 2016: Zoom Zoom (feat. Vig Poppa)
- 2016: Numrin e Ri
- 2016: Bongo (feat. Capital T)
- 2016: Vec Ty
- 2016: Ayo
- 2017: Simpatia (feat. Lumi B)
- 2017: Bubble
- 2017: Kesh Kesh
- 2018: Trendafil (feat. Flori Mumajesi)
- 2018: Jake Jake
- 2018: Qikat E Mia
- 2019: Zemër (feat. Soolking)
- 2019: 100 shkallë
- 2020: Lass Los (feat. Azet)
- 2020: Ferrari
- 2020: Fajet (feat. Azet)
- 2020: Harrom
- 2021: Only You (feat. GIMS)
- 2021: Mi Amor (feat. Noizy)
- 2021: Criminal
- 2022: Sa M'ke Mungu
- 2022: Gajde (feat. Elvana Gjata)
- 2022: Adrenalina (feat. Luciano)
- 2022: Oeo (feat. Azet & Zuna)
- 2023: Yummy (feat. INNA & Stefflon Don)
- 2023: Sonne
- 2023: Besame
- 2023: DHURATA [ALBUM]
- 2023: Rrotullo (feat. Elvana Gjata)
- 2023: Genau So (feat. Bausa)
- 2023: Kallma (feat. Noizy)
- 2023: PA MU
- 2023: Palma (feat. RAF Camora)
- 2023: Mary
- 2023: Lej (feat. Don Xhoni)
- 2024: Sheqer
- 2024: Chaos (feat. LEA)
- 2024: Tortura (feat. MC Kresha &:Lyrical Son)
- 2024: Vera Mety [EP] (feat. Yll Limani)
- 2024: Te Quiero (feat. Murda)
- 2024: Kef Halak (feat. Stefania)
- 2024: Ha Ha
- 2025: Fallad I Veres (feat. MC Kresha & Lyrical Son)
- 2025: Vonë
- 2025: Qaje (feat. Any Gonzalez)
- 2025: Astika (feat. Dystinct & Mohamed Ramadan)
- 2025 : Atë Ditë (feat. Noizy)
- 2026 : NRVZ
- 2026: Don Ti
- 2026: Toka (feat. DJ Snake)
- 2026: Gasolina (feat. Gjesti)
- 2026: INAT (feat. Zeynep Bastık)

==== As lead artist ====
===== 2010s =====
List of singles in the 2010s decade, with selected chart positions and certifications
| Title | Year | Peak chart positions | | | | Certifications | Album |
| Title | Year | ALB | BEL (Wa) | FRA | SWI | Certifications | Album |
|---|---|---|---|---|---|---|---|
| "Vetë kërkove" | 2011 | —N/a | — | — | — | none | Non-album single |
| "Get down" (featuring Don Arbas) | 2012 | —N/a | — | — | — | none | Non-album single |
| "I like dat" | 2013 | —N/a | — | — | — | none | A bombi |
| "Roll" (featuring Young Zerka) | 2014 | —N/a | — | — | — | none | A bombi |
| "A bombi" | 2014 | —N/a | — | — | — | none | A bombi |
| "Ti don" | 2015 | —N/a | — | — | — | none | A bombi |
| "Shumë on" | 2015 | —N/a | — | — | — | none | A bombi |
| "Numrin e ri" | 2016 | 5 | — | — | — | none | A bombi |
| "Vec ty" | 2016 | 16 | — | — | — | none | Non-album single |
| "Ayo" | 2016 | 1 | — | — | — | none | Non-album single |
| "Simpatia" (featuring Lumi B) | 2017 | 6 | — | — | — | none | Non-album single |
| "Bubble" | 2017 | 16 | — | — | — | none | Non-album single |
| "Kesh Kesh" | 2017 | 5 | — | — | — | none | Non-album single |
| "Trëndafil" (featuring Flori Mumajesi) | 2018 | 1 | — | — | — | none | Non-album single |
| "Jake Jake" | 2018 | 8 | — | — | — | none | Non-album single |
| "Qikat e mia" | 2018 | 17 | — | — | — | none | Non-album single |
| "Zemër" (featuring Soolking) | 2019 | 1 | 6 | 21 | 13 | SNEP: Platinum | Non-album single |
| "100 Shkallë" (with Big Bang) | 2019 | — | — | — | — | none | Non-album single |
"—" denotes a recording that did not chart or was not released in that territory.

===== 2020s =====
List of singles in the 2020s decade, with selected chart positions
| Title | Year | Peak chart positions | | | | | Album |
| Title | Year | ALB | AUT | GER | GRE | SWI | Album |
|---|---|---|---|---|---|---|---|
| "Lass los" (with Azet) | 2020 | 24 | 10 | 10 | — | 4 | Non-album single |
| "Ferrari" | 2020 | — | — | — | — | — | Non-album single |
| "Fajet" (with Azet) | 2020 | 1 | 37 | 32 | — | 8 | Non-album single |
| "Harrom" | 2020 | — | — | — | — | 81 | Non-album single |
| "Mi Amor" (featuring Noizy) | 2021 | — | — | — | — | 19 | Dhurata |
| "Criminal" | 2021 | 24 | — | — | — | 70 | Dhurata |
| "Sa m'ke mungu" | 2022 | 7 | — | — | — | 40 | Non-album single |
| "Gajde" (with Elvana Gjata) | 2022 | 1 | — | — | — | 11 | Non-album single |
| "Adrenalina" (featuring Luciano) | 2022 | — | 14 | 19 | — | 3 | Dhurata |
| "Yummy" (with Inna and Stefflon Don) | 2023 | — | — | — | — | — | Non-album single |
| "Sonne" | 2023 | — | — | — | — | — | Dhurata |
| "Rrotullo" (with Elvana Gjata) | 2023 | — | — | — | — | — | Non-album single |
| "Kallma" (with Noizy) | 2023 | — | — | — | — | 9 | Non-album single |
| "Pa mu" | 2023 | — | — | — | — | 86 | Non-album single |
| "Palma" (with RAF Camora) | 2023 | — | 17 | 38 | — | 22 | Non-album single |
| "Lej" (with Don Xhoni) | 2023 | — | — | — | 10 | 12 | Non-album single |
| "Sheqer" | 2024 | — | — | — | — | 57 | Non-album single |
| "Chaos" (with Lea) | 2024 | — | — | 56 | — | 84 | Non-album single |
| "Tortura" (with MC Kresha and Lyrical Son) | 2024 | — | — | — | — | 75 | Non-album single |
| "Kef Halak” (with Stefania) | 2024 | — | — | — | — | — | Non-album single |
| "Te Quiero (with Murda) | 2024 | — | — | — | — | — | Non-album single |
| ‘’Haha’’ | 2024 | — | — | — | — | — | Non-album single |
| ‘’Fallad i Veres’’(ft MC Kresha & Lyrical Son) | 2025 | — | — | — | — | — | |
| ‘’VONË’’ | 2025 | — | — | — | — | — | |
| ‘’Qajë’’ (feat Any Gonzaléz) | 2025 | — | — | — | — | — | |
| ‘’Astika’’ (feat Dystinct & Mohamed Ramadan ) | 2025 | — | — | — | — | — | |
| ‘’Sytë’’(feat Azet & Dardan ) | 2025 | — | — | — | — | — | |
| ‘’Ate Ditë (feat Noizy | 2025 | — | — | — | — | — | |
| ‘’NRVZ’’ | 2026 | — | — | — | — | — | |
| “Don Ti” | 2026 | — | — | — | — | — | |
| “TOKA” (feat DJ Snake) | 2026 | — | — | — | — | — | |
| “Gasolina” (feat. Gjesti | 2026 | — | — | — | — | — | |
| “INAT” (feat. Zeynep Bastık) | 2026 | — | — | — | — | — | |

==== As featured artist ====
• Don Arbas

• 2ton

• Libri

• Kaos

• DJ Blunt & Real

• Lumi B

• Young Zerka

• Vig Poppa

• Capital T

• Dj Geek

• Flori Mumajesi

• Soolking

• GIMS

• Moe Phoenix

• Azet

• Albi

• Noizy

• Elvana Gjata

• Luciano

• Zuna

• INNA

• Stefflon Don

• Bausa

• Jay1

• Ecko

• Raf Camora

• Don Xhoni

• LEA

• MC Kresha

• Lyrical Son

• Yll Limani

• Murda

• Stefania

• Any Gonzalez

• Dystinct

• Mohamed Ramadan

• Dj Snake

• Tayna

• Gjesti

• Zeynep Bastık

List of singles as featured artist, with selected chart positions
| Title | Year | Peak chart positions | | | | Album |
| Title | Year | ALB | FRA | GER | SWI | Album |
|---|---|---|---|---|---|---|
| "Bongo" (Capital T featuring Dhurata Dora) | 2016 | 3 | — | — | — | Non-album single |
| "Te quiero" (Gims and DJ Assad featuring Dhurata Dora) | 2019 | — | — | — | — | Ceinture noire |
| "Only You" (Gims featuring Dhurata Dora) | 2021 | 3 | 84 | — | 19 | Le Fléau |
| "Oeo" (Azet and Zuna featuring Dhurata Dora) | 2022 | — | — | 59 | 33 | Non-album single |
"—" denotes a recording that did not chart or was not released in that territory.

=== Other charted songs ===
List of other charted songs, with selected chart positions
| Title | Year | Peak chart positions | Album |
| Title | Year | SWI | Album |
|---|---|---|---|
| "Besame" | 2023 | 47 | Dhurata |
| "Luj" (featuring Elvana Gjata) | 2023 | 69 | Dhurata |
| "Shut Up" (featuring Luciano and Noizy) | 2023 | 51 | Non-album single |
"—" denotes a recording that did not chart or was not released in that territory.
