= Hava (musician) =

German rapper and singer

- Born: Dilara Hava Tunç; 12 August 1998 (age 27); Hamm, Germany
- Genres: Hip hop
- Occupations: Rapper; singer; songwriter
- Years active: 2019–present

Dilara Hava Tunç (born 12 August 1998), known professionally as Hava, is a German rapper and singer of Bosniak and Turkish descent.

== Life ==
She was born and lives in Hamm. Her father originates from Aksaray in Turkey. Her mother was born in Germany to parents from Doboj in Bosnia and Herzegovina. Hava has six siblings and one stepbrother. Apart from her brother Adem and her sister Dalia, all of them are much younger than Hava. Although German was spoken exclusively at home, Hava can also speak Bosnian and Turkish. She is Muslim, and in her childhood she also wore a headscarf for many years.

In her own words, she taught herself to play the piano from age five and dreamed of making music. Hava first gained fame through vocal videos on social media and later though her first snippet of "Heartbreaker". Her first single "Heartbreaker" was released in April 2019 and shared by the rappers Nimo, Moe Phoenix, Sun Diego and Delil Cartel. She reached number 130 in the German Spotify weekly charts, and received coverage from German rap media. Her second single "Korb" was more successful, reaching number 91 on the German Spotify weekly charts.

"Kein Schlaf" with Nimo was Hava's first collaboration with another rapper and was released on 6 December 2019. The single achieved more than 1 million stream views and first place on YouTube and Spotify Germany on its release day. The song also attained gold status in Germany and platinum status in Switzerland. Hava is the fifth German female rapper (after Namika, Juju, Shirin David and Loredana) to reach the top of the Official German Single Charts in the past two years.

She is in a relationship with German rapper Dardan, with whom she became engaged in 2021.

== Discography ==
=== Singles ===
==== As lead artist ====
Title	Year	Peak chart positions			Album
Title	Year	GER	AUT	SWI	Album
"Heartbreaker"	2019	–	–	–	Non-album singles
"Korb"	2019	–	–	–	Non-album singles
"Panamera"	2019	–	–	–	Non-album singles
"Idemo"	2019	–	–	–	Non-album singles
"Nagelneu"	2020	86	–	–	Non-album singles
"Krank"	2020	47	–	93	Weiss
"Weiss"	2020	–	–	–	Weiss
"Auf der Flucht"	2020	61	–	–	Weiss
"Molim"	2020	67	–	84	Weiss
"Schwerelos"	2020	73	–	–	Weiss
"Moje sve"	2021	12	14	14	Segen und Fluch
”Low Battery”	2021	–	–	–	Segen und Fluch
"High" (with Dardan)	2022	7	8	9	Segen und Fluch
"Normal" (with Dardan)	2023	17	29	12	Kein Märchen
"Killa" (with Dardan)	2023	96	–	–	Kein Märchen
"Ja sagen"	2023	7	33	12	Kein Märchen
"Ona nije ja :)" (Remix) (with Jala Brat and Buba Corelli)	2024	–	–	–	Non-album single
"Tu nicht so"	2024	–	–	–	Four Seasons
"Halb perfekt"	2024	–	–	–	Four Seasons
"Jedan dan"	2024	–	–	–	Four Seasons
"Liebe & Hass"	2024	–	–	–	Four Seasons
"Für immer" (with Dardan)	2024	40	–	84	Four Seasons
"Goodbye"	2024	–	–	–	Four Seasons

==== As featured artist ====
Title	Year	Peak chart positions				Album
Title	Year	GER	AUT	CRO Billb.	SWI	Album
"Kein Schlaf" (Nimo featuring Hava)	2019	1	2	—	3	Nimooriginal
"Mailbox" (Dardan featuring Hava)	2020	7	21	—	21	Mister Dardy
"Noć" (Jala Brat featuring Hava)	2021	—	62	8	—	Futura
"Day & Night" (Dardan featuring Hava)	2022	42	—	—	68	DardyNextDoor
"Dale" (Jala Brat and Buba Corelli featuring Hava)	2023	—	38	6	—	GoodFellas
"Odlazim da odem" (Emina Jahović featuring Hava)	2025	—	—	—	—	Svitanje
