= Zemer (disambiguation) =

Zemer is an Israeli Arab town. It may also refer to:

- Hanna Zemer, or Hannah Semer (1925–2003), Israeli journalist
- Moshe Zemer (1932-2011), Israeli Reform Rabbi
- "Zemër" (song), a song by Kosovo-Albanian singer Dhurata Dora and French-Algerian rapper Soolking
- "Zemer" (Tiri song), song by Albanian singer Tahir Gjoci known by the mononym Tiri
- Zemer (Jewish hymn), or z'mer, in Hebrew singular of Zemirot, Jewish hymns, usually sung in the Hebrew or Aramaic languages, but sometimes also in Yiddish or Ladino
