= Ricky Rich =

Swedish Assyrian rapper

Ricky Rich ܪܝܟ̣ܝ ܪܝܟ̣
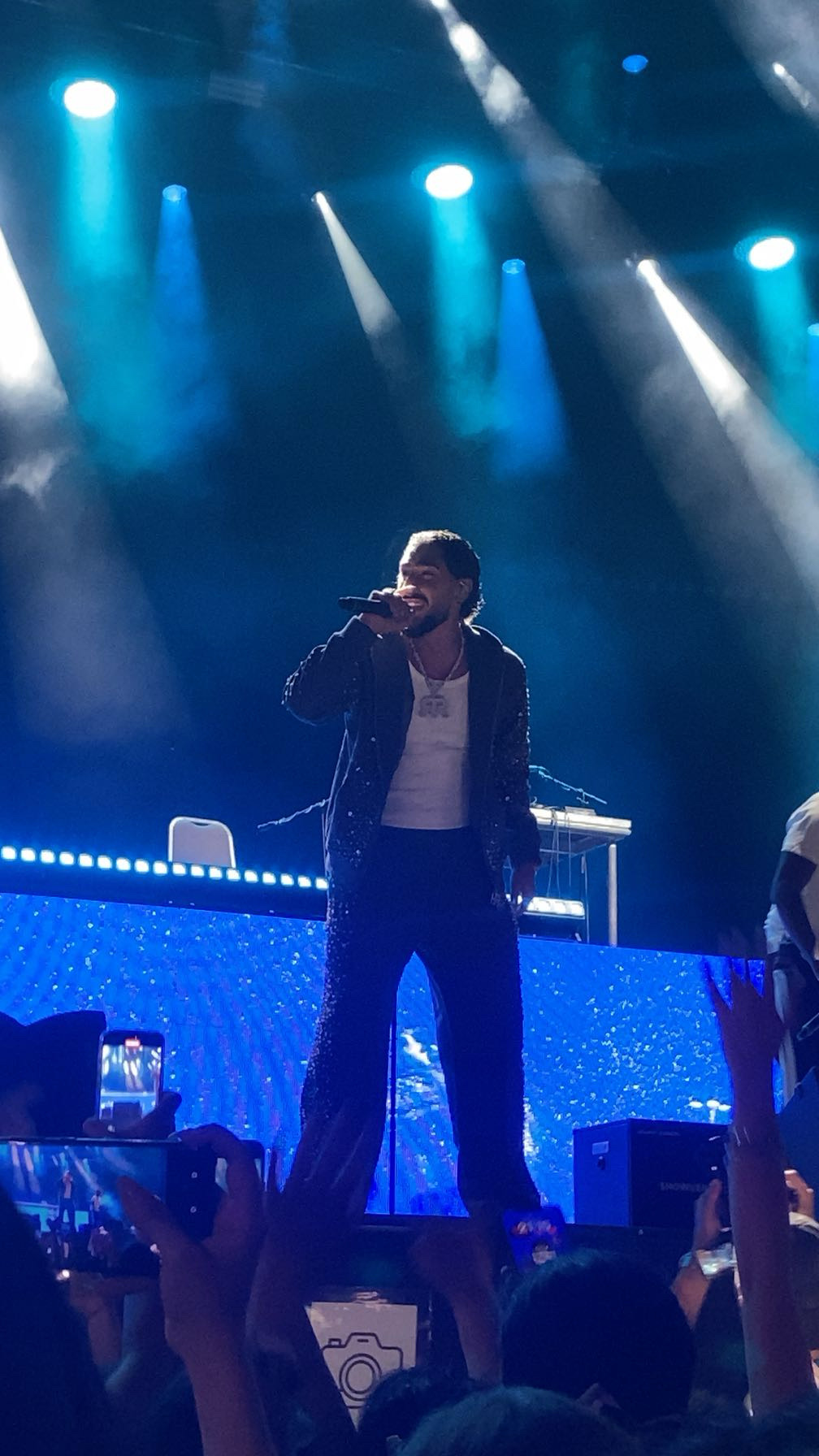
- Rich performing at Kulturfestivalen in Stockholm, August 2025

Background information
- Born: Ricky Haydari Akdoğan; January 26, 1999 (age 27); Västerås, Sweden
- Genre: Hip hop
- Occupations: Rapper, Songwriter
- Instrument: Vocals
- Years active: 2017 - Present

Ricky Haydari Akdoğan, better known as Ricky Rich (Syriac: ܪܝܟ̣ܝ ܪܝܟ̣), is a Swedish rapper. He is considered part of a rising number of successful hip-hop artists coming from Sweden, having initially released his first songs in 2017 and gaining momentum shortly thereafter.

In 2021, his song "Habibi" would achieve new success after going viral on TikTok. Rich is considered part of a growing number of successful rappers in Sweden's Assyrian community alongside Ant Wan, A36, and Gaboro.

== Early life ==
Rich was born on 26 January, 1999 in Västerås, Sweden to an ethnic Assyrian family. He was born with primary ciliary dyskinesia and almost lost his life due to breathing complications.

Rich was first introduced to music at the age of 8, when his father (who was a musician) from Midyat began teaching him songs in Syriac and Turkish, even though he didn't speak Turkish himself. He had previously dreamed of becoming a football player, but due to his condition, Rich had malfunctions with his lung capacity and was unable to pursue sports as a career.

Rich first came into contact with rap music at age 14, when he began recording freestyle music with friends. His father initially disapproved and urged him to prioritize singing instead.

== Career ==
In 2017, Rich released his debut EP "Mitt liv". Ricky Rich collaborated with Aram Mafia (stylized as ARAM Mafia), made up of producers Peter Mrad and Marcus Turan, resulting in a great number of charting hits and songs in 2018 and 2019. On 12 April 2019, Ricky Rich and ARAM Mafia released the album Shhh on the label Spinnup containing many joint hits, notably the title song "Shhh" and the single "Richba". The 7-track EP peaked at number 3 on the Swedish Albums Chart and spent 21 weeks on the chart.

Ricky Rich followed up with his own 6-track solo EP Highs and Lows released on Warner Music Sweden, which peaked in its first week of release at number 7 on the Swedish Albums Chart. The album stayed for a total of 7 weeks in the chart. Following the release of the EP, Rich would release acoustic interpretations of some of the songs included, titled Crib Sessions Pt. 1.

In 2021, Rich's song "Habibi" became a sleeper hit after going viral on TikTok, charting in Germany, Austria, Switzerland, as well as Sweden, and playing heavily on many other Scandinavian and European radio stations. The song had previously been popular when it was first released, achieving 6.8 million streams on Spotify and 3.4 million views on YouTube in early 2018. He had explained the popularity of the song coming as a surprise, and in light of the song's newfound success, Rich released the music video for the song in the same year. Shot in Berlin, the video follows Rich and his girlfriend exploring the city by day, driving in a car by night, and relaxing at a luxury apartment in between. Later that year, he held a performance at the Westfield Mall of Scandinavia to present a new collaboration with Gims.

In 2022, Rich released his debut studio album, Rico Suave. Rich cited his inspiration for the album as wanting a stable life outside of the glamorous lifestyle he accrued from his success, wanting to close that chapter and move forward. The album explores the character of Rico as an alter ego who enjoys a lustful life without seeing the consequences, and contains 10 tracks.

In 2025, Rich collaborated with Swedish Kosovo-Albanian singer Dafina Zeqiri on the song "Zemër ty". Later in July, he performed a concert at the "Fabric" Discotheque in Mitrovica, Kosovo. In November, Rich released the single "Wenki (Corazón)"; he had previously released the singles "Mi Amor" with Nassif Zeytoun in January and "Någon kommer älska dig igen" with Swedish singer/songwriter Molly Hammar in February.

== Personal life ==
Rich currently lives in Västerås. He has two older sisters. Due to his condition, his heart is inverted and his lung capacity rests at 40%.

Rich married his wife Cecilia Bahar in a 2022 ceremony held in Spain, with guests such as Jireel present. On 15 November, 2025, Rich announced the birth of his first child via Instagram.

== Discography ==
=== Studio albums ===
Title	Year	Peak chart positions
Title	Year	SWE
Rico Suave	2022	10

=== EPs ===
Title	Year	Peak chart positions
Title	Year	SWE
Pudiyavna	2020	7
Crib Sessions Pt. 1	2020	—

=== Singles ===
Title	Year	Peak chart positions					Album
Title	Year	SWE	AUT	LBN Air.	GER	SWI	Album
"Förbjuden frukt" (with Nineb Youk and Jeano featuring Kids of Revolution)	2018	34	—	—	—	—	Non-album singles
"Bli bättre" (with Kids of Revolution)	2019	21	—	—	—	—	Non-album singles
"Million" (with Ardian Bujupi and Kids of Revolution)	2019	42	—	—	—	—	Non-album singles
"Portugal"	2019	67	—	—	—	—	Non-album singles
"Mirakel" (with Kids of Revolution)	2020	42	—	—	—	—	Non-album singles
"Bless Me"	2020	27	—	—	—	—	Non-album singles
"Ma chérie"	2020	29	—	—	—	—	Highs & Lows
"Highs & Lows"	2020	37	—	—	—	—	Highs & Lows
"2vs2" (with Blizzy)	2020	38	—	—	—	—	Phoenix Pt. 2
"Ice"	2021	10	—	—	—	—	Non-album singles
"Habibi" (with Dardan and Zuna)	2021	—	52	—	29	46	Non-album singles
"Ah Anne" (with DnoteOnDaBeat and Sinan)	2021	— (Note: "Ah Anne" did not enter the Swedish Singles Chart, but peaked at number six on the Swedish Heatseeker chart.)	—	—	—	—	Non-album singles
"Guitar" (with Blizzy)	2021	52	—	—	—	—	Non-album singles
"Falling Bird"	2021	71	—	—	—	—	Non-album singles
"Dybala" (remix) (with K27 and Jireel)	2021	49	—	—	—	—	Non-album singles
"Who"	2021	47	—	—	—	—	Non-album singles
"Say Oui" (with Gims)	2021	22	—	—	—	—	Non-album singles
"Better Day" (with Jireel, Jelassi, Mona Masrour and A36)	2021	66	—	—	—	—	Non-album singles
"Young 22"	2022	37	—	—	—	—	Non-album singles
"Qué Te"	2022	78	—	—	—	—	Non-album singles
"Barcelona"	2022	66	—	—	—	—	Non-album singles
"All I Need" (featuring Franglish)	2022	87	—	—	—	—	Non-album singles
"Ratata"	2023	48	—	—	—	—	Non-album singles
"Banana" (with Dani M)	2023	52	—	—	—	—	Non-album singles
"Bad Girl" (with Nineb Youk)	2023	88	—	—	—	—	Non-album singles
"Holy Father"	2023	96	—	—	—	—	Non-album singles
"Chicano" (with Blizzy)	2024	24	—	—	—	—	Non-album singles
"Ya Zina (Guapa)"	2024	74	—	—	—	—	Non-album singles
"Mi Amor" (with Nassif Zeytoun)	2025	—	—	20	—	—	Non-album singles
"Någon kommer älska dig igen" (with Molly Hammar)	2025	48	—	—	—	—	Non-album singles
"Zemër ty" (with Dafina Zeqiri)	2025	70	—	—	—	—	Non-album singles
"Wenki (Corazón)"	2025	— (Note: "Wenki (Corazón)" did not enter the Swedish Singles Chart, but peaked at number 3 on the Swedish Heatseeker chart.)	—	—	—	—	Non-album singles

=== Featured singles ===
Title	Year	Peak chart positions	Album
Title	Year	SWE	Album
"Ryser" (Lani Mo featuring Ricky Rich)	2017	63	Låt oss leva
"Para" (remix) (Lani Mo featuring Ricky Rich, Thrife, Dree Low, Blizzy and Nathan K)	2018	53	Non-album singles
"Ku je ti" (Dystinct featuring Ricky Rich and Dafina Zeqiri)	2023	54	Non-album singles

=== Other charting songs ===
Title	Year	Peak chart positions	Album
Title	Year	SWE	Album
"Delli" (featuring Adel)	2020	40	Highs & Lows
"Panama"	2020	— (Note: "Panama" did not enter the Swedish Singles Chart, but peaked at number five on the Swedish Heatseeker chart.)	Highs & Lows
"Mosades" (with Nineb Youk)	2021	63	Life Is Hard
"Sin City" (with Dree Low)	2021	65	Priceless
"F4L"	2022	— (Note: "F4L" did not enter the Swedish Singellista Chart, but peaked at number six on the Swedish Heatseeker Chart.)	Rico Suave

== Discography: Ricky Rich & ARAM Mafia ==
=== EPs ===
(Credited jointly as Ricky Rich & ARAM Mafia)

Title	Year	Peak chart positions	Certification
Title	Year	SWE	Certification
Shhh	2020	3	

=== Singles and other charting songs ===
(All songs credited jointly as Ricky Rich & ARAM Mafia)

Title	Year	Peak chart positions				Album / EP
Title	Year	SWE	AUT	GER	SWI	Album / EP
"Habibi"	2017	29	33	29	24	Non-album single
"Min diamant"	2018	19	—	—	—	Non-album single
"Vinner"	2018	35	—	—	—	Non-album single
"Instaprofil"	2018	30	—	—	—	Non-album single
"Abonnenten (Hey Babe)"	2019	25	—	—	—	Non-album single
"Shhh"	2019	47	—	—	—	Shhh
"Rika"	2019	19	—	—	—	Shhh
"Bonita"	2019	64	—	—	—	Shhh
"Bäst"	2019	57	—	—	—	Shhh
