= Prends ma main =

Single by Gims featuring Vitaa

from the album Le Fléau
- Released: 8 October 2021
- Recorded: 2021
- Length: 3:17
- Label: Play Two, Chahawat, Sony Music
- Songwriter(s): Gims
- Producer(s): Gims

Gims singles chronology
"Only You" (2021)	"Prends ma main" (2021)

Vitaa singles chronology
"XY" (2021)	"Prends ma main" (2021)

Music video
- "Prends ma main" on YouTube

"Prends ma main" is a song by Congolese singer and rapper Gims featuring vocals from French singer Vitaa. It was released on 8 October 2021 and its music video was released 19 November 2021.

== Charts ==
Chart (2021)	Peak position
Belgium (Ultratop 50 Wallonia)	44
France (SNEP)	74

== Release history ==
Region	Date	Format
France	8 October 2021	Digital download
