= Dream Girl (Butrint Imeri and Nimo song) =

2019 single by Butrint Imeri and Nimo

Single by Butrint Imeri and Nimo
- Released: 2 August 2019
- Genre: Hip hop/Rap
- Length: 2:45
- Label: 385idéal
- Songwriters: Big Bang; Butrint Imeri; Nimo
- Producers: Big Bang; Butrint Imeri; Nimo

Butrint Imeri singles chronology
"Hajt Hajt" (2019)	"Dream Girl" (2019)	"M'ke rrejt" (2019)

Nimo singles chronology
"Blue Lagoon" (2019)	"Dream Girl" (2019)	"J-Lo" (2019)

Music video
- "Dream Girl" on YouTube

"Dream Girl" is a song recorded by Kosovo Albanian singer Butrint Imeri and German rapper Nimo, released as a single on 2 August 2019 by Universal URBAN. It was entirely written by both aforementioned artists together with Albanian producer Big Bang, who additionally handled the production process for the record. The official music video for the song was shot by Supercut Studio and was uploaded by AVD Digital onto YouTube on 1 August 2019 in order to accompany the single's release. It portrays the artists sailing across the sea by boat, afterwards in a mansion with a pool surrounded by women throughout the clip.

== Background and composition ==
Lasting two minutes and forty five seconds, "Dream Girl" was written by Butrint Imeri and Nimo alongside Kosovo-Albanian producer Big Bang, while the latter solely handled the production process for the song. It was composed in 4/4 time and is performed in the key of G♭ major in common time with a tempo of 102 beats per minute.

== Music video ==
The accompanying music video for "Dream Girl" was premiered onto the YouTube channel of Imeri's label AVD Digital one day before the digital release on the 1 August 2019.

== Personnel ==
Credits adapted from YouTube and Tidal.

- Big Bang – producing, composing, songwriting
- Butrint Imeri – producing, composing, songwriting
- Nimo – producing, composing, songwriting

== Charts ==
Chart (2019)	Peak position
Albania (The Top List)	6
Austria (Ö3 Austria Top 40)	72
Germany (GfK)	41
Switzerland (Schweizer Hitparade)	48

== Release history ==
Region	Date	Format(s)	Label	Ref.
Various	2 August 2019	Digital download; streaming	385idéal	
