= Le fléau =

Studio album by Gims
- Released: 4 December 2020
- Recorded: 2020–2021
- Genre: Hip hop; pop
- Label: TF1 Group; Play Two; Sony Music; Géante Rouge; Indifférence Prod

Gims chronology
Ceinture noire (2018)	Le fléau (2020)	LDVM (2022)

Singles from Le fléau
- 1. "Yolo" Released: 28 August 2020; 2. "Immortel" Released: 25 September 2020; 3. "Origami" Released: 23 October 2020; 4. "Oro Jackson" Released: 6 November 2020; 5. "Jusqu'ici tout va bien" Released: 6 November 2020; 6. "Sicario" Released: 11 December 2020; 7. "GJS" Released: 5 April 2021; 8. "Belle" Released: 5 April 2021; 9. "Only You" Released: 28 May 2021; 10. "Prends ma main" Released: 8 October 2021

Le fléau (English: The Plague or The Scourge) is the fourth studio album by Congolese-French singer and rapper Gims, released on 4 December 2020 on the TF1 Group and Play Two labels. A reissue entitled Les vestiges du fléau (English: The Remnants of the Scourge) was published on 28 May 2021. A second reissue titled L'Empire de Méroé was released on 3 December 2021.

== Genesis ==
During confinement, Gims announces on a live Instagram a 100% rap album for the month of October 2020. According to some publications on his Instagram, Gims reveals that his album would be an 80% rap album contrary to what had been announced.

== History ==
On 28 August 2020, Gims published on streaming platforms the single "Yolo". on 2 September 2020, the music video of "Yolo" was released. on 21 September 2020, he posted a video on social networks announcing the first single from the album, "Immortel", for 25 September 2020. On 25 September 2020, Gims released "Immortel", a purely rap sound where we find a Gims from the time of the Sexion d'Assaut. At the end of the video clip the album was announced for 6 November 2020.

On 23 October 2020, he published on streaming platforms the single "Origami". on 30 October 2020, the track listing was unveiled; the full album also leaked on the Internet one week before its release. On 3 November 2020, through his social networks, Gims postponed the album because of the COVID-19 pandemic but no date was announced.

On 6 November 2020, Gims released "Oro Jackson" in collaboration with Gazo as well as "Jusqu'ici tout va bien", which also serves as the theme song of the TF1 series, Ici tout commence. On 7 November 2020, he issued the video clip of "Oro Jackson" on 10 November 2020, he released the music video for the track "Origami". On 26 November 2020, he announced on social media that the album would be released on 4 December 2020.

On 2 December 2020, the new track listing for the album was revealed, with 17 tracks including nine collaborations with the rappers Vald, Kaaris, Heuss l'Enfoiré, Leto, Bosh and Gazo. On 3 December 2020, Gims released the music video for "Jusqu'ici tout va bien". On 11 December 2020, he released the music video for "Sicario" in collaboration with Heuss l'Enfoiré. on 5 April 2021, he published the song "GJS" in collaboration with Jul and SCH, as well as the song "Belle", in collaboration with Dadju and Slimane. "Belle"'s music video was released at the end of the day.

On 28 April 2021, Gims announced the reissue of the album, titled Les vestiges du fléau, which was released on 28 May 2021. On 19 May 2021, he published the track listing, consisting of 10 tracks including eight collaborations and two solo songs. Among the guests of the reissue, in addition to Jul, SCH, Dadju and Slimane, participate, in particular, international singers such as the Egyptian Mohamed Ramadan, the Tanzanian Rayvanny as well as the German-Albanian singer Dhurata Dora. on 28 May 2021, the same day as the release of the reissue, Gims released the clip of "only You" in collaboration with the German-Albanian singer Dhurata Dora.

On 8 October 2021, he released a single in collaboration with Vitaa named "Prends ma main". On 4 November 2021, Gims announced the second reissue of the album on his YouTube channel, titled L'Empire de Méroé with a release date of 3 December.

== Track listing ==
Le fléau track listing
No.	Title	Writer(s)	Producer(s)	Length
1.	"Intro"	Gims	Gims; Bugatti Beatz; Julien Collier; Patry	1:31
2.	"Immortel"	Gims	Gims; Yalatif Beatz	3:12
3.	"Côté noir" (feat. Leto)	Gims; Leto	Takeshi-San	3:51
4.	"Oats" (feat. Boumidjal X)	Gims	Boumidjal X	2:57
5.	"Pendejo" (feat. Bosh)	Gims; Bosh	Boumidjal X	3:20
6.	"Origami" (feat. X Nilo Virus)	Gims; X Nilo Virus; Adja Dante	Gims; Boumidjal X	3:36
7.	"Yolo"	Gims	Boumidjal X	3:18
8.	"Oro Jackson" (feat. Gazo)	Gims; Gazo	Gims; Boumidjal X	3:00
9.	"Twenny Twenny" (feat. Tifyala)	Gims	Gims; Yalatif Beatz	2:40
10.	"Og na Og"	Gims	Gims; Boumidjal X	2:51
11.	"Sicario" (feat. Heuss l'Enfoiré)	Gims; Heuss l'Enfoiré	Gims; Bugatti Beatz	3:39
12.	"Jusqu'ici tout va bien"	Gims; Vitaa	Gims; Renaud Rebillaud	3:55
13.	"Jetez pas l'oeil" (feat. Vald)	Gims; Vald	Gims; Boumidjal X	3:10
14.	"Grosse Bleta" (feat. Kaaris)	Gims; Kaaris	Gims; Yalatif Beatz	3:31
15.	"Dans ma tête" (feat. Jaekers)	Gims; Jaekers	Gims; Fux; Bugatti Beatz	3:09
16.	"C’est comme ça"	Gims	Gims; Boumidjal X	3:07
17.	"Thomas Shelby"	Gims	Gims; Boumidjal X	2:33
Total length:				50:00

=== Rééditions ===
Les vestiges du fléau track listing
No.	Title	Writer(s)	Producer(s)	Length
1.	"GJS" (feat. Jul & SCH)	Gims; Jul; SCH	Gims; Boumidjal X	4:08
2.	"C’est quoi l’del" (feat. Nekfeu)	Gims; Nekfeu	Loubensky	2:58
3.	"Dévoilé" (feat. Inso le Véritable)	Gims; Inso le Véritable	Boumidjal X	3:29
4.	"Ça fait mal" (feat. Naza)	Gims; Naza	Boumidjal X	2:50
5.	"C’est fini" (feat. Mohamed Ramadan)	Gims; Mohamed Ramadan	Yalatif Beatz	3:00
6.	"Señorita" (feat. Rayvanny)	Gims; Rayvanny	S2Kizzy	3:00
7.	"Only You" (feat. Dhurata Dora)	Gims; Dadju; Dhurata Dora	Young Bouba; Fux	3:38
8.	"Belle" (feat. Dadju & Slimane)	Riccardo Cocciante; Luc Plamondon	Renaud Rebillaud	4:21
9.	"Sans limite"	Gims	Renaud Rebillaud	3:40
10.	"Dis-moi tout"	Gims	Renaud Rebillaud	3:34
11.	"C'est fini - Arabic Version" (feat. Mohamed Ramadan)	Gims; Mohamed Ramadan	Yalatif Beatz	2:59
Total length:				37:37

L'Empire de Méroé track listing
No.	Title	Writer(s)	Producer(s)	Length
1.	"Prends ma main" (featuring Vitaa)	Gims; Vitaa	Renaud Rebillaud	3:16
2.	"Ma bébé"	Gims	Bugatti Beatz	2:17
3.	"MG"	Gims	Young Bouba; Tendry	2:51
4.	"Enfants de la patrie" (featuring Naps)	Gims; Naps	Young Bouba	2:44
5.	"Dayé"	Gims	Yalatif Beatz	2:55

== Notes ==
- "Yolo" is inspired by the Congolese origins of Gims. The title is named for his childhood neighborhood in Kinshasa in the Democratic Republic of the Congo.
- The title of "Oro Jackson" is strongly inspired by the Japanese manga One Piece of which Gims is a big fan. Indeed, it is the ship of the legendary pirate Gol D. Roger, the pirate king.
- In Oro Jackson's music video, we can note the appearance of H-Magnum, 1nsolent, Landy, Abou Tall, Guy2Bezbar and Bedjik, Gims's brother.
- The "Jusqu'ici tout va bien" music video was shot in parts of Paris' 9th arrondissement, where Gims made his debut with Sexion d'Assaut.

=== Immortel ===
The "Immortel" music video has a committed vision as it is inspired by several injustices known to mankind:

- The death of Lige Daniels, a 16-year-old African American boy. The latter was killed by hanging on 3 August 1920 by the Ku Klux Klan, which accused him of having killed an old woman.
- The guillotined death of French lawyer, journalist and revolutionary Camille Desmoulins on 5 April 1794, at the age of 34. The murder of George Floyd, a 46-year-old African-American man by a white policeman, Derek Chauvin, during an arrest 25 May 2020.
- The altercation between the police and the young people directly alludes to the riots in the French riots, which began in Clichy-sous-Bois following the deaths of Zyed Benna and Bouna Traoré on 27 October 2005. The latter were electrocuted in the area. enclosure of an electrical substation after escaping during a police check. On this same scene, we can note the appearance of Kaaris and Soso Maness.
- The elephant in the clip is personified by the state. On his Snapchat story, Gims, disguised as a peasant in this part of the clip, explained that this elephant is the source of everything the government can do to its citizens. He explains that the peasant is crushed by debts or even taxes despite his living environment. He also explains that the latter do not forget anyone and that everyone is tracked, which is represented by the memory of the elephant.
- The eye of the parallel world in which Gims finds himself is personified by the Internet. In his Snapchat story, he explains that this eye is the source of several cyberbullying that ended in suicides because of social networks. One can think of the death of Amanda Todd, a 16-year-old Canadian teenager, who committed suicide in her home on 10 October 2012, as a result of the harassment she suffered.
- The death of George Stinney, a 14-year-old African American boy. The latter was electrocuted on 16 June 1944 following the murders of two white girls: Betty June Binnicker, aged 11 and Mary Emma Thames, aged 8. He will therefore be cleared 70 years later after his execution.
- The death of Eddie Slovik, a 24-year-old US Army soldier in World War II. The latter was killed on 31 January 1945 for desertion by the American military police. He is therefore the only American soldier to have been shot for desertion during World War II.

=== Samples ===
- "Origami" is a sample of the song Maché Bécif from the Franco-Kabyle reggae group Dub Inc.
- "Jetez pas l'oeil" is a sample of two songs by American rappers ("Sicko Mode" by Travis Scott featuring Drake and "Plain Jane" by ASAP Ferg).
- "Dans ma tête" is a sample of the song "Cry Me a River" by Justin Timberlake.
- "Belle" is a cover of the song of the same title released in 1998 and performed by Patrick Fiori, Daniel Lavoie & Garou.

== Personnel ==
- Sound recording and reproduction – Fux Cartel, Paris, France
- Audio engineer – Fux Cartel
- Audio engineer ("Oats", "Twenny Twenny", "Jetez pas l'oeil") – Moustafa
- Audio engineer ("Jusqu'ici tout va bien") – Renaud Rebillaud
- Audio mixing ("Oats", "Pendejo", "Oro Jackson", "Og Na Og", "C'est comme ça") – Boumidjal WWD
- Audio mixing ("Origami") – 20 100
- Audio mixing ("Jusqu'ici tout va bien") – Jérémie Tuil
- Mastering – Julien Courtois
- Mastering ("Jusqu'ici tout va bien") – Masterdisk Europe, Paris, Île-de-France, France
- Photography – Odieuxboby
- Album cover – Meni Designs

== Charts ==
=== Weekly charts ===
Chart (2020–2021)	Peak position
Belgian Albums (Ultratop Wallonia)	7
French Albums (SNEP)	1
Swiss Albums (Schweizer Hitparade)	14

=== Year-end charts ===
Chart (2020)	Position
French Albums (SNEP)	32
Chart (2021)	Position
Belgian Albums (Ultratop Wallonia)	43
French Albums (SNEP)	29
Chart (2022)	Position
French Albums (SNEP)	136

== Certifications ==
Region	Certification	Certified units/sales
France (SNEP)	2× Platinum	200,000^{‡}
^{‡} Sales+streaming figures based on certification alone.
