= Jusqu'ici tout va bien =

Single by Gims

from the album Le Fléau
- Released: 3 December 2020
- Genre: Pop
- Length: 3:54
- Label: Play Two, Chahawat, Sony Music
- Producer(s): Renaud Rebillaud

Gims singles chronology
"Sicario" (2020)	"Jusqu'ici tout va bien" (2020)	"Jetez pas l'oeil" (2020)

Music video
- "Jusqu'ici tout va bien" on YouTube

"Jusqu'ici tout va bien" (So far all is well) is a song by Congolese singer and rapper Gims, released on 6 November 2020. The song is the fifth single from the album Le Fléau. It also serves as the credits for Ici tout commence series.

== Music video ==
The video clip is released on 3 December 2020 and shows Gims walking around Paris. It also features "everyday heroes" such as a schoolteacher, a dentist, a food bank volunteer, a pastry chef or a nurse.

== Live performances ==
Gims performed the song in the program Le Grand Échiquier on 2 February 2021. He also performed it during the Symphonie pour la vie broadcast on France 3 on 10 February 2021.

== Charts ==
=== Weekly charts ===
Weekly chart performance for "Jusqu'ici tout va bien"
Chart (2020)	Peak position
Belgium (Ultratop 50 Wallonia)	1
France (SNEP)	9
Switzerland (Schweizer Hitparade)	9

=== Year-end charts ===
Year-end chart performance for "Jusqu'ici tout va bien"
Chart (2021)	Position
Belgium (Ultratop Wallonia)	33
France (SNEP)	136
