= Cledos =

Finish rapper

- Born: 11 December 1998 (age 27); Helsinki, Finland
- Genre: Trap
- Years active: 2017–present
- Labels: PME, Warner Finland

Vladislav Andreevich Heponen, known professionally as Cledos, is a Finnish rapper.

== Biography ==
Born in East Helsinki, he first gained attention with the release of his single Töis. While Heponen had no previous experience in rapping, his friend who worked in the music industry suggested that they should make a song. It was published in 2017 and included in his first mixtape Boboff Tape, which entered the top ten of Suomen virallinen lista. The lyrics contained various inside jokes from his group of friends, slang and slapstick. Impressed by the public's response to the song, several record companies and producers became interested, and Cledos signed with the record label PME Records. In November 2017, Cledos released his debut EP with six songs titled Alo, which entered Spotify's top 50.

In the following years, he signed a record deal with the Finnish division of Warner Music Group, on which he released his first studio album, Ceissi, topping the national charts for two consecutive weeks, staying over one year on the charts and certified Platinum, with over 20,000 units sold in Finland. The idea behind the concept album was to showcase a story with two different styles of music. He also reached number one on hit parade with his single Kysymys.

In 2021 he published the EP Kazama, which debuted in the top five. Also his track Ring Ring, featuring William, entered the national top twenty at number 13. Furthermore he recorded a remix version of Samma gamla vanliga by Swedish rapper A36, certified Platinum, which later became his second number one of Suomen virallinen lista for thirteen consecutive weeks.

At the annual Emma-gaala awards, he got three nominations, notably one as Artist of the year.

== Discography ==
=== Studio albums ===
- 2020 – Ceissi
- 2023 – Euro Musik

=== EPs ===
- 2017 – Alo
- 2021 – Kazama
- 2024 – #Ultra

=== Mixtapes ===
- 2018 – Boboff Tape

=== Singles ===
- 2017 – Töis (feat. Deezydavid)
- 2017 – Safe
- 2018 – Made in Italy (feat. Mikael Gabriel)
- 2018 – Swipe (feat. MDS, Tippa, Gracias, Bizi & Mikael Gabriel)
- 2019 – Pidäkii
- 2019 – Tän kaa (feat. Bizi)
- 2020 – Kysymys (feat. Pyhimys)
- 2020 – Kilo (feat. Gettomasa)
- 2021 – Life (Sun luo) (feat. Behm)
- 2021 – Samma gamla vanliga (Remix) (feat. A36, Averagekidluke and Ibe)
- 2022 – City (feat. A36)
- 2022 – Mis oot ollu (feat. Fabe)
- 2023 – Kauemmas (feat. ibe)
- 2023 – Anteeks
- 2023 – Kuka se on (feat. Isac Elliot)
- 2023 – Jos mä oisin sä
- 2024 – Kysyinksmä? (feat. Turisti)
- 2024 – Kattomatta takas (feat. Etta)
- 2024 - Leipä
- 2024 – Me Vs. Maailma (feat. Sexmane)
- 2026 – Nene
- 2026 – Ajaton (feat. Gettomasa)
- 2026 – Aito Freak

=== Collaborations ===
- 2022 – 20min (Isac Elliot feat. William & Cledos)
- 2022 – kilsoi (Cledos x Jambo)
