= Immortel (song) =

Single by Gims

from the album Le Fléau
- Released: 25 September 2020
- Genre: Hip-hop
- Length: 3:12
- Label: Play Two, Chahawat, Sony Music
- Producer(s): Fux Cartel

Gims singles chronology
"Yolo" (2020)	"Immortel" (2020)	"Origami" (2020)

Music video
- "Immortel" on YouTube

"Immortel" (Immortal) is a song hy Congolese singer and rapper Gims. It was released on 25 September 2020 as the second single of his album Le Fléau.

On 21 September 2020, he posted a video on these social networks announcing the first single from the album titled Immortel.

== Video clip ==
The "Immortal" music video has a committed vision as it is inspired by several injustices known to mankind:

The death of Lige Daniels, a 16-year-old African American boy. The latter was killed by hanging on 3 August 1920 by the Ku Klux Klan, which accused him of having killed an old woman.

The guillotined death of French lawyer, journalist and revolutionary Camille Desmoulins on 5 April 1794, at the age of 34. The murder of George Floyd, a 46-year-old African-American man, at the hands of Derek Chauvin, a white police officer on 25 May 2020.

The altercation between the police and the young people directly alludes to the riots in the French riots, which began in Clichy-sous-Bois following the deaths of Zyed Benna and Bouna Traoré on 27 October 2005. The latter were electrocuted in the area. enclosure of an electrical substation after escaping during a police check. On this same scene, we can note the appearance of Kaaris and Soso Maness.

The elephant in the clip is personified by the state. On his Snapchat story, Gims, disguised as a peasant in this part of the clip, explained that this elephant is the source of everything the government can do to its citizens. He explains that the peasant is crushed by debts or even taxes despite his living environment. He also explains that the latter do not forget anyone and that everyone is tracked, which is represented by the memory of the elephant.

The eye of the parallel world in which Gims finds himself is personified by the Internet. In his Snapchat story, he explains that this eye is the source of several cyberbullying that ended in suicides because of social networks. One can think of the death of Amanda Todd, a 16-year-old Canadian teenager, who committed suicide in her home on 10 October 2012, as a result of the harassment she suffered.

The death of George Stinney, a 14-year-old African American boy. The latter was electrocuted on 16 June 1944 following the murders of two white girls: Betty June Binnicker, aged 11 and Mary Emma Thames, aged 8. He will therefore be cleared 70 years later after his execution.

The death of Eddie Slovik, a 24-year-old US Army soldier in World War II. The latter was killed on 31 January 1945 for desertion by the American military police. He is therefore the only American soldier to have been shot for desertion during World War II.

== Charts ==
Chart (2020–21)	Peak position
France (SNEP)	99

== Release history ==
Region	Date	Format
France	25 September 2020	Digital download
