= Slide (Bosh song) =

2020 song by Bosh

Single by Bosh
- Language: French
- Released: 23 October 2020
- Genre: Pop; funk; french hip hop
- Length: 2:25
- Label: Arista
- Songwriters: Mounir Maarouf; Blaise Batisse; Bosh

Bosh singles chronology
"Djomb" (2020)	"Slide" (2020)

Music video
- Bosh - Slide (Clip officiel) on YouTube

"Slide" is a song performed by French singer Bosh released in 2020.

== Charts ==
Chart performance for "Slide"
Chart (2020)	Peak position
Belgium (Ultratip Bubbling Under Wallonia)	10
France (SNEP)	12

== Certifications ==
Certifications for "Slide"
Region	Certification	Certified units/sales
France (SNEP)	Platinum	200,000^{‡}
^{‡} Sales+streaming figures based on certification alone.
