= Butrint Imeri =

Albanian singer and songwriter (born 1996)

- Born: 3 July 1996 (age 30); Lörrach, Germany
- Genres: R&B; Pop
- Occupations: Singer; songwriter
- Instrument: Vocals
- Years active: 2015–present
- Labels: 96 Management; Yellowcake Music Group; Universal

Butrint Imeri (Albanian: [buˈtɾint iˈmɛɾi]; born 2 July 1996) is a Kosovan singer and songwriter.

== Life and career ==
=== 1996–present: Early life and continued success ===
Butrint Imeri was born on 3 July 1996 into an Albanian family from Kçiq, a village in Mitrovica, Kosovo, in the city of Lörrach, Germany. He started dancing at the age of 8 shortly after he enrolled in dance classes in his hometown. Imeri first rose to national fame as he debuted with the singles, "Ki me lyp", "Merre zemrën tem" and "Eja Eja", with whom he received significant recognition in the Albanian-speaking Balkans. He later released four additional singles, including "E jona" and "Delicious", the latter in collaboration with Greek singer Eleni Foureira, which peaked at number five in Albania. Imeri's chart success followed into 2017 with "Bella" and his first number one single in Albania "Xhanem".

In 2019, Imeri collaborated with Kosovo-Albanian rapper Majk on "Sa gjynah" and reached number one in Albania. Another pair of top ten singles in his native country, "Hajt Hajt" and "M'ke rrejt", followed in the same year. "Dream Girl", a collaboration with German rapper Nimo released under 385idéal, was successful, including in Austria, Germany and Switzerland. In 2020, Imeri collaborated with Kosovo-Albanian singer Ermal Fejzullahu on his follow-up single, "Për një Dashuri", which peaked at number two. He further released "Si përpara" and "Dy zemra", the latter in collaboration with Kosovo-Albanian singer Nora Istrefi. The follow-up release, "Phantom", went on to reach number one in Albania.

On 21 January 2023, Imeri released "Lule e dashnisë" and achieved number 79 in Switzerland. Another release, "Diskoteka", debuted on 28 April, securing positions at number 28 in Greece and number 6 in Switzerland. Subsequently, "Moj dashni" released on 28 July, attained a chart position of 71 in Switzerland. Collaborating with Kosovo-Albanian singer Era Istrefi, Imeri released "Lonely" on 24 November and saw chart success, reaching number 29 in Albania and number 95 in Switzerland.

== Artistry ==
The musical work of Imeri is often defined as R&B and pop. He has cited Justin Timberlake as his major musical influence and stated that he is a fan of Elvana Gjata.

== Discography ==
=== Compilation album ===
List of compilation albums, with details
Title	Album details
Acoustic Sessions	Released: 10 May 2020; Label: AVD Digital; Formats: Digital download and streaming

=== Singles ===
==== As lead artist ====
List of singles as lead artist, with selected chart positions
Title	Year	Peak chart positions					Album
Title	Year	ALB	AUT	GER	GRE	SWI	Album
"Ki me lyp" (featuring Real 1 and Dj Blunt)	2015	—N/a	—	—	—	—	Non-album single
"Merre zemrën tem"	2015	—N/a	—	—	—	—	Non-album single
"Eja Eja"	2016	—	—	—	—	—	Non-album single
"E jona"	2016	2	—	—	—	—	Non-album single
"Delicious" (featuring Eleni Foureira)	2016	5	—	—	—	—	Non-album single
"Papa" (featuring Elinel)	2016	—	—	—	—	—	Non-album single
"Veç për mu"	2016	4	—	—	—	—	Non-album single
"Mona Lisa"	2017	9	—	—	—	—	Non-album single
"Bella"	2017	2	—	—	—	—	Non-album single
"Xhanem"	2017	1	—	—	—	—	Non-album single
"Ma Chérie"	2018	6	—	—	—	—	Non-album single
"Alea"	2018	5	—	—	—	—	Non-album single
"Kush?"	2018	1	—	—	—	—	Non-album single
"Bakllava" (featuring Gjiko)	2018	1	—	—	—	—	Non-album single
"Hajt Hajt"	2019	2	—	—	—	—	Non-album single
"Dream Girl" (featuring Nimo)	2019	6	72	41	—	48	Non-album single
"M'ke rrejt"	2019	1	—	—	—	—	Non-album single
"Për një dashuri" (with Ermal Fejzullahu)	2020	2	—	—	—	—	Non-album single
"Si përpara"	2020	6	—	—	—	—	Non-album single
"Dy zemra" (featuring Nora Istrefi)	2020	2	—	—	—	—	Non-album single
"Phantom"	2020	1	—	—	—	—	Non-album single
"Sugar (Remix)" (with Anatu and Zubi)	2021	—	—	—	—	—	Non-album single
"Dujëm"	2021	—	—	—	—	85	Non-album single
"Dale" (with Kida and Ledri Vula)	2021	1	—	—	—	13	Non-album single
"Kuku"	2021	3	44	—	—	8	Non-album single
"Corazon" (featuring Don Xhoni)	2021	5	—	—	—	35	Non-album single
"Pare" (with Tayna and Mozzik)	2022	—	—	—	—	11	Non-album single
"AM" (with Kida)	2022	25	—	—	—	48	Non-album single
"PM" (with Kida)	2022	25	—	—	—	61	Non-album single
"Lejla"	2022	—	—	—	—	25	Non-album single
"Cigaren"	2022	—	—	—	—	55	Non-album single
"Lule e dashnisë"	2023	—	—	—	—	79	Non-album single
"Diskoteka"	2023	—	—	—	28	6	Non-album single
"Moj dashni"	2023	—	—	—	—	71	Non-album single
"Lonely" (with Era Istrefi)	2023	29	—	—	—	95	Non-album single
"Gaboi" (with Stealth & Vinz)	2023	—	—	—	—	—	Non-album single
"Psikopat"	2024	—	—	—	—	43	Non-album single
"Tu menu"	2024	—	—	—	—	44	Non-album single
"Princesa"	2024	—	—	—	—	—	Non-album single
"Malli"	2024	—	—	—	—	—	Non-album single
"Luj" (with Dystinct)	2024	—	—	—	—	—	Non-album single
"—" denotes a recording that did not chart or was not released in that territory.

==== As featured artist ====
List of singles as featured artist, with selected chart positions
Title	Year	Peak chart positions	Album
Title	Year	ALB	Album
"Sa gjynah" (Majk featuring Butrint Imeri)	2019	1	Non-album single
