= Djomb =

2020 song by Bosh

- J-Ax and Fabri Fibra remix cover

Single by Bosh

from the album Synkinisi
- Language: French
- Released: 28 March 2020
- Genre: Pop-rap
- Length: 2:21
- Label: Arista
- Songwriters: Mounir Maarouf; Blaise Batisse; Bosh

Bosh singles chronology
"Djomb" (2020)	"Slide" (2020)

Music video
- "Djomb" on YouTube

"Djomb" is a song performed by French singer Bosh, released in 2020. Commercially, it peaked at number one in France and Wallonia. On 9 August, Italian rapper J-Ax released a remix of the song with Fabri Fibra.

== Charts ==
=== Weekly charts ===
Weekly chart performance for "Djomb"
Chart (2020)	Peak position
Belgium (Ultratop 50 Flanders)	43
Belgium (Ultratop 50 Wallonia)	1
France (SNEP)	1
Italy (FIMI)	60
Switzerland (Schweizer Hitparade)	11

=== Year-end charts ===
2020 year-end chart performance for "Djomb"
Chart (2020)	Position
Belgium (Ultratop Wallonia)	47
France (SNEP)	7

== Certifications ==
Certifications for "Djomb"
Region	Certification	Certified units/sales
Belgium (BRMA)	Platinum	40,000^{‡}
France (SNEP)	Diamond	333,333^{‡}
Italy (FIMI)	Gold	35,000^{‡}
Switzerland (IFPI Switzerland)	Gold	10,000^{‡}
^{‡} Sales+streaming figures based on certification alone.
