= A36 (rapper) =

Swedish rapper (born 1995)

Geivar Hasado Shlaimon (born 11 May 1995), better known as A36, is a Swedish-Assyrian rapper.

== Biography ==
Shlaimon was born in Flen, Sweden. He grew up and lives in Partille.

He was named "Newcomer of the Year" by the magazine Kingsize in 2020. On 9 April 2021, A36 released the song "Samma gamla vanliga" which peaked at number one on the Swedish Sverigetopplistan.

In 2022, he was nominated for three Grammis, winning in the category of Newcomer of the Year. In August 2022, A36 performed his song on Allsång på Skansen broadcast on SVT.

== Discography ==
=== Studio albums ===
Title	Details	Peak chart positions			Certification
Title	Details	SWE	FIN	NOR	Certification
Area 36	Released: 12 November 2021; Label: Asylum Nordics; Formats: Digital download, streaming	4	46	13	IFPI SE: Platinum
Planet 36	Released: 12 April 2024; Label: Asylum Nordics; Formats: Digital download, streaming	7	—	—	

=== Singles ===
Title	Year	Peak chart positions				Certification	Album
Title	Year	SWE	DEN	FIN	NOR	Certification	Album
"Alien"	2020	—	—	—	—		Non-album singles
"Alé Alé"	2020	—	—	—	—		Non-album singles
"Ego"	2020	—	—	—	—		Non-album singles
"Tamaka"	2021	87	—	—	—		Non-album singles
"Samma gamla vanliga"	2021	1	12	4	3	IFPI DK: Gold; IFPI FI: Platinum; IFPI NO: Gold; IFPI SE: 4× Platinum	Area 36
"Motorola"	2021	20	—	—	—	IFPI SE: Platinum	Area 36
"Samma gamla vanliga" (remix; with Cledos, Averagekidluke, Ibe)	2021	—	—	1	—	IFPI FI: Platinum	Non-album single
"Going Lit" (with B.Baby)	2021	51	—	—	—		Non-album single
"Better Day" (with Jireel, Ricky Rich, Mona Masrour, Jelassi)	2021	66	—	—	—		Non-album single
"Djävulen eller jag" (with Shiro)	2022	64	—	—	—		Non-album single
"AT"	2022	34	—	—	—		Non-album single
"Tappat"	2022	9	—	—	—	IFPI SE: Platinum	Non-album single
"Blicky"	2023	40	—	—	—		Non-album single
"Genua"	2023	83	—	—	—		Non-album single
"Igen" (with Sticky)	2023	54	—	—	—		Non-album single
"Vad vill du ha?"	2023	90	—	—	—		Non-album single
"Standard" (with Einár)	2023	3	—	—	—	IFPI SE: Gold	Non-album single
"Dyra notor" (with Shiro and Noxious)	2023	36	—	—	—		Non-album single
"Död för mig" (with Yei Gonzalez and Myra Granberg)	2023	—	—	—	—		Non-album single
"Inga änglar (Na Na Na)"	2024	2	—	—	—		Planet 36
"Alla vill" (featuring Estraden)	2024	21	—	—	—		Planet 36
"Svalen till Grammis"	2024	45	—	—	—		Planet 36
"Veni vidi vici"	2024	71	—	—	—		Non-album singles
"Alla vill till himmelen" (with 25 and NBLNation)	2025	56	—	—	—		Non-album singles
"Mercedes" (with Shiro)	2026	36	—	—	—		Non-album singles

=== Featured singles ===
Title	Year	Peak chart positions		Certification	Album
Title	Year	SWE	FIN	Certification	Album
"Sanka" (Robin Kadir featuring A36, Jireel, Macky)	2021	41	—		Deja Vu
"Winner" (Jireel featuring A36)	2022	10	—	IFPI SE: Gold	MOTY
"City" (Cledos featuring A36)	2022	—	6		Euro Musik

=== Other charted songs ===
Title	Year	Peak chart positions	Certification	Album
Title	Year	SWE	Certification	Album
"Baws" (Asme featuring A36)	2021	67		Tusen flows
"Neighborhood Hero" (featuring Sarettii)	2021	79		Area 36
"Casa de papel" (featuring Asme)	2021	71		Area 36
"Baby" (featuring Asme and Ricky Rich)	2021	100		Area 36
"Block"	2021	16	IFPI SE: Platinum	Area 36
"Bilen" (featuring Asme)	2024	60		Planet 36
