= Zemër (song) =

2019 single by Dhurata Dora featuring Soolking

Single by Soolking and Dhurata Dora
- Language: Albanian and French
- Released: 19 April 2019
- Genre: Pop-rap; R&B
- Length: 3:40
- Label: Affranchis; Hyper Focal; Capitol
- Songwriters: Big Bang; Dhurata Dora; Soolking
- Producer: Big Bang

Dhurata Dora singles chronology
"Qikat E Mia" (2019)	"Zemër" (2019)	"Te Quiero" (2019)

Soolking singles chronology
"Liberté" (2019)	"Zemër" (2019)	"Espérance" (2019)

Music video
- "Zemër" on YouTube

"Zemër" (Albanian pronunciation: [zɛməɾ]; transl. Heart) is a song by Algerian rapper Soolking and Kosovo Albanian singer and songwriter Dhurata Dora. The song was entirely written by both artists themselves alongside Albanian producer Big Bang who was additionally hired for the production process of the song. The song was commercially successful throughout Europe peaking within the top thirty in Albania, Belgium, Switzerland and France. It was certified platinum by the Syndicat National de l'Édition Phonographique for selling over 200,000 units in France. For further promotion, the song was performed by both artists on various occasions among others in Zürich and Algiers.

== Background and composition ==
"Zemër" was written by Dhurata Dora and Soolking alongside Kosovo-Albanian producer Big Bang who also has handled the production process for the song. In terms of music notation, the song was composed in 4/4 time and is performed in the key of B minor in common time with a tempo of 157 beats per minute.

In the music video on YouTube and often Dhurata Dora is credited as the main artist and Soolking as featuring, however this information is incorrect as in the official song credits, Soolking is the main artist in collaboration with Dhurata.

== Music video and promotion ==
The accompanying music video for "Zemër" was premiered onto the YouTube channel of Redbox Entertainment on the 19 April 2019. The official music video was shot in the Amadeus Palace in the city of Tirana by Max Production, which has previously worked with singer on various singles. The song was in 2019 the most popular and most watched music video on YouTube in Switzerland. As of March 2026, the song has over 950 million views on YouTube.

== Personnel ==
Credits adapted from Tidal and YouTube.

- Soolking – songwriting, vocals
- Dhurata Dora – songwriting, vocals
- Big Bang – composing, producing, programming

== Charts ==
Chart (2019)	Peak position
Albania (The Top List)	-1
Belgium (Ultratip Bubbling Under Flanders)	–
Belgium (Ultratip Bubbling Under Wallonia)	6
France (SNEP)	21
Morocco (Hit Radio)	2
Switzerland (Schweizer Hitparade)	13

== Certifications ==
Region	Certification	Certified units/sales
France (SNEP)	Platinum	200,000^{‡}
^{‡} Sales+streaming figures based on certification alone.

== Release history ==
Region	Date	Format(s)	Label	Ref.
Various	19 April 2019	Digital download; streaming	Affranchis; Hyper Focal; Capitol	
