= Only You (Gims song) =

Single by Gims featuring Dhurata Dora

from the album Le Fléau
- Language: Albanian; French
- Released: 27 May 2021
- Length: 3:37
- Label: Géante Rouge; Indifference; Play Two; Sony

Gims featuring Dhurata Dora singles chronology
"GJS" (2021)	"Only You" (2021)	"Prends ma main" (2021)

Dhurata Dora singles chronology
"Harrom" (2020)	"Only You" (2021)	"Mi Amor" (2021)

Music video
- "Only You" on YouTube

"Only You" is a song by Congolese rapper Gims featuring Kosovar singer Dhurata Dora. It was released as the third single for the reissue of his fourth studio album, Les Vestiges du fléau (2021).

== Charts ==
Chart performance for "Only You"
Chart (2021)	Peak position
Albania (The Top List)	3
France (SNEP)	84
Switzerland (Schweizer Hitparade)	19

== Certifications ==
Certifications for "Only You"
Region	Certification	Certified units/sales
France (SNEP)	Gold	100,000^{‡}
Switzerland (IFPI Switzerland)	2× Platinum	40,000^{‡}
^{‡} Sales+streaming figures based on certification alone.

== Release history ==
Release dates and formats for "Only You"
Region	Date	Format(s)	Label(s)	Ref.
Various	27 May 2021	Digital download; streaming	Géante Rouge; Indifference; Play Two; Sony	
