= Eno (rapper) =

German rapper (born 1997)

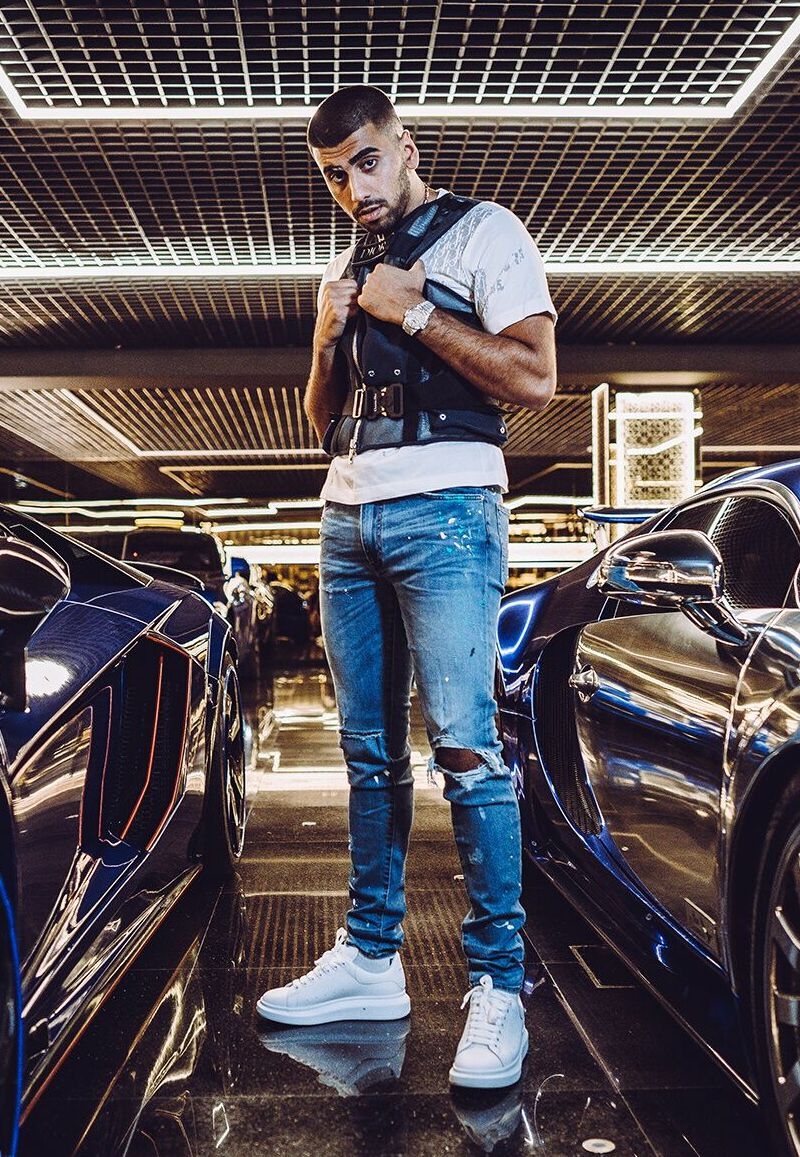
- Eno in 2019

Background information
- Also known as: Eno183
- Born: Ensar Albayrak; 18 June 1997 (age 29); Kovancılar, Elazığ, Turkey
- Genre: Hip hop
- Occupations: Rapper, lyricist
- Years active: 2016–present
- Labels: Alles oder Nix Records (2017-2021); UMG (2022-)

Ensar Albayrak (born 18 June 1997), known professionally as Eno, is a German rapper.

== Life and career ==
Ensar Albayrak was born on 18 June 1997 in Kovancılar, Elazığ, Turkey to parents of Kurdish descent. His family emigrated from Turkey to Germany when he was a child. Eno grew up in Wiesbaden. He began to study Civil engineering at RheinMain University in Wiesbaden before he became successful with music. Eno is signed to the label Alles oder Nix which belongs to the rapper Xatar. His first major success was the song "Wer macht Para?" in collaboration with German rapper Dardan.

He reached the top of the German single charts with the singles "Roli Glitzer Glitzer" (with Capital Bra & Luciano) and "Ferrari" (with Mero). Albayrak released from Alles oder nix Records after his 'BROT' album in 2021. As of 2023, he signed with Universal Music Group.

== Discography ==
=== Albums ===
Year	Title	Peak chart positions		
Year	Title	GER	AUT	SWI
2018	Wellritzstrasse	5	–	41
2019	Fuchs	3	6	10
2020	Bonität	16	35	50

=== Mixtapes ===
Year	Title	Peak chart positions	
Year	Title	GER	SWI
2017	Xalaz	39	66

=== Singles ===
==== As lead artist ====
Year	Title	Peak chart positions			Certifications	Album
Year	Title	GER	AUT	SWI	Certifications	Album
2018	"Wäwä"	45	–	–		
2018	"Penthouse"	30	66	–	BVMI: Gold	Wellritzstrasse
2018	"Mercedes"	6	18	41	BVMI: Gold	Wellritzstrasse
2018	"Cane cane" (featuring Rachid Moussa)	25	–	–		Wellritzstrasse
2018	"Malle" (featuring Xatar)	52	–	–		Wellritzstrasse
2018	"Wowowo"	72	–	–		Wellritzstrasse
2019	"Ferrari" (featuring Mero)	1	1	1	BVMI: Gold	Fuchs
2019	"Blackberry Sky"	2	6	11	BVMI: Gold	Fuchs
2019	"Plaza" (featuring Noah)	38	57	82		Fuchs
2019	"Wer macht Para 2" (with Dardan)	5	10	14		Sorry...
2019	"Entourage"	31	52	83		Bonität
2019	"Bunte Farben"	44	–	–		Bonität
2019	"Sauba"	65	–	–		Bonität
2019	"Mon ami" (featuring Ezhel)	73	–	–		Bonität
2020	"Kommunikation" (with Nimo)	6	9	27		Bonität
2020	"Bana ne"	78	–	–		Bonität
2020	"Ey hawar" (featuring Xatar)	53	–	–		Bonität
2020	"Was machst du" (with Murda)	32	67	–		Non-album single

==== As featured artist ====
Year	Title	Peak chart positions			Certifications	Album
Year	Title	GER	AUT	SWI	Certifications	Album
2017	"AMG2" (Azzi Memo featuring Eno)	8	39	51	BVMI: Gold	Trap'n'Haus
2018	"Roli Glitzer Glitzer" (Capital Bra featuring Luciano and Eno)	1	4	7		Allein
2019	"3%" (Moe Phoenix featuring Eno)	44	–	–		Emoetion
2020	"Aventador" (Dardan featuring Eno and Noah)	20	35	58		Soko Disko

=== Other charted songs ===
Year	Title	Peak chart positions		Album
Year	Title	GER	AUT	Album
2018	"Locodinho" (Luciano featuring Eno)	54	–	L.O.C.O.
2019	"Souvenir"	36	71	Fuchs
2019	"Hamdullah" (featuring Xatar)	89	–	Fuchs
2019	"Pilot" (featuring Luciano)	91	–	Fuchs
