= Habibi (Ricky Rich and ARAM Mafia song) =

Single by Ricky Rich and ARAM Mafia
- Language: Swedish
- Released: 2021
- Length: 2:59
- Songwriters: Ricky Rich; Marcus Turan; Peter Mrad (ARAM Mafia)
- Producer: ARAM Mafia

Ricky Rich and ARAM Mafia singles chronology
"Ice" (2021)	"Habibi" (2021)	"Ah Anne" (2021)

"Habibi" (meaning "my love" in Arabic) is a song by Swedish rappers Ricky Rich and ARAM Mafia. It peaked at number 29 of Sverigetopplistan, the official Swedish singles chart and spending 21 weeks in the chart. It became viral on TikTok in 2021 and also charted in Germany, Austria and Switzerland becoming Ricky Rich as well as ARAM Mafia's first ever international hit.

An official music video was released for the song directed by Viktor Blomdahl that featured Ricky Rich and actress and dancer Jeamy Blessed.

== Charts ==
Chart performance for "Habibi"
Chart (2018–2023)	Peak position
Austria (Ö3 Austria Top 40)	33
Germany (GfK Entertainment charts)	29
Greece (IFPI) Albanian remix	99
Greece (IFPI) Greek remix	1
Hungary (Single Top 40)	4
Sweden (Sverigetopplistan)	29
Switzerland (Schweizer Hitparade)	24

== Certifications ==
Certifications for "Habibi"
Region	Certification	Certified units/sales
Denmark (IFPI Danmark)	Gold	45,000^{‡}
France (SNEP)	Gold	100,000^{‡}
Germany (BVMI)	Gold	200,000^{‡}
Poland (ZPAV)	Platinum	50,000^{‡}
United Kingdom (BPI)	Silver	200,000^{‡}
Streaming
Greece (IFPI Greece) Greek remix	2× Platinum	4,000,000^{†}
Sweden (GLF)	Platinum	8,000,000^{†}
^{‡} Sales+streaming figures based on certification alone.^{†} Streaming-only figures based on certification alone.
