= Bosh (rapper) =

French rapper

N'Gongo Sombi, known as Bosh (born c. 1992) is a French rapper of Congolese origin from Plaisir, a western suburb of Paris. He specializes in street rap and deals with subjects of drugs, violence and youth problems.

== Career ==
He became well known through the web series Dans le kartier released on YouTube in 2009. He was in the rap formation BLK, a collective of 9 rappers and musicians including Bosh. He was also part of the rap group 78. He gained further clout in 2016 with the freestyle series Mal dominant. He released his mixtape Dos Argenté in June 2018 followed by the very successful album Synkinisi in March 2020. He has had a role as Karnage in Validé, directed by Franck Gastambide on Canal+ station.

== Discography ==
=== Albums and mixtapes ===
Title	Year	Peak positions		
Title	Year	FRA	BEL (Wa)	SWI
Dos argenté	2018	68	–	–
Synkinisi	2020	4	19	49

=== Singles ===
Title	Year	Peak positions			Album
Title	Year	FRA	BEL (Wa)	SWI	Album
"C'est pour nous"	2018	193	–	–	Dos argenté
"Business" (featuring SCH)	2020	73	–	–	Synkinisi
"Djomb"	2020	1	1	11	Synkinisi
"Trixma"	2020	43	8 (Ultratip*)	–	Non-album release
"Slide"	2020	12	25 (Ultratip*)	–	Non-album release

*Did not appear in the official Belgian Ultratop 50 charts, but rather in the bubbling under Ultratip charts.

=== Featured in ===
Title	Year	Peak positions	Album
Title	Year	FRA	Album
"Deux deux" (Kaaris feat. Bosh)	2020	9	Kaaris album 2.7.0

=== Other charting songs ===
Title	Year	Peak positions	Album
Title	Year	FRA	Album
"Four"	2018	129	Dos argenté
"Sans effets"	2018	191	Dos argenté
"Dans le noir"	2018	–	Dos argenté
"La monnaie"	2018	–	Dos argenté
"Bamboula"	2018	–	Dos argenté
"Défilé"	2020	62	Synkinisi
"Solitaire"	2020	52	Synkinisi
"Ravitaillé"	2020	186	Synkinisi
"Coeur noir"	2020	89	Synkinisi
"Anomalie"	2020	116	Synkinisi
"Ola Ola Ola" (with Heuss l'Enfoiré)	2021	10	No Limit (Compilation album)

== Filmography ==
- 2020: Validé as Karnage (TV series)
- 2024: "La cage" as Ibrahim Ibara (TV series)
