= Zuna (rapper) =

Lebanese-born German rapper (born 1993)

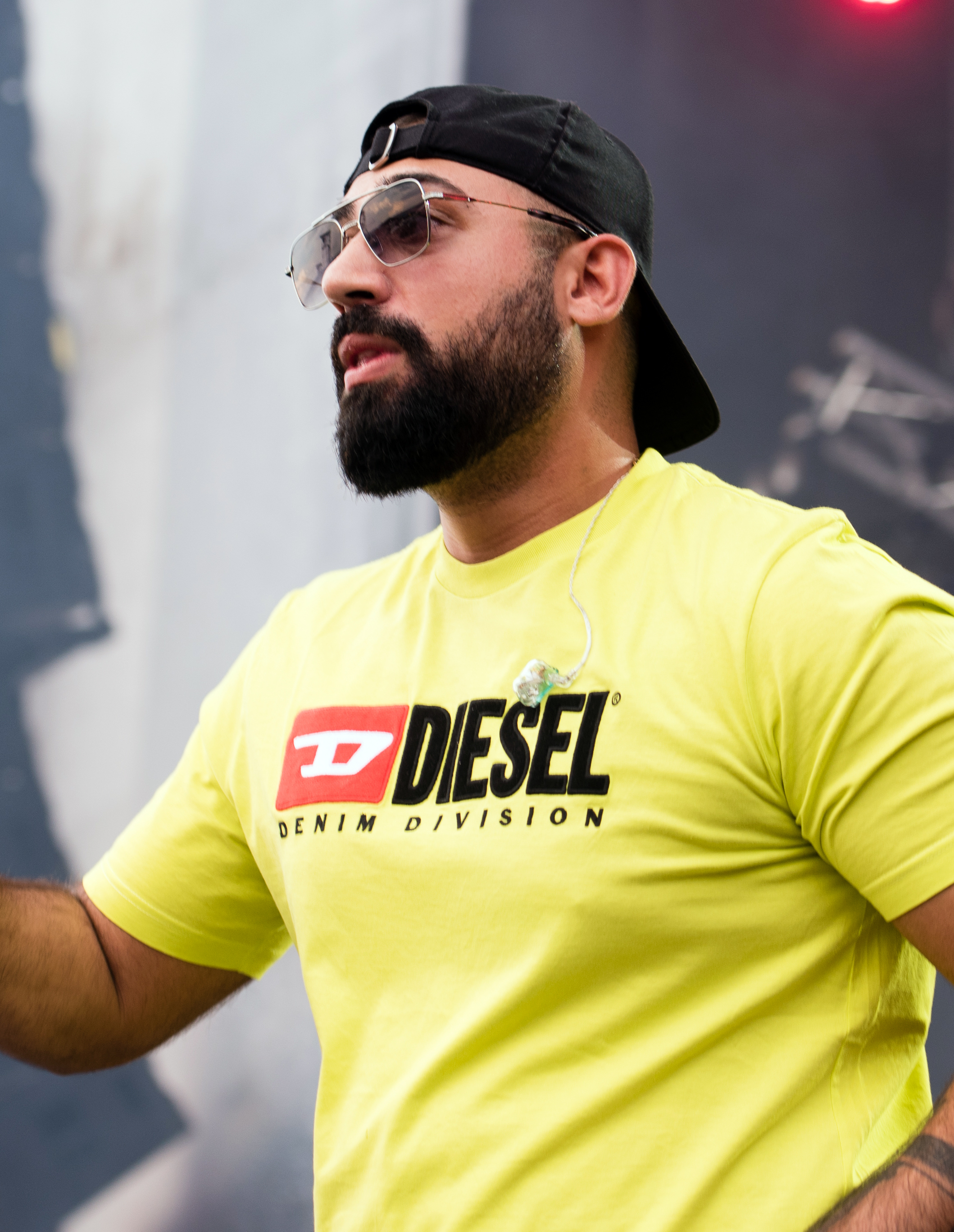
- Zuna in 2019

Background information
- Born: Ghassan Ramlawi; 3 July 1993 (age 32); Baalbek, Lebanon
- Origin: Dresden, Germany
- Genres: Hip-hop; trap
- Occupation: Rapper
- Years active: 2010–present
- Labels: KMN Gang

Ghassan Ramlawi (Arabic: غسان رملاوي; born 3 July 1993), known professionally as Zuna, is a Lebanese-born German rapper.

== Biography ==
Ghassan Ramlawi was born in Baalbek, Lebanon and has three siblings. In 2001, when he was seven years old, he immigrated to Germany with his single mother and siblings. They lived in Munich and later moved to Switzerland where they deported back to Lebanon, when Zuna was 15 years old. In the same year, his family moved again to Germany. Since then, they have lived in Dresden. Three years later, he and his family received asylum. Since 2010, he is part of the rap group KMN Gang.

== Discography ==
=== Albums ===
| Year | Title | Peak chart positions | | |
| Year | Title | GER | AUT | SWI |
|---|---|---|---|---|
| 2015 | Planet Zuna | – | – | – |
| 2017 | Mele7 | 2 | 4 | 1 |
| 2019 | Super Plus (with Azet) | 1 | 1 | 2 |
| 2021 | Mele7 2 | 16 | 9 | 9 |
| 2022 | Auf Loop | 33 | 63 | 32 |
| 2022 | Ultra Plus (with Azet) | 7 | 11 | 3 |
| 2024 | SOS | – | – | 70 |

=== Extended plays ===
| Year | Title | Peak chart positions | | |
| Year | Title | GER | AUT | SWI |
|---|---|---|---|---|
| 2016 | Richtung Paradies | – | – | – |

=== Singles ===
==== As lead artist ====
| Year | Title | Peak chart positions | | | Album |
| Year | Title | GER | AUT | SWI | Album |
|---|---|---|---|---|---|
| 2016 | "Hol mir dein Cousin" (featuring Nimo) | – | – | – | Richtung Paradies |
| 2016 | "KMN" | 88 | – | – | Mele7 |
| 2017 | "Wieso?" | 50 | 99 | 79 | Mele7 |
| 2017 | "Cazal" (featuring Miami Yacine) | 20 | 69 | 67 | Mele7 |
| 2017 | "Nummer 1" (featuring Azet & Noizy) | 7 | 42 | 25 | Mele7 |
| 2017 | "Mele 7" | 88 | – | – | Mele7 |
| 2018 | "Ayé" | 23 | 46 | 56 | Fast Life |
| 2018 | "KMN Member" (with Azet, Miami Yacine & Nash) | 11 | 10 | 9 | Non-album single |
| 2018 | "Skam koh" (with Azet) | 5 | 10 | 4 | Super Plus |
| 2018 | "Lelele" (with Azet) | 6 | 11 | 5 | Super Plus |
| 2019 | "Wenn die Sonne untergeht" (with Azet) | 7 | 8 | 9 | Super Plus |
| 2019 | "Hallo Hallo" (with Azet) | 3 | 7 | 7 | Super Plus |
| 2019 | "Fragen" (with Azet) | 4 | 9 | 10 | Super Plus |
| 2019 | "Biturbo" (with Bausa) | 26 | 43 | 83 | Need for Speed Heat O.S.T |
| 2020 | "Du bist mein" (with Loredana & SRNO) | 1 | 2 | 3 | Mele7 2 |
| 2020 | "Benzema" | 39 | 54 | 61 | Mele7 2 |
| 2020 | "1 Stunde" | 12 | – | 21 | Mele7 2 |
| 2020 | "NSHALLAH" (NSHALLAH (prod. by Jumpa)) | 56 | – | 67 | Mele7 2 |
| 2021 | "Du hast recht" | 26 | – | – | Mele7 2 |

==== As featured artist ====
| Year | Title | Peak chart positions | | | Album |
| Year | Title | GER | AUT | SWI | Album |
|---|---|---|---|---|---|
| 2016 | "Bereit zu sterben" (with Manuellsen) | – | – | – | Gangland |
| 2017 | "Großstadtdschungel" (with Miami Yacine) | 41 | 67 | 70 | Casia |
| 2018 | "Kriminell" (with Azet & Noizy) | 5 | 11 | 13 | Fast Life |

=== Other charted songs ===
| Year | Title | Peak chart positions | | | Album |
| Year | Title | GER | AUT | SWI | Album |
|---|---|---|---|---|---|
| 2017 | "Baby" | 51 | – | 61 | Mele7 |
| 2017 | "Original" (feat. Nash) | 52 | 71 | 43 | Mele7 |
| 2017 | "Czech Republic" (feat. Azet) | 78 | – | – | Mele7 |
| 2017 | "Dale" | 83 | – | – | Mele7 |
| 2017 | "Viertel" | 92 | – | – | Mele7 |
| 2018 | "Wer will mitfahren" (Azet feat. Zuna) | 98 | – | – | Fast Life |
| 2018 | "Safari" (Capital Bra feat. Zuna) | 57 | – | – | Allein |
| 2019 | "Kamehameha" (with Azet) | 5 | 9 | 10 | Super Plus |
| 2019 | "Pam pam" (with Azet) | 18 | 20 | 23 | Super Plus |
| 2019 | "Pare" (with Azet) | 31 | – | 14 | Super Plus |
| 2019 | "Nese Don" (with Azet feat. RAF Camora) | 45 | – | – | Super Plus |
| 2019 | "Ist es wahr" (with Azet) | 52 | – | – | Super Plus |
| 2019 | "Geld verdammt" (with Azet feat. Miami Yacine) | 65 | – | – | Super Plus |
| 2019 | "Zieh" (with Azet) | 69 | – | – | Super Plus |
| 2019 | "Ghetto" (with Azet) | 73 | – | – | Super Plus |
| 2021 | "Tag und Nacht" | 60 | – | – | Mele7 2 |
