= Nimo (rapper) =

German rapper (born 1995)

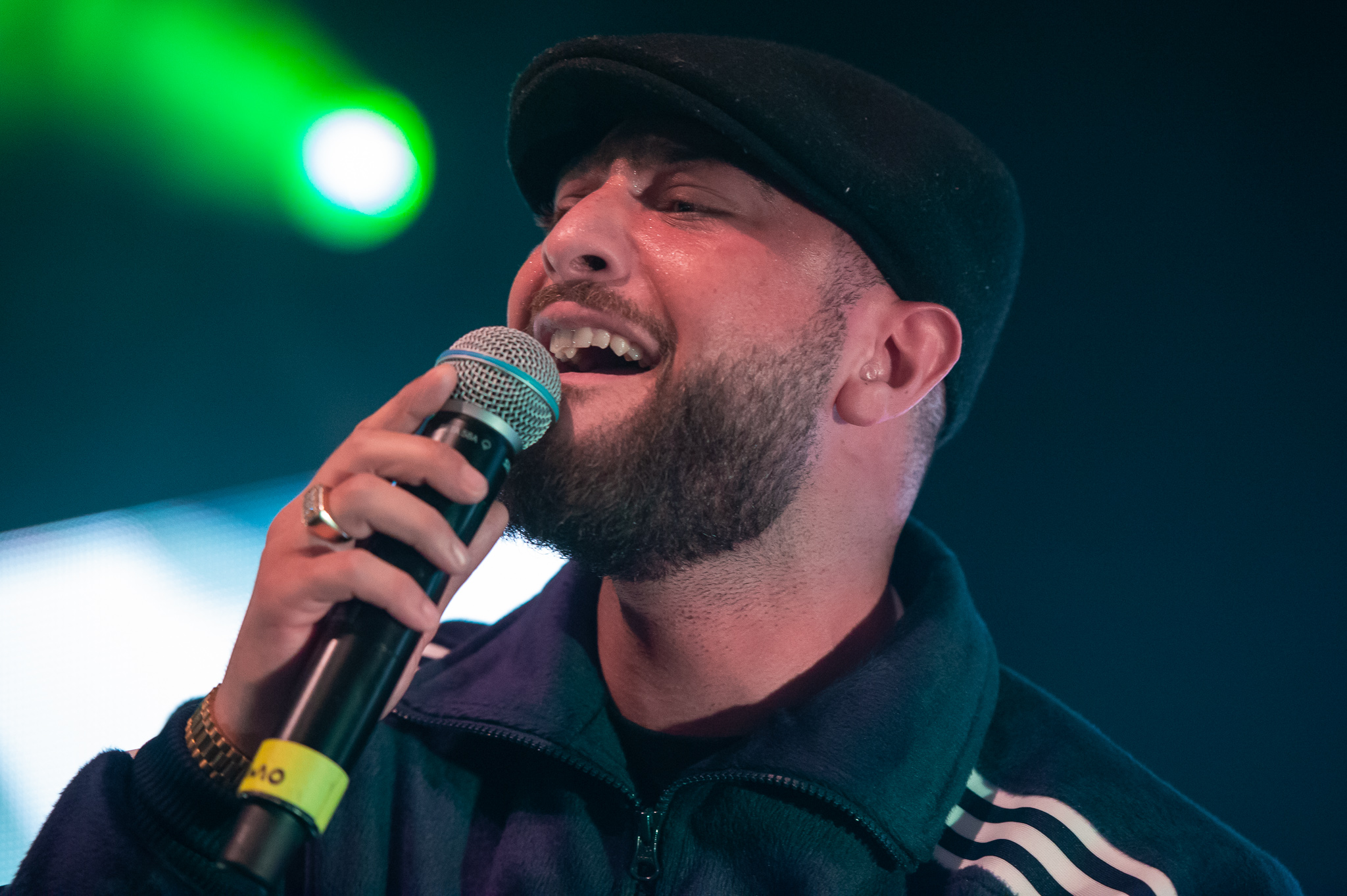
- Nimo performing in March 2018

Background information
- Born: Nima Yaghobi; 25 December 1995 (age 30); Karlsruhe, Germany
- Genres: Hip hop; rap; German rap; trap
- Occupation: Rapper
- Years active: 2015–present
- Labels: 385idéal; Moonboys Entertainment

Nima Yaghobi (Persian: نیما یعقوبی, romanized: Nīmā Yaʿqūbī; born 25 December 1995), known professionally as Nimo, is a German rapper. Formerly signed to 385idéal, he founded his own label, Moonboys Entertainment, in January 2021.

== Early life ==
Born in Karlsruhe to Iranian parents, Yaghobi's family later moved to Leonberg. At the age of 15, he was sent to juvenile detention because of multiple offences. He is autistic.

== Discography ==
=== Studio albums ===
Title	Album details	Peak chart positions		
Title	Album details	GER	AUT	SWI
K¡K¡	Released: June 17, 2017; Label: 385idéal, Urban; Formats: CD, digital download, vinyl	4	3	6
Nimoriginal	Released: December 20, 2019; Label: 385idéal, Urban; Formats: CD, digital download	4	38	8

=== Collaborative albums ===
Title	Album details	Peak chart positions		
Title	Album details	GER	AUT	SWI
Capimo (with Capo)	Released: March 22, 2019; Label: 385idéal, Universal Music Group; Formats: CD, digital download	7	5	16

=== Mixtapes ===
Title	Album details	Peak chart positions		
Title	Album details	GER	AUT	SWI
Habeebeee	Released: February 26, 2016; Label: 385idéal; Formats: CD, digital download	10	12	5
Steinbock	Released: August 28, 2020; Label: 385idéal; Formats: CD, digital download	39	28	35

=== Singles ===
==== As lead artist ====
Year	Title	Peak chart positions			Album
Year	Title	GER	AUT	SWI	Album
2015	"Bitter"	–	–	–	Richtung Paradies
2016	"Idéal"	–	–	–	Habeebeee
2016	"Flouz kommt Flouz geht"	–	–	–	Habeebeee
2016	"Nie wieder" (feat. Abdi)	–	–	–	Habeebeee
2016	"Lolo"	–	–	–	Non-album singles
2016	"Koala" (feat. Marvin Game & Hanybal)	–	–	–	Non-album singles
2017	"LFR"	33	69	78	K¡K¡
2017	"Michelangelo"	87	–	–	K¡K¡
2017	"Heute mit mir"	10	41	66	K¡K¡
2017	"Hype" (feat. Celo & Abdi)	–	–	–	K¡K¡
2017	"Mon Chéri" (with Capo)	9	28	38	Capimo
2018	"Akzeptier'n uns nicht"	69	–	–	Non-album single
2018	"Lean" (with Capo)	12	27	43	Capimo
2018	"Zoey" (with Capo)	8	43	36	Capimo
2018	"Anderes Niveau" (with Capo)	58	–	–	Capimo
2019	"Shem Shem & Sex" (with Capo)	12	32	44	Capimo
2019	"Roadrunner" (with Capo)	23	53	92	Capimo
2019	"Leyla" (with Capo)	13	29	53	Capimo
2019	"Planlos" (with Capo)	64	–	–	Capimo
2019	"Blue Lagoon" (with Gringo)	42	–	–	Non-album singles
2019	"Dream Girl" (with Butrint Imeri)	41	72	48	Non-album singles
2019	"J-Lo" (with AriBeatz & Lacrim)	44	–	–	Press Play
2019	"Karma"	4	4	2	Nimoriginal
2019	"Kein Schlaf" (with Hava)	1	2	3	Nimoriginal
2020	"Kommunikation" (with Eno)	6	9	27	Non-album single
2020	"Nur wegen dir"	15	35	39	Steinbock
2020	"Remember"	24	55	60	Steinbock
2020	"Ya maschara" (with NGEE)	93	–	–	Non-album single
2020	"Trendsetter" (with Rina)	18	26	41	Steinbock
2020	"Alles zu viel" (feat. Ramo)	32	43	67	Steinbock
2020	"To the Moon"	46	–	–	Steinbock

==== As featured artist ====
Year	Title	Peak chart positions			Album
Year	Title	GER	AUT	SWI	Album
2017	"Lambo Diablo GT" (with Capo)	21	39	–	Alles auf Rot
2017	"Rhythm N' Flouz" (with Celo & Abdi & Olexesh)	51	–	–	Diaspora
2017	"Telefon" (with Dardan)	25	41	43	Dardy Luther King
2017	"Vanilla Sky" (with Hanybal)	70	–	–	Haramstufe Rot
2018	"Piccos" (with Dardan)	32	37	81	Dardy Luther King (Pt. II)
2018	"BlaBla" (with Azzi Memo)	14	30	43	Surf'n'Turf
2018	"Valentino Camouflage" (with Luciano)	6	13	18	L.O.C.O.
2019	"Bis um 3" (with Kalim)	26	71	93	Null auf Hundert
2019	"Wer" (with Jigzaw)	38	66	–	Jiggi
2019	"Royal Rumble" (with Kalazh44, Capital Bra, Samra & Luciano)	1	3	4	Non-album single
2019	"Augen Husky" (with Olexesh)	14	29	34	Augen Husky
2019	"Lowrider" (with Kalim)	15	40	47	Non-album single
2020	"Desolé" (with Mero)	3	10	13	Seele

=== Other charted songs ===
Year	Title	Peak chart positions			Album
Year	Title	GER	AUT	SWI	Album
2017	"Wie Falco" (feat. Ufo361 & Yung Hurn)	64	63	–	K¡K¡
2017	"Veni Vidi Siktim"	86	–	–	K¡K¡
2017	"Hoodi" (feat. Soufian)	92	–	–	K¡K¡
2017	"Let's Go Amina" (feat. Hanybal)	100	–	–	K¡K¡
2018	"Geld spielt keine Rolex" (Olexesh feat. Nimo)	53	–	–	Rolexesh
2019	"Bye Bye" (Capital Bra feat. Nimo)	7	6	12	CB6
2019	"Dunkel" (with Capo)	23	43	49	Capimo
2019	"Star" (with Luciano)	36	–	79	Nimoriginal
2020	"Not Safe" (with Reezy)	65	–	–	Steinbock

== Awards and nominations ==
=== Results ===
Year	Awards	Nomination	Work	Result	Ref.
2016	Hiphop.de Awards	Best Newcomer National	Himself	Won	
2017	Hiphop.de Awards	Best Rap-Solo-Act National	Himself	Won	
2017	Hiphop.de Awards	Best Song National	Lambo Diablo GT (with Capo)	Won	
2017	Hiphop.de Awards	Best Album National	K¡K¡	Nominated	
2019	Hiphop.de Awards	Best Video National	Royal Rumble (with Luciano, Kalazh44, Capital Bra, Samra)	Nominated	
2019	Hype Awards	Best Collab	Himself (with Capo)	Nominated	
2020	Hiphop.de Awards	Best Album National	Steinbock	Nominated	
2020	Hiphop.de Awards	Lyricist of the Year	Himself	Nominated	
