= Azet (rapper) =

Albanian-born German rapper (born 1993)

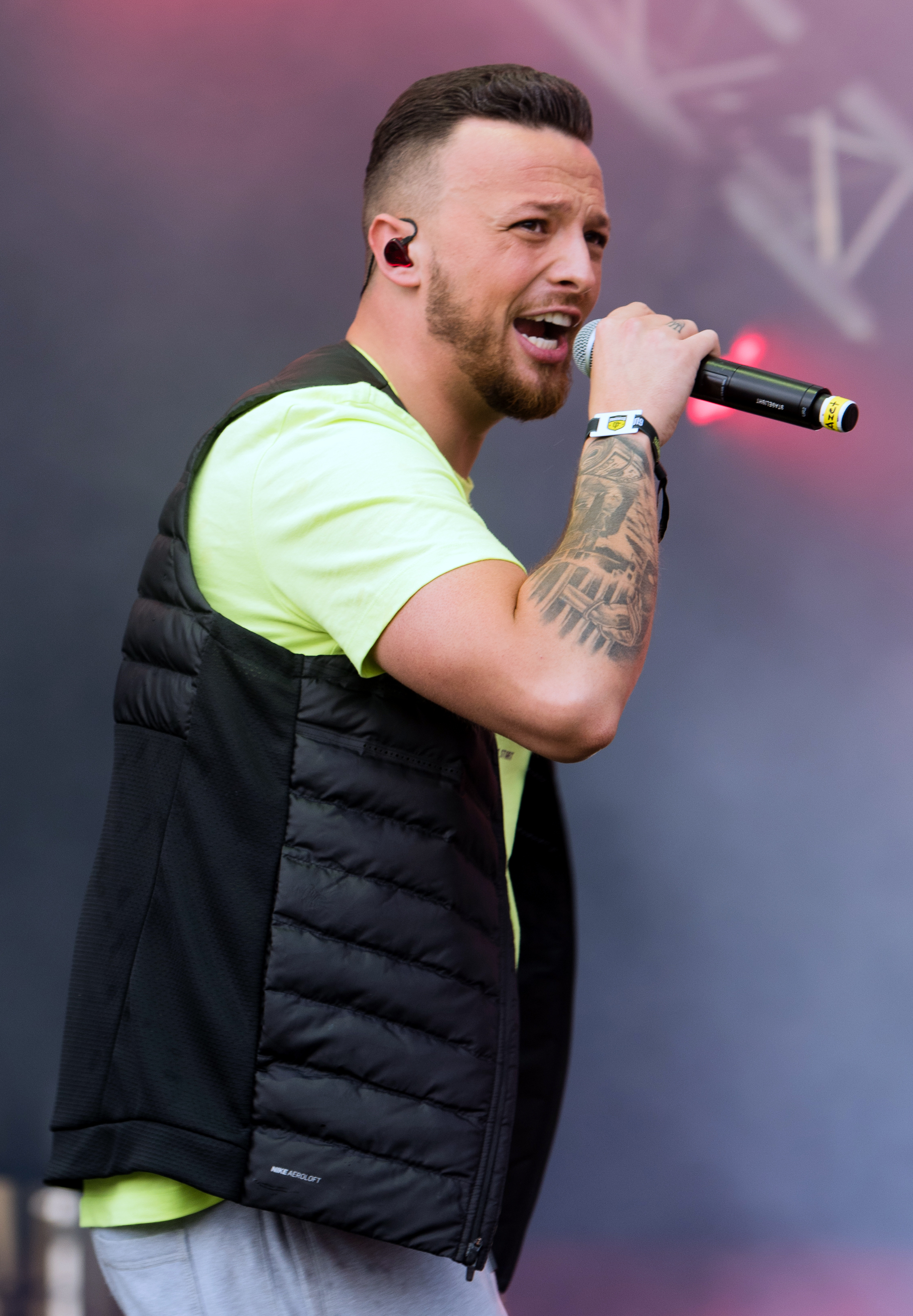
- Azet in 2019

Background information
- Born: Granit Musa; 6 March 1993 (age 33); Tirana, Albania
- Origin: Dresden, Germany
- Genres: Hip hop; gangsta rap
- Occupations: Rapper; songwriter
- Years active: 2008–present
- Label: KMN Gang

Granit Musa (pronounced [gɾaˈnit muˈsa]; born 6 March 1993), professionally known as Azet, is an Albanian-born German rapper.

Azet released his debut studio album Fast Life in 2018, which peaked at number one in Germany, Austria and Switzerland. He continued to achieve similar success with the subsequent collaborative album Super Plus in 2019, which additionally peaked the album charts in the German-speaking Europe.

== Biography ==
=== 1993–2017 ===
Granit Musa was born in Tirana, Albania. His Kosovo Albanian family, which hailed from the Orllan section of Podujeva, Kosovo, left that country for political reasons due to the persecution of Albanians that was prompted by the disintegration of Yugoslavia. After relocating to Dresden, Germany, he grew up in the district of Prohlis and met his future friend and longtime collaborator Nash.

In 2016, Azet announced his debut extended play, Fast Life, which peaked at number 51 in Switzerland. In 2017, he almost released three singles, including "Gjynah", which peaked at number eight in Germany and Switzerland. His follow-up single, "Qa Bone" in collaboration with Austrian rapper RAF Camora, became his first single to be certified gold by the Bundesverband Musikindustrie, IFPI Austria and IFPI Switzerland. The same year, Azet was featured on "Nummer 1" in collaboration with rappers Zuna and Noizy, which achieved to be certified platinum in Germany and gold in Austria and Switzerland.

=== 2018–present ===
In 2018, Azet released his debut studio album, Fast Life, and experienced commercial success in German-speaking Europe debuting at number one on the Austrian, German and Swiss album charts. Afterwards, he collaborated with fellow Zuna on his follow-up top-ten singles "Skam koh", "Lelele" and "Hallo Hallo". In December 2018, Azet announced his first collaborative album, Super Plus, with the aforementioned rapper to be released in March 2019. After the release, it debuted at number one on the charts of Austria and Germany and peaked at number two in Switzerland.

== Discography ==
- Fast Life (2018)
- Super Plus (2019)
- Mango EP (2019)
- Fast Life 2 (2020)
- Neue Welt (2021)
- Ultra Plus (2022)
- Tirana EP 1 (2023)
