= Dardan (rapper) =

German rapper (born 1997)

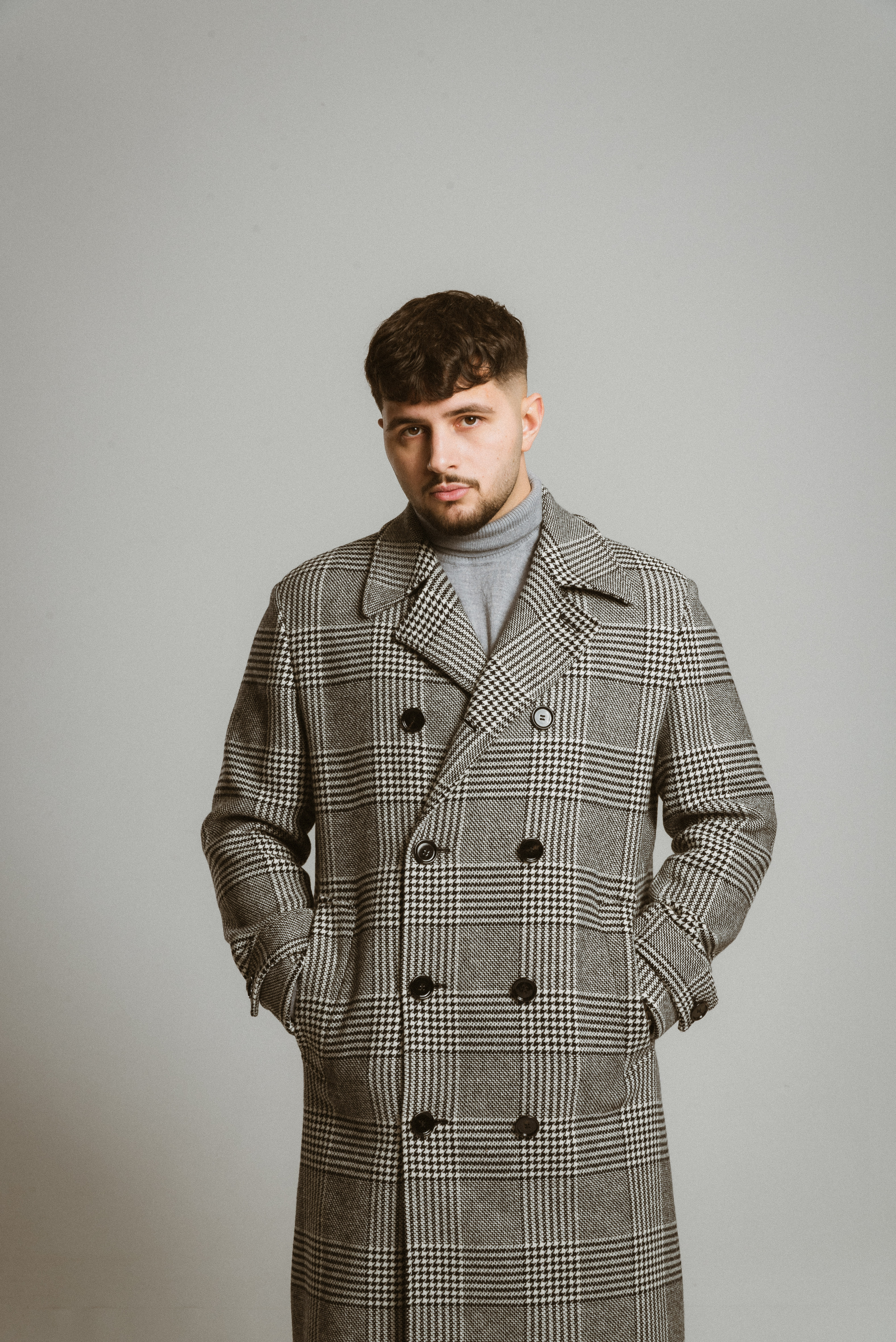
- Dardan in 2021

Background information
- Also known as: Mister Dardy
- Born: Dardan Mushkolaj; 2 October 1997 (age 28); Stuttgart, Germany
- Genres: Hip hop
- Occupations: Rapper; singer; songwriter
- Years active: 2016–present
- Labels: Hypnotize Entertainment; Universal

Dardan Mushkolaj (Albanian: [daɾdan muʃkolaj]; born 2 October 1997), also known under the pseudonym Mister Dardy, is a German rapper.

He was born into an Albanian family from Deçan, Kosovo, in the district Zuffenhausen of Stuttgart, Germany. He rose to significant prominence in German-speaking Europe following the release of his first single "Telefon" in 2017.

== Discography ==
- Hallo Deutschrap (2017)
- Sorry (2019)
- Soko Disko (2020)
- Mister Dardy (2021)
- DardyNextDoor (2022)
- Dardania (2023)
- Mr. Untouchable (2024)
- Catch Me If You Can (2025)
