= African Americans in France =

Americans of Black ancestry living in France as a resident or naturalized citizen

African Americans (also referred to as Black Americans (Note: Consider referencing: African Americans#Terminology for more information on referential trends and preferences.)) in France are people of Black African ancestry, who were born in-, or consider themselves as having originated from the United States, and who later become residents and/or citizens of France. This includes students and temporary workers. This population is significant for its size, provenance, and bilateral cultural impact.

France has historically been described as a "haven" for black people, having officially declared itself a "color-blind" society following the abolition of slavery in Saint-Domingue (Haiti) in 1794. Black people have migrated to France since the 19th century, often to escape the prevalent racism in the United States. The emergence of WWI and the subsequent rise of jazz in France laid the foundations for a bustling African American community, and opened doors for black performers, writers, mucisians and other artists. France does not collect information about race or ethnicity in their census, making it impossible to gauge how many Black Americans are currently in France, let alone those of any black ancestries. Recent years have brought calls for a racial awakening in France, and a resurgence of black pride under the ideology of "négritude."

== Migration ==
=== Colonial era ===
African Americans, who are largely descended from Africans of the American colonial era, have lived and worked in France since the 1800s. This first mass migration of African Americans to France occurred as a result of the Louisiana Purchase of 1803, following the Haitian Revolution against French colonial rule. When the French territory was transferred to America, many free black Americans moved to France to escape the apartheid state. Unofficial estimates put this figure at nearly 50,000 free black individuals.

=== World War I and the interwar period ===
During World War I roughly 200,000 African-American soldiers were brought over, most for non-combat duties. Nine-tenths of the soldiers were from the American South. The 369th Infantry Regiment of New York, better known as the Harlem Hellfighters, were the first to arrive in France in 1917. One member, Sergeant Henry Johnson, was the first American Soldier to be awarded the Croix de guerre with palm by the French Army. Many black GIs decided to stay in France after having been well received by the French, and others followed them. France was viewed by many African Americans as a welcome change from the widespread racism in the United States.

It was then that jazz was introduced to the French, and black culture was born in Paris. African-American musicians, artists and writer (many associated with the Harlem Renaissance) found 1920s Paris ready to embrace them with open arms. France represented a golden opportunity for many jazz musicians to escape not only racism, but also growing competition from oversaturation in the American jazz scene. Entertainers such as Josephine Baker and Eugene Bullard are among those who experienced great success after moving to France in the 20's. Montmartre became the center of the small community, with jazz clubs such as Le Grand Duc, Chez Florence, and Bricktop's thriving in Paris. Often referred to as "Les Années Folles" (or the Crazy Years), 1920's France hosted a small but significant number of African Americans, and represented an era of black American cultural appreciation.

=== World War II ===
The Nazi German invasion of Paris in June 1940 led to the suppression of the "corrupt" influence of jazz in the French capital and the danger of imprisonment for African Americans choosing to remain in the city. Most Americans, black as well as white, left Paris at the time. Following World War II, the arrival of black immigrants from former French colonies had offered Black people in France the chance to experience new forms of black culture. The period after WWII brought hundreds of black Americans to Paris, including prominent American writers such as Richard Wright and James Baldwin, and a new generation of jazz musicians.

In the 1950s and 1960s, the political upheavals surrounding the Civil Rights Movement and the Vietnam War protests in the United States were mirrored by civil unrest in France. The African-American journalist William Gardner Smith was a novelist (Last of the Conquerors) who worked for Agence France-Presse. The French news service reported the events of the student uprising during the May 1968 protests. Many black residents supported the movement, which escalated into a virtual shutdown of the entire country. Once order was restored, however, a notable increase in repressive tendencies was observed in the French police and the immigration authorities.

=== Contemporary era ===
While it is illegal to collect data concerning race or ethnicity in France, immigration wave research suggest there are between 3-5 million black people currently in the country. France remains a hub for African-American intellectuals and creatives. Rapper Kanye West is one such example, establishing roots in the French fashion and music scene. His song "Niggas in Paris" featuring Jay-Z, was inspired by his time in France and later used in a campaign commercial by the former French president, François Hollande.

== Culture ==
In the 1920s many Parisians became fascinated with Africa and black individuals, due to a growing social interest in primitivism and sensuality. For this reason, most Black Americans at the time were performers, often finding it difficult to obtain other forms of employment given their foreigner status. Langston Hughes wrote about his own struggles with finding employment during his time in France in his autobiography, The Big Sea. The Algerian War also had a significant impact on French African-American culture, largely because it changed people's perspectives on the "colorblindness" of France. Influential writers such as William Gardner Smith (The Stone Face) and James Baldwin ("Alas, Poor Richard") brought attention to the ways France mistreated its colonial subjects, and how this mistreatment was similar to the bigotry black Americans had faced in the States. These works bolstered calls for discourse about race and diaspora as France moved into the 21st century.

== Interpretation ==
Tyler Stovall, a history professor at the University of California, Berkeley, has said:

In many ways, African Americans came to France as a sort of privileged minority, a kind of model minority, if you will—a group that benefited not only from French fascination with blackness, but a French fascination about Americanness. Although their numbers never exceeded a few thousand.

The Conseil Représentatif des Associations Noires (CRAN) has stated:

Figures on nationalities are allowed but a black immigrant becoming French will disappear from statistics... Based on data from immigration waves researchers have come to say there may be 3 to 5 million black people in France.

African Americans in France make up a minority of the French population, and are not represented in statistical data. French universalism and a historical fascination with black American culture have made them into what Tyler Stovall calls a "model minority."

== Notable figures ==
- J. Alexander, model
- Evelyn Anderson, dancer
- Josephine Baker, entertainer and actress
- Longineu W. Parsons III
- Mickey Baker, influential guitarist in rock and roll, and rhythm and blues
- James Baldwin, author and essayist
- Sidney Bechet, jazz musician
- Dee Dee Bridgewater, jazz singer and actress
- Arthur Briggs, jazz musician
- Eugene Bullard, world's first Black military pilot
- Barbara Chase-Riboud, novelist, poet, sculptor and visual artist
- Kenny Clarke, jazz musician
- Bessie Coleman, first African-American pilot
- Beauford Delaney, modernist painter
- Carole Fredericks, singer
- Johnny Griffin, jazz musician
- Chester Himes, crime novelist
- Quincy Jones, musician, composer, record producer
- Eartha Kitt, singer, actress, and entertainer
- Lenny Kravitz, rock musician
- Ealy Mays, painter
- Memphis Slim, blues pianist and singer
- Chloé Mortaud, Miss France, 2009
- Shaun Ollison, model, Ms. California 2000
- Rashaan Nall, actor, director, screenwriter, painter
- Lobo Nocho, jazz singer and painter who was romantically involved with Winston Churchill's daughter Sarah
- Charlie Parker, jazz musician
- Tony Parker, basketball player for the NBA's San Antonio Spurs and Charlotte Hornets (born in Belgium, but raised in France)
- Melvin Sanders, professional basketball player
- Victor Séjour, playwright
- Nina Simone, jazz and blues singer, a prominent leader during the American Civil Rights Movement
- Ada "Bricktop" Smith, dancer, singer, vaudevillian, and self-described saloon-keeper
- William Gardner Smith, journalist, novelist, and editor
- Barbara Summers
- Henry Ossawa Tanner, painter
- Melvin Van Peebles, filmmaker
- Dominique Wilkins, NBA Hall of Famer (born in France while his father was stationed there with the U.S. Air Force)
- Richard Wright, author of novels, short stories, and non-fiction
- Amir Richardson

== See also ==
- Afro-French
- Americans in France
- Senegalese people in France
- Cameroonians in France
- Congolese people in France
- Beninese people in France
- Human trafficking in France
- Ghanaians in France
- Ivorians in France
- Malians in France
- Togolese people in France
- Niggas in Paris
