= Congolese people in France =

Les Congolais en France (French)

Total population
- 132,100 (2018)

Regions with significant populations
- Île-de-France (especially Paris, Seine-et-Marne, Yvelines, Essonne, Hauts-de-Seine, Seine-Saint-Denis, Val-de-Marne and Val-d'Oise); Grand Est; Normandy; Centre-Val de Loire; Bourgogne-Franche-Comté; Hauts-de-France; Pays de la Loire; Brittany; Nouvelle-Aquitaine; Occitania; Auvergne-Rhône-Alpes; Provence-Alpes-Côte d'Azur

Languages
- Predominantly; French and Lingala Others Kikongo, Kiswahili, and Tshiluba

Religion
- Predominantly; Roman Catholicism and Protestantism Others Animism, Islam (Sunni, Shia), and atheism

Related ethnic groups
- Black people in France, Afro-French, Cameroonians in France, Gabonese people in France, Angolans in France

Congolese people in France include immigrants from the Democratic Republic of the Congo and the Republic of the Congo, as well as their descendants. They form one of the largest French-speaking African diasporas in the country and have grown steadily since the 1960s through labor migration, family reunification, higher education, political exile, and asylum. Congolese people predominantly live in the Paris metropolitan area.

Migration from the Republic of the Congo increased after the country became independent in 1960 and was supported by the country's close political, educational, and linguistic ties with France. Migration from the Democratic Republic of the Congo grew during the economic crisis of the 1980s and increased further because of political unrest, armed conflict, and humanitarian emergencies. According to the French National Institute of Statistics and Economic Studies (Institut national de la statistique et des études économiques; INSEE), there were 132,100 descendants of immigrants from both Congos living in France in 2018, including 68,600 descendants of immigrants from the Republic of the Congo and 63,500 descendants of immigrants from the Democratic Republic of the Congo.

== History ==
=== Democratic Republic of the Congo ===
==== Background of migration ====
Before gaining independence on 30 June 1960, the Democratic Republic of the Congo passed through four main historical periods. The first lasted from "time immemorial to 1885". In that year, the Congo Free State was established as the private personal property of King Leopold II of Belgium. This relatively brief period lasted until 1908, when Belgium took control of the territory and turned it into a colony. The Belgian colonial period continued until 1960, when the country became independent. After independence, the country has been characterized by political unrest and violence. Civil wars have been a common part of its history. During the First Republic (1960–1965), the country faced major instability. Katanga and South Kasai declared secession, while several rebel groups fought across the country, including a rival "popular government" that controlled the Orientale province. These conflicts forced many people to flee their homes and created the country's first large waves of internally displaced people and refugees in the post-colonial period.

In 1965, the First Republic came to an end after a military coup brought a new regime to power. Political conditions became more stable, although unrest continued in the eastern part of the country. Mercenaries attempted to invade the city of Bukavu, but a military operation conducted by Armée Nationale Congolaise (ANC – the Congolese National Army) halted the advance of the rebellion. Meanwhile, large numbers of people fled their villages, moving either to other parts of the country or to neighboring states such as Rwanda, Burundi, Uganda, Tanzania, and Zambia. When relative calm was eventually restored across the country, additional population movements took place in the form of rural-to-urban migration and urban-to-rural migration. However, rural exodus remained far more significant than urban-to-rural migration because, during the Second Republic (1965–1997), the exploitation of the country's abundant natural resources was reserved exclusively for the state. The liberalization of the natural resource sector was not authorized until 1983. Although the government remained firmly in power, resting on an "obscure despotism", it gradually encountered growing difficulties arising from widespread dissatisfaction with its poor economic performance. By the 1980s, Zaire was forced to accept strict economic reforms required by international financial institutions.

These institutions implemented structural adjustment programs in the country. As part of these reforms, civil servants' salaries were reduced, even though the public sector employed only about 4.1% of the country's economically active population. Student scholarships were abolished, and public hospitals lost government subsidies. Political propaganda even adopted a refrain that was repeatedly broadcast on Office Zaïrois de Radio Télévision (OZRT) proclaiming "the death of the welfare state", which reflected the growing withdrawal of government support for basic public services. While the political elite continued to benefit from the country's resources, the rest of the population faced worsening living conditions. The country's economic problems became permanent, and most economic indicators continued to fall. During the 1990s, the government's handling of calls for political reform only made the crisis worse. Since then, economic progress has remained limited, with little reason for optimism.

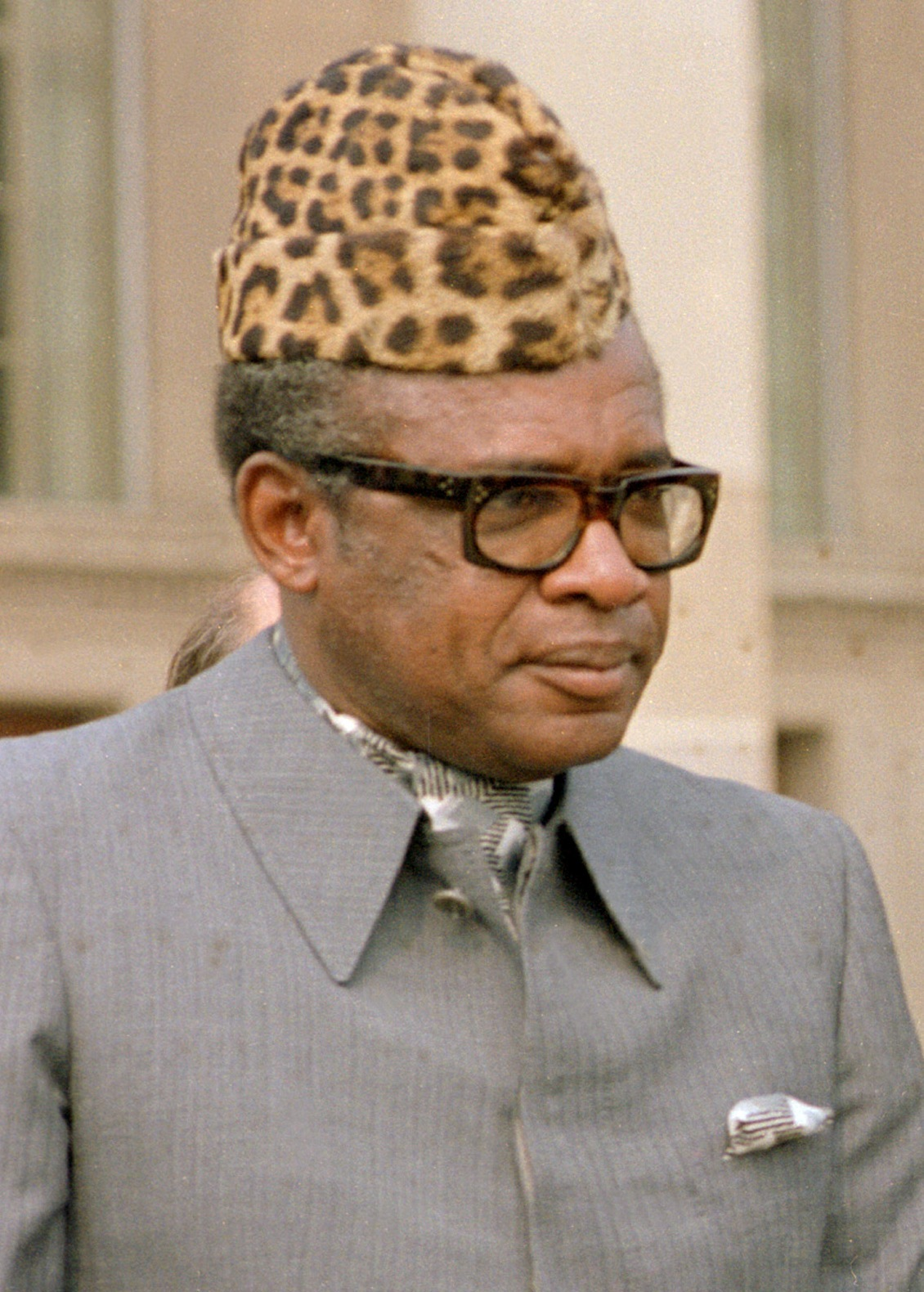
During Mobutu's rule, many Zaireans migrated to France due to economic hardship.

Meanwhile, migration from rural areas to cities continued to increase. Kinshasa attracted more migrants than any other city in the country. According to sociologist and historian, Léon de Saint Moulin, the capital received the largest number of people moving from other parts of the Democratic Republic of the Congo every year. However, cities did not have enough housing, roads, schools, or public services to support the growing population. As a result, many cities effectively became sprawling shantytowns. During this period, more Congolese also moved to neighboring African countries, Western Europe, and the United States. International migration became an important goal for many families, who developed different ways to make it possible. As migration became more common, many people in cities and rural areas began to see it as a way to build a better future. In a country where the state could no longer provide enough security or support, migration became an important strategy for improving economic stability. When the war that ended the rule of Mobutu Sese Seko began in 1996, it struck a country that was already in poor condition. Much of the infrastructure had fallen into disrepair, and the government had done little to improve the lives of the population. Moreover, neo-patrimonial political practices in the exercise of power have not been entirely eradicated from the management of public affairs even today. Martin Ekwa bis Isal argues that the country's long political transition did not completely remove the habits inherited from colonial rule and the Second Republic. He also suggests that it created new problems, stating that the "hypertrophy of the political class and the excessive number of candidates for elective office indicate that politics is still perceived and understood as a means of gaining prestige and rapid wealth without effort". The Netherlands Institute for Southern Africa (NiZA) described the Congolese government in a report titled l'Etat contre le peuple ("The State Against the People"). The report argued that much of the failure of the country's political transition was caused by poor governance and widespread corruption. It explained that the Democratic Republic of the Congo was still affected by a system of government in which public office was mainly used for personal gain rather than public service. According to the report, this was one of the biggest barriers to rebuilding the country and dealing with its humanitarian crisis.

In 1997, the Second Republic ended when Laurent-Désiré Kabila overthrew Mobutu. After taking power, Kabila restored the country's official name to the Democratic Republic of the Congo, abandoning the name Zaire, which had become associated with Mobutu's rule. However, only a year later, his government came under attack, leading to a war that involved Congolese groups and several foreign countries. Some states supported the government in Kinshasa, while others backed rebel movements in an effort to weaken it. Because so many African countries became involved, the conflict became known as "Africa's World War". The war lasted five years and was followed by many diplomatic meetings involving the Congolese government, political groups, and other African countries. These negotiations led to the 1999 Lusaka Agreement, which called for a new political system. A power-sharing government was later formed under the "1+4" formula, with one president and four vice presidents, before national elections were held in 2006. The war caused large-scale population displacement across the country. Millions of people fled their homes and moved to safer areas within the Democratic Republic of the Congo, while many others sought refuge in neighboring countries. These movements had a major impact on the country's stability and its humanitarian situation. Armed conflict was not the only reason people were forced to leave their homes. Eastern Congo is also affected by volcanic eruptions and earthquakes. During the 1997 eruption of Mount Nyiragongo near Goma, many residents fled to Rwanda and other parts of the country. Most of these people later returned to Goma, and only a small number remained outside the country.

==== Informal economic activities ====
The migration of Congolese people from the Democratic Republic of the Congo to France increased as Zaire's economy declined during the mid-1970s. Falling prices for export products, the failure of the Zairianization policy, rising public debt, widespread corruption, and weaker state institutions severely weakened the country's economy. By the early 1990s, high inflation, shortages of basic goods, failing public services, and political instability had become common. The collapse of democratic reforms after the democratization in 1990 made the situation even worse. With fewer job opportunities and little government support, many people chose to leave the country in search of better opportunities. France, together with Belgium, became one of the main destinations because existing Zairian migrant communities and trade networks made it easier for newcomers to settle.

Research shows that many Congolese who moved to Paris during the 1980s turned to trade and small business after facing limited opportunities at home. Some had struggled in school because of stricter education policies introduced under structural adjustment programs, while others found that university degrees no longer guaranteed jobs in the civil service. High unemployment and low-paying government jobs also pushed many to leave. Most migrants came from the urban centers of Kinshasa, but others arrived from different regions of the country. The migration process was primarily supported by informal networks of family members, friends, and earlier migrants, who shared information about travel, housing, jobs, and business opportunities. Some people also traveled with forged documents or received help from intermediaries who arranged their trips. Many youths from Ndjili were especially familiar with administrative procedures and informal ways of organizing migration, which made the commune an important center for migration networks.

According to socio-anthropologists Rémy Bazenguissa-Ganga and Janet MacGaffey, moving to France did not always solve the economic problems faced by Congolese migrants. Many who had university degrees or had worked in the public sector in Zaire could only find manual labor jobs or remained unemployed despite their education. Others without legal residence permits faced even greater challenges because they had little access to legal jobs. Many were therefore excluded from economic opportunities in both Zaire and France. Many youths turned to the informal economy to support themselves. They imported African food, ran grocery stores selling African products, worked as street vendors, operated informal bars known as nganda, drove unlicensed taxis, worked as photographers at weddings and community events, exported used cars to Zaire for use as taxis, and imported clothing, shoes, perfumes, jewelry, and textiles from other European countries. Much of this work was carried out without business licenses or legal residency. Although French authorities were aware of many of these activities, enforcement was inconsistent.

Men and women often had different roles within the informal economy. Men mainly worked in transportation, import-export businesses, automobile exports, photography, and sometimes the trade of stolen goods or contraband. Women were more active in selling African food, textiles, beauty products, and hair care services. They also managed nganda bars and worked as street vendors. Many women maintained trade connections with West African countries, especially Benin and Togo, where they bought wax-print fabrics (pagnes) to sell in France. Many Zairian traders also spent a large part of their income on fashionable clothing, luxury goods, and nightlife associated with the La Sape. Instead of focusing on saving money, they sought public recognition by dressing well and showing generosity. Wearing designer clothes, buying drinks for friends, and spending lavishly in nganda were seen as signs of social status. Many described this way of life as vivre ("living"), viewing these expenses as a way to build prestige, reputation, and social standing within the migrant community.

=== Republic of the Congo ===
==== Background of migration ====
During the colonial period in what is now the Republic of the Congo (Congo-Brazzaville), studying in France was seen as the best opportunity for the educated African elite. Education gave them the chance to move abroad and continue their training. Because they had the option to leave, many focused more on protecting their social position than taking part in political movements in the Congo, especially as conflicts over power became more serious after the country's independence in 1960.

From 1897 until the 1930s, the territory of the present-day Republic of the Congo was controlled by concessionary companies. During this time, secondary education for African students was organized across French Equatorial Africa, bringing together students from what are now Chad, Ubangi-Shari, Gabon, and the French Congo. In the 1930s, the colonial government gradually expanded public education by opening the Édouard Renard School (École Supérieure Edouard Renard or École Edouard Renard) in Brazzaville in 1935 to train future civil servants, and after the Second World War, these education policies became more successful. The colony's first high school graduates and trainees were then sent to France to continue their education through the Cooperation program. This development was part of the colonial government's growing investment in education, which had first depended on Catholic and Protestant missions. During the 1940s and 1950s, these missions trained many catechists and African teaching assistants, with more than 380 trained by 1946, who were able to reach many communities that the colonial government had not served.

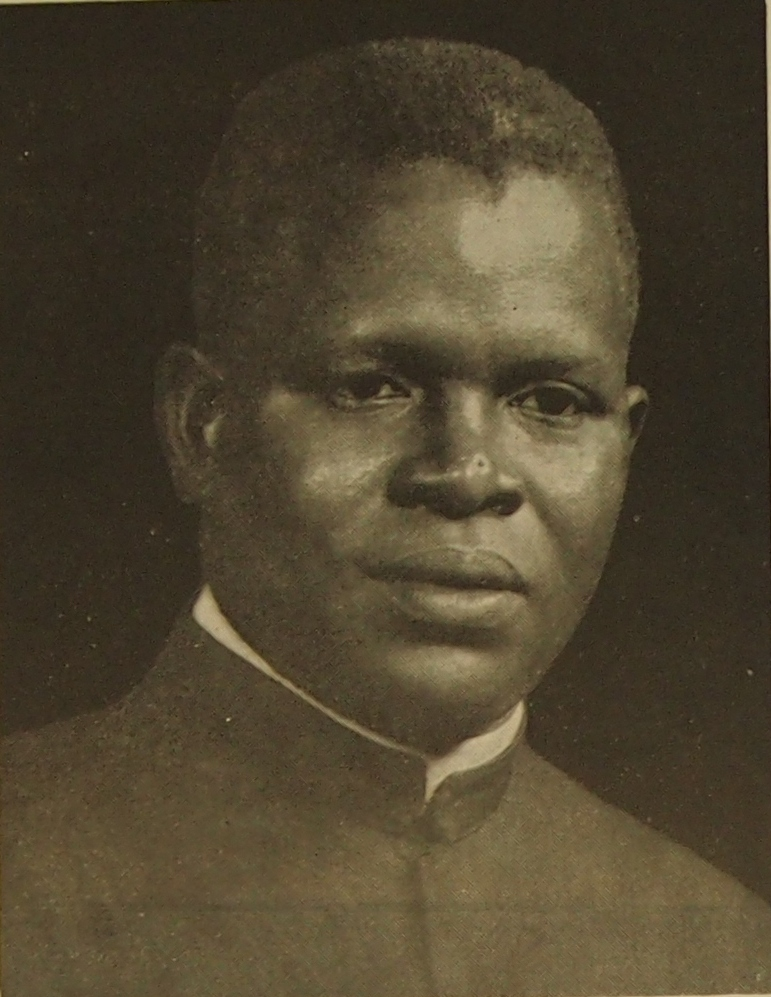
After independence, President Fulbert Youlou maintained the colonial education system by continuing government scholarships for students studying in France.

When the Republic of the Congo became independent, it largely kept the education system created during the colonial period. Instead of ending the scholarship programs, President Fulbert Youlou's government continued to support students studying in France through state scholarships. The government also bought student housing in Paris and later signed agreements with the Centres Régionaux des Oeuvres Universitaires et Scolaires (CROUS) to reserve university housing for Congolese students. In the 1950s and 1960s, studying abroad was the main reason Congolese people moved to France. Unlike later waves of workers who migrated for jobs, these students usually came from socially privileged backgrounds or had earned their place through a highly competitive school system. Most followed a clear educational path, starting in mission or colonial primary schools, moving on to secondary schools in French Equatorial Africa, studying at universities in France, and then returning to the Congo to work in public service.

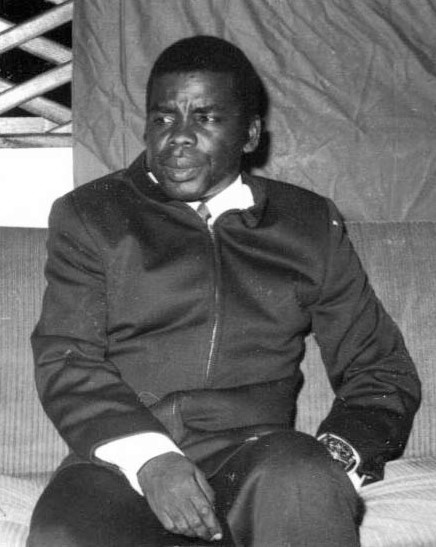
Under President Marien Ngouabi's Marxist-Leninist government, established in 1969, many politicians, academics, and civil servants linked to earlier administrations were removed through political purges, which then led many educated Congolese to seek refuge in France.

French universities were not only places for learning but also important spaces for building political and professional connections. Congolese students maintained close contact with ministers, diplomats, and political leaders, often seeking better scholarships and housing. Many later became university professors, government ministers, members of parliament, senior civil servants, diplomats, and teachers. The Three Glorious Days Revolution in 1963 ended Youlou's presidency and brought Alphonse Massamba-Débat to power, who appointed numerous France-educated Congolese to senior government positions. More France-educated graduates became involved in politics, with some serving as university professors and members of parliament. After 1968, growing political unrest changed the future of many people in this educated group. When Marien Ngouabi came to power and introduced a Marxist-Leninist government, many political and academic leaders were removed because of their political beliefs. Those connected to earlier governments often became political opponents or were forced into exile. For many Congolese intellectuals, France was no longer only a place to study but also a place where they could live safely after leaving their country.

Sociologist Guy Boudimbou, whose research examines immigrants from the Republic of the Congo, states that the biggest wave of migration to France happened in the mid-1970s after labor immigration was suspended in 1974. The Congo-Brazzaville population in France was estimated at 13,000 people, although Boudimbou believed the actual number was higher. A proportion of migrants arriving during the late 1980s did not appear in official statistics as Congolese nationals. Some were registered as refugees from neighboring or nearby countries, such as Zaire, the Central African Republic, Angola, or Chad, while others remained outside administrative records altogether. Migration remained high during the 1980s but later declined as France adopted stricter asylum policies. Boudimbou notes that Congolese migration was mostly made up of men, while women usually arrived later through family reunification, often as spouses. Some young Congolese women increasingly migrated independently to Paris in search of marriage partners rather than waiting to marry before emigrating. However, Boudimbou stresses that these reports are hard to prove and could be based on rumors. Even so, he suggests that the limited marriage opportunities among Congolese in the Paris area may point to a gradual change in migration patterns, making the flow less male-dominated than it had been in the past.

During the 1990s, political crises and civil wars caused even more Congolese to migrate for political reasons. Many people from government, education, journalism, and professional fields went to France after facing violence or instability. When Denis Sassou Nguesso returned to power in 1997 after the country's most destructive civil war, many exiles lost hope that political changes would allow them to return permanently. France therefore remained a temporary destination for students and a permanent place of residence for many Congolese refugees and professionals.

==== The wave of the "Grands" ====
Unlike migrants from countries such as Mali, Senegal, or Mauritania, whose migration to France was largely linked to labor recruitment, Congolese migrants originated predominantly from urban centers, particularly Brazzaville and, to a lesser extent, Pointe-Noire. Most were young men under the age of 25 and generally had relatively high levels of formal education. Members of the Kongo ethnic group made up a large share of the migrant population. According to Boudimbou, the first major wave of migration was not mainly driven by economic reasons. Instead, many traveled to France to receive vocational training before returning to the Republic of the Congo to build their professional careers. For unemployed young people without technical skills, migration offered a chance to gain training that was not available at home. Those who already had jobs saw training in France as a way to improve their qualifications and move forward in their careers.

Boudimbou describes the first generation of Congolese migrants who arrived in the 1970s as a close-knit group that later became known in the community as the grands ("the established" or "the successful"). After completing vocational training through work or specialized training centers, many found skilled jobs in France. Although they had initially planned to return to the Republic of the Congo after gaining professional experience, many ended up staying in France because they had built careers and achieved a degree of socioeconomic stability there. The sapeurs during this time in France also developed their own form of resistance through visibility, expressed in their extravagant clothing and their attachment to designer fashion.

==== The wave of the "Adventurers" ====
The second major wave of Congolese migrants had several things in common with the first, such as coming mainly from cities and having relatively good levels of education, but differed in significant respects. This group was mostly made up of unemployed youths with more varied educational backgrounds and less clear plans for the future. Instead of mainly going to France for vocational training, many combined wage employment with small informal businesses, such as selling clothes and beauty products. Boudimbou uses the term aventuriers ("adventurers") to describe migrants who financed their own migration without receiving scholarships or financial assistance from the Congolese government. Researcher Justin-Daniel Gandoulou similarly applies the term to migrants seeking social advancement in France. Historian Manuel Charpy adds that the term also reflects the search for recognition and prestige, often shown through fashion and appearance. Besides the aventuriers, Boudimbou identifies other groups of migrants, including trainee civil servants, scholarship recipients financed by either the Congolese or French governments, and students supported by relatives. Although scholarship recipients and trainee civil servants were generally expected to return to the Republic of the Congo after finishing their studies, he notes that only trainee civil servants usually did so because returning allowed them to keep their government jobs. Many former students, however, remained in France because they found better opportunities there than at home.

==== Social mobility and status ====
Boudimbou explains that rising unemployment disproportionately affected less-qualified migrants, while former students and skilled workers were more likely to find stable jobs and settle permanently. As a result, the Congolese community in France became more divided between those who achieved professional success and those who continued to face economic difficulties. According to Boudimbou, migration to France has remained closely associated with aspirations for upward social mobility regardless of migrants' backgrounds or migration pathways. Whether they arrived as self-financed aventuriers, scholarship students, or skilled workers, many hoped to become grands.

Being considered a grand was based on more than age, but also required clear signs of financial and social success. Having a steady job, owning a home or living in good housing, furnishing a comfortable home, and hosting large social gatherings were all seen as signs of status. Weddings, in particular, became important events where people showed their wealth and wore fashionable clothing. Boudimbou notes that dressing well could sometimes hide differences in occupation, making manual workers and senior officials appear similar at first. Even so, migrants did not all experience the same social progress. Some who had held secure jobs in the Republic of the Congo faced fewer work opportunities in France and experienced a decline in their social position. Others, especially unemployed migrants who gained vocational skills and stable jobs, or students who later entered professional or management positions, improved their social standing.

==== Housing and residential ====
Most Congolese immigrants did not obtain independent accommodation immediately after they arrived in France. Instead, they were generally accommodated by relatives, friends, or other compatriots already established in the country. After finding their own place, many moved into older private rental housing, which was often overcrowded, poorly maintained, and didn't have basic amenities. Small furnished hotels, workers' hostels, maid's rooms (chambres de bonne), and old apartment buildings were common starting points for many migrants. Because affordable housing was limited, overcrowding was common. Small studio apartments meant for one or two people were often shared by large families or several unrelated migrants. Public housing (habitations à loyer modéré; HLMs) offered larger apartments, lower rents, and more stable living conditions than most private rentals, making it especially attractive to growing families. People usually applied for HLM housing after getting married, bringing family members to France, having children, or spending years in overcrowded private housing. Many waited several years before receiving an apartment. Once they obtained HLM housing, many stayed there for a long time because the lower rent allowed them to save money or improve their financial situation. As more Congolese immigrants settled permanently in France, owning a home became an increasingly important goal. Earlier migrants had often viewed public housing as the highest step in their housing journey, but over time many came to see homeownership as the true sign of success. Many who had once planned to return to the Republic of the Congo eventually accepted that they would remain in France. However, only a small number were able to buy a home. High costs, unstable jobs, and difficulty getting mortgages prevented many from becoming homeowners.

Housing was also one of the main signs of social success. Where a person lived and the quality of their home strongly influenced how they were viewed within the Congolese community. Boudimbou explains that some migrants deliberately avoided HLMs or communes with large immigrant populations, although their motivations varied. For migrants who experienced downward mobility, avoiding such quartiers ("neighborhoods") helped hide their loss of status compared with the lives they had in the Republic of the Congo. Many Congolese judged a migrant's success by looking at their housing. This is reflected in the phrase wa lenda, which means "he has succeeded". The expression recognizes that a person has reached the goals they hoped to achieve through migration. Because many migrants' jobs did not always reflect their standard of living, Boudimbou believes that housing provides a better way to understand social mobility and different levels of success.

== Demographics ==
=== Population ===
==== Descendants of Congolese immigrants from Republic of the Congo ====
The 1999 census showed that African immigration to France had significantly changed. Other African countries became more important sources of immigrants during this period. Senegalese and Malian communities remained the largest groups, with 53,900 immigrants from Senegal (a 29% increase since 1990) and 46,000 from Mali (a 25% increase). Their growth was slower compared to other African communities. For example, the number of immigrants from Côte d'Ivoire increased from 19,137 to 30,000 (+58% over nine years), while the Cameroonian population rose from 18,130 to 27,000 (+48%).

Among immigrants from former French colonies in sub-Saharan Africa, Congo-Brazzaville nationals remained the fifth-largest group, following Senegal, Mali, Côte d'Ivoire, and Cameroon. The number of Congo-Brazzaville immigrants increased steadily, rising from 1,172 in 1968 to 3,435 in 1975, 8,940 in 1982, and 12,755 in 1990. The 1999 census suggested that this population had more than doubled, reaching about 33,418 people, which represented a 162% increase. However, Jean-Baptiste Douma, a sociologist at Paris Nanterre University, argued that this estimate may not be accurate. He explained that the figure may have been affected by confusion in French census records after Zaire became the Democratic Republic of the Congo in 1997, since both countries were often identified using the name "Congo". Because of this, some statistics may have included people from both countries by mistake. When both Congos were counted together, the reported increase was 58%. Applying this growth rate only to Congolese from Brazzaville would give an estimated population of around 20,153. If the growth rate from 1982 to 1990 had continued, the estimate would have been closer to 19,020. In later years, the population was estimated at 47,900 in 2008, 55,300 in 2013, and 68,600 in 2018.

==== Descendants of Congolese immigrants from the Democratic Republic of the Congo ====
According to the National Institute of Statistics and Economic Studies (Institut national de la statistique et des études économiques; INSEE), there were 37,100 descendants of immigrants from the Democratic Republic of the Congo living in France in 2008. Their number later rose to 47,900 in 2013 and 63,500 in 2018. A report by the French Office for the Protection of Refugees and Stateless Persons (Office français de protection des réfugiés et apatrides; OFPRA) showed that people from the Democratic Republic of the Congo submitted the highest number of asylum applications in France in 2025, with nearly 12,000 requests. They ranked ahead of applicants from Afghanistan and Ukraine. This increase followed the sharp decline in security in eastern Congo, especially after the M23 rebel group captured Goma and Bukavu at the beginning of 2025.

==== Combined population from both Congos ====
Combined, the descendants of immigrants from the Democratic Republic of the Congo and the Republic of the Congo form one of the largest populations of sub-Saharan African descent in France. INSEE estimated that there were 85,000 descendants of immigrants from both Congos in 2008. This total increased to 103,200 in 2013 and reached 132,100 by 2018.

Population census	2018	2013	2008
Congolese (Republic of the Congo)	68,600	55,300	47,900
Congolese (Democratic Republic of the Congo)	63,500	47,900	37,100

Source: Institut national de la statistique et des études économiques; INSEE.

Sociologist Valentina Nava conducted one of the most comprehensive quantitative analyses on the populations of Congo-Brazzaville and Congo-Kinshasa in France using data from the Trajectories and Origins (Trajectoires et Origines, TeO) survey jointly administered by the French National Institute for Demographic Studies (Institut national d'études démographiques; INED) and the INSEE in 2008. Published in 2023, Nava's study looked at around 17,934 weighted observations of Congolese immigrant descendants living in metropolitan France. Her estimates show that descendants of immigrants from Congo-Brazzaville made up about 53% of the population, while those from Congo-Kinshasa represented 47%. This population is generally young. In 2008, the median age was 24 years, and most people were between 19 and 27 years old. Women made up a slight majority, accounting for 56% of the population, compared with 44% men.

=== Education ===
The level of education among descendants of Congolese immigrants differed greatly. Approximately one-third had completed only lower secondary education, while around one-quarter had earned a baccalauréat. Another quarter had continued their studies and completed higher education beyond the Bac+2 level. The TeO survey also showed strong signs of educational progress between generations. Many participants achieved higher levels of education than their fathers, especially those whose fathers had limited schooling. However, parents' education continued to influence their children's educational paths, as nearly half of those who stopped after primary or lower-secondary school had fathers with no formal education, while those who reached postgraduate levels were disproportionately likely to have fathers with university degrees.

==== Employment and parents' education ====
The TeO survey showed that about 48% of Congolese immigrant descendants were employed, while 37% were studying and approximately 8% were unemployed. The most common occupations included students, private-sector workers in intermediate positions, teachers, administrative workers, sales workers, healthcare workers, police and military employees, and service workers. Women were more likely to be students and were especially common in healthcare, administrative roles, retail, and personal service work. Men were disproportionately focused on construction, industry, transportation, technical jobs, and police or military positions. They were also slightly more likely not to be active in the labor market.

Parents of Congolese immigrant descendants generally had higher education levels compared with many other immigrant-origin groups. Fathers generally had higher levels of education than mothers. Among fathers, 44% had education beyond Bac+2, 17% had a Bac+2 qualification, and only 11% had no formal diploma. Among mothers, about 23% had qualifications above Bac+2, 30% had a baccalauréat, and 13% had no diploma.

=== Residence and housing ===
The TeO survey found that most descendants of Congolese immigrants live in urban areas. Approximately 88% lived in communes with more than 10,000 residents, with the largest numbers located in the Île-de-France region. According to the 2022 Île-de-France census, the region had 54,091 descendants of immigrants from the Democratic Republic of the Congo and 46,013 from the Republic of the Congo, for a combined total of 100,104.

The main areas of residence as of 2008
Paris (Île-de-France)
Seine-et-Marne (Île-de-France)
Yvelines (Île-de-France)
Essonne (Île-de-France)
Hauts-de-Seine (Île-de-France)
Seine-Saint-Denis (Île-de-France)
Val-de-Marne (Île-de-France)
Val-d'Oise (Île-de-France)
Champagne-Ardenne
Picardy
Upper Normandy
Centre-Val de Loire
Lower Normandy
Burgundy
Nord-Pas-de-Calais
Lorraine
Alsace
Franche-Comté
Pays de la Loire
Brittany
Poitou-Charentes
Aquitaine
Midi-Pyrénées
Limousin
Rhône-Alpes
Auvergne
Languedoc-Roussillon
Provence-Alpes-Côte d'Azur

More than half lived in large apartment buildings with at least ten housing units. Their housing types included 11% living in detached houses (2,007 people), 12% in townhouses (2,104), 15% in smaller apartment buildings with 3 to 9 units (2,776), and 53% in apartment buildings with 10 or more units (9,480). A smaller share lived in temporary housing, such as trailers or caravans (2.7%, or 478 people), while 6.1% lived in other types of housing (1,090 people).

More than half of this population lived in IRIS quartiers with a high number of HLM housing units. In terms of household structure, about one-third lived in households made up of a couple with at least one child. Other household types included single-person households (23%, or 4,149 people), single-parent families (24%, or 4,266), couples without children (6.6%, or 1,186), couples with children (36%, or 6,436), and other household arrangements (11%, or 1,897).

Many descendants of Congolese immigrants lived in quartiers with high housing density, substantial concentrations of HLM housing, comparatively high proportions of immigrant residents, and significant shares of immigrants originating from sub-Saharan Africa. These areas often had higher unemployment rates, lower household incomes, and a strong immigrant presence. However, some also lived in quartiers with many university graduates and a high number of professional workers.

== Notable people ==
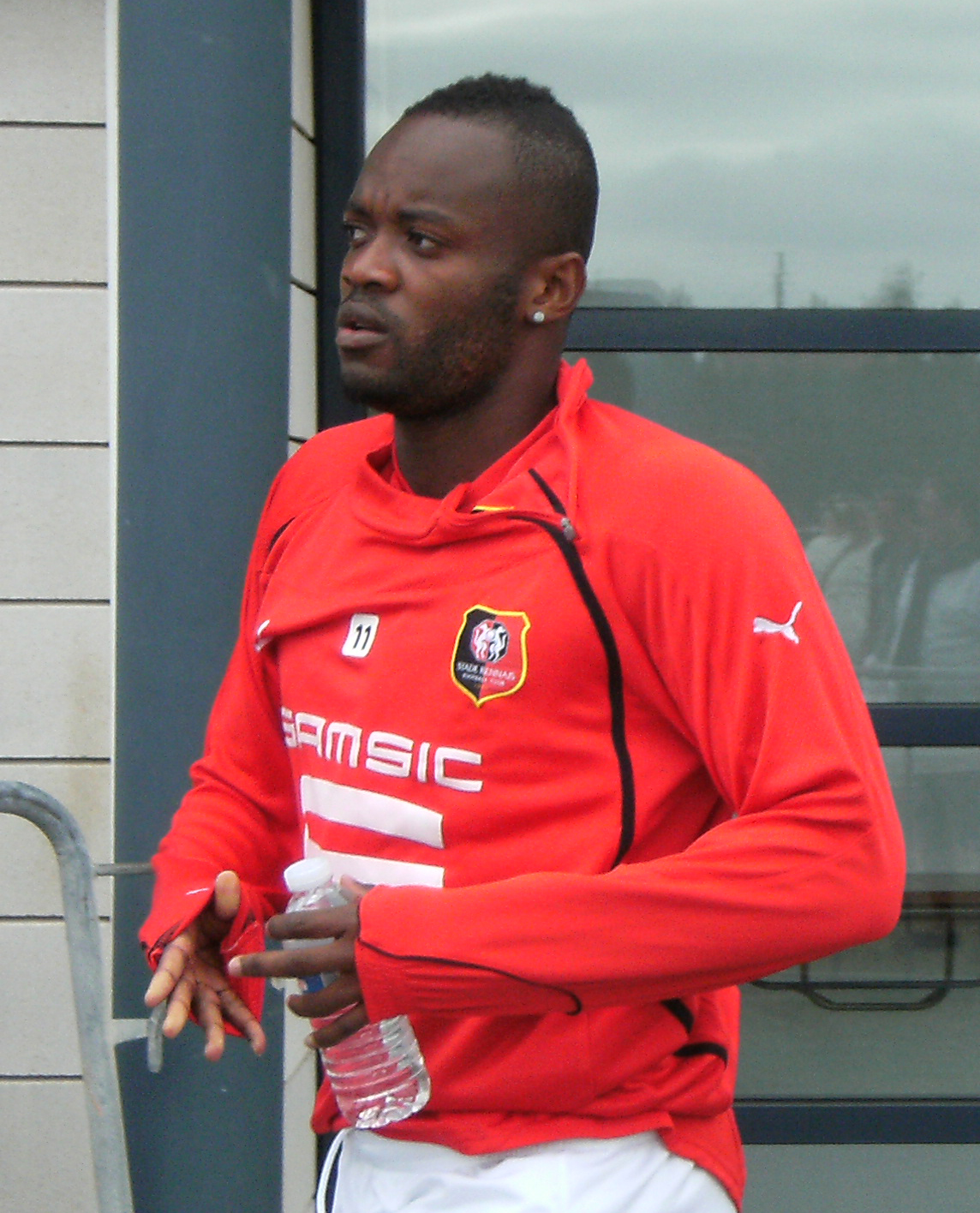
Jirès Kembo Ekoko

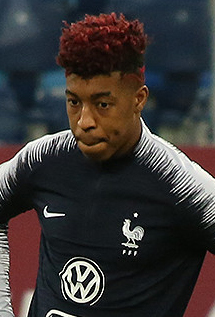
Presnel Kimpembe

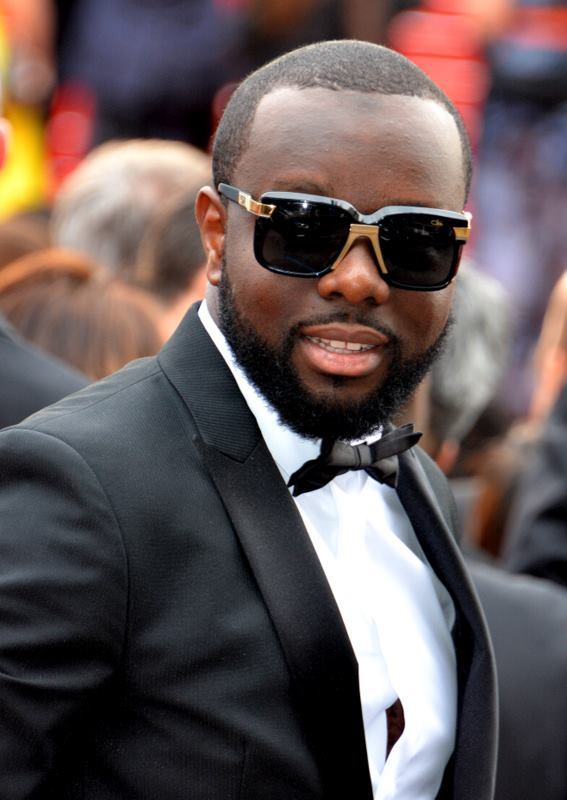
Gims (Gandhi Djuna)

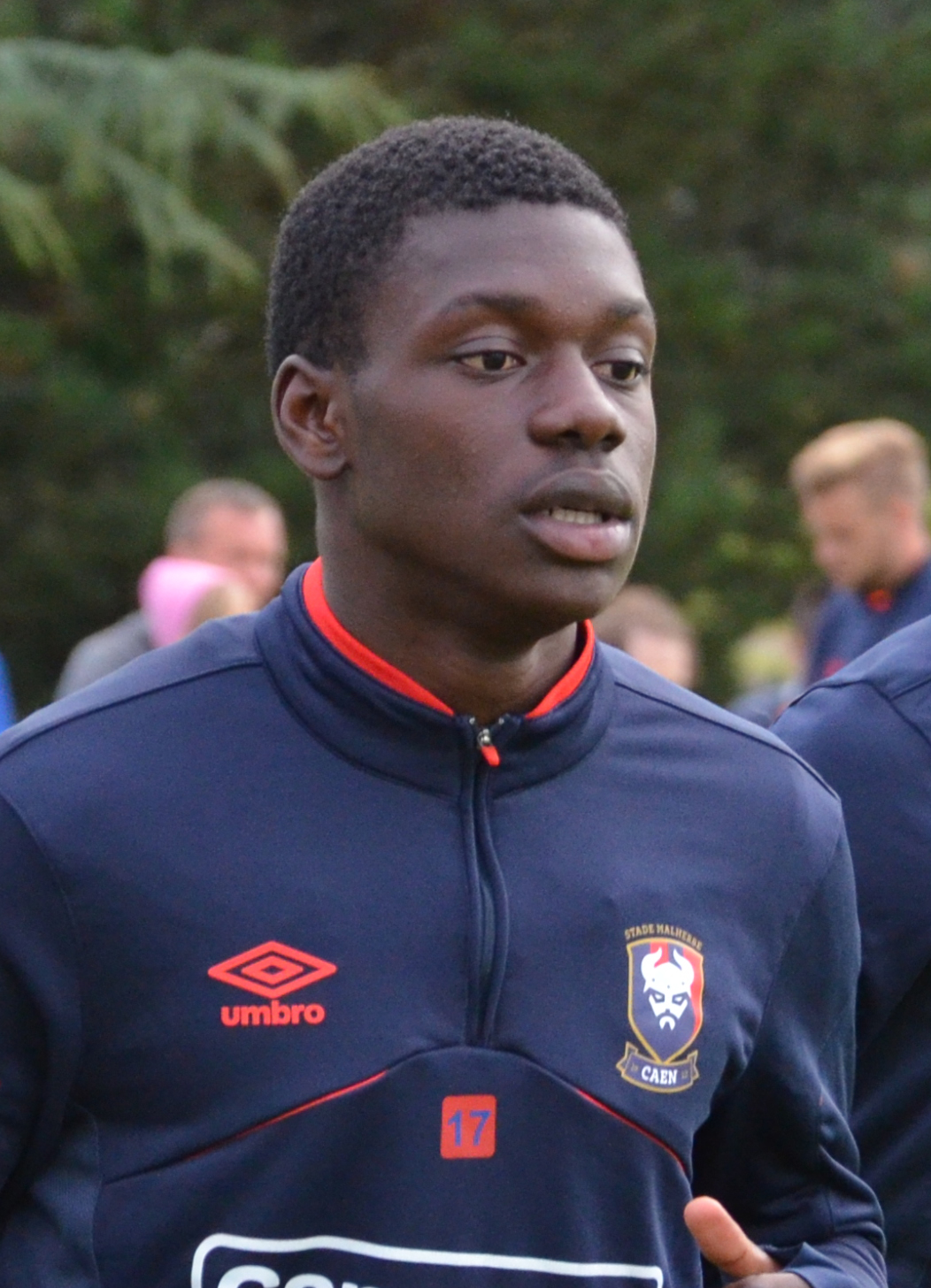
Jean-Victor Makengo

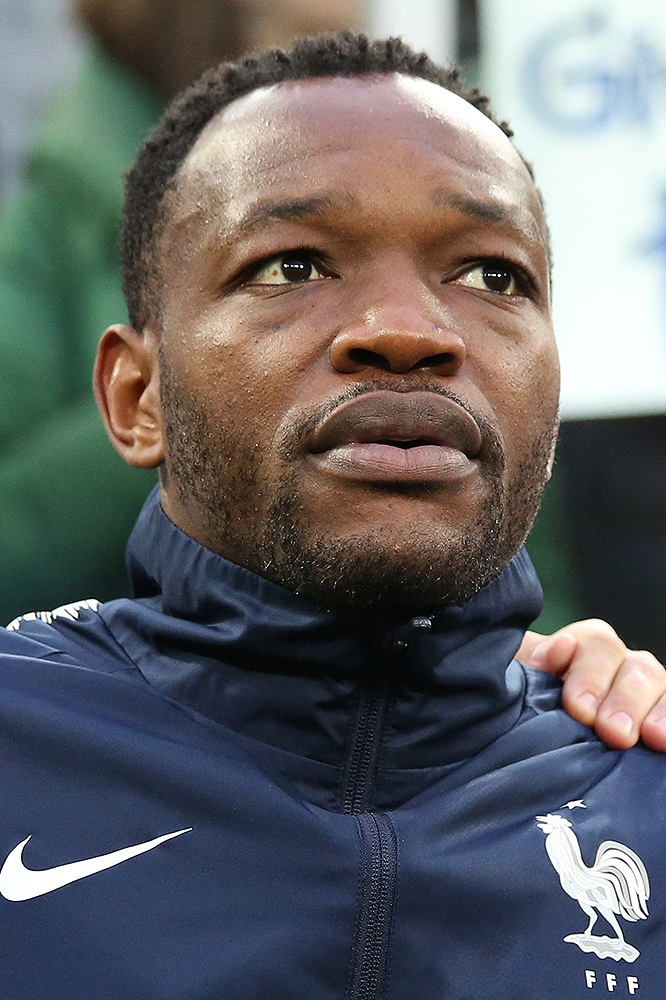
Steve Mandanda

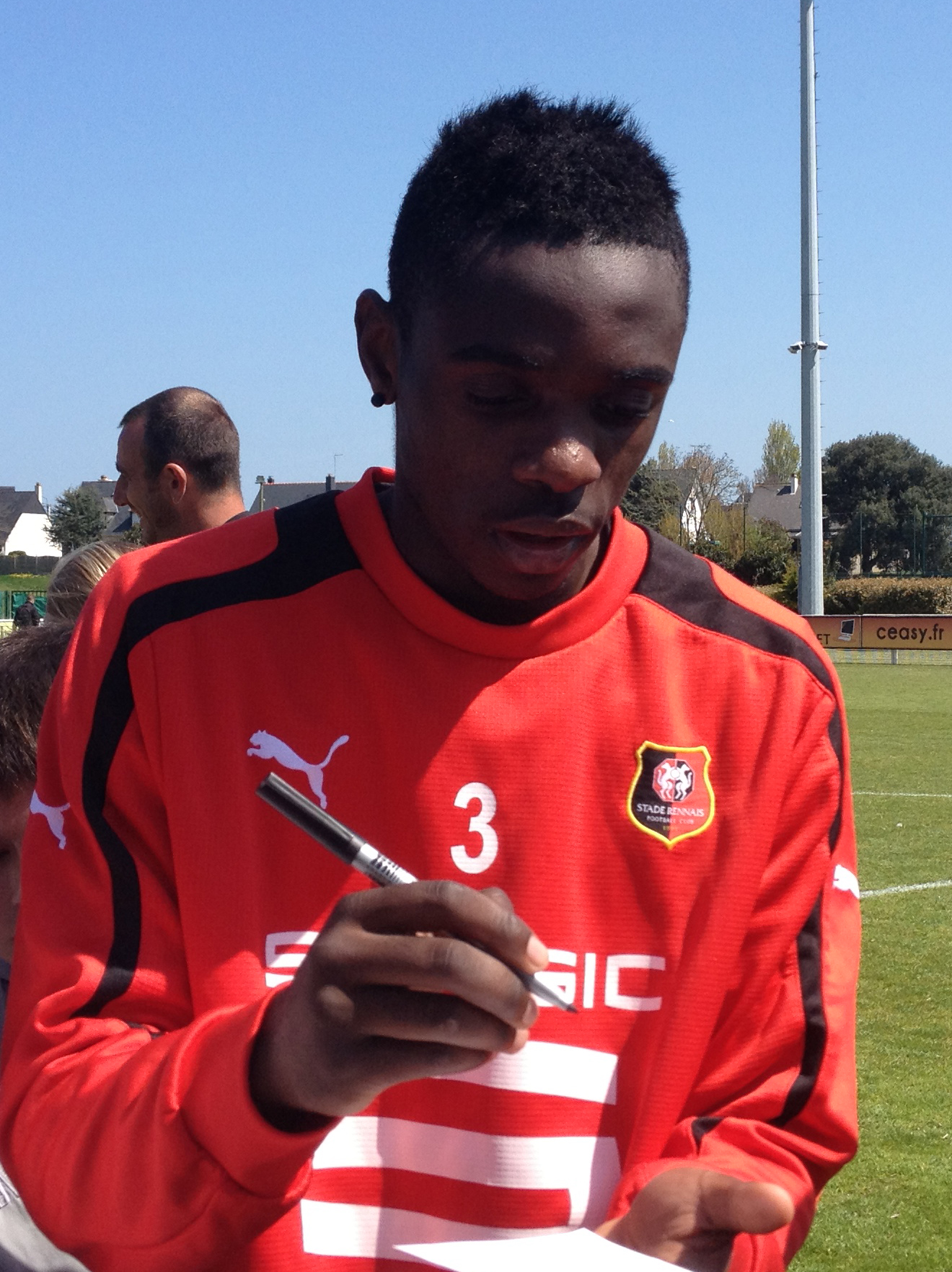
Chris Mavinga

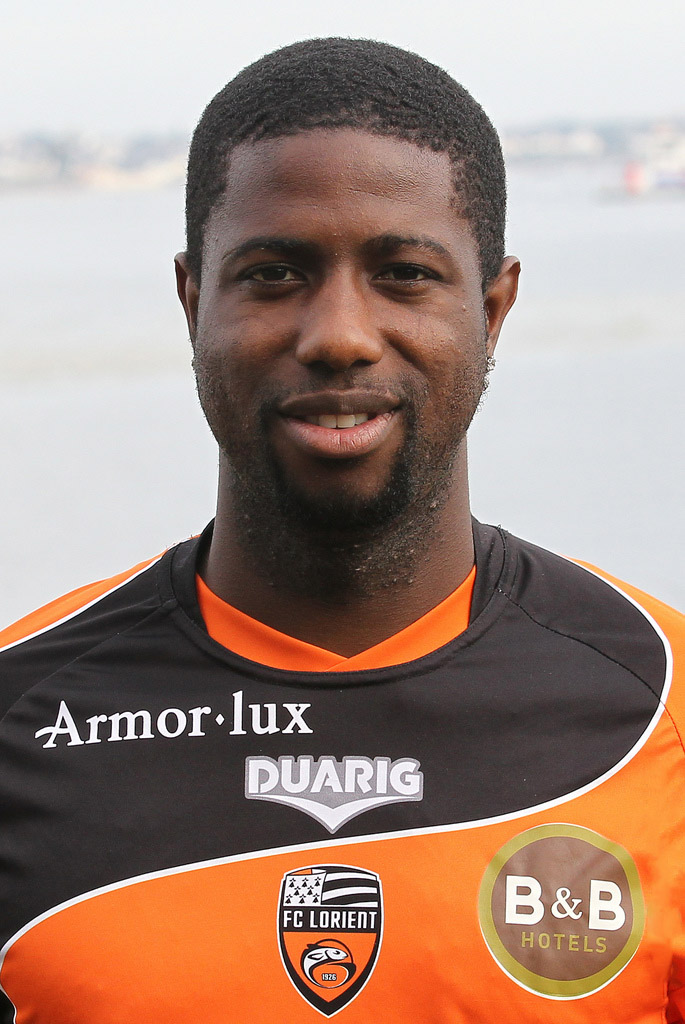
Arnold Mvuemba

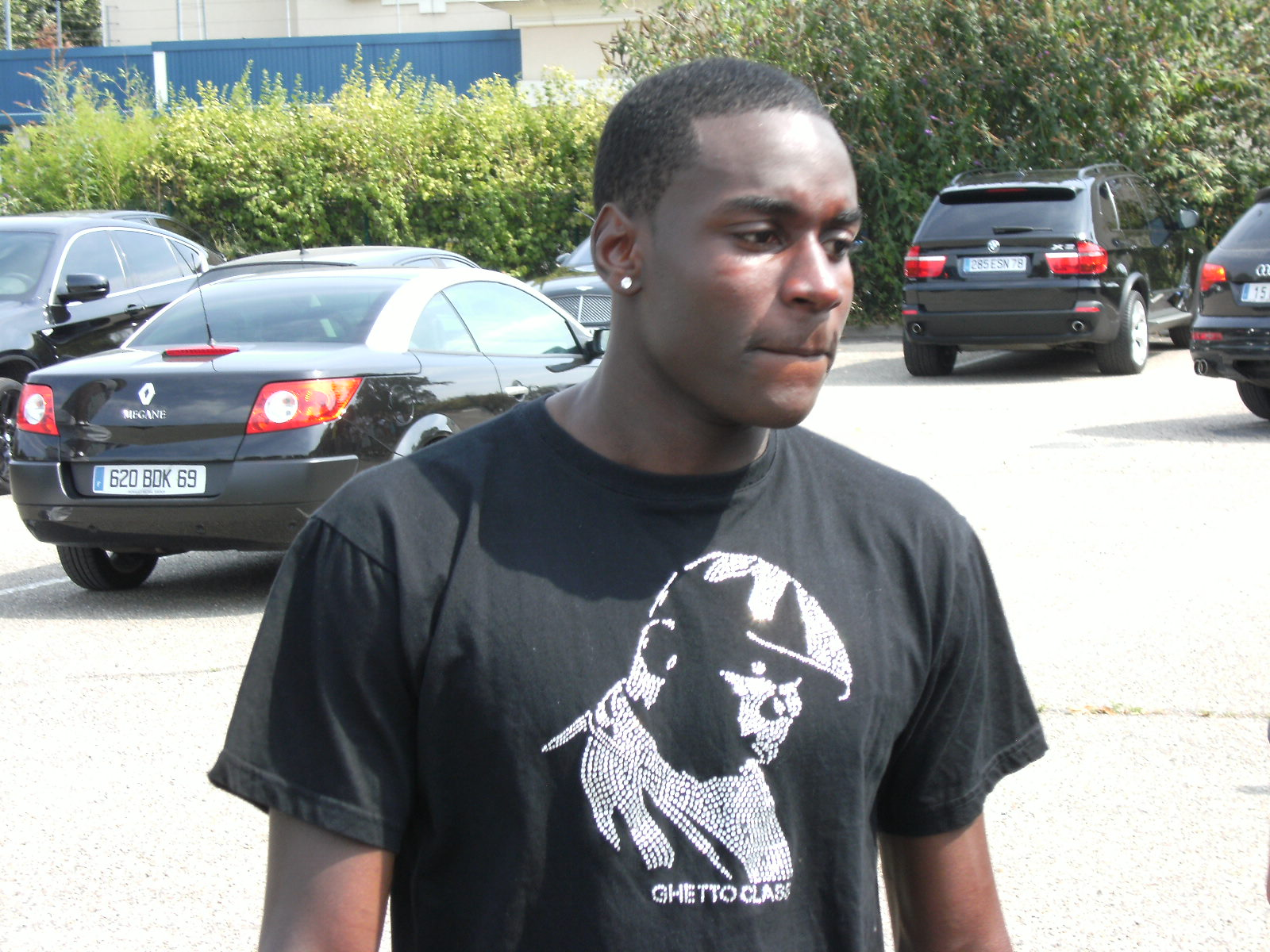
Granddi Ngoyi

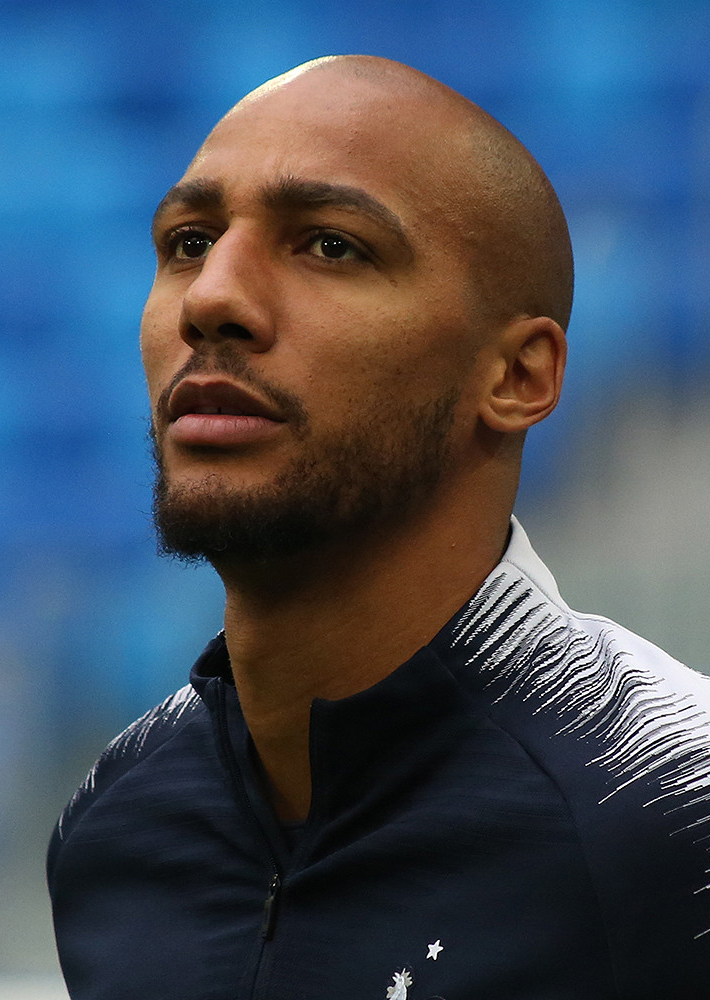
Steven Nzonzi

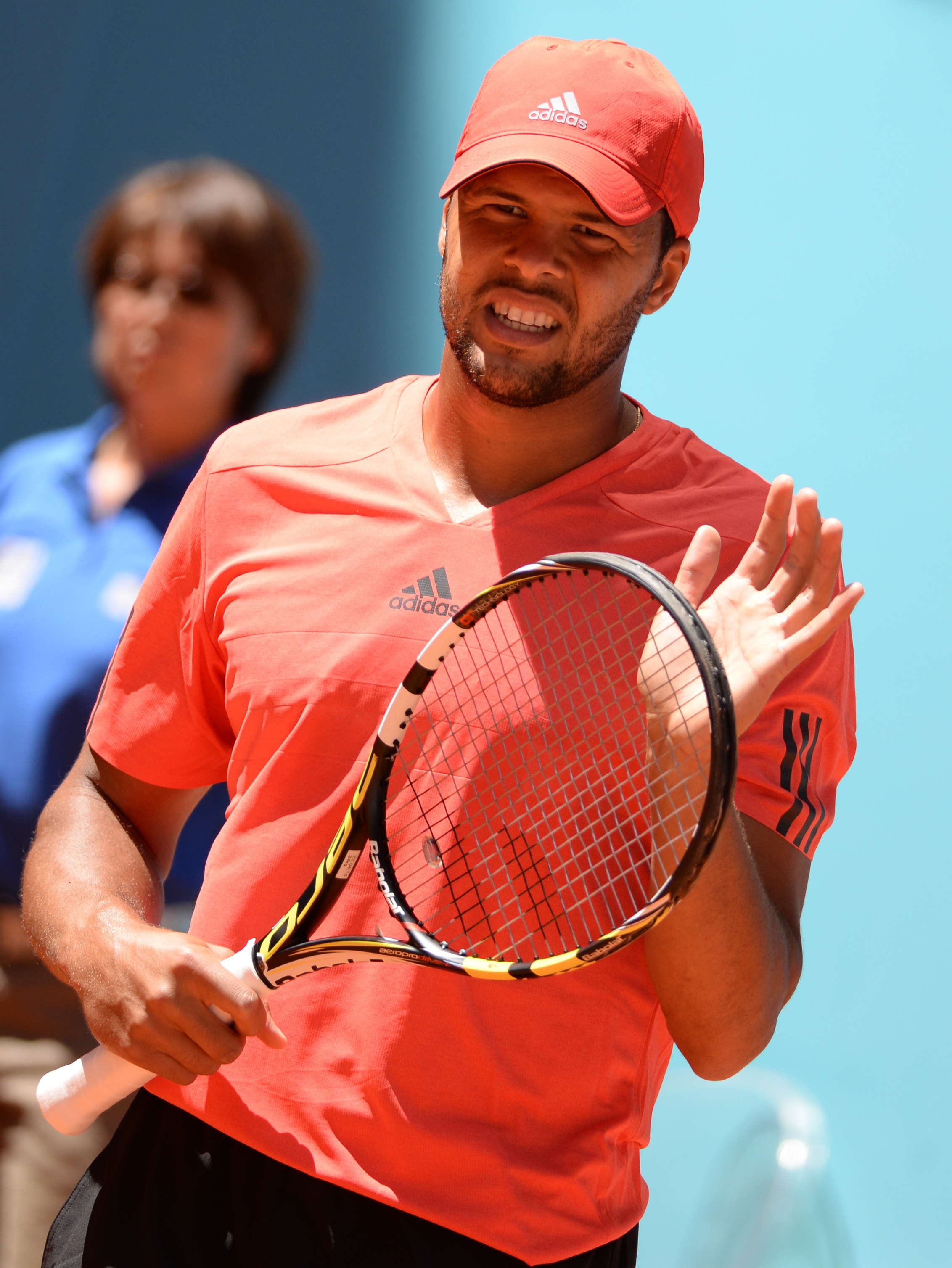
Jo-Wilfried Tsonga

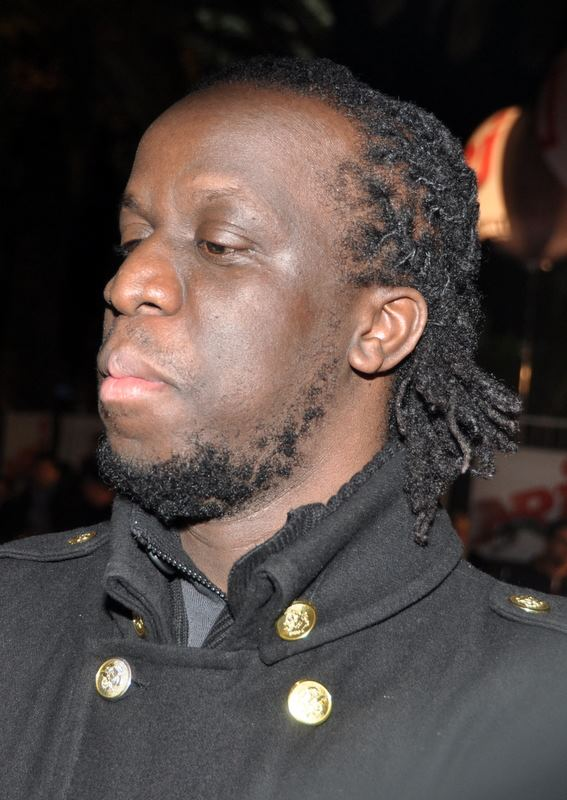
Youssoupha

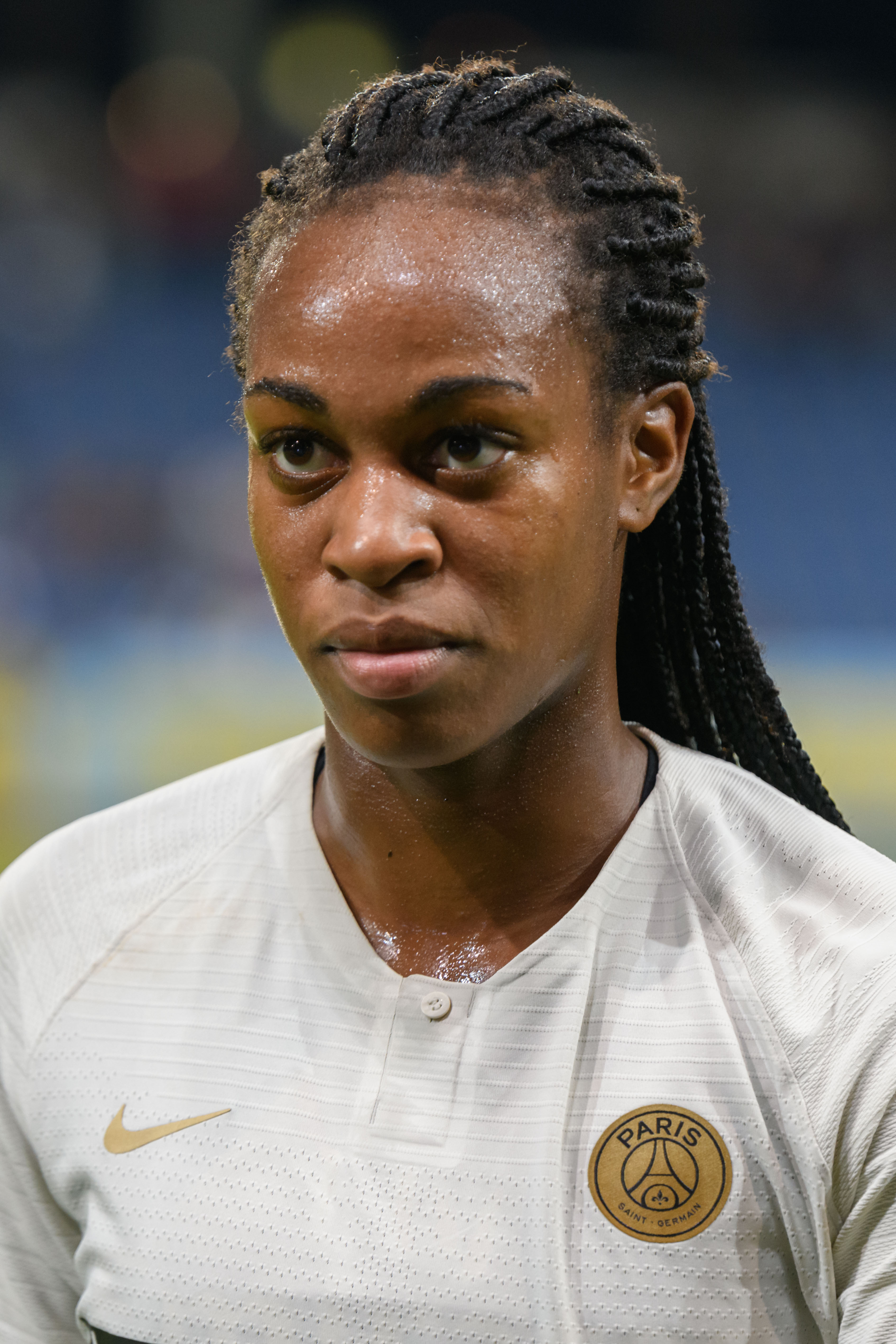
Marie-Antoinette Katoto

== See also ==
- France–Republic of the Congo relations
- Democratic Republic of the Congo–France relations
