= Chris Roulhac =

American football player and coach (born 1947)

Biographical details
- Born: 1947 (age 78–79)

Playing career
- 1967–1968: Albany State
- 1969: Norfolk Neptunes
- Position: Tight end

Coaching career (HC unless noted)
- 1977–1981: Simon Gratz HS (PA)
- 1982–1984: George Washington HS (PA)
- 1985–1988: West Chester (OB)
- 1989–1991: Colgate (OB)
- 1992–1994: Cheyney
- 1995–1999: Temple (assistant)
- ?: Ottawa Rough Riders (assistant)
- 2009–2014: Cheyney (assistant)
- 2015–2017: Cheyney

Head coaching record
- Overall: 5–61 (college)

Accomplishments and honors

Awards
- PSAC Coach of the Year (1993)

Christopher Roulhac III (born 1947) is an American football coach and former player. He served two stints as the head football coach at the Cheyney University of Pennsylvania from 1992 to 1994 and 2015 to 2017, compiling a record of 5–61. Roulhac played college football at Albany State College in Albany, Georgia.

== Head coaching record ==
=== College ===
Year	Team	Overall	Conference	Standing	Bowl/playoffs
Cheyney Wolves (Pennsylvania State Athletic Conference) (1992–1994)
1992	Cheyney	0–11	0–6	7th (Eastern)	
1993	Cheyney	3–8	1–5	6th (Eastern)	
1994	Cheyney	0–11	0–6	7th (Eastern)	
Cheyney Wolves (Pennsylvania State Athletic Conference) (2015–2017)
2015	Cheyney	0–11	0–7	8th (Eastern)	
2016	Cheyney	1–10	0–7	8th (Eastern)	
2017	Cheyney	1–10	0–7	8th (Eastern)	
Cheyney:		5–61	1–38		
Total:		5–61			
