= Ealy =

Ealy may refer to the following people:

Given name

- Ealy Mays (born 1959), African-American contemporary artist

Middle name

- Samuel Ealy Johnson Jr. (1877–1937), American businessman and politician
- Samuel Ealy Johnson Sr. (1838–1915), American businessman, politician, cattleman, and soldier

Surname

- Adrian Ealy (born 1999), American football player
- Biren Ealy (born 1984), American football player
- Charles H. Ealy (1884–1947), American politician
- Jerrion Ealy (born 2000), American football player
- Kony Ealy (born 1991), American football player
- Michael Ealy (born 1973), American actor
