= Bernie Kaplan =

American football player (1913–1992)

- Kaplan in 1936

No. 55, 77
- Position: Guard

Personal information
- Born: May 7, 1913; Philadelphia, Pennsylvania, U.S.
- Died: June 14, 1992 (aged 79)
- Listed height: 5 ft 11 in (1.80 m)
- Listed weight: 195 lb (88 kg)

Career information
- High school: Simon Gratz (PA)
- College: McDaniel College

Career history
- 1935–1936: New York Giants
- 1942: Philadelphia Eagles

Career statistics
- Games played: 22
- Starts: 8

Bernard "Champ" Kaplan (May 7, 1913 – June 14, 1992) was an American football offensive lineman in the National Football League for the New York Giants and the Philadelphia Eagles.

A two-time national collegiate boxing champion in the light heavyweight class, Kaplan signed with Philadelphia fight manager Joe Jacobs in 1935 and was touted as "The Jewish Jack Dempsey" and a potential contender for the heavyweight boxing title, fighting at 189 pounds.

== Biography ==
=== Early life ===
Bernie Kaplan was born May 7, 1913, in Philadelphia, Pennsylvania. He attended Simon Gratz High School in that city. Playing football for the Simon Gratz team, Kaplan won recognition as an All-Public High School lineman as a senior in 1929-30.

=== College career ===
Kaplan attended Western Maryland College (now known as McDaniel College), located in Westminster, Maryland, a suburb of Baltimore. A powerful athlete, Kaplan was runner up in the light heavyweight classification in the 1930–31 Middle Atlantic Wrestling Championships.

He also played college football for the Green Terror, starting at the guard position — playing both offense and defense as was done in this single-platoon era.

As a junior in 1933, Western Maryland finished with a record of 5–3. The 1934 team of Kaplan's senior season was something of a juggernaut, however, racking up a record of 8–0–1, pitching an astounding 8 shutouts while allowing just 12 points all year.

Kaplan was best known during his college years as a skilled amateur boxer, winning the Eastern Intercollegiate Boxing Association and national collegiate championships as a light heavyweight (175-pound) as a sophomore in 1933 and again as a junior in 1934.

Kaplan turned his attention back to wrestling only in the spring of 1935, winning a tournament to earn a place on the American team for the 1935 Maccabiah Games, also known as the "Jewish Olympics", held in Tel Aviv during the first week of April.

Kaplan was expected to arrive in Mandatory Palestine on April 3, one day after the starting ceremony but in time to participate in the boxing and wrestling competitions. Unfortunately, Kaplan's ship was delayed off the English coast due to weather and he only arrived in Tel Aviv one day after completion of the games.

=== Professional career ===
Upon his return from the Middle East, Kaplan announced that he planned to play professional football for Tim Mara and the New York Giants for 1935. With training camp due to start on September 2, Kaplan continued to train as a boxer at the Olympic Gym in Philadelphia, signed to the stable of manager Joe Jacobs, who also handled Max Schmeling. As a two-time collegiate champion, now fighting at 189 pounds, Kaplan was touted as "The Jewish Jack Dempsey" and seen by some as a potential future contender for the heavyweight boxing crown. Plans were made for a professional boxing debut in the winter of 1935-36, following the conclusion of football season.

Kaplan signed his contract with the Giants in August 1935 and reported to the team's training camp in upstate New York on Labor Day. Kaplan was able to make the team, and played with the Giants in 1935 and 1936.

In 1942, Kaplan came out of retirement to play with his hometown Philadelphia Eagles, who were struggling with roster depth as numerous players entered military service.

Due to his successful boxing background — and noteworthy consumption of food at the training table — Kaplan quickly earned the nickname "Champ" from his Giants teammates.
