= France–Togo relations =

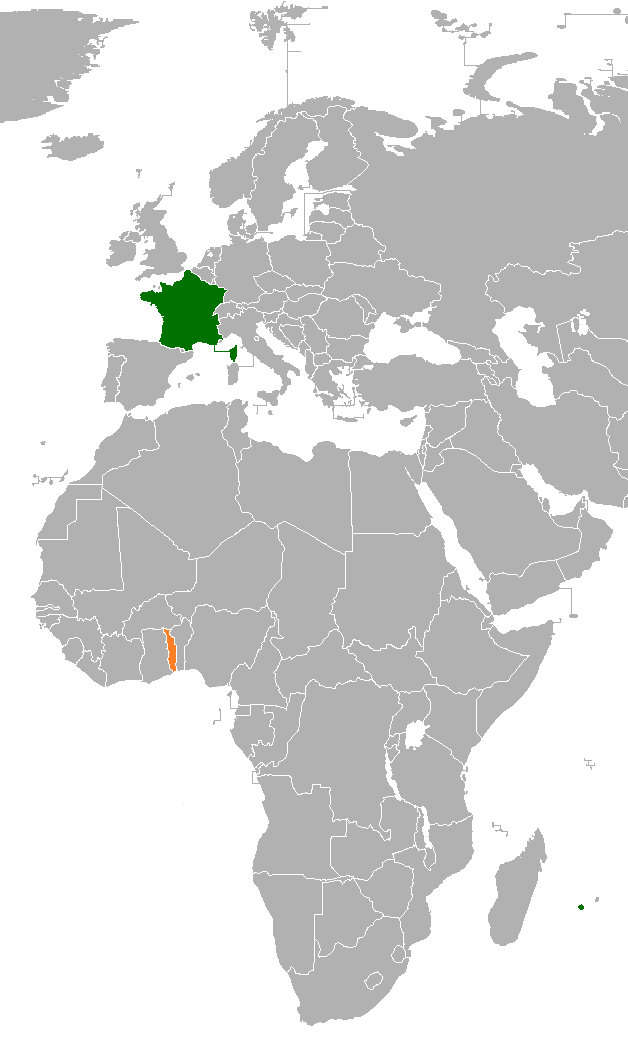
- France: Togo

France–Togo relations are the diplomatic relations between the French Republic and the Togolese Republic. Both nations are members of the Organisation internationale de la Francophonie and the United Nations.

== History ==
=== French colonization ===
During World War I, French and British troops invaded the German colony of Togoland as part of the Togoland campaign. As part of a League of Nations mandate, the British and French partitioned Togoland among themselves and France acquired the eastern-part of the territory which makes-up present-day Togo. In 1955, French Togoland became an autonomous republic within the French Union.

=== Independence ===
In May 1956, British Togoland held a plebiscite and a majority of residents voted to integrate their territory into soon-to-be-independent Ghana.

In 1958, Sylvanus Olympio became Prime Minister of Togo and led the nation towards its independence. In October 1958 the French government announced that full independence would be granted. On 27 April 1960, Togo became an independent nation and France and Togo soon established diplomatic relations. Olympio became the first President of Togo.

=== Since independence ===
Immediately after obtaining independence, Togo came under the French sphere of influence known as Françafrique. In January 1963, Olympio was assassinated in a coup d'état. That same year, France and Togo signed a mutual defense agreement. Under the pact French military intervention is authorized in the event of aggression from another country. In November 1963, Togolese President Nicolas Grunitzky paid a state visit to France and met with President Charles de Gaulle.

In September 1986, Togolese President Gnassingbé Eyadéma appealed for help from the French government due to an impending coup d'état when some 50 armed men tried to take over his government. France sent 150 French paratroopers which were flown in from a French military base in Bangui, Central African Republic. A French minesweeper and four jet fighters were also sent to Togo. Togo had charged that the raiders came from neighboring Ghana. President Gnassingbé Eyadéma remained in power until February 2005.

In 1993, France, along with Germany and the United States suspended aid to press for democratic reforms in Togo. In July 1999, French President Jacques Chirac paid a visit to Togo. During his visit, he met with President Eyadéma and promoted trade, development and democracy in the country. In May 2005, Faure Gnassingbé succeeded his father as President of Togo.

In October 2016, French Prime Minister Manuel Valls paid a visit to Togo to support democratic change and strengthen trade ties between both nations. In April 2021, Togolese President Faure Gnassingbé paid a visit to France and met with President Emmanuel Macron.

== Transportation ==
There are direct flights between Lomé and Paris with Air France.

== Trade ==
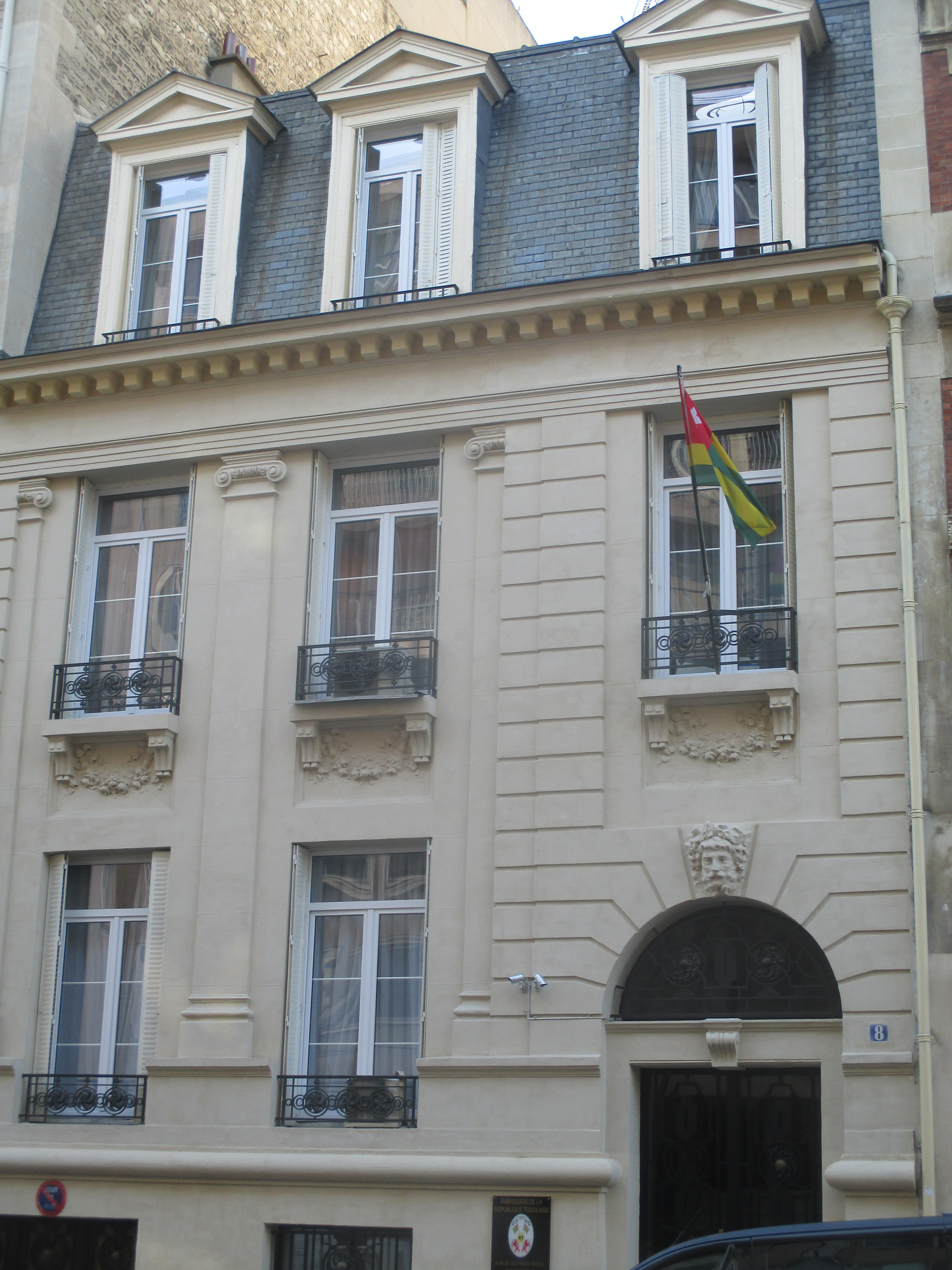
Embassy of Togo in Paris

In 2017, trade between France and Togo totaled €305 million Euros. France's main exports to Togo include: food and drink, medicine, fertilizers, perfumes, vehicles and hi-tech products. Togo's main exports to France include: refined petroleum, engine parts and soybeans.

French multi-national companies such as Bolloré, Électricité de France and TotalEnergies operate in Togo. French subsidiaries in Togo employ over 2,200 people.

== Resident diplomatic missions ==
- France has an embassy in Lomé.
- Togo has an embassy in Paris.

== See also ==
- Françafrique
- French West Africa
- Togolese people in France
