= Lobo Nocho =

American jazz musician and painter

- Born: Ernest Leroy Nocho; January 14, 1919; Philadelphia, Pennsylvania, U.S.
- Died: September 4, 1997 (aged 78); New York City, New York, U.S.
- Occupations: Jazz singer and painter

Ernest Leroy Nocho (January 14, 1919 – September 4, 1997), better known by his stage name Lobo Nocho, was an emigré jazz singer and painter in Europe. A former United States citizen, he settled in Europe after serving in World War II, and renounced his citizenship in 1950 to become a French citizen. He was later widely noted for his romantic links to Winston Churchill's daughter Sarah Churchill.

== Early life ==
Nocho was born in Philadelphia in 1919. He was one of six children of African Americans Samuel Nocho and Mary Jackson. He spent his youth in the city, graduating from Simon Gratz High School. His teachers at Gratz High remembered him as an outstanding art student whose paintings won municipal awards and were exhibited in major department stores such as Wanamaker's and Gimbels.

However, Nocho disliked life in Philadelphia, particularly due to issues of race relations; as his elder brother Edward Nocho put it, "he just couldn't adjust to Philadelphia life anymore and once told me that everyone who looked at him on the street regarded him not as a painter, not even as a human being, but as a black man." Some time after graduating high school, he moved to Quebec and enlisted in the Canadian Army there. This allowed him to put his artistic talents to practical use as a draughtsman, preparing blueprints for military architecture. In Canada, he also began courting Phyllis La France, a black Canadian woman living in Montreal, whom he had met earlier when she was in Trenton, New Jersey, visiting her aunt. The two were married at the Union Congregational Church by Reverend Charles H. Este on December 27, 1941.

== Career in Europe ==
After serving in the Canadian Army for some time, Nocho transferred to the United States Army just in time to see service during the 1944 Normandy landings. He eventually attained the rank of Technical Sergeant. His wife, who had remained behind in Montreal, obtained United States permanent residence through her marriage to him, and moved to New York, settling in Harlem. However, the two remained separated and fell out of contact. Nocho chose to settle in Europe after World War II ended, and in 1950 renounced his U.S. citizenship to become a French citizen.

Nocho enjoyed various professional successes in Europe, working as a jazz singer for Paris, Malta, and Rome nightclubs to earn a living while also continuing to paint, making him one of a number of African Americans in France pursuing careers in the arts in those years. By a year after the war ended he had found a regular gig at Schubert's club in Montparnasse, singing in both English and French. In 1952 he appeared at Jean's Intrigue in Paris, performing alongside fellow African-American émigré Aaron Bridgers. In September 1962, a Paris court found him guilty of smoking marijuana, and fined him NF500.

In 1971, Nocho visited New York City to watch Hazel Scott play piano in a fashion show, in which singer Freda Payne also appeared, and reminisced with them about African Americans in the Paris music scene in the 1950s. David Amram would later praise him as "one of the finest jazz singers I had heard in Paris", also noting his skills on the drums and in dance and his encyclopedic knowledge of jazz music. A book of Nocho's poetry was published by Vantage Press at the beginning of September 1997. He died just days later and was buried at the Calverton National Cemetery in Suffolk County, New York.

== Relationship with Sarah Churchill ==
In mid-1964, Nocho became acquainted with British actress Sarah Churchill, the daughter of former Prime Minister Winston Churchill, and by early 1965 the two had struck up a romance, a fact which became widely noted in world news reports after he was photographed escorting her back to London when her father was on his deathbed. Nocho moved into a Rome, Italy villa which she rented for him, and there were reports in Italian newspapers that the two would marry, though Nocho refused to answer media enquiries to this end. The two were still together in July 1966, when Churchill organised a London exhibition of Nocho's paintings at the home of Edwina Dixon, the daughter-in-law of British ambassador to France Pierson Dixon. Nocho gave a number of his paintings to Churchill's friend Pete Ballard, which the latter donated to North Carolina Central University in 2013.

However, in the end Churchill and Nocho never married. In her 1981 autobiography, she described him as a "vision in Levis, a jet-age troubadour and a one-man debating society". She hinted in her published poetry that her late father had strongly disapproved of her relationship with Nocho, writing:

Forgive me if I do not cry
The day you die
The simplest reason that I know
You said you'd rather have it so

And:

This is what I have chosen
This moment bitter and free
This is what I have chosen
From so much that was offered to me
Life showered her costliest gifts
And a safe passage home, if need be
But this is what I have chosen
This moment so bitter ... and so free.
