= Gabonese people in France =

Gabonese French
Total population
- 25.000

Regions with significant populations
- Paris

Languages
- Fang, French

Religion
- Christianity, Atheism

Related ethnic groups
- Black people in France, Afro-French

Gabonese people in France consist of migrants from Gabon and their descendants living and working in France.

== History ==
The first Gabonese immigrants in France came in the 1970s, like the other immigrants from Central Africa, some years after the first immigrant wave from Black Africa (Senegal Valley) in France. There are more immigrants in France from countries which neighbors Gabon such as DR Congo (former Zaire), Congo and Cameroon.

== See also ==
- France–Gabon relations
