= Ghanaians in France =

Ghanaian French
Total population
- 6,400

Regions with significant populations
- Île-de-France, Alsace

Languages
- English, French, Akan, Ewe

Religion
- Christianity, Islam, Others

Related ethnic groups
- Ghanaians, Ivorians in France, Burkinabe people in France, Togolese people in France

Ghanaians in France consist of Ghanaians resident in France and their descendants living and working in France.

== History ==
Ghanaian immigrants in France are a very recent group of immigrants. Even if there were some Ghanaians before the 2000s, they were not very visible, embedded in the big community of Africans in France (who were mostly composed of francophone Africans). However, this community has become more and more numerous.

== Distribution ==
There are Ghanaians in the banlieues (suburbs) of Paris, but also in Alsace because it's a region close to Germany, a country with a strong Ghanaian community.

== Notable people ==
- Marcel Desailly, footballer
- André Ayew, footballer
- Jordan Ayew, footballer
