= Last of the Conquerors =

1948 novel by William Gardner Smith

- First edition
- Author: William Gardner Smith
- Language: English
- Genre: Novel
- Publisher: Farrar, Straus
- Publication date: 1948
- Publication place: United States

Last of the Conquerors is the 1948 debut novel by African-American journalist and editor William Gardner Smith.

The novel concerns the author's experience as an African-American GI serving in the racially segregated United States Army in US-occupied Germany after World War II. The protagonist, Hayes Dawkins, has an affair with Ilse, a white German woman. He and Ilse struggle against racist Army officers and policies to sustain a relationship that some white soldiers condemn (although there are also many friendly whites who help them).

Last of the Conquerors depicts post-Nazi Germany as more racially tolerant than the United States. While this depiction may or may not be accurate, Smith's novel is offering a critique of Marshall Plan rhetoric claiming that American society should be a model for the world, while African-Americans continued to suffer under the Jim Crow system at home and in the military (an inconsistency noticed by many other writers, American and German, at the time).
