= William Gardner Smith =

American journalist

- Born: February 6, 1927; Philadelphia, Pennsylvania, U.S.
- Died: November 5, 1974 (aged 47); Thiais, France
- Occupations: Novelist; journalist; essayist
- Writing career
- Genres: Fiction, non-fiction
- Notable works: Last of the Conquerors, The Stone Face

William Gardner Smith (February 6, 1927 – November 5, 1974) was an American journalist, novelist, and editor. Smith is linked to the black social protest novel tradition of the 1940s and the 1950s, a movement that became synonymous with writers such as Richard Wright, Ralph Ellison, Willard Motley, and Ann Petry. Smith's third book, South Street (1954), is considered to be one of the first black militant protest novels. His last published novel, The Stone Face (1963), in its account of the Paris massacre of 1961, "stand[s] as one of the few representations of the event available all the way up until the early 1990s".

Smith was born in Philadelphia, Pennsylvania, of African-American descent. After 1951, he maintained an expatriate status in France. However, due to his various journalistic and editorial assignments, he also lived for extended periods of time in Ghana, West Africa. In the final decade of his life, he traveled to the United States to visit family and friends and write about the racial and social upheaval that was occurring there.

Some of Smith's journalism and reportage from this period was published in various media outlets in France and Europe. Some of it was revised, re-adapted, and published in Return To Black America in 1970. Smith, who spoke fluent French, was a frequent contributor and guest on radio and television programs in France, where he was considered an expert on the political struggle, civil unrest, and racial tension in the United States during the late 1960s and early 1970s.

Smith was diagnosed with cancer in October 1973 and died just over a year later in Thiais, in the southern suburbs of Paris, France. He was cremated and his ashes were interred at the columbarium at Paris's Père Lachaise Cemetery.

== Life and work ==
Smith was born in Philadelphia, Pennsylvania, to Edith Smith. In 1934, his mother married Douglass Stanley Earle. According to the Dictionary of Literary Biography (DLB):

this marriage produced three children—two daughters, Phyllis and Sydney, and a son, Douglass. Smith, the eldest, delighted in the care of his half sisters and brother, although he disliked his stepfather [...] Living in the South Philadelphia ghetto during the 1940s, a recurring setting in his novels, Smith gained an acute sense of the pain of being black in America.

In Smith's senior year, his high-school principal helped him secure a part-time position with the Pittsburgh Courier. Smith graduated from Benjamin Franklin High School with honors in January 1944 at the age of 16, the second highest student in his class. After graduation Smith began working full-time as a reporter for the Pittsburgh Courier, but in January 1946 he was drafted into the Army. He was sent to Europe, where he was assigned as a clerk-typist in occupied Berlin, Germany. It was this experience that inspired his first novel, Last of the Conquerors, published in 1948 when Smith was only 21.

Discharged from active duty in 1948, Smith attended Temple University and continued working as a journalist with the Pittsburgh Courier. During this time he married his high-school sweetheart and had begun working on his second published novel, Anger at Innocence (1950). After a short stay at the Yaddo Foundation in Saratoga Springs, the recently married couple left the United States for France in late 1951. There they became part of a large African-American community of artists and writers living in Paris including, most prominently, Richard Wright, James Baldwin, and Chester Himes among others.

Smith and his wife believed that a move to Europe might help their troubled marriage, but that was not to be. Increased financial burdens, his wife's difficulty learning a foreign language, and their struggles as artists in the displaced milieu of a community far from family and home, led to the couple's divorce. Despite these serious financial and spiritual difficulties, Smith continued to write while leading a bohemian existence in the Latin Quarter.

In 1954, Smith's situation improved with the release of his third novel, South Street (inspired by his childhood in the black neighborhoods and ghettoes of Philadelphia), and his hiring by the Agence France-Presse (AFP). In the following years, he served as a foreign service editor and correspondent. He also was a director of AFP in Ghana until the fall of Nkrumah in 1966, after which Smith continued as an editor and special correspondent of AFP in various countries.

His next book The Stone Face, published in 1963, would be his last published novel. Smith had begun work on it in 1961 when the war in Algeria proved to be an explosive situation that had exacerbated passions in France. This novel evokes the anti-Arab racism that Smith was witness to both in his daily journalistic work and in the streets of Paris. Kristin Ross, in her book May '68 And Its Afterlives, points out that The Stone Face is one of the earliest published eyewitness accounts (albeit in a fictionalized format) of the Paris massacre of 1961.

Smith's status as a foreigner and expatriate marked him as an insider and outsider in two cultures, the United States and Europe. By the early 1960s, as a black American working in a foreign land and witness to injustice on two continents, the stakes were raised for Smith in the composition of this novel. It pushed his capacities as an artist, writer, and journalist to their limits. In this novel and his subsequent journalistic writing and reportage, Smith testified to the social, political, and cultural happenings of his adopted country as a way to explore and address everyday racism in the United States. In France, Smith was considered an expert on the racial situation in the United States, especially after he published a report in 1967 on the revolts within American black ghettos.

Smith remarried on October 31, 1961, to Solange Royez. Their daughter, Michelle, was born in 1963, and a son was born in Accra, Ghana, in 1965. Their marriage ended in divorce in 1969. In 1971, Smith married Ira Reuben, a native of India. Their daughter Rachel was born in 1971.

== Selected bibliography ==
Major works

- Last of the Conquerors (New York: Farrar, Straus, 1948; London: Gollancz, 1949).
- Anger at Innocence (New York: Farrar, Straus, 1950; London: Gollancz, 1951) – Malheur aux justes, Club Français du Livre, 1952, 293 pages, translated by Jean Rosenthal.
- South Street (New York: Farrar, Straus and Young, 1954).
- The Stone Face (New York: Farrar, Straus, 1963); new edition, with an introduction by Adam Shatz, published by New York Review Books Classics, 2021, ISBN 978-1-68137-516-8
- Return to Black America (Englewood Cliffs, N. J.: Prentice-Hall, 1970) – L'Amérique noire, Paris: Casterman, 1972, translated by Rosine Fitzgerald.

Periodical publications

- "The Negro Writer: Pitfalls and Compensations," Phylon, 11 (Fourth Quarter 1950): 297–303.
- "European Backdrop," Pittsburgh Courier, January 5, 1952, p. 3.
- "Black Boy in France," Ebony, vol. VIII, no. 9 (July 1953), pp. 32–36, 39–42. – Article deals with life of Richard Wright in Paris over a span of seven years.
- "The World's Most Famous Nude," Art and Photography, vol. VIII, no. 10–94 (April 1957), pp. 14–15, 43–45.
