= Human trafficking in France =

Human trafficking in France involves the trafficking of women, men, and children for the purposes of forced prostitution, forced labor, domestic servitude, and forced begging. Victims originate from regions including Eastern Europe, West Africa, Asia, the Caribbean, and Brazil. Women and children have been trafficked into commercial sexual exploitation, while men, particularly from North Africa, have been subjected to forced labor in sectors such as agriculture and construction. Romani and other unaccompanied minors have also been identified as being vulnerable to forced begging.

In the French overseas territory of French Guiana, women and children from Brazil have been subjected to forced labor and forced prostitution. Young women from Haiti, Suriname, and the Dominican Republic have also been identified in prostitution in the territory, with some considered vulnerable to trafficking. In 2009, French authorities investigated reports of trafficking linked to illegal gold mining sites in French Guiana, initiating 17 legal proceedings and arresting two suspected traffickers.

The Government of France has been assessed as fully complying with the minimum standards for the elimination of human trafficking. In 2017, the U.S. Department of State classified France as a Tier 1 country in its Trafficking in Persons Report. French authorities have continued to prosecute trafficking offenses, train prosecutors and judges in the application of anti-trafficking legislation, and expand partnerships with non-governmental organizations. In 2009, the government reported identifying a significant number of trafficking victims and stated that all identified victims were referred for care and assistance, although it did not maintain comprehensive official data on victim referrals.

== Prosecution ==
French police and gendarmerie recorded 2,027 victims of trafficking and exploitation offences in 2022, representing a 12% increase compared with 2021.

France prohibits human trafficking for the purpose of sexual exploitation under Article 225 of its Penal Code, which prescribes penalties considered sufficiently stringent and comparable to those for rape. In January 2009, the government amended its anti-trafficking legislation to introduce a specific legal definition of forced labor. It has adopted successive national action plans against human trafficking and criminalizes trafficking under its penal code, while coordinating anti-trafficking policy through the Interministerial Mission for the Protection of Women against Violence and the Fight against Human Trafficking (MIPROF).

In 2008, the government reported the conviction of 19 trafficking offenders under its anti-trafficking statute, compared with 33 convictions in 2007. The maximum sentence imposed was seven years' imprisonment, although the government did not report the average sentence. Authorities also reported the conviction of 26 offenders for the forced prostitution of children, with sentences of up to seven years' imprisonment.

French authorities continued to rely primarily on anti-pimping provisions of the Penal Code to prosecute sex trafficking offenses. In 2008, the government reported 523 prosecutions under these provisions, approximately 16 percent of which originated from trafficking-specific arrests. In 2009, French authorities dismantled 40 trafficking networks within the country and cooperated with international partners to dismantle 14 transnational trafficking networks through joint cross-border investigations. Protection

The French government continued to work with non-governmental organizations (NGOs) to provide trafficking victims with shelter, social services, and other forms of assistance. While it provided indirect financial support for victim services, the government did not report total funding allocated to NGOs. Several NGOs reported receiving government funding, supplemented by private donations or pro bono medical and social services to support victims of trafficking and forced labor.

In 2009, French authorities reported identifying and referring 799 trafficking victims to NGOs for assistance, although the government did not maintain official data on the number of victims who ultimately received shelter or support services. The Committee Against Modern Slavery (CCEM) reported 216 cases of forced labour in France in 2008, of which 120 victims were placed in protective custody.

The government provided witness protection services, temporary residence permits for victims who cooperated with criminal investigations, and a 30-day reflection period to allow victims to decide whether to assist law enforcement. Permanent residence permits could be granted following the successful conviction of a trafficker. The government also assisted victims wishing to return to their countries of origin, although fewer than five percent reportedly chose to do so.

According to a 2009 report by Human Rights Watch, France lacked systematic procedures for proactively identifying trafficking victims at its borders. The report also stated that some individuals engaged in prostitution were arrested for solicitation without first being screened for indicators of trafficking. In response to such concerns, the government continued mandatory anti-trafficking training for law enforcement personnel to improve victim identification.

=== Romani ===
The French government expanded cooperation with the Romanian government to improve the protection, return, and reintegration of unaccompanied Romani minors considered vulnerable to trafficking.

A 2009 report by Human Rights Watch criticized the treatment of unaccompanied minors arriving at Roissy Charles de Gaulle Airport. The report alleged that children, including potential trafficking victims, were detained in the airport's transit zone and treated as irregular migrants without adequate screening for signs of trafficking. Human Rights Watch documented cases involving children from Nigeria and Guinea who were allegedly not identified as trafficking victims, including one case in which a suspected trafficker was able to visit the victim while she was in detention. The report also noted that the French Red Cross had repeatedly urged authorities to strengthen procedures for identifying and protecting child trafficking victims at the airport.

== Prevention ==
The Government of France sustained strong prevention efforts in 2009 and led European efforts to prevent human trafficking on the Internet. Its multi-disciplinary group met throughout 2009 to improve national coordination and ensure a victim-centered approach. The government launched a national campaign in 2010 combating violence against women in all forms; the campaign highlighted trafficking in persons as part of this broader campaign. In January 2010, the government sponsored a nationwide conference that brought together law enforcement, magistrates, and NGOs to improve partnerships in order to better protect victims and prevent trafficking. The government, in partnership with the hotel industry, provided training for managers and employees of major hotel groups on identification techniques for potential victims of trafficking and how to report potential trafficking. As a law enforcement activity that could serve to prevent human trafficking, the government reported convicting 149 offenders for "crimes related to modern day slavery," including 117 convictions for "subjecting vulnerable individuals to indecent accommodations and working conditions" and 32 convictions for "withholding wages of vulnerable individuals." In October 2009, the government announced the creation of a public-private partnership to address child sports trafficking and committed $2.74 million towards the initiative. In 2009, ECPAT France launched a progressive public awareness campaign in cooperation with Air France, over which the government exercises considerable influence, to target French child sex tourists; the campaign stressed the legal consequences of such sexual exploitation crimes committed abroad and the government's commitment to prosecute these crimes in French courts, imposing strong prison sentences for convicted offenders. The government did not conduct or fund any demand-reduction awareness campaigns aimed at raising awareness among potential clients of victims in France. The government provided all French military and law enforcement personnel with general training on trafficking during their basic training. There was also a three-week general training given to French military personnel before their deployment abroad for international peacekeeping missions.

In March 2009, the government convicted two French nationals for aggravated sex tourism offenses they committed in Southeast Asia; both received the maximum sentences of seven years. In September 2009, French Police dismantled a makeshift camp for undocumented migrants near the port of Calais, known colloquially as "the jungle," and rounded up almost 300 Afghans, Pakistanis, and others who had hoped to cross the English Channel into Great Britain. Although media reports indicated that French officials hailed the demolition as a prevention measure for trafficking, it is unclear whether the action was explicitly intended to be an anti-trafficking measure. Local observers and international experts criticized the government's response, citing it increased these migrants' vulnerability to trafficking.

== See also ==
- Human trafficking
- Human rights in France
