= Simon Gratz High School Mastery Charter =

- Simon Gratz High School
- U.S. National Register of Historic Places
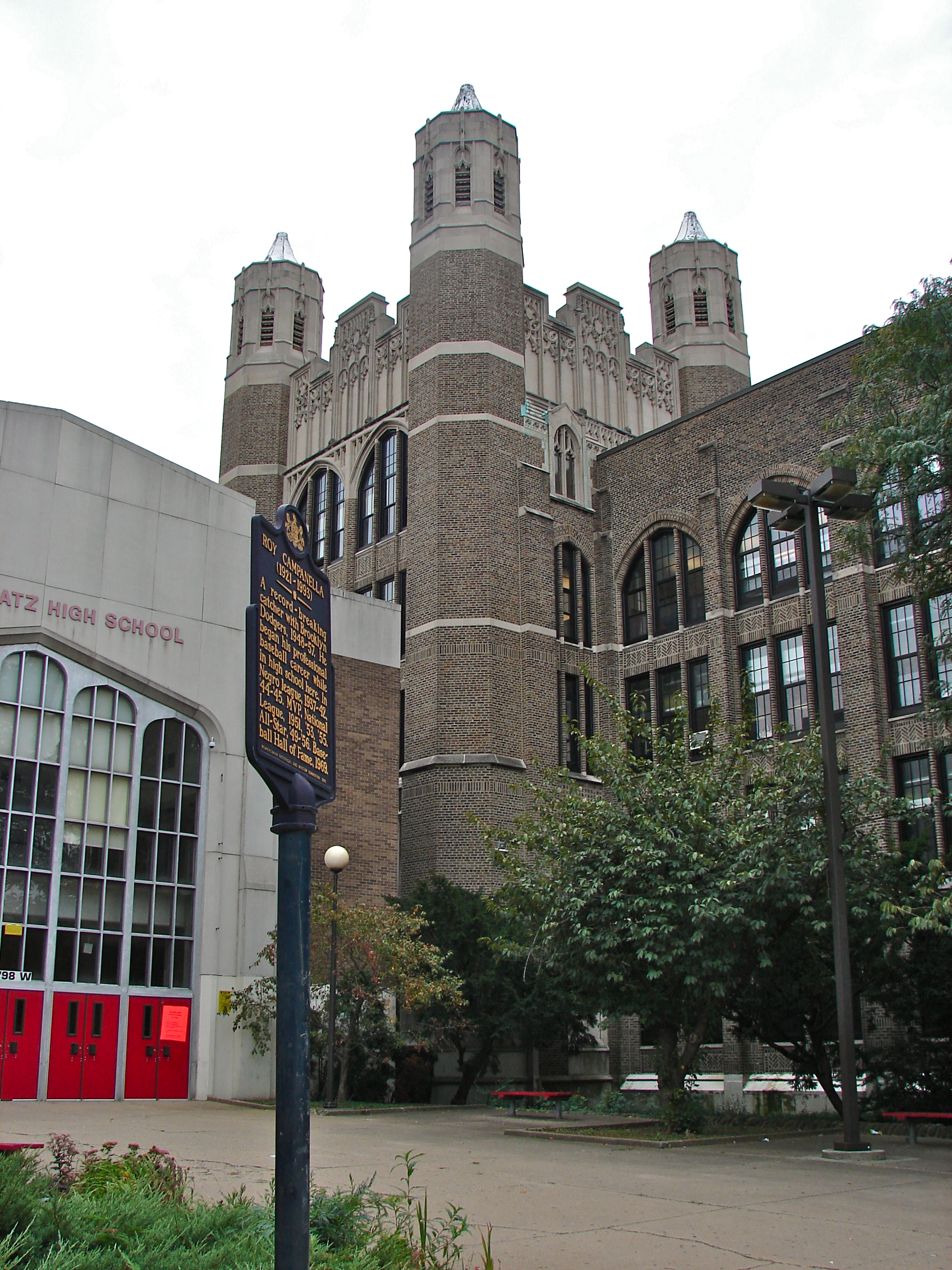

- Location within Philadelphia Location within Pennsylvania Location within the United States
- Location: 3901–3961 N. 18th St., Philadelphia, Pennsylvania
- Coordinates: 40°0′47.39″N 75°9′23.97″W
- Area: 2.6 acres (1.1 ha)
- Built: 1925
- Architect: Irwin T. Catharine
- Architectural style: Late Gothic Revival
- MPS: Philadelphia Public Schools TR
- NRHP reference No.: 88002276
- Added to NRHP: April 10, 1989

Simon Gratz High School Mastery Charter, formerly Simon Gratz High School is a secondary school in Philadelphia. Its name honors Simon Gratz (1840-1925), a member of the Philadelphia Board of Education. Originally a public high school operated by the School District of Philadelphia, Gratz has been operated as a charter school by Mastery Schools since September 2011. Students from the previous public school's enrollment area are eligible to attend. It is the fifth Philadelphia high school operated by Mastery.

In 2012, the school was removed from the Persistently Dangerous Schools List while under the new management of Mastery. Part of the building is used for Mastery’s Prep Middle School (7-8th grade).

== School uniforms ==
Gratz students are required to wear school uniforms consisting of red Simon Gratz uniform shirts, black pants or black shirt, and any color shoes.

== Notable alumni ==
- Bennie Briscoe, boxer
- Neef Buck, rapper
- Roy Campanella, MLB player
- Zack Clayton, member of Basketball Hall of Fame
- Roderick Coleman, NFL player
- Mardy Collins, NBA player
- Eddie Fisher, singer
- David Goodis writer
- William H. Gray III, U.S. Congressman and CEO, United Negro College Fund
- Grayson Hall, television, film and stage actress
- Bernie Kaplan (1913–1992), boxer and NFL player
- Leroy Kelly, NFL player
- Pat Kelly (outfielder), MLB player
- Willie Mae James Leake, Mayor of Chester, Pennsylvania
- Joan Little, activist
- Aaron McKie, NBA player and coach
- Nathan Milstein, virtuoso violinist
- Alvin Mitchell, American football player
- Lobo Nocho, émigré jazz singer and painter in Europe
- Marvin O'Connor, professional basketball player
- Aaron Owens, streetball player
- Harvey Pollack, NBA statistician
- Ivan Robinson, professional boxer
- Artie Singer, songwriter, music producer and bandleader
- Irving Stern, philosopher and thinker
- Lynard Stewart, professional basketball player
- Meldrick Taylor, 1984 Olympic gold medalist amateur boxer, Professional boxer
- Rasheed Wallace, NBA player
- Earl Watford, NFL player
- Young Chris, rapper
- Jerry Yulsman, novelist and photographer
