= Democratic Republic of the Congo–France relations =

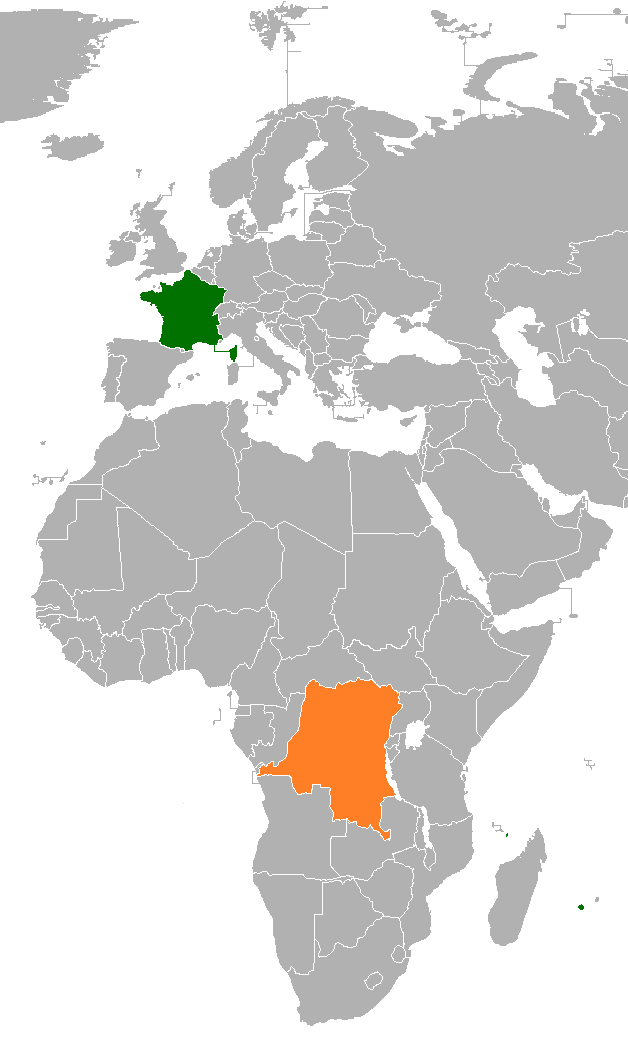
- France: DR Congo

Democratic Republic of the Congo–France relations are the bilateral diplomatic relations between the Democratic Republic of the Congo and France. Both nations are members of the Organisation internationale de la francophonie and the United Nations.

The Democratic Republic of the Congo and France maintain historical, political, and economic relations, with France playing an important role in peacekeeping and development cooperation in the Democratic Republic of the Congo. As members of the Francophone community, the two countries also continue to cooperate in the fields of culture and education.

== History ==
In 1961, France sent colonel Roger Trinquier to support the coup d'etat of Mobutu Sese Seko.

Shortly after the Katangan secession was successfully crushed, Zaire (then called the Republic of the Congo) signed a treaty of technical and cultural cooperation with France. During the presidency of Charles de Gaulle, diplomatic relations between the two countries gradually grew stronger and closer due to their many shared geopolitical interests.

Valéry Giscard d'Estaing decided to send the French Army to Zaïre in 1977 to help Mobutu, whose régime threatened to crumble before rebels of the Congolese National Liberation Front in the Shaba I war. France intervened again the following year in the Shaba II war.

In the 1994 Rwandan genocide, Mobutu Sese Seko authorized France to use the Kivu region as a base for Operation Turquoise, a French military operation to put an end to the massacres in Rwanda.

On January 28, 2025, demonstrators in Kinshasa, the capital of the Democratic Republic of Congo (DRC), attacked several foreign embassies, including those of France, Belgium, Kenya, Rwanda, Uganda, and the United States. These protests were in response to the escalating conflict in the DRC's eastern regions, which has led to the displacement of hundreds of thousands of people. French Foreign Minister Jean-Noel Barrot condemned the attacks, stating that they were "unacceptable" and assured that measures were being taken to ensure the safety of French personnel and citizens.

== Contemporary period ==
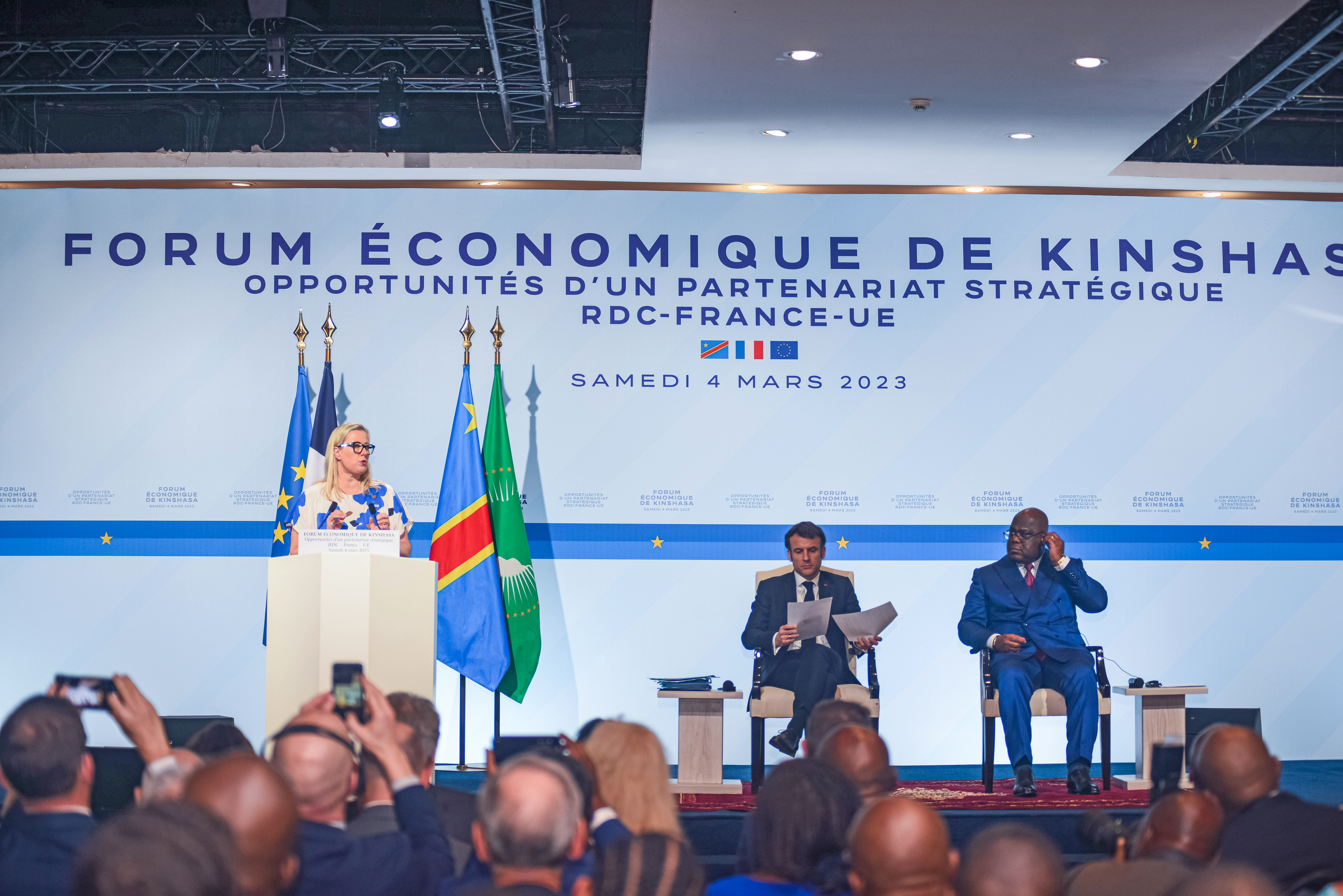
DR Congo's President Félix Tshisekedi, French President Emmanuel Macron and European Commissioner Jutta Urpilainen in Kinshasa, 4 March 2023

=== Culture ===
French is the official language of the DRC, and both France and the DRC are full members of the Organisation internationale de la francophonie (International Organization of French Speakers).

Several Alliances françaises and Instituts français operate in the RDC (notably the Institut français in Kinshasa), as well as the lycée Français René Descartes de Kinshasa. France has also trained certain Congolese administrators at the École Nationale d'Administration.

=== Politics ===
France committed at the end of President Kabila's second to the European Union and the United Nations Security Council that it would enforce human rights, democracy and the Congolese constitution.

France provides Congo-DRC with food and medical assistance. French food aid has increased since the food crisis of 2008, reaching 17 million euros between 2008 and 2012.

== Economic relations ==
France primarily imports food and agricultural products from the DRC, whose primary imports from France are pharmaceuticals and mechanical equipment.

The DRC receives support from French experts to help it improve its budgetary and administrative performance, in accordance with the debt reduction and development contract (C2D) between the two countries.

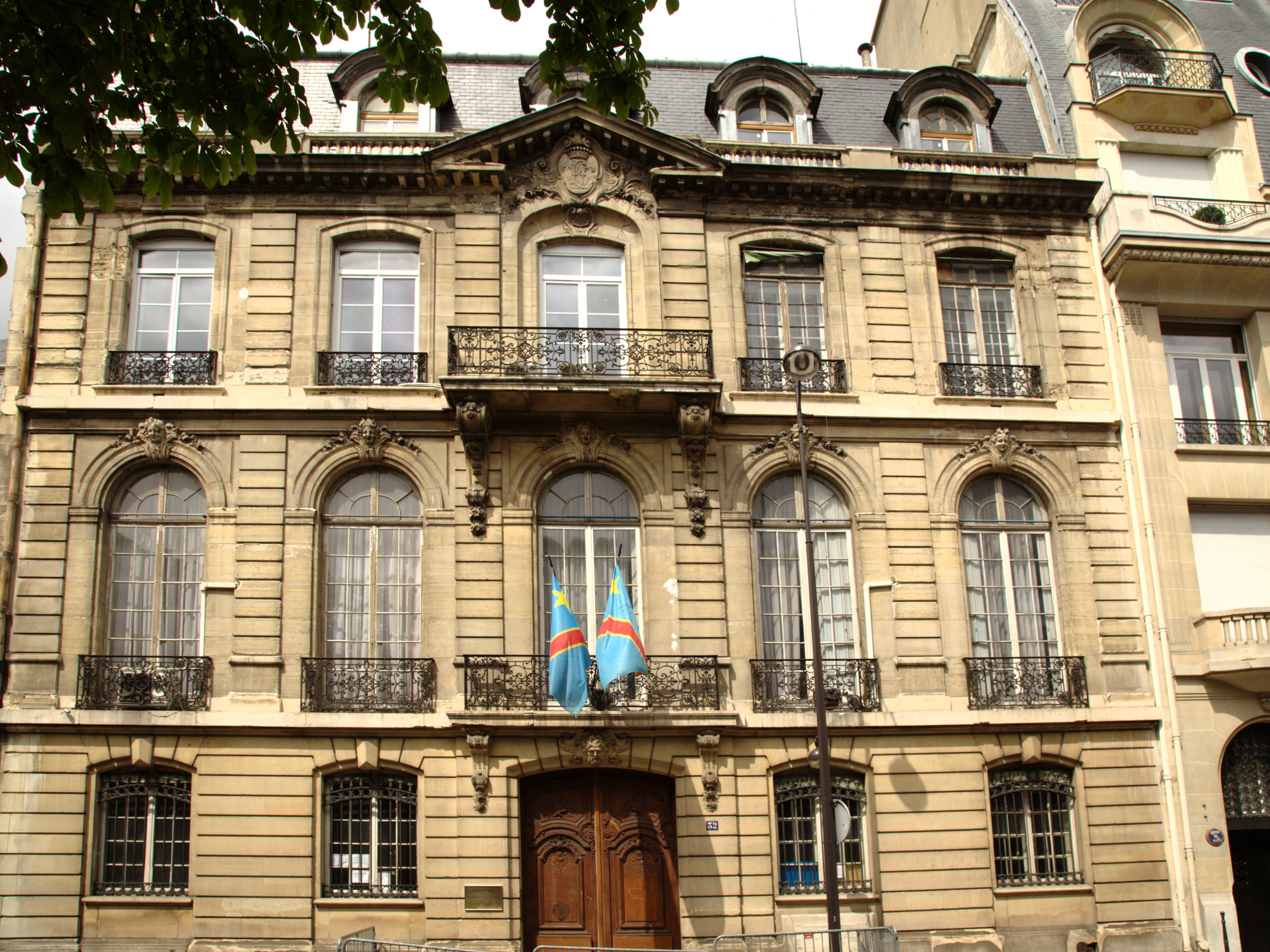
Embassy of the DR Congo in Paris

== Resident diplomatic missions ==
- DR Congo has an embassy in Paris.
- France has an embassy in Kinshasa.

== See also ==
- Foreign relations of Democratic Republic of the Congo
- Foreign relations of France
- Belgium–Democratic Republic of the Congo relations
