= Beninese people in France =

Total population
- 20,000

Regions with significant populations
- París, Marseille

Languages
- French, Fon, Yoruba

Religion
- Christianity, Islam, Voodoo

Related ethnic groups
- Black people in France, Afro-French, Togolese people in France

Beninese people in France consist of migrants from Benin and their descendants living and working in France.

== History ==
The first Beninese immigrants in France arrived in the 1970s and the 1980s. They came mostly from urban areas. Today, the population has become more and more numerous, but a little less than those from the neighboring nation of Togo.
