= Togolese people in France =

Total population
- 26,000

Regions with significant populations
- Île-de-France

Languages
- French, Ewe, Kabiyé

Religion
- Christianity, Sunni Islam

Related ethnic groups
- Black people in France, Afro-French, Ghanaians in France, Burkinabe people in France, Beninese people in France

Togolese people in France consist of migrants from Togo and their descendants living and working in France. They are one of the Sub-Saharan African diasporas in France.

== History ==
The first Togolese immigrants in France arrived in the 1970s and the 1980s. They come mostly to live in poor suburban areas (banlieue).

== See also ==
- France–Togo relations
- Togolese people in Italy
- Togolese Canadians
- Togolese Americans
- Togolese people in the United Kingdom
- Togolese people in Belgium
- Togolese people in the Netherlands
- Togolese people in Germany
- Togolese people in Switzerland
- Togolese Australians
