= Immigration to Île-de-France =

Overview article

2019 Census Paris Region (Île-de-France)
Country/territory of birth	Population
Metropolitan France	9,215,134
Algeria	330,935
Morocco	253,518
Portugal	234,399
Tunisia	127,827
Guadeloupe	81,269
Martinique	75,959
China	71,500
Turkey	67,982
Mali	66,085
(Ivory Coast) Côte d'Ivoire	63,810
Senegal	60,124
Italy	58,141
Romania	53,848
(Democratic Republic of the Congo) Democratic Republic of Congo	52,449
Spain	45,828
Sri Lanka	45,786
Cameroon	45,370
Republic of the Congo	38,651
Haiti	36,685
Poland	35,871
Vietnam	35,251
Cambodia	30,321
Réunion	30,077
India	29,623
Serbia	25,632
Lebanon	21,066
Madagascar	21,002
Germany	20,523
Pakistan	20,178
Russia	19,019
Mauritius	18,840
Guinea	18,709
Brazil	17,887
United Kingdom	17,789
United States	17,583
(United Nations) Other countries and territories	857,720

The Île-de-France is a magnet for immigrants, hosting one of the largest concentrations of immigrants in Europe. As of 2006, about 35% of people (4 million) living in the region were either immigrant (17%) or born to at least one immigrant parent (18%). In 2020-2021, about 5 million people, or 41% of the population of Île-de-France, are either immigrants (21%) or have at least one immigrant parent (20%), these figures do not include French people born in Overseas France and their direct descendants.

If the region, primary seat of French political and economic power for centuries, has always attracted immigrants, modern immigration can be traced back to the second half of the 19th century when France emerged as an immigration destination with Eastern European Jews fleeing persecutions, and Southern Europeans (mostly Italians) and Belgians seeking better economic conditions. During the first half of the 20th century, immigrants were mostly Europeans, but after decolonisation, and during the French post-war economic boom, many immigrants came from former French colonies (chiefly the Maghreb and West Africa). At the 2010 census, 23.0% of the total population in the Île-de-France region were born outside of Metropolitan France, up from 19.7% at the 1999 census.

Among these people born outside Metropolitan France, 1,611,989 were immigrants (see definition below the table), making up 14.7% of the region's total population. INSEE estimated that on 1 January 2005, the number of immigrants in the region had reached 1,916,000, making up 16.7% of its total population. This is an increase of 304,000 immigrants in slightly less than six years.

According to a study in 2009, nearly 56% of all newborns in the region in 2007 had at least one parent originated from sub-Saharan Africa, Turkey, Maghreb or Overseas departments and territories of France.

== People under 18 of foreign origin ==
In 2005, 37% of young people under 18 had at least one immigrant parent in Île-de-France, including a quarter of African origin (Maghreb and sub-Saharan Africa).

People under 18 of Maghrebi, sub-Saharan and Turkish origin became a majority in several cities of the region (Clichy-sous-Bois, Mantes-la-Jolie, Grigny, Saint-Denis, Les Mureaux, Saint-Ouen, Sarcelles, Pierrefitte-sur-Seine, Garges-lès-Gonesse, Aubervilliers, Stains, Gennevilliers and Épinay-sur-Seine). Young people of Maghrebi origin comprised about 12% of the population of the region, 22% of that of département of the Seine-Saint-Denis district, and 37% of the 18th arrondissement of Paris. In Grigny, 31% of young people are of sub-Saharan origin.

In the département of Seine-Saint-Denis (population 1.5 million), 57% of people under 18 have at least one immigrant parent, including 38% of African origin.

% people under 18 (2005)	Paris	Seine-Saint-Denis	Val-de-Marne	Val-d'Oise	France
All origins	41.3%	56.7%	39.9%	37.9%	18.1%
Maghreb	12.1%	22.0%	13.2%	13.0%	6.9%
Sub-Saharan Africa	9.9%	16.0%	10.8%	9.1%	3.0%
Turkey	0.6%	2.7%	1.2%	3.1%	1.4%
South Europe	4.0%	4.0%	5.5%	4.8%	2.6%

Place of birth of residents of Île-de-France (at the 1968, 1975, 1982, 1990, 1999, and 2010 censuses)
Census	Born in Île-de-France	Born in the rest of Metropolitan France	Born in Overseas France	Born in foreign countries with French citizenship at birth^{[a]}	Immigrants^{[b]}
2010	56.2%	20.8%	1.8%	3.5%	17.7%
2010	56.2%	20.8%	1.8%	3.5%	from Europe	from the Maghreb^{[c]}	from the rest of Africa	from the rest of the world
2010	56.2%	20.8%	1.8%	3.5%	4.9%	5.2%	3.5%	4.1%
1999	55.4%	24.9%	1.8%	3.2%	14.7%
1999	55.4%	24.9%	1.8%	3.2%	from Europe	from the Maghreb^{[c]}	from the rest of Africa	from the rest of the world
1999	55.4%	24.9%	1.8%	3.2%	5.1%	4.3%	2.2%	3.1%
1990	54.1%	26.3%	1.9%	3.7%	14.0%
1982	52.7%	28.4%	1.7%	3.9%	13.3%
1975	51.7%	31.2%	1.0%	3.9%	12.2%
1968	52.1%	33.2%	0.5%	4.0%	10.2%
^a Persons born abroad of one or two French parents, such as Pieds-Noirs, children of French expatriates, and children of dual-citizens.^b An immigrant is by French definition a person born in a foreign country and who didn't have French citizenship at birth. Note that an immigrant may have acquired French citizenship since moving to France, but is still listed as an immigrant in French statistics. On the other hand, persons born in France with foreign citizenship (the children of immigrants) are not listed as immigrants.^c Algeria, Morocco, Tunisia
Source: INSEE
