= Demographics of Paris =

Demographics within the Paris Region (according to the INSEE 2008 census)

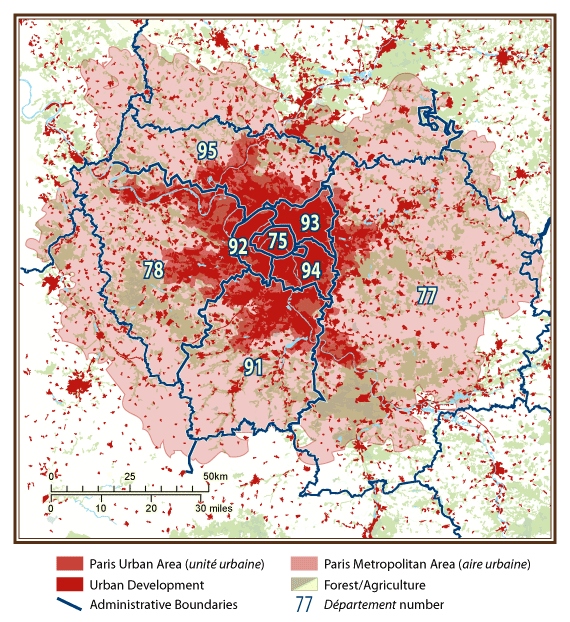

Note that the map above is outdated. It shows the extent of the urban and metropolitan areas of Paris at the 1999 census.
Île-de-France departments
Areas
Population
2008 census
Area

Density

1999-2008
pop. growth
City of Paris
(department 75)
2,211,297
105 km^{2} (41 sq mi)
20,169/km^{2} (52,240/sq mi)
+0.45%/year
Inner ring
(Petite couronne)
(Depts. 92, 93, 94)
4,366,961
657 km^{2} (254 sq mi)
6,647/km^{2} (17,220/sq mi)
+0.89%/year
Outer ring
(Grande couronne)
(Depts. 77, 78, 91, 95)
5,081,002
11,250 km^{2} (4,344 sq mi)
452/km^{2} (1,170/sq mi)
+0.68%/year
Île-de-France
(entire region)
11,659,260
12,012 km^{2} (4,638 sq mi)
971/km^{2} (2,510/sq mi)
+0.71%/year
Statistical Areas (INSEE 2008 census)
Areas
Population
2008 census
Area
Density

1999-2008
pop. growth
Urban area
(Paris agglomeration)
10,354,675
2,844.8 km^{2} (1,098 sq mi)
3,640/km^{2} (9,400/sq mi)
+0.70%/year
Metropolitan area
12,089,098
17,174.4 km^{2} (6,631 sq mi)
704/km^{2} (1,820/sq mi)
+0.71%/year

The city of Paris (also called the Commune or Department of Paris) had a population of 2,047,602 people within its administrative city limits as of 1 January 2026. It is surrounded by the Paris unité urbaine, or urban area, the most populous urban area in the European Union.

In 2023 the unité urbaine had a population of 11,013,774 in 2,824 km^{2} (1,090 sq mi). The Paris Region, or Île-de-France, covers 12,012 km^{2} (4,638 sq mi), and has its own regional council and president. It has a population of 12,463,067 as of January 2023, or 18.3 percent of the population of France. The metropolitan or functional area (aire d'attraction) of Paris covers 18,941 km^{2} (7,313 sq mi) and has 13,320,752 inhabitants (2023).

The population of the city of Paris reached a historic high of 2.9 million in 1921 but then declined; between 1954 and 1999 it declined at every census, falling to 2,125,246 in 1999. After that it began to climb again, reaching 2,240,621 in 2012, but falling to 2,103,778 in 2023.

The city's population loss reflected the experience of most other core cities in the developed world that have not expanded their boundaries. The principal factors in the process were a significant decline in household size, and a dramatic migration of residents to the suburbs between 1962 and 1975. Factors in the migration included deindustrialisation, high rent, the gentrification of many inner quarters, the transformation of living space into offices, and greater affluence among working families. The city's population loss was one of the most severe among international municipalities and the largest for any that had achieved more than 2,000,000 residents. Since then, an influx of younger residents and immigrants has contributed to the growth of the city.

== Density ==
Paris population pyramid in 2022

According to Eurostat, the EU statistical agency, in 2012 the Commune of Paris was the most densely populated city in the European Union, with 21,616 people per square kilometre within the city limits (the NUTS-3 statistical area), ahead of Inner London West, which had 10,374 persons per square kilometre. According to the same census, three departments bordering Paris, Hauts-de-Seine, Seine-Saint-Denis and Val-de-Marne, had population densities of over ten thousand persons per square kilometre, ranking among the ten most densely populated areas of the EU.

Paris is one of the most densely populated cities in the world. Its density, excluding the outlying woodland parks of Boulogne and Vincennes, was 24,448 inhabitants per square kilometre (63,320/sq mi) in the 1999 official census, which could be compared only with some Asian megapolises and the New York City borough of Manhattan. Even including the two woodland areas, its population density was 20,755/km^{2} (53,760/sq mi) in 2017, the sixth-most-densely populated commune in France after Levallois-Perret, Vincennes, Le Pré-Saint-Gervais, Saint-Mandé and Montrouge, all of which border the city proper.

The most sparsely populated quarters are the western and central office and administration-focused arrondissements. The city's population is densest in the northern and eastern arrondissements; the 11th arrondissement had a density of 40,672 inhabitants per square kilometre (105,340/sq mi) in 1999, and some of the same arrondissement's eastern quarters had densities close to 100,000/km^{2} (260,000/sq mi) in the same year.

Population density map of Paris in January 2017

Arrondissement	Area (km^{2})	Population	Population per km^{2}
1	1.826	17,268	9,457
2	0.992	22,558	22,740
3	1.171	36,727	31,364
4	1.601	28,068	17,532
5	2.541	61,080	24,038
6	2.154	44,154	20,499
7	4.088	58,166	14,228
8	3.881	39,409	10,154
9	2.179	60,293	27,670
10	2.892	95,436	33,000
11	3.666	156,831	42,780
12	6.377	146,527	22,977
13	7.146	184,235	25,782
14	5.621	142,535	25,358
15	8.502	240,723	28,314
16	7.846	170,239	21,698
17	5.669	171,945	30,331
18	6.005	202,780	33,769
19	6.786	187,799	27,674
20	5.984	199,113	33,274
Paris	105.400	2,265,886	21,498

inhabitants per km^{2}
9,000 – 12,000
12,000 – 15,000
15,000 – 18,000
18,000 – 21,000
21,000 – 24,000
24,000 – 27,000
27,000 – 30,000
30,000 – 33,000
33,000 – 36,000
36,000 – 39,000
39,000 – 42,000
42,000 – 45,000

Notes: Without the Bois de Boulogne and the Bois de Vincennes.
References: INSEE

== Paris agglomeration ==
Population density map of the Île-de-France region (2023 population data)

The city of Paris covers an area much smaller than the urban area of which it is the core. At present, Paris's real urbanisation, defined by the pôle urbain (urban cluster) statistical area, covers 2,845 km^{2} (1,098 sq mi), or an area about 27 times larger than the city itself. The administration of Paris's urban growth is divided between itself and its surrounding departments: Paris's closest ring of three adjoining departments, or petite couronne ("small ring") are fully saturated with urban growth, and the ring of four departments outside of these, the grande couronne departments, are only covered in their inner regions by Paris's urbanisation. These eight departments form the larger administrative Île-de-France région; most of this region is filled, and overextended in places, by the Paris functional area, which, in 2023, was populated by over 13 million people.

The Paris agglomeration has shown a steady rate of growth since the end of the late 16th century French Wars of Religion, save brief setbacks during the French Revolution and World War II. With 13.3 million inhabitants in 2023, the annual population growth rate of the Paris functional area was between 0.4% and 1.0% over the past 55 years.

== Immigration ==
2023 Paris Region (Île-de-France)
Country/territory of birth	Pop.
Metropolitan France	9,100,643
Algeria	364,869
Morocco	281,066
Portugal	214,430
Tunisia	151,900
(Ivory Coast) Côte d'Ivoire	83,671
Guadeloupe	79,711
Mali	77,876
China	76,529
Senegal	73,060
Martinique	72,470
Turkey	71,926
Italy	59,241
Cameroon	54,080
(Democratic Republic of the Congo) DR Congo	53,434
Romania	53,140
Sri Lanka	48,586
Republic of the Congo	47,877
Spain	43,509
Haiti	38,476
Vietnam	36,611
India	36,415
Poland	32,546
Lebanon	28,941
Cambodia	28,746
Réunion	28,095
Brazil	24,672
Guinea	24,360
Pakistan	23,554
Madagascar	23,417
Serbia	23,062
Russia	21,635
Germany	20,559
United States	19,663
Colombia	19,002
Mauritius	18,847
French Guiana	18,122
United Kingdom	17,890
Comoros	17,157
(United Nations) Other countries and territories	953,279

By law, French censuses do not ask questions regarding ethnicity or religion, but do gather information concerning one's country of birth. From this it is still possible to determine that Paris and its metropolitan area is one of the most multi-cultural in Europe: According to the 2011 census, 456,105 residents of the municipality of Paris, or 20.3 percent, and 2,117,901 residents of the Paris Region (Île-de-France), or 17.9 percent, were born outside France. At the 1999 census, 4.2% of the population in Paris metropolitan area were recent immigrants (people who had immigrated to France between 1990 and 1999), the majority from Asia and Africa. 37 % of all immigrants in France live in the Paris region.

The first wave of international migration to Paris started as early as 1820, with the arrivals of German peasants fleeing an agricultural crisis in their homeland. Several waves of immigration followed continually until today: Italians and central European Jews during the 19th century; Russians after the revolution of 1917 and Armenians fleeing genocide in the Ottoman Empire; colonial subjects during World War I and later; Poles between the two world wars; Spaniards, Italians, Portuguese, and North Africans from the 1950s to the 1970s; North African Jews after colonies in that region gained independence; Africans and Asians since then.

The Paris metropolitan region, or aire urbaine, is estimated to be home to some 1.7 million Muslims, who comprise between 10–15 per cent of the area's population. However, without official data, the margin of error of these estimates is extremely high as it is based on one's country of birth (someone born in a Muslim country or born to a parent from a Muslim country is considered as a "potential Muslim"). According to the North American Jewish Data Bank, an estimated 310,000 Jews also live in Paris and the surrounding Île-de-France region, an area with a population of 11.7 million. Paris has historically been a magnet for immigrants, and it hosts one of the largest concentrations of immigrants in Europe today.

=== Immigrants and their children in departments of Île-de-France (Paris Region) ===
According to the National Institute for Statistics and Economic Studies, responsible for the production and analysis of official statistics in France, 20 per cent of people living in the city of Paris are immigrants, and 41.3 per cent of people under 20 have at least one immigrant parent. Among the young people under 18, 12.1 per cent are of Maghrebi origin, 9.9 per cent of Subsaharan African origin, and 4.0 per cent of South European origin. In 2020–2021, about 6 million people, or 49% of the population of Paris, are either immigrants (21%) or have at least one immigrant parent (28%). These figures do not include French people born in Overseas France and their direct descendants.

Département	Immigrants			Children under 20 with at least one immigrant parent		
Département	Number	% department	% Île-de-France	Number	% department	% Île-de-France
Paris (75)	436,576	20	22.4	162,635	41.3	15.4
Seine-Saint-Denis (93)	394,831	26.5	20.2	234,837	57.1	22.2
Hauts-de-Seine (92)	250,190	16.3	12.8	124,501	34	11.8
Val-de-Marne (94)	234,633	18.1	12	127,701	40	12.1
Val-d'Oise (95)	185,890	16.1	9.5	124,644	38.5	11.8
Yvelines (78)	161,869	11.6	8.3	98,755	26.4	9.3
Essonne (91)	150,980	12.6	7.7	94,003	29.6	8.9
Seine-et-Marne (77)	135,654	10.7	7	90,319	26	8.5
Île-de-France	1,950,623	16.9	100	1,057,394	37.1	100

(source: Insee, EAR 2006) Reading: 436 576 immigrants live in Paris, representing 20% of Parisians and 22.4% of immigrants in Île-de-France. 162 635 children under 20 with at least one immigrant parent live in Paris, representing 41.3 per cent of the total of children under 20 in Paris, and 15.4 per cent of the total of children under 20 with at least one immigrant parent in Île-de-France.

== Expatriates ==
As of 2005 many expatriates settle in the western portion of Paris. Western Paris is in close proximity to many international schools and the La Défense area.

Many international students living in Paris live in the large dormitory complex of Cité Université Internationale de Paris, located just on the edge of the city in the 14th arrondissement.

== Ethnic groups ==
=== Africans ===
As of 2012 tens of thousands of people of African origins live in Paris. This group includes those born in France who had African parents and naturalized French citizens born in Africa. The majority come from the Maghreb, including Algeria, Morocco, and Tunisia. Other countries with populations in Paris include Burkina Faso, the Congo, Guinea, Mali, and Senegal.

=== Asians ===
As of 1998 Île-de-France has half of the Asian population of France. As of 1990 the majority of Asians living in France are ethnic Chinese originating from several countries.

In 1974 France stopped allowing foreign workers into its borders. The Asian population of France increased despite the closure. In 1975 there were 20,000 Asians in Île-de-France. In 1982 the region had 59,000. This increased to 108,000 in 1990.

In France the "Asians" are defined as people originating from the East Asian cultural sphere. The term does not include people from the Indian subcontinent.

==== Geography of the Asian population ====
For the entire Île-de-France region, there were a total of 108,511 persons who held or formerly held Cambodian, Chinese, Laotian, Taiwanese, and Vietnamese citizenships as of 1990. This included 64,361 current citizens of those countries and 44,150 former citizens who became naturalized as French citizens.

As of 1990, there were a combined total of 31,773 persons who held or formerly held Cambodian, Chinese, Laotian, Taiwanese, and Vietnamese citizenships in the City of Paris. This included 21,655 current citizens of those countries and 10,118 former citizens who became naturalized as French citizens.

As of 1990 fewer than 10,000 persons of East/Southeast Asian origin resided in six communes of Marne-la-Vallée. 26% of the population of Lognes was Asian, and other percentages were 8% in Noisiel, 5–6% in Noisy-le-Grand, and 5–6% in Torcy. In 1982 there were 6,000 Asians in Marne-la-Vallée, making up 3–4% of the area's population. In 1987 the number increased to 9,000.

As of circa 1998 Ivry-sur-Seine and Vitry-sur-Seine had a combined Asian population of 3,600.

As of circa 1998 there were about 6,000 East/Southeast Asians in and around Aulnay-sous-Bois, and there were 3,000 persons of East and Southeast Asian origin in Aulnay proper. Most of them were of Cambodian origin, including those with and without Cambodian citizenship. The commune also had an above-average number of persons of Laotian origin, including those with and without Laotian citizenship. Ethnicities included Khmer people, Lao people, and Overseas Chinese.

==== Cambodians ====
As of 1990, in the City of Paris there were 7,950 Cambodian citizens and 3,279 former Cambodian citizens who became naturalized as French. The combined total is 11,229.

That year, in the Île-de-France region there were 26,553 Cambodian citizens and 13,068 former Cambodian citizens naturalized as French. The combined total was 39,421.

==== Chinese ====
The Olympiades towers with the pagoda roof shopping centre, Chinatown, Paris

As of 1990 the majority of Asians living in the Paris area are ethnic Chinese originating from several countries. The largest group includes ethnic Chinese from Indochina, and a smaller group originates from Zhejiang.

==== Japanese ====
As of 2013 the official number of Japanese residents in Paris was 16,277.

==== Laotians ====
As of 1990, in the City of Paris there were 2,185 Laotian citizens and 1,376 former Laotian citizens naturalized as French, making a combined total of 3,561.

As of that year, in the Île-de-France region there were 10,110 Laotian citizens and 8,177 former Laotian citizens, making a combined total of 18,287.

==== Vietnamese ====
In periods before 1975 several Vietnamese arrived in Paris, including intellectuals, those who worked as civil servants in colonial times, and those who came to Paris to study and did not return home. Ethnic Vietnamese arriving after 1975 became a part of an ethnic network established by those that came before them. Many Vietnamese achieved proficiency in the medical, scientific, and computer science fields.

As of 1990, in the City of Paris there were 3,802 Vietnamese citizens and 4,155 former Vietnamese citizens naturalized as French, making a total of 7,957.

As of that year, in the Île-de-France region there were 16,387 Vietnamese citizens and 20,261 former Vietnamese citizens naturalized as French, making a total of 36,648.

==== Romani ====
Romani people first arrived in Paris in 1427.

== Historical population ==
Population density of Paris
1807

1817

1831

1836

1841

1846

1851

1856

1861

1866

1872

1876

1881

1886

1891

1896

1901

1906

1911

1921

1926

1931

1936

1946

1954

1962

1968

1975

1982

1990

1999

2007

2012

2017

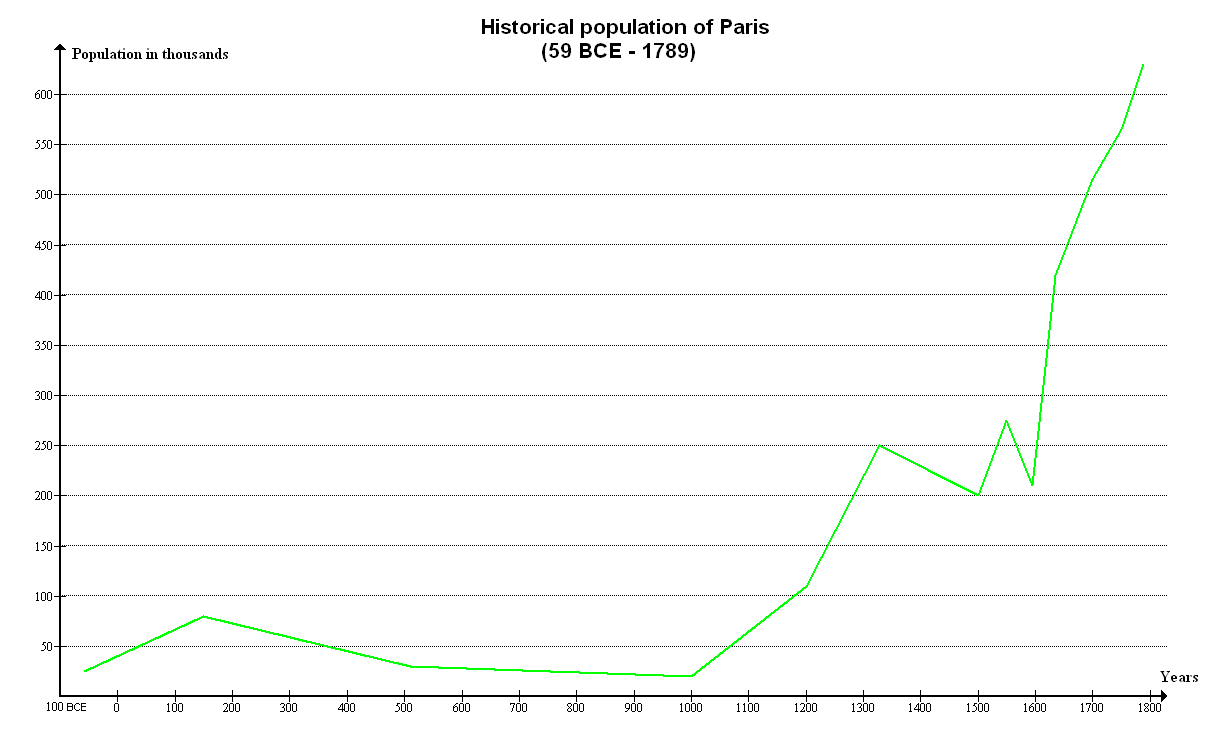
Population of Paris from Julius Caesar to the French Revolution.

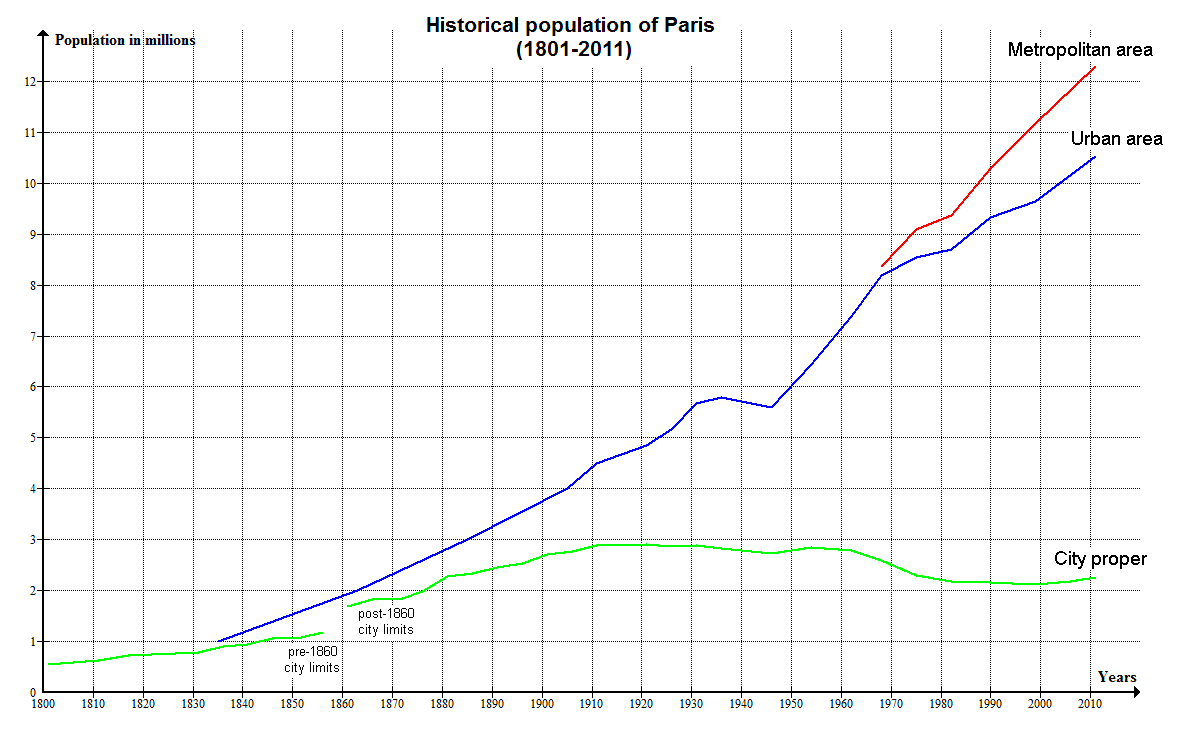
City proper, urban area, and metropolitan area population from 1801 to 2010.

Notes for the table:

- until the 1830s, urbanization was contained within the administrative borders of the City of Paris; urban area figures before 1835 are thus the same as the city proper figures
- the phenomenon of long commutes did not appear until the 1960s; metropolitan area figures before 1968 are thus essentially the same as the urban area figures
- time comparisons should be exercised with care, as statistical borders vary year after year. E.g., the metropolitan area figure for 1968 is within the 1968 borders of the metropolitan area, whereas the metropolitan area figure for 1975 is within the 1975 expanded borders of the metropolitan area.

Paris rose from 4.9% of the French population in 1801, to 8% in 1861, to 11.5% in 1901 to then 14.5% in 1921.

Historical Population
	City proper	Urban area	Metropolitan area	Comments
59 BC	25,000			Gallic population of the city at the start of the Roman conquest of Gaul.
150 AD	80,000			Peak of Roman era.
510	30,000			
700s	20,000 – 30,000			Losses after invasions of 3rd and 4th centuries.
1000	15,000			Lowest point after Viking invasions.
1200	44,000			Recovery of the High Middle Ages.
1300	75,000			
1328	83,000			
1348	89,000			
1400	54,000			Losses of the Black Plague.
1500	94,000			
1550	168,000			
1600	300,000			
1650	387,000			
1700	500,000			
1750	524,000			
1789	530,000			
	City proper	Urban area	Metropolitan area	Comments
1801	546,856			Losses of French Revolution and wars.
1811	622,636			
1817	713,966			
1831	785,862			
1835		1,000,000		
1836	899,313			
1841	935,261			
1846	1,053,897			
1851	1,053,262			
1856	1,174,346			
1861	1,696,141			New city limits; population in 1856 in the new city limits was 1,538,613.
1863		2,000,000		Fastest historical growth under Emperor Napoleon III and Haussmann.
1866	1,825,274			
1872	1,851,792			Temporary stagnation due to the losses of the Siege of Paris during the Franco-Prussian War and the civil war of the Paris Commune and the Third Republic's brutal retribution towards the city.
1876	1,988,806			
1881	2,269,023			
1885		3,000,000		
1886	2,344,550			
1891	2,447,957			
1896	2,536,834			
	City proper	Urban area	Metropolitan area	Comments
1901	2,714,068			
1905		4,000,000		
1906	2,763,393			
1911	2,888,110	4,500,000		
1921	2,906,472	4,850,000		Temporary stagnation due to losses of First World War.
1926	2,871,429	5,160,008		
1931	2,891,020	5,674,419		
1936	2,829,753	5,784,072		
1946	2,725,374	5,600,000		Losses of Second World War.
1954	2,850,189	6,436,296		
1962	2,790,091	7,384,363		Fastest population growth in the 20th century.
1968	2,590,771	8,567,186	9,761,302	End of postwar baby boom, end of immigration surplus for Paris; henceforth migration flows from the rest of France become negative, population growth is significantly slower.
1975	2,299,830	9 030,876	10,456,864	End of postwar baby boom, end of immigration surplus for Paris; henceforth migration flows from the rest of France become negative, population growth is significantly slower.
1982	2,176,243	9,109,741	10,718,634	
1990	2,152,423	9,541,339	11,392,740	
1999	2,125,246	9,727,177	11,729,644	
2007	2,193,030	10,295,104	12,414,712	
2012	2,240,621	10,544,575	12,734,837	
2017	2,187,526	10,779,543	13,024,518	
2023	2,103,778	11,013,774	13,320,752	
Sources: City proper figures from 1801 on, urban area figures from 1954 on, and metropolitan area figures from 1990 on are official census figures.; City proper figures before 1801 and urban area figures before 1954 are estimates from various sources.; Metropolitan area figures before 1990 were reconstructed by Ph. Julien of INSEE by applying the current INSEE definition of metropolitan areas to past censuses.

== See also ==
- Demographics of France
- List of metropolitan areas by population
- Larger urban zone
- Largest urban areas of the European Union

== Bibliography ==
- Goebel, Michael. Anti-Imperial Metropolis: Interwar Paris and the Seeds of Third World Nationalism (Cambridge University Press, 2015) excerpts
- Zarka, Yves Charles; Taussig, Sylvie; Fleury, Cynthia (2004). "Les contours d'une population susceptible d'être musulmane d'après la filiation". L'Islam en France (in French). Presses universitaires de France. ISBN 978-2-13-053723-6.
