= Île-de-France =

Administrative region of France

Coordinates: 48°30′N 2°30′E

- Region
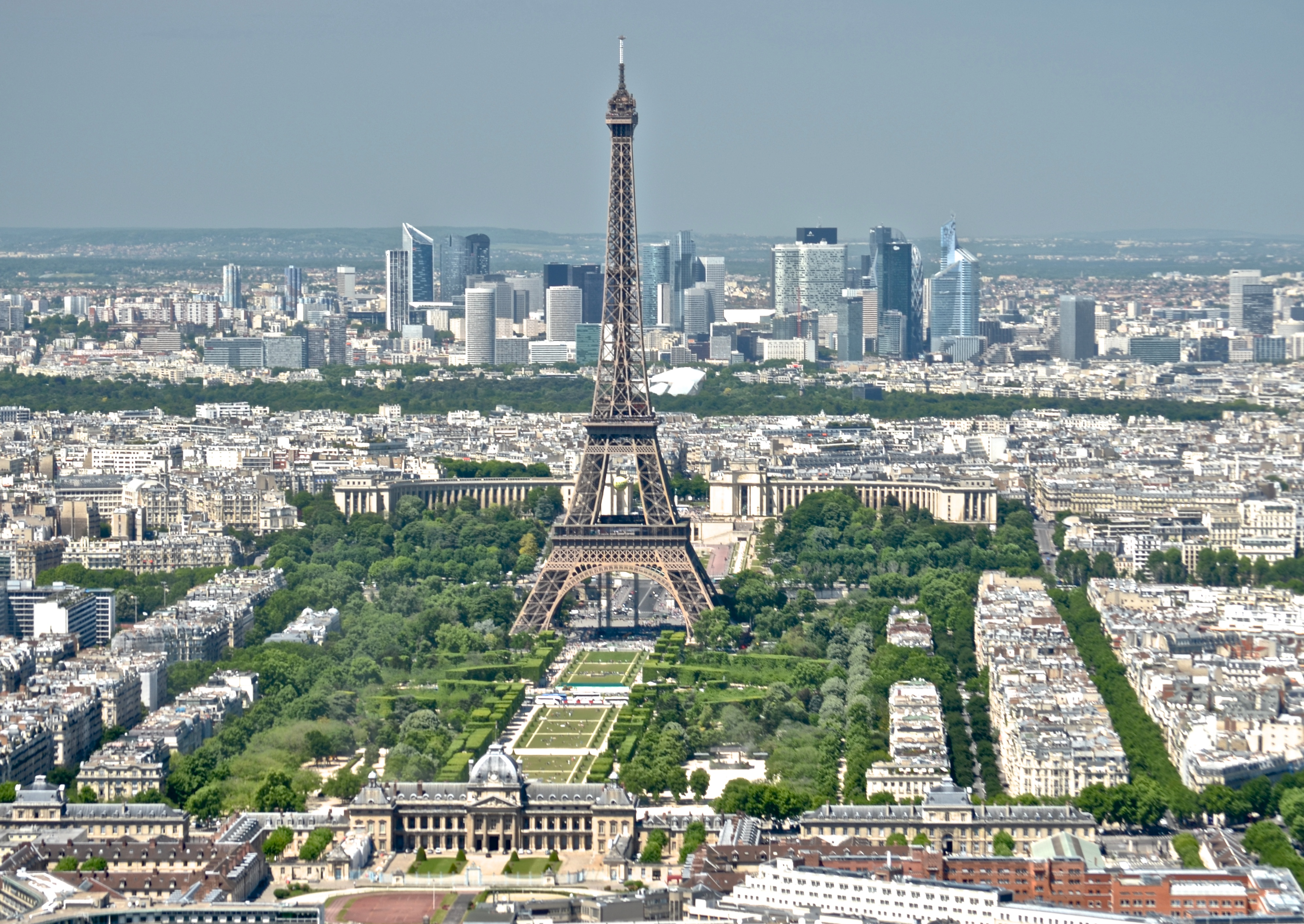
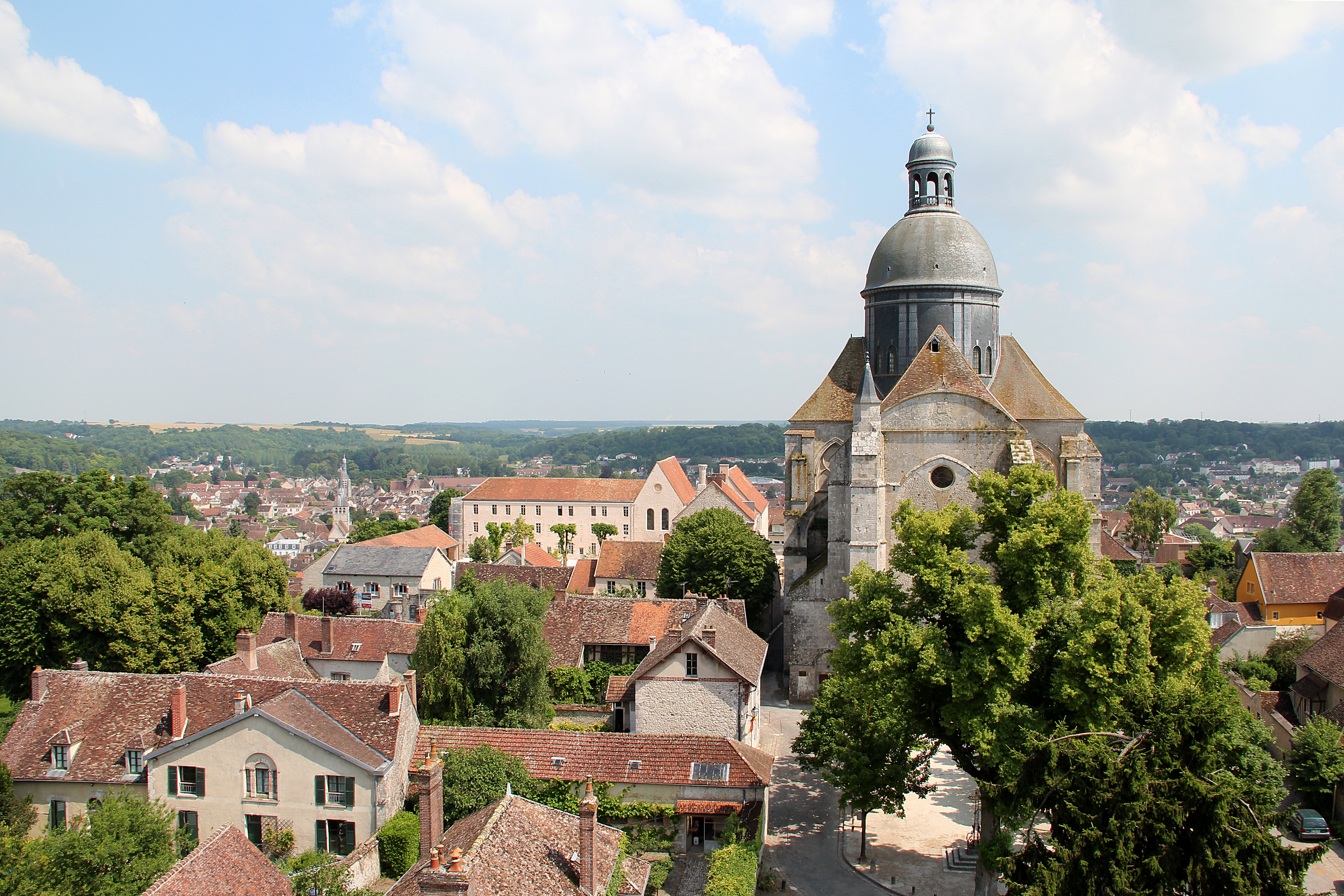
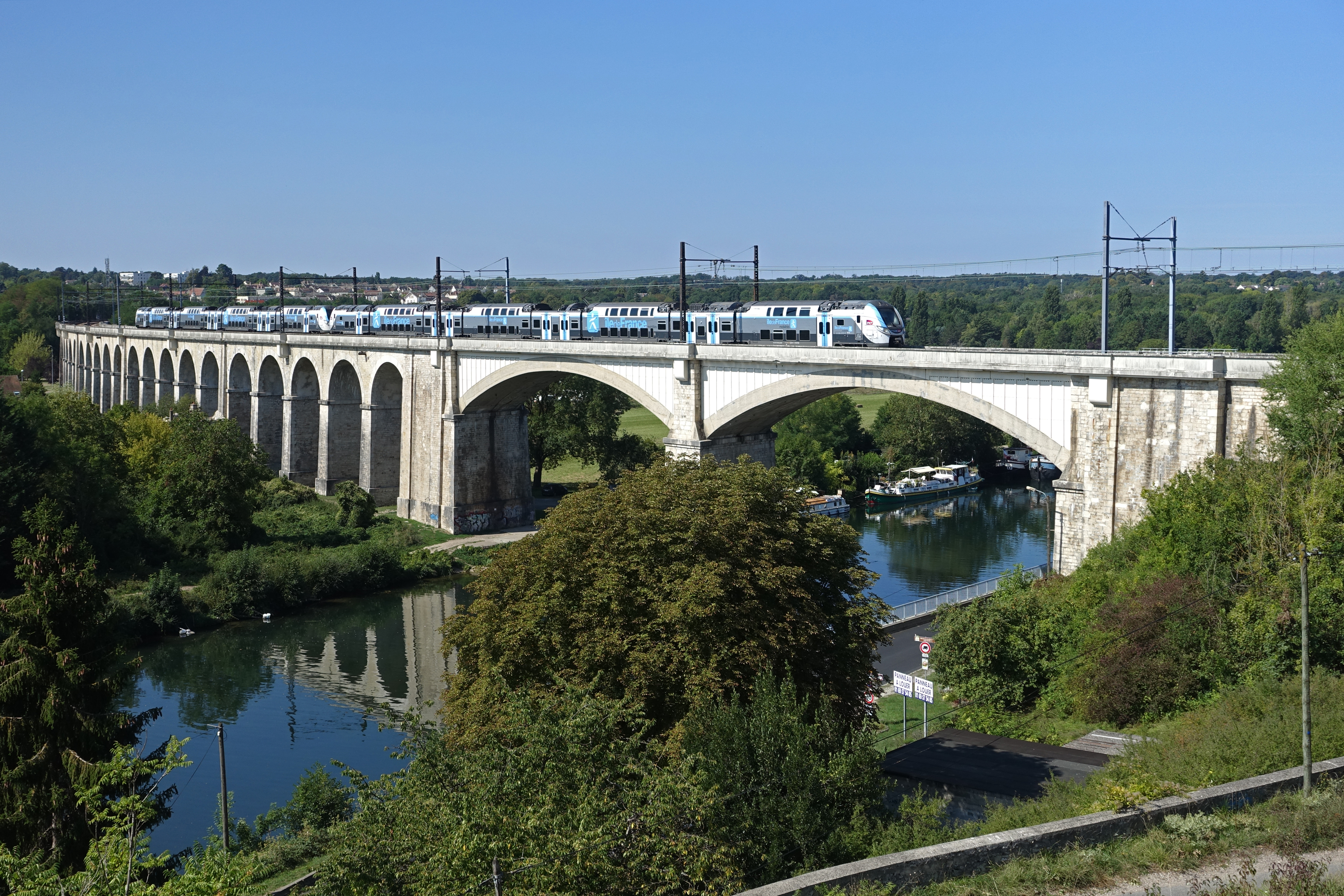
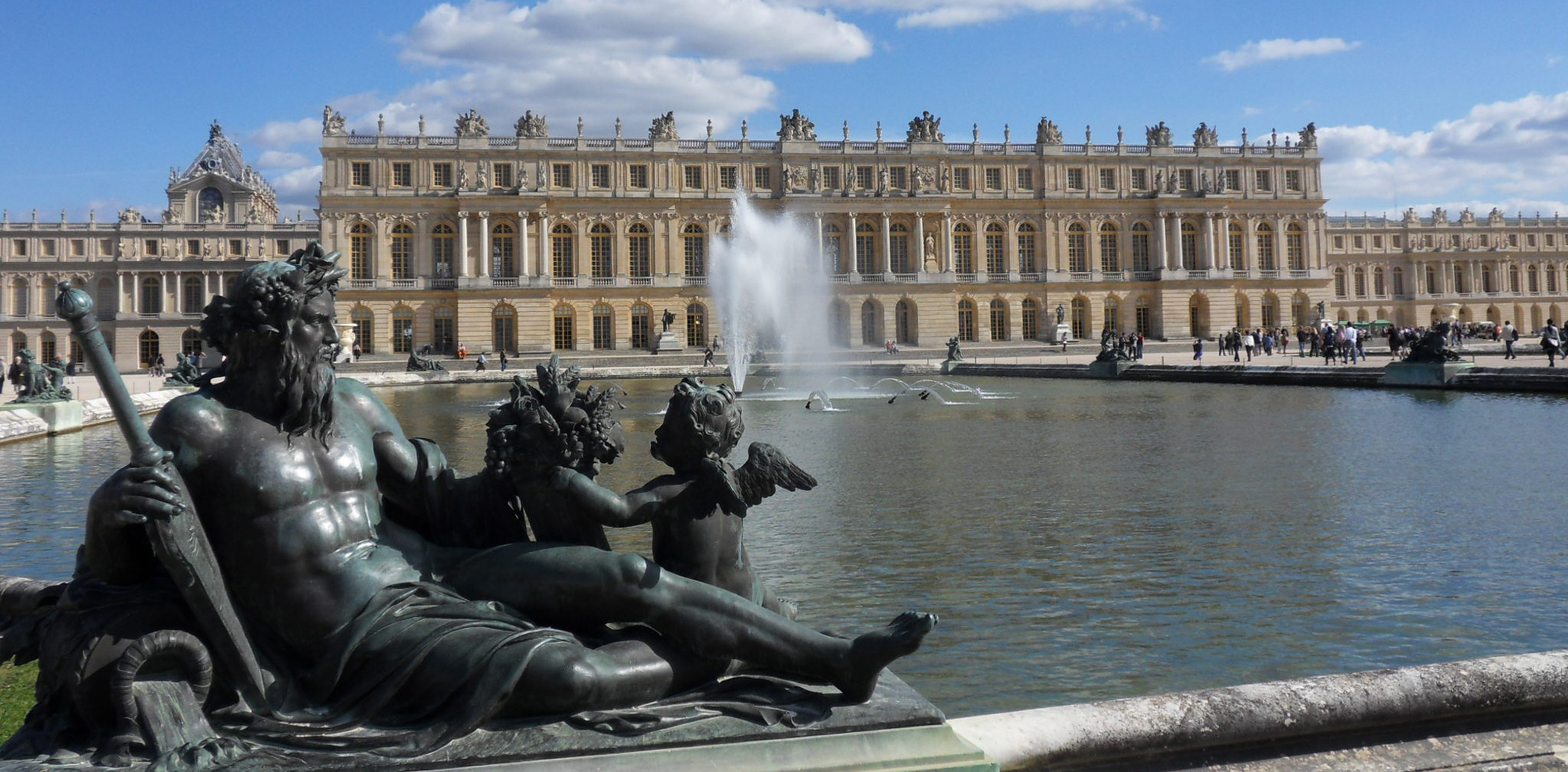
- Clockwise from top: western Paris and La Défense in the distance; the Viaduc of Saint-Mammès; the Palace of Versailles; and the UNESCO World Heritage Site of Provins

- Wordmark

- Île-de-France within metropolitan France
- Interactive map of Île-de-France
- Country: France
- Prefecture: Paris
- Departments: 8: Paris (75); Seine-et-Marne (77); Yvelines (78); Essonne (91); Hauts-de-Seine (92); Seine-Saint-Denis (93); Val-de-Marne (94); Val-d'Oise (95)

Government
  - President of the Regional Council: Valérie Pécresse (LR)

Area
  - Total: 12,012 km^{2} (4,638 sq mi)
  - Rank: 12th

Population (1 January 2023)
  - Total: 12,271,794
  - Rank: 1st
  - Density: 1,022/km^{2} (2,650/sq mi)
- Demonym: French: Francilien

GDP (2024)
  - Total: €865.65 billion (US$977.03 billion)
  - Per capita: €68,982 (US$77,857.79)
- Time zone: UTC+01:00 (CET)
  - Summer (DST): UTC+02:00 (CEST)
- ISO 3166 code: FR-IDF
- NUTS Region: FR1
- Website: www.iledefrance.fr

The Île-de-France (/ˌiːl də ˈfrɒ̃s/; French: [il də fʁɑ̃s]; lit. 'Island of France') is the most populous of the eighteen regions of France, with an official estimated population of 12,271,794 residents on 1 January 2023. Containing the capital city of France, Paris, it is located in the north-central part of the country and often called the Paris Region (French: Région parisienne, pronounced [ʁeʒjɔ̃ paʁizjɛn]). Île-de-France is densely populated and retains a prime economic position on the national stage. It covers 12,012 square kilometres (4,638 square miles), about 2% of metropolitan French territory. Its 2017 population was nearly one-fifth of the national total.

The region is made up of eight administrative departments: Paris, Essonne, Hauts-de-Seine, Seine-Saint-Denis, Seine-et-Marne, Val-de-Marne, Val-d'Oise and Yvelines. It was created as the "District of the Paris Region" in 1961. In 1976, when its status was aligned with the French administrative regions created in 1972, it was renamed after the historic province of Île-de-France. Residents are sometimes referred to as Franciliens, an administrative word created in the 1980s. The GDP of the region in 2019 was nearly one-third of the total for France, and 5% of the European Union's. It has the highest per capita GDP of any French region.

Beyond the city limits of Paris, the region has many other important historic sites, including the palaces of Versailles and Fontainebleau, as well as the most-visited tourist attraction in France, Disneyland Paris. Although it is the richest French region, a significant number of residents live in poverty. The official poverty rate in the Île-de-France was 15.9% in 2015. The region has witnessed increasing income inequality in recent decades, and rising housing prices have pushed the less affluent outside Paris.

== Etymology ==
Although the modern name Île-de-France literally means Island of France, its etymology is unclear. Despite its name, the region itself is not an island. The "island" may refer to the land between the rivers Oise, Marne and Seine, or it may also have been a reference to the Île de la Cité, where the French royal palace and cathedral were located.

Alternatively, the name may refer to the lands that were under the direct rule of the Capetian kings during the Middle Ages; thus, the lands were an "island" in a sea of various feudal territories ruled by vassals of the king.

== History ==
Historic extent of the Île-de-France

The Île-de-France was inhabited by the Parisii, a sub-tribe of the Celtic Senones, from around the middle of the 3rd-century BC. One of the area's major north–south trade routes crossed the Seine on the île de la Cité; the meeting place of land and water trade routes gradually became an important trading centre. The Parisii traded with many river towns (some as far away as the Iberian Peninsula) and minted their own coins for that purpose.

The Romans conquered the area in 52 BC and began their settlement on Paris's Left Bank. It became a prosperous city with a forum, baths, temples, theatres, and an amphitheatre. Christianity was introduced in the middle of the 3rd century AD by Saint Denis, the first Bishop of Paris. According to legend, when Denis refused to renounce his faith before Roman authorities, he was beheaded on the hill that became known as Mons Martyrum (Latin "Hill of Martyrs"), later "Montmartre". The legend further states that Denis walked headless from this hill to the north of the city. The place that he finally fell and was buried became an important religious shrine, the Basilica of Saint-Denis.

Clovis the Frank, the first king of the Merovingian dynasty, made the city his capital in 508. As the Frankish domination of Gaul began, there was a gradual immigration by the Franks to Paris and the Parisian Francien dialects were born. Fortification of the Île de la Cité failed to avert sacking by Vikings in 845, but Paris's strategic importance—with its bridges preventing ships from passing—was established by successful defence in the Siege of Paris (885–86). In 987, Hugh Capet, Count of Paris (comte de Paris) and Duke of the Franks (duc des Francs), was elected King of the Franks (roi des Francs). Under the rule of the Capetian kings, Paris gradually became the largest and most prosperous city in France.

The Kings of France enjoyed getting away from Paris and hunting in the game-filled forests of the region. They built palatial hunting lodges, most notably Palace of Fontainebleau and the Palace of Versailles. From the time of Louis XIV to the French Revolution, Versailles was the official residence of the Kings and the seat of the French government. Île-de-France became the term used for the territory of Paris and the surrounding province, which was administered directly by the King.

During the French Revolution, the royal provinces were abolished and divided into departments, and the city and region were governed directly by the national government. After World War II, as Paris faced a major housing shortage, hundreds of massive apartment blocks for low-income residents were built around the edges of Paris. In the 1950s and the 1960s, thousands of immigrants settled in the communes bordering the city. In 1959, under President Charles De Gaulle, a new region was created out of six departments, which corresponded approximately with the historic region, with the name District de la région de Paris ("District of the Paris Region"). On 6 May 1976, as part of the process of regionalisation, the district was reconstituted with increased administrative and political powers and renamed the Île-de-France region.

== Geography ==
Île-de-France is in the north of France, neighboring Hauts-de-France to the north, Grand Est to the east, Bourgogne-Franche-Comté to the southeast, Centre-Val-de-Loire to the southwest, and Normandy to the west.

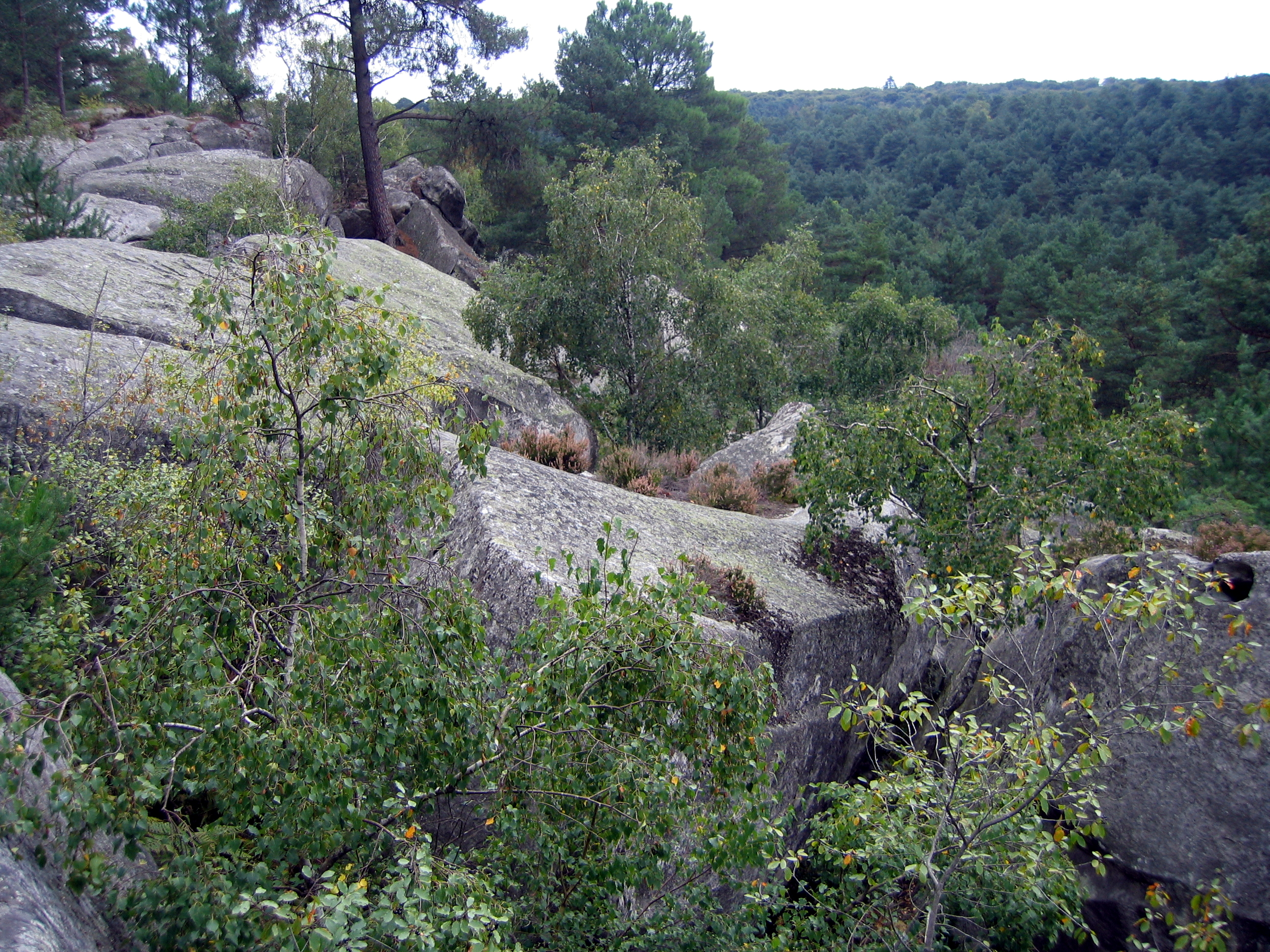
View of the forest of Fontainebleau in Seine-et-Marne

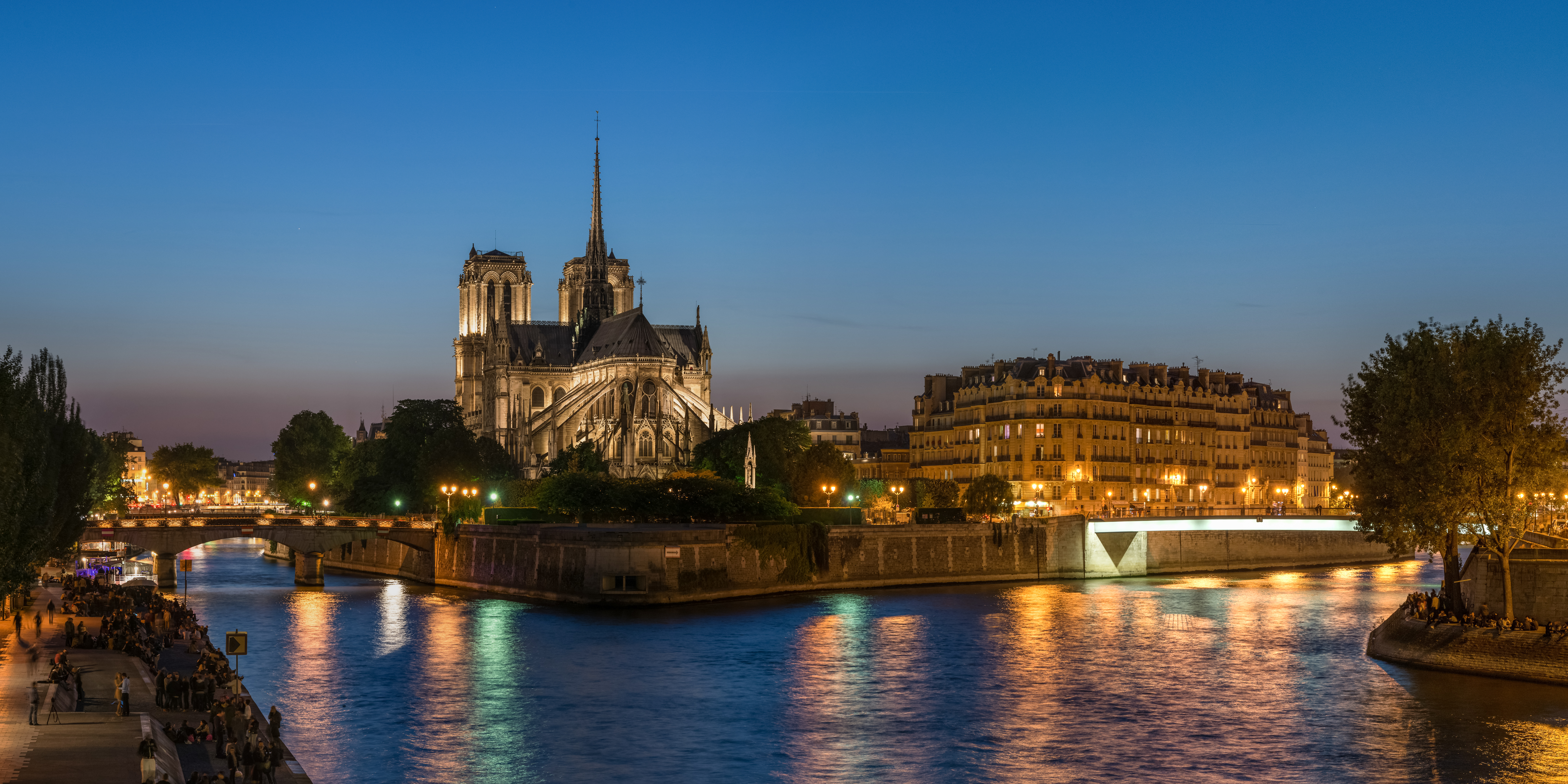
The Seine in Paris

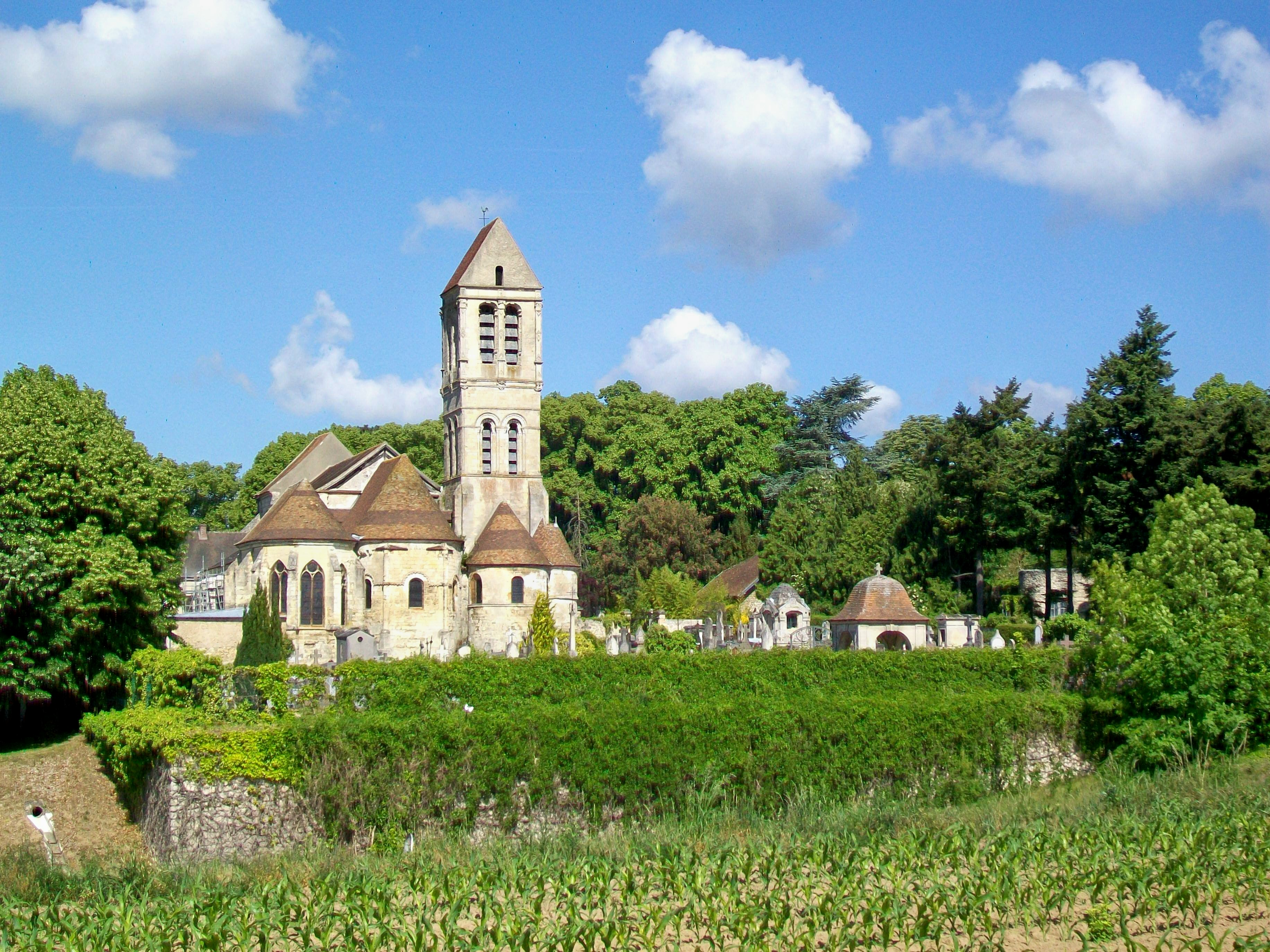
Vineyard in Luzarches, Val-d'Oise

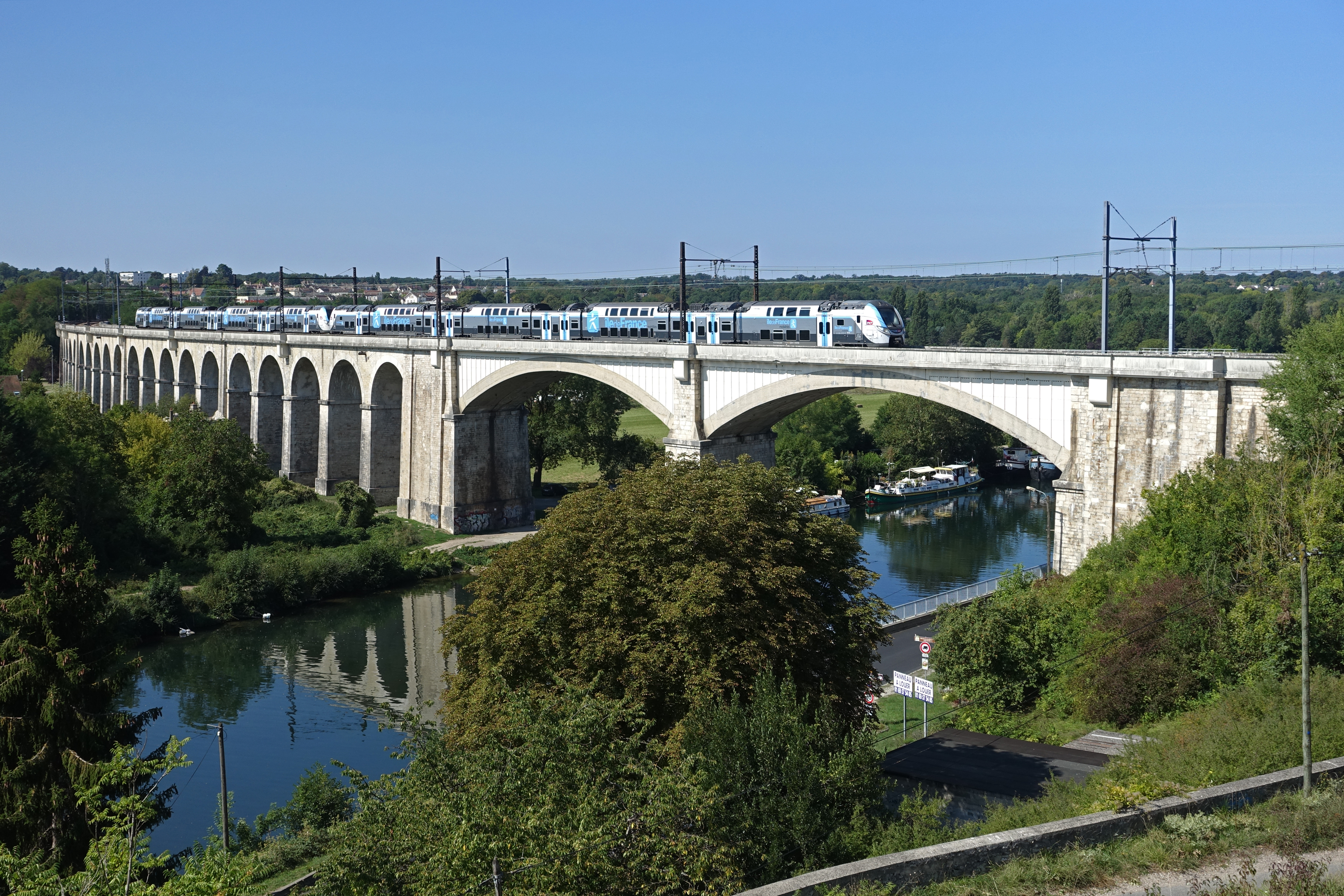
Transilien Line R train between Veneux-les-Sablons and Saint-Mammès

=== Departments ===
Île-de-France has a land area of 12,011 km^{2} (4,637 sq mi). It is composed of eight departments centred on its innermost department and capital, Paris. Around the department and municipality of Paris, urbanisation fills a first concentric ring of three departments commonly known as the petite couronne ("small ring"); it extends into a second outer ring of four departments known as the grande couronne ("large ring"). The former department of Seine, abolished in 1968, included the city proper and parts of the petite couronne.

The petite couronne consists of the departments of Hauts-de-Seine, Paris, Seine-Saint-Denis and Val-de-Marne; the grande couronne consists of those of Seine-et-Marne, Yvelines, Essonne and Val-d'Oise. Politically, the region is divided into 8 departments, 25 arrondissements, 155 cantons and 1,276 communes, out of the total of 35,416 in metropolitan France.

Department	Area km^{2}	Population	GDP	GDP per capita
Paris	105	2,133,111	€253.101 billion	€118,653
Hauts-de-Seine	176	1,635,291	€188.333 billion	€115,168
Seine-Saint-Denis	236	1,668,670	€66.227 billion	€39,688
Val-de-Marne	245	1,415,367	€56.818 billion	€40,144
Val-d'Oise	1,246	1,256,607	€38.861 billion	€30,925
Seine-et-Marne	5,915	1,438,100	€42.983 billion	€29,889
Essonne	1,804	1,313,768	€58.462 billion	€44,500
Yvelines	2,284	1,456,365	€60.058 billion	€42,238
Île-de-France	12,012	12,317,279	€764.844 billion	€62,095

Departements of the Île-de-France region.

=== Topography ===
The outer parts of the Île-de-France remain largely rural. Agricultural land, forest and natural spaces occupy 78.9 percent of the region, and 28 percent of the region's land is in urban use.

The River Seine flows through the middle of the region, which is crisscrossed by its tributaries and sub-tributaries, including the Rivers Marne, Oise and Epte. The River Eure does not cross the region but receives water from several rivers in the Île-de-France, including the Drouette and the Vesgre. The major rivers are navigable, and, because of the modest variations of altitude in the region (between 10 metres (33 ft) and 200 metres (660 ft)), they have a tendency to meander and curve. They also create many lakes and ponds, some of which have been transformed into recreation areas, including Moisson-Mousseaux, Cergy-Neuville and Villeneuve-Saint-Georges.

== Economy ==
Paris as an engine of the global economy: the skyscrapers of La Défense, the largest purpose-built business district of Europe, with 3.35 million m² (36 million sq. ft) of office space.

Île-de-France produced €742 billion (gross domestic product) or around 1/3 of the economy of France in 2019. The regional economy has gradually shifted toward high-value-added service industries (finance, IT services etc.) and high-tech manufacturing (electronics, optics, aerospace etc.). In 2014, industry represented just under five percent of active enterprises in the region, and 10.2 percent of salaried workers. Commerce and services account for 84 percent of the business establishments in the region, and have 83.3 percent of the salaried employees. Financial services and insurance are important sectors of the regional economy; the major French banks and insurance companies, including BNP Paribas, Société Générale and Crédit Agricole, all have their headquarters in the region. The region also hosts the headquarters of the top French telecom companies and utilities, including Orange S.A., Veolia and EDF. The French stock market, the Bourse de Paris, now known as Euronext Paris, occupies a historical building in the center of Paris and is ranked fourth among global stock markets, after New York, Tokyo and London. Other major sectors of the regional economy include energy companies (Orano, Engie, Électricité de France and Total S.A.). The two major French automobile manufacturers, Renault, in Flins-sur-Seine, and Groupe PSA, in Poissy, do much of their assembly work outside France but still have research centre and large plants in the region. The leading French and European aerospace and defense companies, including Airbus, Thales Group, Dassault Aviation, Safran Aircraft Engines, the European Space Agency, Alcatel-Lucent, and Arianespace, have a large presence in the region.

The region is served by Charles de Gaulle Airport. The airport is also the hub of Air France. In 2024, the airport handled 70,290,260 passengers and 466,543 aircraft movements, making it the world's fourteenth busiest airport and Europe's third busiest airport (after Heathrow and Istanbul) in terms of passenger numbers. Charles de Gaulle is the busiest airport within the European Union. In terms of cargo traffic, the airport is the second busiest in Europe, after Frankfurt, handling 1,914,681 tonnes of cargo in 2024. As of 2025, it was the airport served by the second highest number of airlines, after Suvarnabhumi Airport, with 105 airlines operating from it. Orly Airport also remains the busiest French airport for domestic traffic and the second busiest French airport overall in passenger traffic, with 33,123,027 passengers in 2024.

The energy sector is also well established in the region. The nuclear power industry, with its major firm being Orano, has its headquarters in Île-de-France, as does the main French oil company Total S.A., the top French company in the Fortune Global 500, and the main electric utility, Électricité de France. The energy firm Engie also has its main offices in the region at La Défense.

Headquarters of TotalEnergies in La Défense

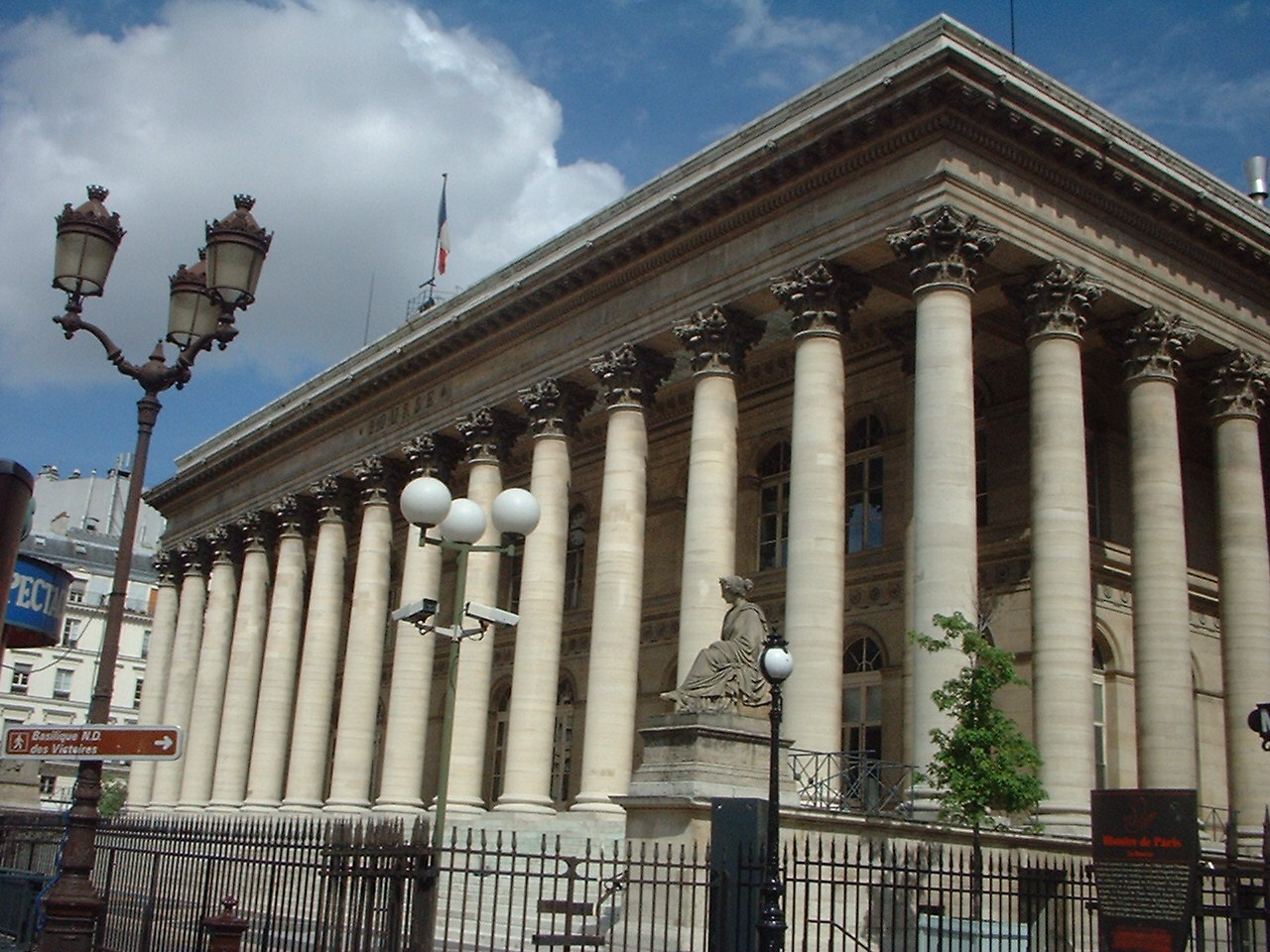
The historic Bourse de Paris, or Paris stock market, now called Euronext Paris

Headquarters of Société Générale in La Défense

=== Employment ===
In 2018 just 7.2 percent of employees in the region were engaged in industry; 62.3 percent were engaged in commerce and market services; 25.5 percent in non-market services, including government, health and education; 4.8 percent in construction; and 0.2 percent in agriculture.

The largest non-government employers in the region as of the end of 2015 were the airline Air France (40,657); the SNCF (French Railways, 31,955); the telecom firm Orange S.A. (31,497); the bank Société Générale (27,361); the automotive firm Groupe PSA (19,648); EDF (Electricité de France, 18,199); and Renault (18,136). While the Petite Couronne, or departments closest to Paris, previously employed the most industrial workers, the largest number is now in the Grande Couronne, the outer departments.

The unemployment rate in the region stood at 8.6% at the end of 2016. It varied within the region from 7.8 percent in the city of Paris, to a high of 12.7 percent in Seine-Saint-Denis, and 10 percent in Val-d'Oise; to regional lows of 7.4 percent in Yvelines; 7.5 percent in Hauts-de-Seine; 7.7 percent in Essonne; 7.9 percent in Seine et Marne, and 8.8 percent in Val de Marne.

=== Agriculture ===
In 2018, 48 percent of the land of the Île-de-France was devoted to agriculture; 569,000 hectares were cultivated. The most important crops are grains (66 percent), followed by beets (7 percent), largely for industrial use, and grass for grazing. In 2014, 9,495 hectares were devoted to bio-agriculture. However, the number of persons employed in agriculture in the region dropped 33 percent between 2000 and 2015 to just 8,460 persons in 2015.

== Tourism ==
The Île-de-France is one of the world's top tourist destinations, with a record 23.6 million hotel arrivals in 2017, and an estimated 50 million visitors in all types of accommodation. The largest number of visitors came from the United States, followed by England, Germany and China. The top tourist attraction in the region in 2017 was Disneyland Paris, which received 14.8 million visitors in 2017, followed by the Cathedral of Notre-Dame (est. 12 million) and the Basilica of Sacre-Coeur at Montmartre (est. 11.1 million visitors).

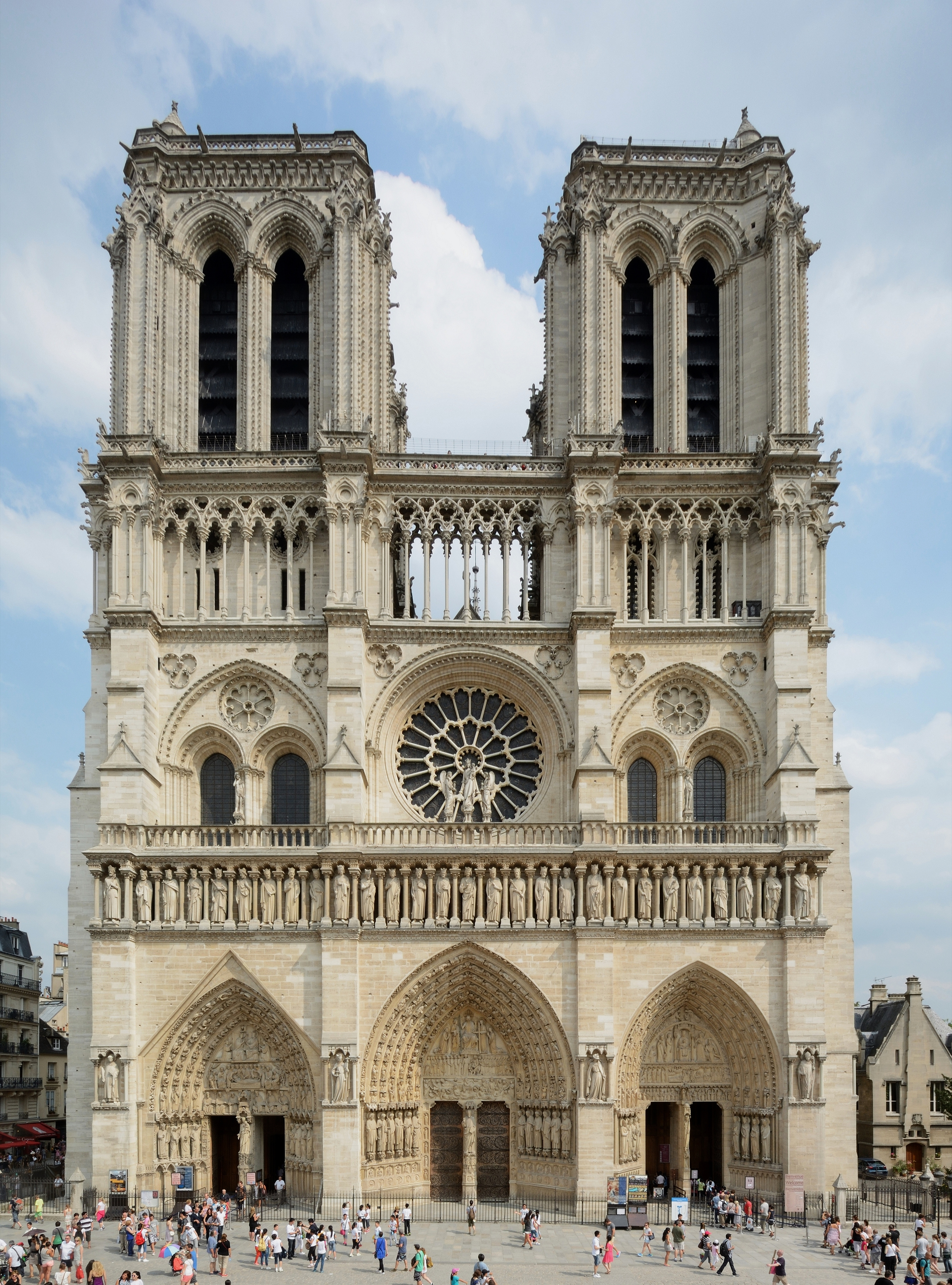
Notre-Dame Cathedral (12 million visitors in 2017)

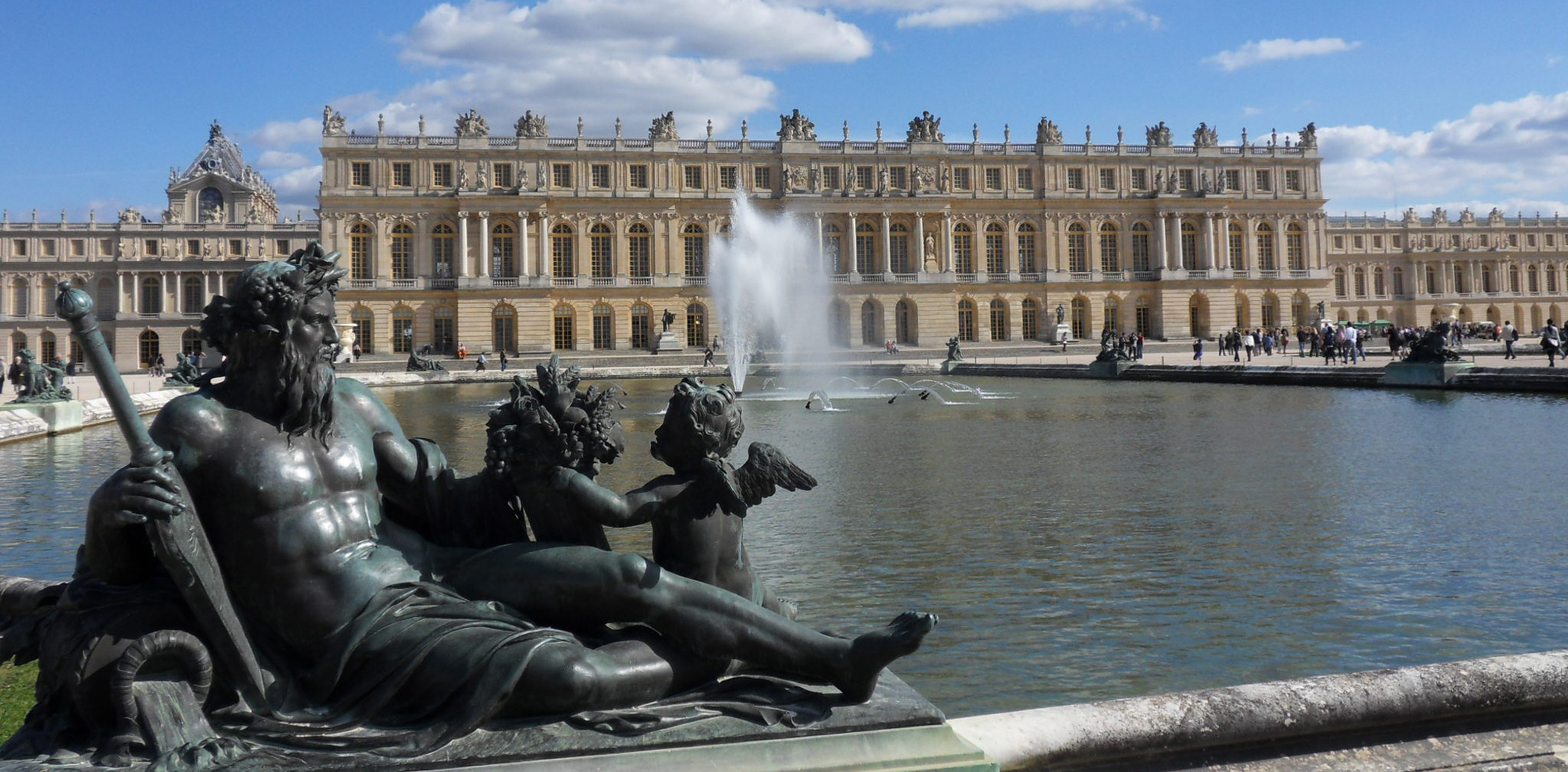
Palace of Versailles (7.7 million visitors in 2017)

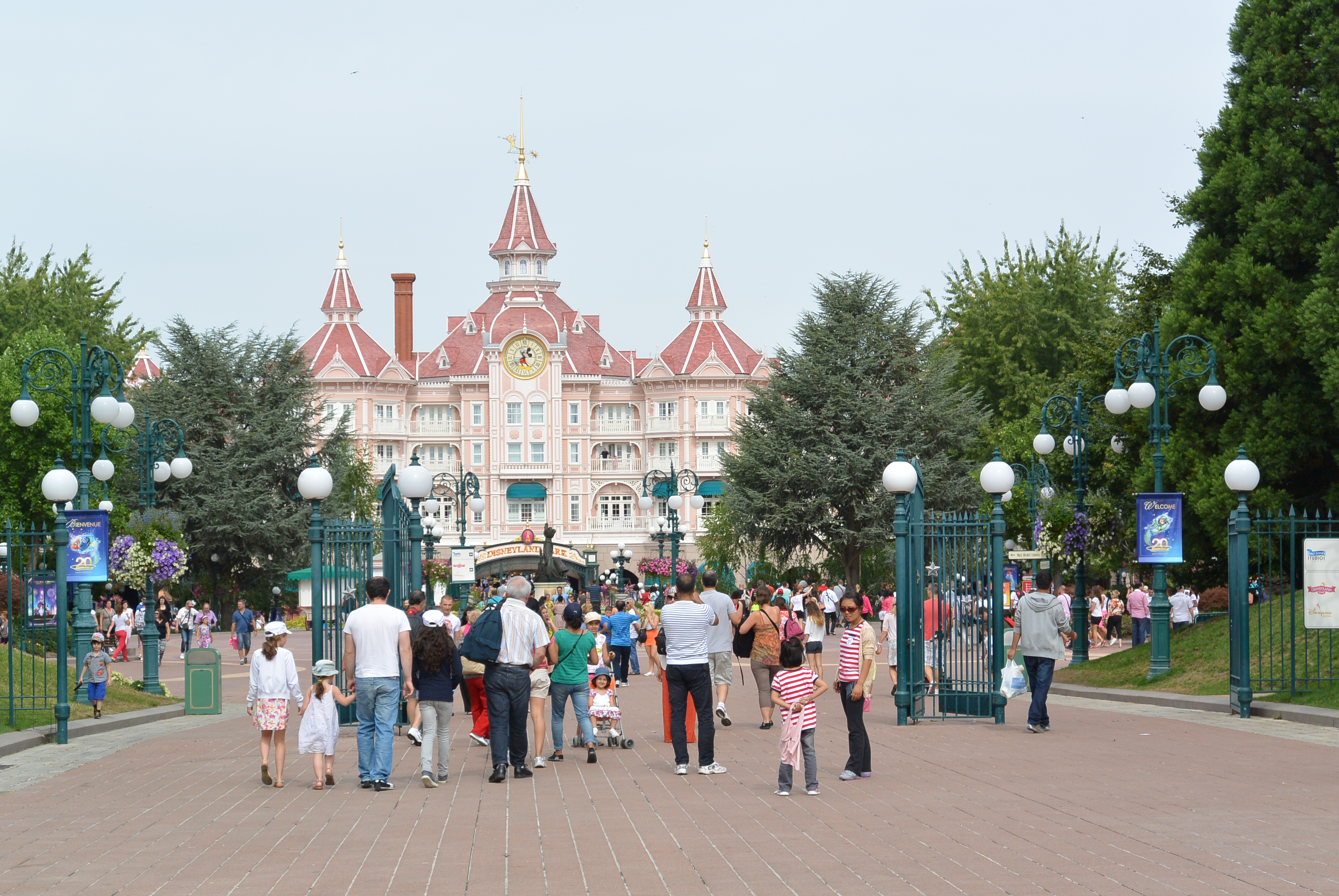
Disneyland Paris (14.8 million visitors in 2017)

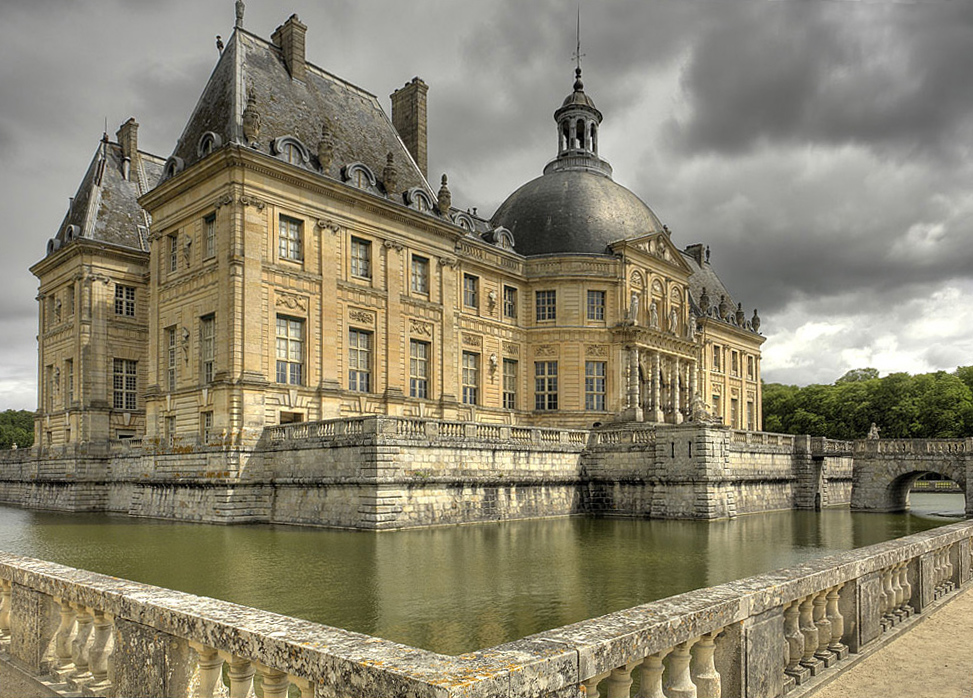
Château of Vaux le Vicomte

Notable historic monuments in the Region outside of Paris include the Palace of Versailles (7,700,000 visitors), the Palace of Fontainebleau (500,000 visitors), the chateau of Vaux-le-Vicomte (300,000 visitors), and the Château de Malmaison, Napoleon's former country house; and the Basilica of Saint-Denis, where the Kings of France were interred before the French Revolution.

== Sports ==
The Île-de-France is home to numerous high level sports clubs competing across France’s top levels. These include Paris Saint-Germain FC and Paris FC in Ligue 1, the top flight of French football, as well as Red Star FC, currently competing in Ligue 2, the nation’s second division.

In rugby union, the Île-de-France is home to Racing 92 and Stade Français of the Top 14, the top level of French rugby.

The region currently hosts two clubs competing in the LNH Division 1, the highest level of handball in France, Paris Saint-Germain Handball and Tremblay Handball.

The Île-de-France has also been the site of many notable sporting events, including the final of the 1998 FIFA World Cup, played at the Stade de France in Saint-Denis, as well as the 2024 Summer Olympics, held in Paris.

== Regional government and politics ==
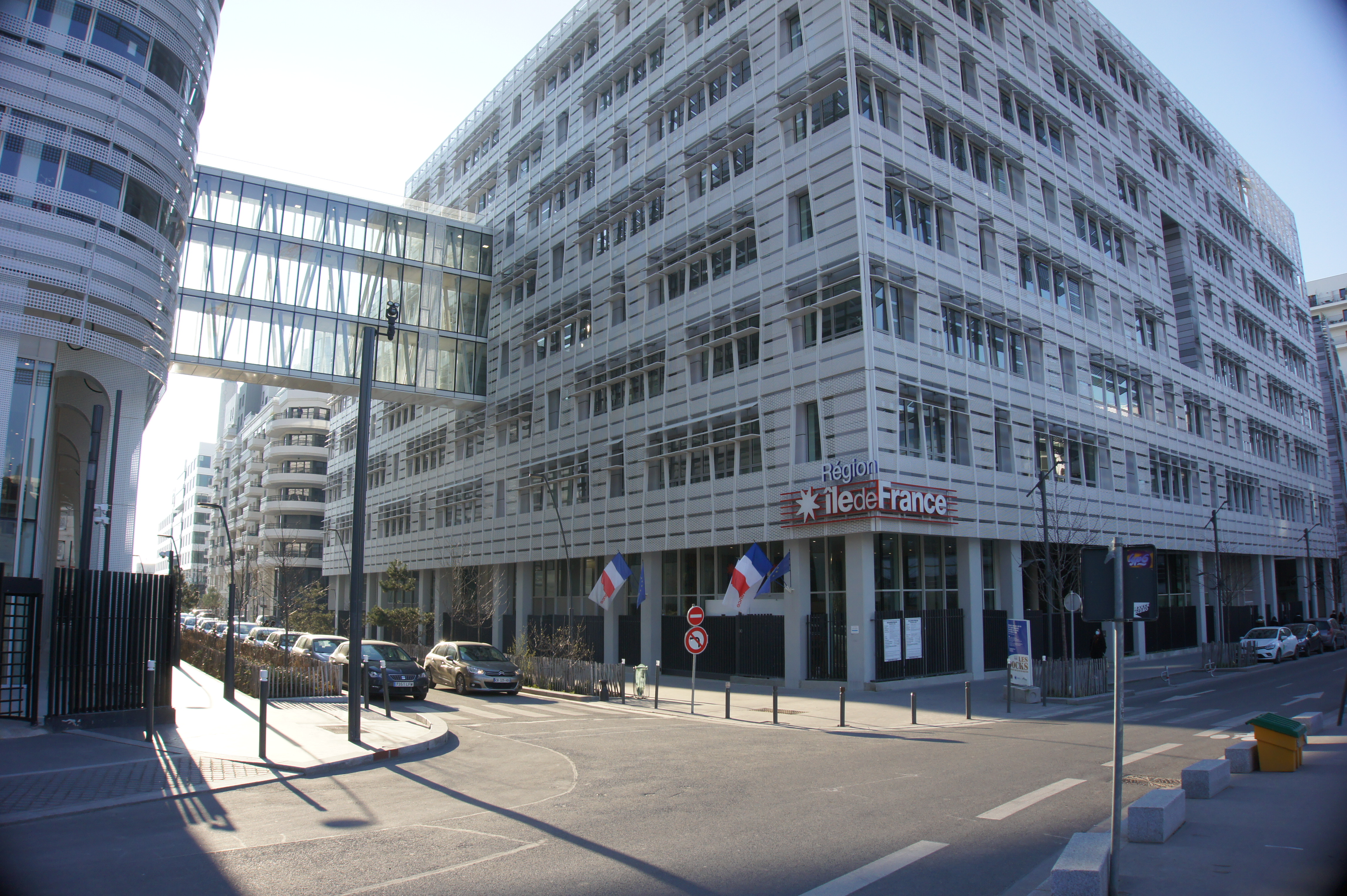
Seat of the regional council of Île-de-France in Saint-Ouen-sur-Seine (2021)

The Regional Council is the legislative body of the region. Its seat is in Saint-Ouen-sur-Seine, at 2 rue Simone-Veil. On 15 December 2015, a list of candidates of the Union of the Right, a coalition of centrist and right-wing parties, led by Valérie Pécresse, narrowly won the regional election, defeating the Union of the Left, a coalition of socialists and ecologists. The socialists had governed the region for the preceding 17 years.

Since 2016 the regional council has 121 members from the Union of the Right, 66 from the Union of the Left and 22 from the far-right National Front.

=== Holders of the executive office ===
- Delegates General for the District of the Paris Region
  - 1961–1969: Paul Delouvrier (civil servant) – Very influential term. Responsible for the creation of the RER express subway network in the Île-de-France and beyond.
  - 1969–1975: Maurice Doublet (civil servant)
  - 1975–1976: Lucien Lanier (civil servant)
- Presidents of the Regional Council of Île-de-France
  - 1976–1988: Michel Giraud (RPR politician) – (1st time)
  - 1988–1992: Pierre-Charles Krieg (RPR politician)
  - 1992–1998: Michel Giraud (RPR politician) – (2nd time)
  - 1998–2015: Jean-Paul Huchon (PS)
  - 2016– Valérie Pécresse (Union of the Centre-Right)

== Demographics ==
Île-de-France population pyramid in 2023

=== Population density ===
As of 1 January 2017, the population density of the region was 1010.9 inhabitants per square kilometer. The densest department is Paris itself, with 21,066 inhabitants per square kilometer. The least dense département is Seine-et-Marne with 239 residents per square kilometer.

=== Wealth and poverty ===
As of 2015 according to the official government statistics agency INSEE, 15.9 percent of residents of the region had an income below the poverty level; for residents of the city of Paris, this proportion was 16.2 percent. Poverty was highest in the departments of Seine-Saint-Denis (29 percent), Val-d'Oise (17.1 percent), and Val-de-Marne (16.8 percent). It was lowest in Yvelines (9.7 percent); Seine-et-Marne (11.8 percent), Essonne (12.9 percent), and Hauts-de-Seine (12.4 percent). The department of Hauts-de-Seine is the wealthiest in France in terms of per capita GDP.

=== Immigration ===
2023 Census Paris Region
- (Île-de-France)
Country/territory of birth	Population
Metropolitan France	9,100,643
Algeria	364,869
Morocco	281,066
Portugal	214,430
Tunisia	151,900
(Ivory Coast) Côte d'Ivoire	83,671
Guadeloupe	79,711
Mali	77,876
China	76,529
Senegal	73,060
Martinique	72,470
Turkey	71,926
Italy	59,241
Cameroon	54,080
(Democratic Republic of the Congo) DR Congo	53,434
Romania	53,140
Sri Lanka	48,586
Republic of the Congo	47,877
Spain	43,509
Other countries/territories
Haiti	38,476
Vietnam	36,611
India	36,415
Poland	32,546
Lebanon	28,941
Cambodia	28,746
Réunion	28,095
Brazil	24,672
Guinea	24,360
Pakistan	23,554
Madagascar	23,417
Serbia	23,062
Russia	21,635
Germany	20,559
United States	19,663
Colombia	19,002
Mauritius	18,847
French Guiana	18,122
United Kingdom	17,890
Comoros	17,157
(United Nations) Other countries and territories	953,279

At the 2019 census, 75.1% of the inhabitants of Île-de-France were natives of Metropolitan France, 1.7% were born in Overseas France, and 23.1% were born in foreign countries. A quarter of the immigrants living in the Île-de-France were born in Europe (38% of whom in Portugal), 29% were born in the Maghreb and 22% in the rest of Africa (in particular West and Central Africa), 3% were born in Turkey and 15% in the rest of Asia, 5% were born in the Americas (not counting those born in the French overseas departments in the Americas, who are not legally immigrants), and 0.1% in Oceania (not counting those born in the French territories of the South Pacific, who are not legally immigrants).

In 2013, roughly 2,206,000 residents of the Île-de-France were immigrants, born outside of France. This amounted to 18.5% of the population of the region, twice the national average. Four out of ten immigrants living in France reside in the region. The immigrant population of the Île-de-France has a higher proportion of non-Europeans, as well as a higher proportion of immigrants with an advanced level of education, than the rest of France. The population of immigrants is more widely distributed throughout the region than it was in the early 2000s, but the concentrations remain high in certain areas, particularly Paris and the department of Seine-Saint-Denis. The proportion of residents born outside of Metropolitan France rose between the 1999 (19.7%) and 2019 censuses (24.9%).

In 2024, 152,548 babies were born in Île-de-France. 69,602 or 45.6% were born to both parents that were also born in France, 16,103 or 10.6% had a French-born mother and a foreign-born father, 14,338 or 9.4% had a foreign-born mother and a French-born father, and 52,505 or 34.4% had both parents that were born abroad.

Place of birth of residents of Île-de-France (at the 1968, 1975, 1982, 1990, 1999, 2008, 2013, and 2019 censuses)
Census	Born in Metropolitan France	Born in Overseas France	Born in foreign countries with French citizenship at birth^{[a]}	Immigrants^{[b]}		
2019	75.1%	1.7%	3.4%	19.8%		
2019	75.1%	1.7%	3.4%	from Europe	from the Maghreb^{[c]}	from Africa (excl. Maghreb)
2019	75.1%	1.7%	3.4%	5.0%	5.8%	4.4%
2019	75.1%	1.7%	3.4%	from Turkey	from Asia (excl. Turkey)	from the Americas & Oceania
2019	75.1%	1.7%	3.4%	0.6%	3.0%	1.1%
2013	76.3%	1.7%	3.5%	18.5%		
2013	76.3%	1.7%	3.5%	from Europe	from the Maghreb^{[c]}	from Africa (excl. Maghreb)
2013	76.3%	1.7%	3.5%	5.0%	5.4%	3.8%
2013	76.3%	1.7%	3.5%	from Turkey	from Asia (excl. Turkey)	from the Americas & Oceania
2013	76.3%	1.7%	3.5%	0.6%	2.8%	1.0%
2008	77.4%	1.7%	3.5%	17.4%		
2008	77.4%	1.7%	3.5%	from Europe	from the Maghreb^{[c]}	from Africa (excl. Maghreb)
2008	77.4%	1.7%	3.5%	4.9%	5.1%	3.3%
2008	77.4%	1.7%	3.5%	from Turkey	from Asia (excl. Turkey)	from the Americas & Oceania
2008	77.4%	1.7%	3.5%	0.6%	2.5%	0.9%
1999	80.3%	1.8%	3.2%	14.7%		
1990	80.4%	1.9%	3.7%	14.0%		
1982	81.1%	1.7%	3.9%	13.3%		
1975	82.9%	1.0%	3.9%	12.2%		
1968	85.3%	0.5%	4.0%	10.2%		
^aPersons born abroad of French parents, such as Pieds-Noirs and children of French expatriates.^bAn immigrant is by French definition a person born in a foreign country and who did not have French citizenship at birth. An immigrant may have acquired French citizenship since moving to France, but is still listed as an immigrant in French statistics. On the other hand, persons born in France with foreign citizenship (the children of immigrants) are not listed as immigrants.^cMorocco, Tunisia, Algeria
Source: INSEE

=== Petite Couronne ===
Map of the Petite Couronne with Paris

Locator map showing the municipalities in which the Petite Couronne is divided. Paris is divided into its 20 arrondissements.

The Petite Couronne (literally "Little Crown", or inner ring) is formed by the three departments bordering Paris, forming a geographical crown around it. These departments, until 1968 part of the disbanded Seine department, are Hauts-de-Seine, Seine-Saint-Denis and Val-de-Marne. The most populated towns of the Petite Couronne are Boulogne-Billancourt, Montreuil, Saint-Denis, Nanterre and Créteil.

The Métropole du Grand Paris is an administrative structure that comprises Paris and the three departments of the Petite Couronne, plus seven additional communes in the Grande Couronne.

The table below shows some statistical information about the area including Paris:

Department	Area (km^{2})	Population (2011)	Municipalities
Paris (75)	105.4	2,249,975	1 (Paris)
Hauts-de-Seine (92)	176	1,581,628	36 (list)
Seine-Saint-Denis (93)	236	1,529,928	40 (list)
Val-de-Marne (94)	245	1,333,702	47 (list)
Petite Couronne	657	4,445,258	123
Paris + Petite Couronne	762.4	6,695,233	124

=== Grande Couronne ===
The Grande Couronne (literally Large Crown, or outer ring) includes the outer four departments of Île-de-France, which do not border Paris. They are Seine-et-Marne (77), Yvelines (78), Essonne (91) and Val-d'Oise (95). The last three departments formed the Seine-et-Oise department until it was disbanded in 1968. The city of Versailles is part of the area.

=== Historical population ===
Population of Île-de-France

Year	Pop.	±% p.a.
1801	1,352,280	—
1806	1,407,272	+0.80%
1821	1,549,811	+0.65%
1826	1,780,900	+2.82%
1831	1,707,181	−0.84%
1836	1,882,354	+1.97%
1841	1,998,862	+1.21%
1846	2,180,100	+1.75%
1851	2,239,695	+0.54%
1856	2,552,980	+2.65%
1861	2,819,045	+2.00%
1866	3,039,043	+1.51%
1872	3,141,730	+0.56%

Year	Pop.	±% p.a.
1876	3,320,162	+1.39%
1881	3,726,118	+2.33%
1886	3,934,314	+1.09%
1891	4,126,932	+0.96%
1896	4,368,656	+1.14%
1901	4,735,580	+1.63%
1906	4,960,310	+0.93%
1911	5,335,220	+1.47%
1921	5,682,598	+0.63%
1926	6,146,178	+1.58%
1931	6,705,579	+1.76%
1936	6,785,750	+0.24%
1946	6,597,758	−0.28%

Year	Pop.	±% p.a.
1954	7,317,063	+1.30%
1962	8,470,015	+1.85%
1968	9,248,631	+1.48%
1975	9,878,565	+0.95%
1982	10,073,059	+0.28%
1990	10,660,554	+0.71%
1999	10,952,011	+0.30%
2007	11,598,866	+0.72%
2012	11,898,502	+0.51%
2017	12,174,880	+0.46%
2019	12,262,544	+0.36%
2020	12,271,794	+0.08%

Census returns from INSEE

== International relations ==
=== Twin regions ===
Île-de-France is twinned with:

- Comunidad de Madrid in Spain (since 2000)
- Yerevan in Armenia (since 2011)
- Hanoi in Vietnam (since 2013)

== See also ==
- List of European Union regions by GDP
- Berlin/Brandenburg Metropolitan Region
- Kalos, a fictional region in the Pokémon franchise based on Île-de-France and surrounding provinces

== Bibliography ==
- Arbois de Jubainville, Henry; Dottin, George (1889). Les premiers habitants de l'Europe (in French). E. Thorin.
- Cunliffe, Barry (2004). Iron Age communities in Britain : an account of England, Scotland and Wales from the seventh century BC until the Roman conquest (4th ed.). London: Routledge. ISBN 978-0-415-34779-2.
- Fierro, Alfred (1996). Histoire et dictionnaire de Paris. Lafont. ISBN 978-0-7859-9300-1.
- Lawrence, Rachel; Gondrand, Fabienne (2010). Paris (City Guide) (12th ed.). London: Insight Guides. ISBN 978-981-282-079-2.
- Schmidt, Joël (2009). Lutèce: Paris, des origines à Clovis. Perrin. ISBN 978-2-262-03015-5.
- Bloch, Marc (1971). The Ile-de-France, the country around Paris. Cornell University Press. ISBN 0-8014-0640-4.
