= Kiran Vyas =

French Yoga instructor (born 1944)

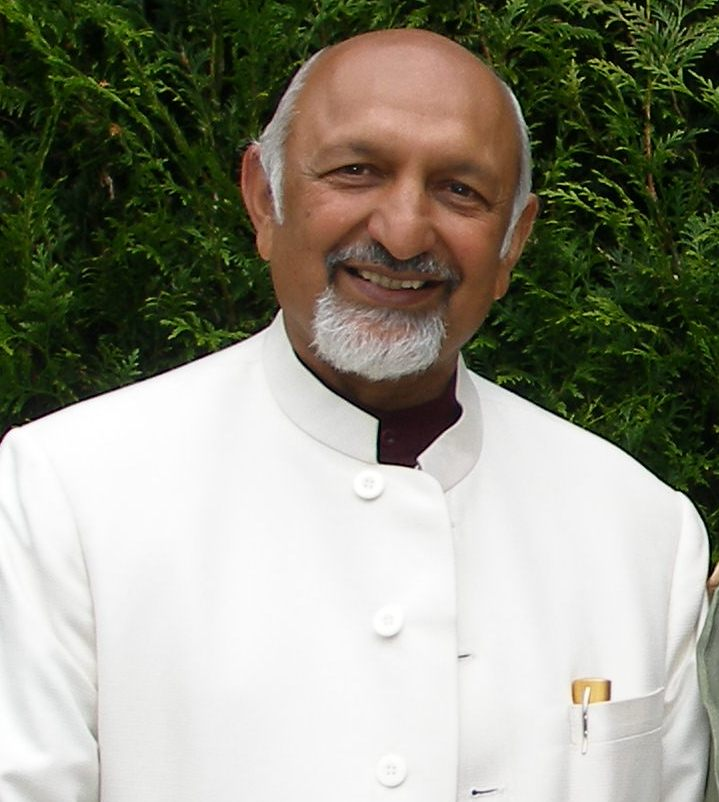
- Born: 31 March 1944 (age 81); Gujarat, India
- Occupation: Yoga instructor
- Known for: Yoga and Ayurveda teaching and promotion
- Awards: Padma Shri (2024)

Kiran Vyas (born 31 March 1944) is a French Yoga instructor and Ayurveda practitioner, known for his contributions to the field of Ayurveda in France. In the early 80s, when the practice was still relatively unknown, he introduced Ayurveda to the country.

== Life ==
Vyas was born on March 31, 1944, in Gujarat, India. He studied under notable people such as Sri Aurobindo and practiced Hatha Yoga with Shri Ambu. He founded the Tapovan Open University of Yoga and Ayurveda in France, where He advocates for a holistic approach to health that encompasses physical, mental, and spiritual well-being.

He has previously worked with UNESCO and several non-governmental organizations (NGOs) as a yoga instructor.

== Awards ==
In 2024, Kiran Vyas was presented with the Padma Shri Award by the Government of India for his contributions to the field of Yoga, presented by the President of India, Droupadi Murmu.
