= Sujata Bajaj =

Indian Abstract painter (born 1958)

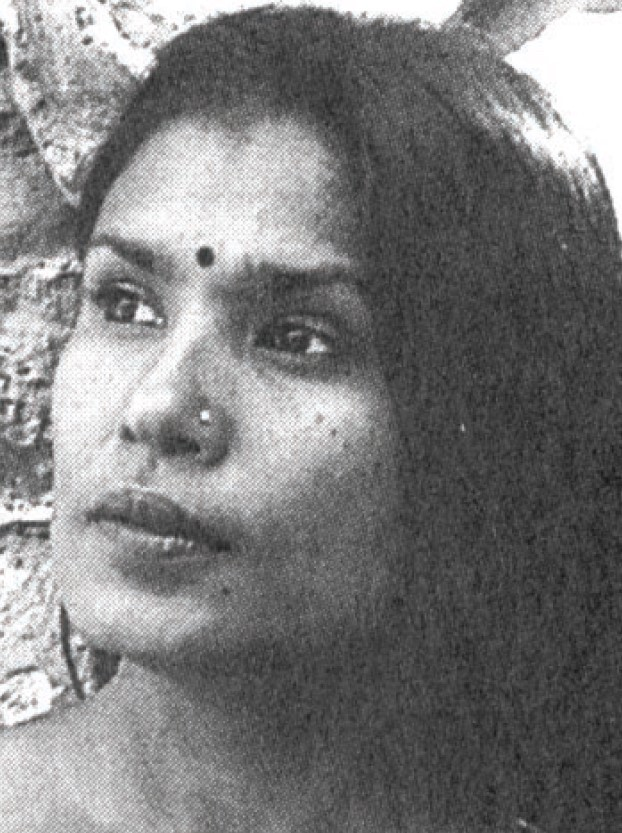
- Born: 1958 (age 67–68); Jaipur, India
- Education: The Macrobert Arts Centre
- Known for: Visual Arts, Drawing, Abstract painting
- Awards: French Government Scholarship, 1988-1989
- Website: http://sujata-bajaj.com/

Sujata Bajaj (born 1958, in Jaipur) is an Indian painter, best known for her work in Indian tribal art. A graduate of the Beaux-Arts de Paris, her work has been displayed at the Lalit Kala Akademi, the Triveni Kala Sangam, the Jehangir Art Gallery, the Kunsthall Stavanger, the Casa de Noruega, and the Macrobert Arts Centre between 1978 and 2001.

== Life ==
Sujata Bajaj is the daughter of Anasuyaji and Radhakrishnaji Bajaj and was close to Mahatma Gandhi and Vinoba Bhave. She was raised in Jaipur and attended graduate school in Pune. She has a degree in fine arts in Indian tribal art and graduated from the École des Beaux-Arts de Paris. She has been living in Paris since 1988.

She is married to Rune Jul Larsen and has a daughter, Helena Bajaj-Larsen.

== Exhibitions ==
Solo Exhibitions in India
Year	Location
1978	Bal Gandharva Art Gallery, Pune
1979	Jehangir Art Gallery, Mumbai
1979	Kamalnayan Bajaj Art Gallery, Mumbai
1980	Bal Gandharva Art Gallery, Pune
1980	Jehangir Art Gallery, Mumbai
1982	Academy of Fine Arts, Kolkata
1982	Bal Gandharva Art Gallery, Pune
1984	Bal Gandharva Art Gallery, Pune
1984	Jehangir Art Gallery, Mumbai
1985	Bal Gandharva Art Gallery, Pune
1985	Triveni Kala Sangam, New Delhi
1986	Taj Art Gallery, Mumbai
1987	Bal Gandharva Art Gallery, Pune
1987	Kamalnayan Bajaj Art Gallery, Mumbai
1987	Karnataka Chitra Kala Parishath, Bangalore
1988	Sarala's Art Centre, Chennai
1989	Jehangir Art Gallery, Mumbai
1991	Birla Academy, Kolkata
1991	The Gallery, Chennai
1992	Jehangir Art Gallery, Mumbai
1993	The Gallery, Chennai
1995	The Gallery, Chennai
1995	Triveni Kala Sangam, New Delhi
1996	Jehangir Art Gallery, Mumbai
2000	Jehangir Art Gallery, Mumbai

Other Exhibitions in India
Year	Location	Title
1989	Lalit Kala Galleries, New Delhi	Indian Eclectics
1993	Lalit Kala Galleries, New Delhi	Souvenirs from France

Solo Exhibitions Worldwide
Year	Location
1988	Commonwealth Art Gallery, Edinburgh, U.K
1988	Macrobert Art Centre, University of Stirling, U.K
1988	American Cultural Society, Washington, U.S.A
1989	Centre for Near Eastern Students, Paris, France
1989	Jean Louis Voisin Gallery, Pourville-sur-Mer, France
1989	Bernanos Gallery, Ministry of National Education, Paris, France
1991	Christine Marquet de Vasselot Gallery, Paris, France
1992	Art & Data Gallery, Frankfurt, Germany
1993	Norway House, Paris, France
1993	Art & Data Gallery, Frankfurt, Germany
1993	Gallery Nordstrand, Oslo, Norway
1994	Clay Gallery, Brussels, Belgium
1994	Christine Marquet de Vasselot Gallery, Paris, France
1995	Art & Data Gallery, Frankfurt, Germany
1997	Gallery Nordstrand, Oslo, Norway
1998	Mohanjeet Gallery, Paris, France
1998	Gallery Akern, Kongsberg, Norway
1999	Stavanger Art Association, Norway
1999	Atlantic Gallery, New York, USA
2000	Gallery Nordstrand, Oslo, Norway
2000	Galleri & Atelier Varatun Gård, Sandnes, Norway
2001	Gallery Tendenes

Other Exhibitions Worldwide
Year	Location	Title
1988	Tarbes, France	The Exhibition of Contemporary Indian Painting
1989	École nationale supérieure des Beaux-Arts, Paris	Gallery of the House of Fine Arts
1989	Galerie du Cygne, Paris	Indian Artists in Paris
1989	Neufchâtel-en-Bray, France	Art en Bray Fair
1989	Galerie Bernanos, Paris	The Egalitarian Plural Society
1989	C.I.U.P, Paris	Nine Artists of the Cité Universitaire
1989	Grand Palais, Paris	May Salon
1990	Neufchâtel-en-Bray, France	Salon Art en Bray
1991	Neufchâtel-en-Bray, France	Salon Art en Bray
1991	USA	New York Art Fair
1991	Rouen, France	Normandy Independent Fair
1992	Galleri Bryggen, Bergen, Norway	
1992	Christine Marquet de Vasselot Gallery, Paris	
1992	University of Frankfurt, Germany	
1992	Grand Palais, Paris	Discovery Lounge
1993	Grand Palais, Paris	Contemporary
1994	Frankfurt, Germany	Ausstellung Indische Kunst
1995	Paris	UNESCO
1996	Within the Frame Visual Art Centre, Hong Kong	
1998	Hong Kong	50 Years of Independence
1998	Hong Kong	Indian Spring
