= Indians in France =

Indians in France Indiens en France
Total population
- 119,000 (Metropolitan France)

Regions with significant populations
- Paris, Overseas France, French Alps

Languages
- Bengali, English, Mauritian Creole, Bhojpuri, Gujarati, French, Hindi, Urdu, Seychellois Creole, Konkani, Malayalam, Punjabi, Tamil, Réunion Creole, Sindhi, Antillean Creole, Marathi, Telugu, Guianese Creole, Malagasy and several other Indian languages

Religion
- Predominantly: Hinduism; Minority: Sikhism, Islam, Catholicism, Protestantism, Jainism, Buddhism, Zoroastrianism, Ravidassia

Related ethnic groups
- Non-resident Indian and Person of Indian Origin, Indians in Germany, Indians in Switzerland, Indians in Italy, British Indians, South Asians in Ireland, Mauritian diaspora in France (Mauritians of Indian origin)

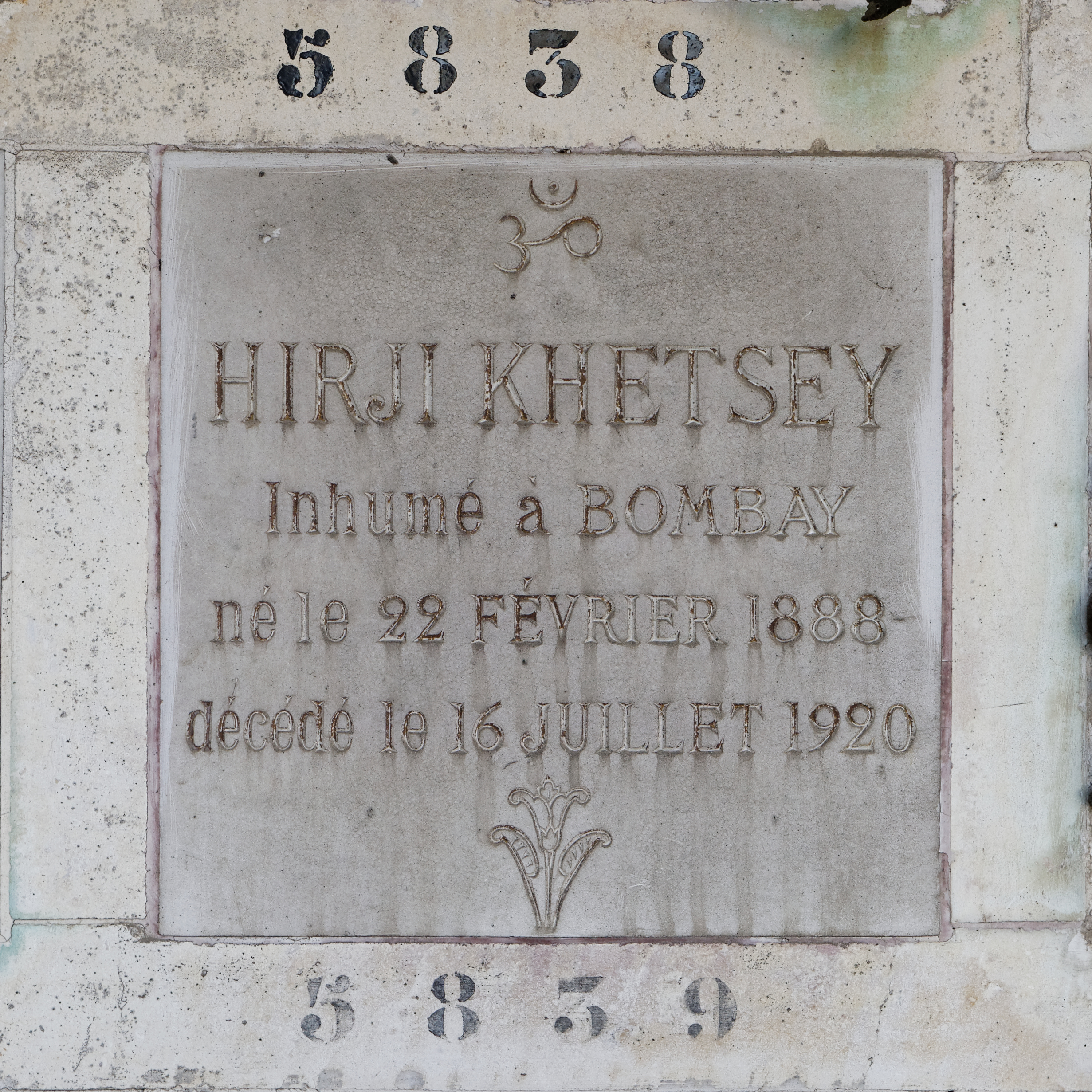
Hindu grave in the columbarium of Père Lachaise

Indo-French people or Indians in France are residents from India in France, as well as people of Indian national origin. According to the Indian Ministry of External Affairs, there are an estimated 119,000 overseas Indians living in metropolitan France, in addition to 367,379 in the French overseas departments and regions of Guadeloupe, Réunion, Martinique and French Guiana.

== History ==
A majority of France's minority ethnic Indian community originate from Chandernagore of West Bengal and the Union territory of Pondicherry, the two former French colonies in India, mostly comprising Bengalis (from Chandannagar), Tamils, Malayalis as well as Telugus (from Puducherry).

The Indo-French population also includes a significant number of twice-migrant communities. These include Mauritian Indians (Biharis, Tamils, Telugus and Marathis), Indo-Guadeloupeans, Indo-Martinicans, and communities from the Seychelles (Tamils, Gujaratis and Biharis), Réunion (Malbars and Zarabes), French Guiana, and Madagascar (mostly Gujaratis). Additionally, it comprises 'repatriates' (locally known as « rapatriés ») from former French Indochina and other decolonized French territories.

Later immigrants to mainland France were drawn mostly from Gujarati, Sindhi, Konkani, and Punjabi backgrounds, with a subsequent wave of Keralites from the state of Kerala. Student and professional mobility also produced a local, diverse, and growing Indian NRI community.

== Notable people ==
- Severus of Vienne
- Jeanne Dupleix
- Catherine Boudet
- J. R. D. Tata
- Hidayat Inayat Khan
- S. H. Raza
- Sakti Burman
- Prithwindra Mukherjee
- Paris Viswanathan
- Vasant Rai
- Ananda Devi
- Anju Chaudhuri
- Kiran Vyas
- Subrata K. Mitra
- Vijay Singh
- Ivan Grésèque
- Partha Pratim Majumder
- Sujata Bajaj
- Chetan Eknath Chitnis
- Romuald Karmakar
- Maya Burman
- Shumona Sinha
- Vikash Dhorasoo
- Cynthia Brown
- Nalini Anantharaman
- Nalini Balbir
- Nathacha Appanah
- Indila
- Aurore Kichenin
- Ashley Radjarame

== See also ==
- Asian diasporas in France
- Réunionnais of Indian origin
- Immigration to France
- Indian diaspora
- Indians in Guadeloupe
- Indo-Martinicans
- Indians in French Guiana
- Tamils in France
- France–India relations
- Romani people in France
- French people in India
