= Spanish immigration to France =

French people of Spanish origin
Total population
- Spanish ancestry c. 4,000,000 to 5,000,000 (by ancestry, about 5 to 6% of the total French population); Residents of France born in Spain; 320,749 (2025) Spanish-born

Regions with significant populations
- Paris (metropolitan area), Toulouse, Lyon, Marseille, Nice, Bordeaux, Île-de-France, Nouvelle-Aquitaine, Occitania, Brittany, Corsica, Centre-Val de Loire, Pays de la Loire, Normandy, Provence-Alpes-Côte d'Azur

Languages
- French; Spanish

Religion
- Roman Catholicism

Related ethnic groups
- Italian; Portuguese; Spanish immigration to Switzerland

Spaniards in France are people from Spain residing in France and their descendants. They may be French citizens or non-citizen immigrants or expatriates.

Spanish immigration to France began from ancient times up to the present time and the French Republic is the second largest Spanish community outside Spain. The Spanish arrived mainly attracted by the job and new lifestyles, as well due to conflicts and armed movements in Spain which prompted the Spanish to emigrate to France. Of these, according to the census of 2021 in Spain, 279,988 reside in the French Republic.

== Demographics ==
The 2012 Census recorded 198,182 Spanish-born people.

Year	Spanish-born population	Other data	Foreigners	Migrants	Inflow
1999	144,039	160,000			
2005	307,012				
2006	300,019				
2007	295,860	262,000 131,000			
2008	290,285	257,000			
2009		179.678			
2010		183,277			
2011		189,909	129,087	245,013	
2012		198,182			5,687
2013		206,589			
2014		215,183			
2015		223,636			
2016		232,693			
2017		243,582			
2018		253,036			
2020		273,290			
2021		279,988			
2022		297,142			
2024		310,072			
2025		320,749			

== See also ==
- France–Spain relations
- Spanish diaspora
- Spanish immigration to Germany
