= Chinese community in Paris =

Community in France

The Olympiades towers with the pagoda roof shopping centre, Olympiades Chinatown, Paris

As of 1990, the majority of Asians living in the Paris area were ethnic Chinese originating from several countries. As of 1998 the largest group included ethnic Chinese from Indochina, and a smaller group originated from Zhejiang.

== History ==
During World War I, the French brought workers from Zhejiang to work in the war effort. When the war ended, several thousand remained, most of whom originated from Qingtian, while most of the imported Chinese workers went back to China. These Chinese worked as stall-holders in fairgrounds.

In the 1920s, a community of Chinese students lived in Paris. Many of them became politically active and participated in the 'Diligent Work-Frugal Study Movement'. Zhou Enlai and Deng Xiaoping lived in a flat near Place d'Italie. In 1921, they published Youth, a Chinese-language newspaper, from this flat.

A group of Chinese from Wenzhou, Zhejiang settled in Paris in the 1930s. According to the 1936 Census, slightly more than 2,000 Chinese lived in Paris.

As of the 1930s, the Chinese population included employees of French companies, including workers in leather shops and factories such as those owned by Renault. Other Chinese included artisans and tradespeople. From the end of World War II onwards, more Chinese from Zhejiang arrived, a substantial number of whom later engaged in the manufacturing and wholesale business of leather products.

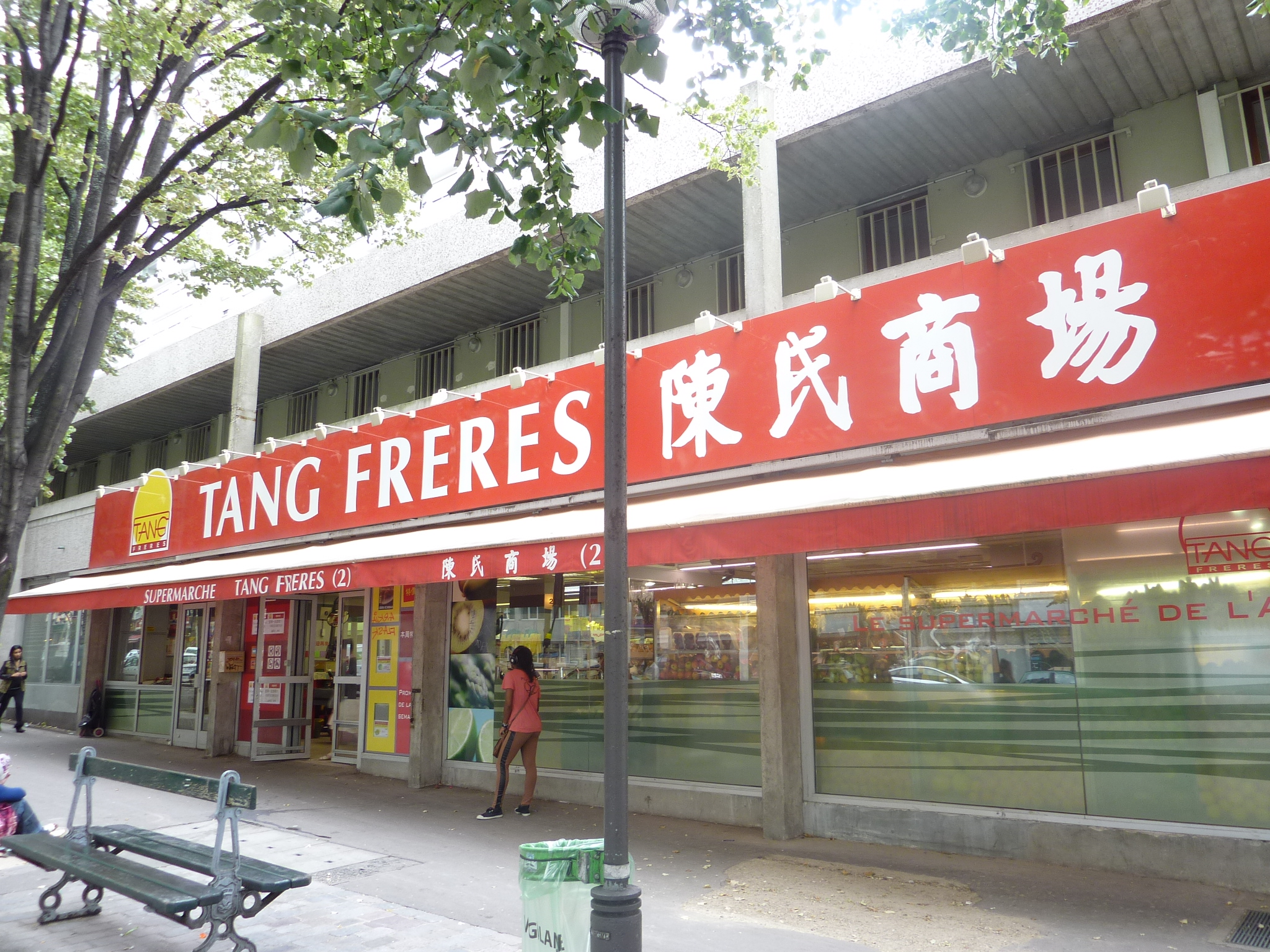
Tang Frères (陳氏商場 Chénshì Shāngchǎng) supermarket in the 13th arrondissement of Paris

Michelle Guillon, author of "The Chinese and Chinese Districts in Paris", wrote that "before 1975" the Chinese in Paris "were not perceived as immigrants but rather as a little group that added a touch of exoticism to the capital, thanks to their restaurants in the Latin Quarter."

Immigrants from Cambodia and Vietnam had arrived in Paris since the colonial era but had arrived in the largest numbers post-1975. Guillon wrote that there was a likelihood of "many members of the Chinese minorities (Cantonese and Teochew) among these refugees" and that these refugees had been persecuted in Laos and Vietnam in the 1970s, but "it is impossible to work out any count on the criteria of legal nationality" since they had stayed in Laos and Vietnam and had taken Laotian and Vietnamese nationalities many years prior.

The French dispersed refugees so they would not join communities where foreigners were already settled, and the government set up many shelter and lodging centres in central and western France. However the ethnic Chinese from Cambodia, Laos, and Vietnam banded together after leaving the shelter and lodging centres and settled in Paris. Later groups of ethnic Chinese Indochinese immediately went to Paris after arriving at Charles de Gaulle Airport.

Ethnic Chinese Indochinese families living in provincial French cities felt isolation. They moved to Paris as ethnic Chinese companies opened there. In the 1980s, additional Chinese from Zhejiang arrived.

In 1998, Guillon wrote that the Chinese now were "a constituent part of the Parisian population."

In 2011, several muggings assaults on ethnic Chinese occurred in the 20th arrondissement of Paris, causing ethnic Chinese to hold demonstrations against violence. David Chazan of the BBC wrote that they are perceived as being prosperous and therefore are targeted.

In 2016, protests staged by ethnic Chinese occurred after several Chinese in Aubervilliers were attacked. The Franco-Chinese Friendship Association stated that from November 2015 to August 2016 over 100 ethnic Chinese in Aubervilliers had been robbed. 49-year old Chaoling Zhang (张朝林 Zhāng Cháolín), beaten in a robbery, died on 16 August 2016.

== Demographics ==
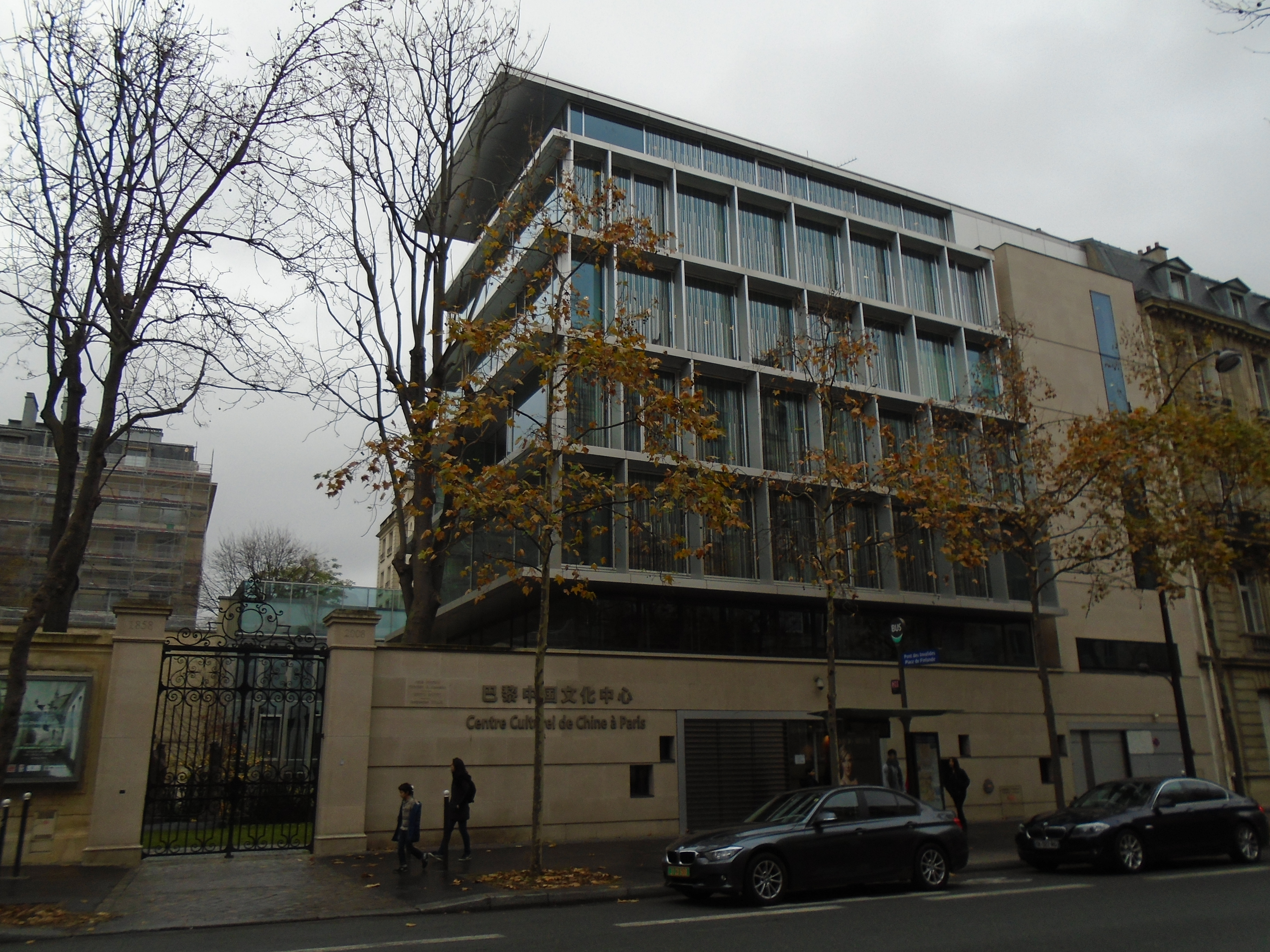
China Cultural Center in Paris (Centre culturel de Chine à Paris, 巴黎中国文化中心)

As of 1990, in the City of Paris there were 7,590 Chinese citizens and 1,272 former Chinese citizens naturalized as French. The combined total was 8,862. During that year, in the City of Paris there were 128 Taiwanese citizens and 36 former Taiwanese citizens naturalized as French, making a combined total of 164.

As of 1990, in the Île-de-France region there were 11,263 Chinese citizens and 2,564 former Chinese citizens naturalized as French, making a combined total of 13,827. During that year, there were 248 Taiwanese citizens in the region and 80 former Taiwanese naturalized as French, making a combined total of 328.

As of 1998 the ethnic Chinese population includes those who were born in Cambodia. Guillon wrote that due to integration of ethnic Chinese into Cambodian society, the Chinese adoption of Khmer names, and intermarriage between Chinese and Khmer, there is difficulty in differentiating between Chinese and Khmer people in Paris. Guillon wrote that Chineseness became re-emphasized in these Cambodian-born Chinese due to the nature of their exile from Cambodia.

== Geography ==
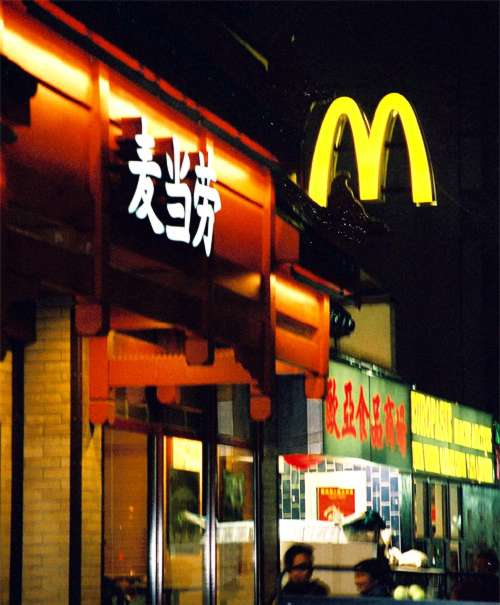
McDonald's in the Paris Chinatown in Choisy

The areas of Chinese settlement include the Porte de Choisy area in the 13th arrondissement (the Paris Chinatown), the Belleville area in northeast Paris, and the Temple and Arts-et-Metiers area, which is mostly in the 3rd arrondissement but also has portions in the southern 10th arrondissement and the western 11th arrondissement; this area, in the historical centre of Paris, is in proximity to the Centre National d'Art Contemporain Georges Pompidou. The Parisian public perceives the Porte de Choisy and Belleville areas as being the major Chinatowns. The area with the highest proportion of Asians is the Temple/Arts-et-Metiers area.

7,000 Asians live in the Choisy area. Major banks of China such as the Bank of China and the International Commercial Bank of China, as of 1998, have operations in this area.

As of 1998, Belleville has the largest Chinese restaurants in area in Paris.

As of 1998, 8,000 Asians live in the Temple/Arts-et-Metiers area, making up about 4-9% of the population. The main Asian group is the Wenzhou people. 70-90% of the residents, of 1998, had or once had Chinese citizenship.

Ethnic Chinese from Wenzhou began arriving in Aubervilliers in the 1980s and 1990s to participate in the textile industry. As of 2016 4,000 ethnic Chinese live in Aubervilliers.

As of 1998, most Asians living in Marne-la-Vallée are Chinese. They had previously lived in Paris but moved to Marne-la-Vallée to get an increased quality of life. The residents of this area do ethnic shopping in Paris, and there are few ethnic shops and businesses in Marne-la-Vallée.

== In popular culture ==
Marinette Dupain-Cheng, the female protagonist of the animated television series Miraculous: Tales of Ladybug & Cat Noir, is a French-Chinese student with the secret superhero identity of Ladybug.

== Notable people ==
- Anne Cheng, academic
- François Cheng, academic
- Lucie Zhang, actress

== See also ==
- Demographics of Paris
- Japanese community of Paris
- Chinese diaspora in France
- Vietnamese community in Paris
- Chinese in Paris
