= Sri Lankans in France =

Total population
- 52,300 (2017)

Languages
- English · Sinhalese · Tamil · French

Religion
- Buddhism · Hinduism · Islam · Catholicism

Related ethnic groups
- Sri Lankan people · British Sri Lankans

Sri Lankans in France refer to residents and citizens of Sri Lankan ancestry, who were born in or immigrated to France legally and illegally. The estimated population of Sri Lankans in France is 52,300.

== History ==
Although most of immigration from Sri Lanka started during the Sri Lankan Civil War, there have been a presence of Sri Lankans in France since the early 20th century since the times of Ceylon. Ceylonese in high positions often went to Europe to study, tour and visit, mostly in England, but also France such as that of Sir John Kotelawala. There have been Ceylonese who fought alongside the British on the Western Front (areas of present-day Belgium, France and Luxembourg) during WW1.

Since the Sri Lankan Civil War the issue of illegal Sri Lankan immigration is a topic of concern for France.

== Demographics ==
The Sri Lankan population in France is estimated at approximately 52,300. However, the actual number is difficult to ascertain since statistics by ethnicity or religious denomination are prohibited in France.

== Organisations ==
The Sri Lankan Diaspora have created a number of associations which organise Sri Lankan festivals, cultural functions and sports events for the Sri Lankan community.

== Notable people ==
- Antonythasan Jesuthasan
- Sirima
- Tampalawela Dhammaratana

== See also ==
- Asian diasporas in France
- Sri Lankan diaspora
- Immigration to France
