= Malagasy people in France =

Malagasy migrants in France

Total population
- 25,000 - 50,000

Regions with significant populations
- Réunion, Mayotte

Languages
- Malagasy, French

Religion
- Roman Catholicism, Protestantism Islam

Related ethnic groups
- Merina, Betsimsarika

Malagasy people in France consist of migrants from Madagascar and their descendants living and working in France.

== History ==
The first wave of immigrants from Madagascar who came in France were soldiers recruited as colonial troops into the French Armed Forces to fight in the World Wars. After 1947, some Malagasy nationalist students came to study in parts of Europe and Asia The second wave of immigrants began in 1975, because of the political instability in Madagascar. The third wave, which began in 1990s, is composed mostly of economic migrants.

== Notable people ==
- Tessah Andrianjafitrimo
- Franck Béria
- Enzo Bovis
- Jérémy Morel
- OBOY
- Jean-Jacques Razafindranazy
- Nicolas Senzemba
- Shurik'n
- Benoit Tremoulinas
- Ludovic Ajorque
- Yoël Armougom
- Romain Métanire
- Jain

== See also ==
- France–Madagascar relations
