= Mauritian diaspora in France =

Mauritians in France
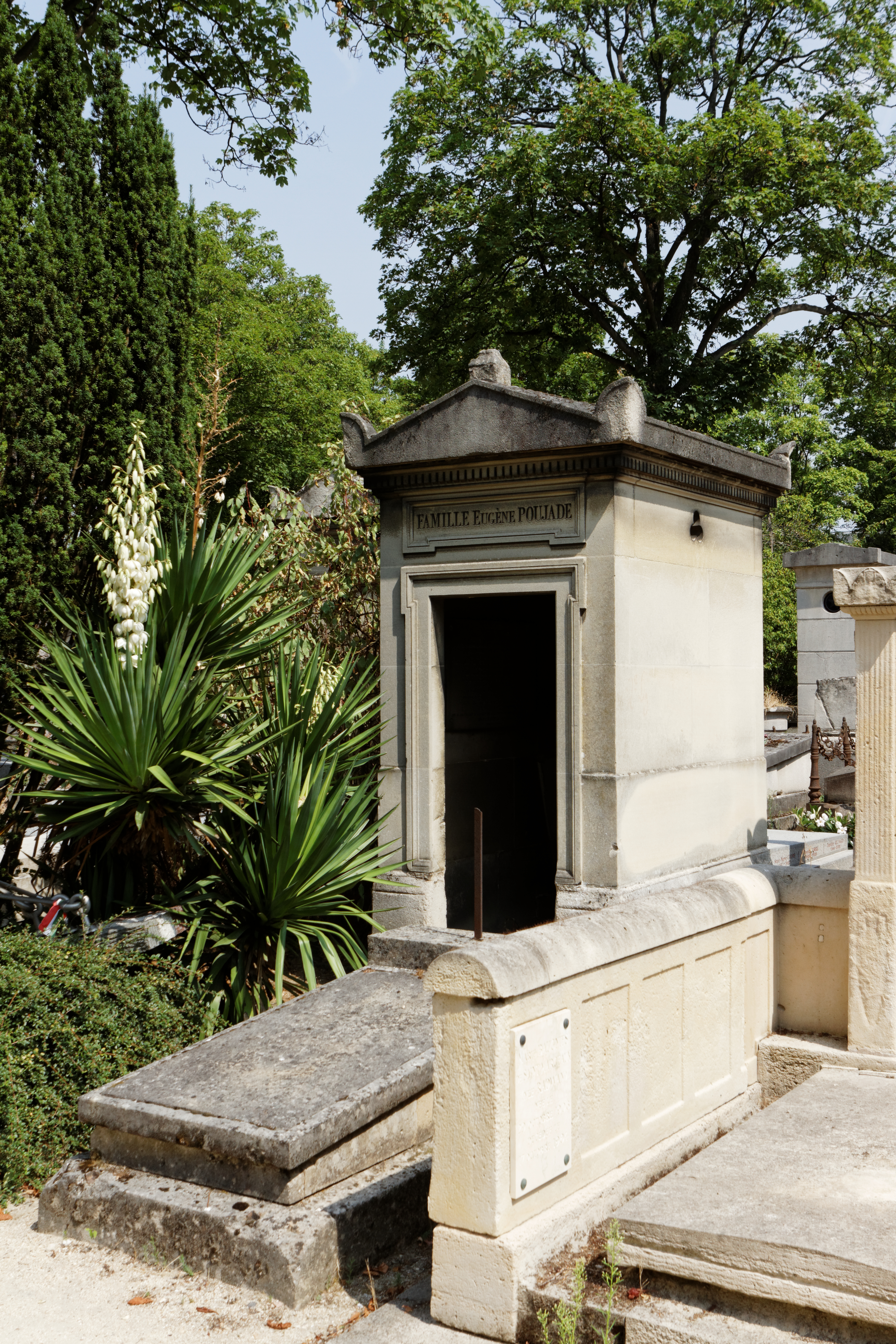
- Grave of Eugene Poujade (1815, Port Louis – 1885, Paris), Père-Lachaise Cemetery

Total population
- 18,840

Regions with significant populations
- Paris

Languages
- French, Mauritian Creole, Mauritian Bhojpuri, Hindustani (Hindi-Urdu), Marathi, Tamil, Telugu and English

Religion
- Christianity mainly Roman Catholicism, Hinduism mainly Sanatan Dharm and Sunni Islam

Related ethnic groups
- Indian diaspora in France, Mixed Mauritians, Black people in France

Mauritian diaspora in France are French people with Mauritian descent, or who were born in Mauritius. Although for its economic stability, Australia, New Zealand, United Kingdom and Ireland are the biggest recipients of Mauritian immigration; Mauritius is part of the Commonwealth of Nations.

== Notable individuals ==
- Nathacha Appanah, French author
- Lindsay Rose, French footballer
- Kévin Bru, French footballer
- Jonathan Bru, French footballer
- Michael Bosqui, French footballer
- Enzo Couacaud, French tennis player
- Vikash Dhorasoo, French footballer
- Angelo Gopée, CEO of Live Nation France
- Ethann Isidore, French actor
- Gustave Kervern, French actor and director
- J. M. G. Le Clézio, French writer
- Joël de Rosnay, French scientist
- Prisca Thévenot, French politician
- Jérémy Villeneuve, French footballer
- Jonathan Justin, French footballer
- Arassen Ragaven, French footballer
- Sébastien Monier, French footballer
- Wesley Saïd, French footballer
- Rosario Latouchent, French footballer
- Jean-Raymond Boulle, Mining Magnate, Conservationist
- Adam Siao Him Fa, French figure skater

== See also ==
- Mauritians
- Mauritian diaspora in the United Kingdom
- Mauritian Australians
- Alix d'Unienville, secret agent
