= Cameroonians in France =

Camerounais en France (French)

Total population
- 90,000

Regions with significant populations
- Paris, Marseille

Languages
- Fanji, Jagham, Basaa, Medumba, French, English

Religion
- Christianity (majority); Islam (minority)

Cameroonians in France consist of migrants from Cameroon and their descendants living and working in France.

== History ==
The first Cameroonian immigrants in France came in the 1970s, like the Congolese, some years after the first immigrant wave from Sub-Saharan Africa (Senegal Valley) to France. This immigration has sped up in the 1980s (due to the social and economic crisis in Cameroon)

== Notable people ==
- Dieudonné comedian
- Samuel Umtiti, professional footballer
- Françoise Mbango Etone, track and field athlete
- Kylian Mbappé, professional footballer
- Griedge Mbock Bathy, professional footballer
- Gévrise Émane, judoka
- Véronique Mang, track and field athlete
- Bryan Mbeumo, professional footballer
- Loïc Mbe Soh, professional footballer
- Francis Ngannou, mixed martial artist
- Dany Bill, kickboxer
- Teddy Tamgho, track and field athlete
- Calixthe Beyala, writer
- Emil Abossolo-Mbo, actor
- Vencelas Dabaya, weightlifter
- Serge Betsen, rugby union player
- Hassan N'Dam N'Jikam, professional boxer
- Antoinette Nana Djimou, heptathlete, pentathlete
- Cedric Doumbe, kickboxer and MMA fighter
- Patrick Mboma, professional footballer
- Carlos Takam, professional boxer
- Gaëlle Nayo-Ketchanke, weightlifter
- Benoît Assou-Ekotto, professional footballer
- Adolphe Teikeu, professional footballer
- Zacharie Noah, former professional footballer
- Yannick Noah, singer and tennis player
- Joakim Noah, basketball player
- William Saliba, professional footballer
- Hugo Ekitike, professional footballer
- Christian M'billi, professional boxer
