= British migration to France =

British citizens in France Citoyens britanniques en France
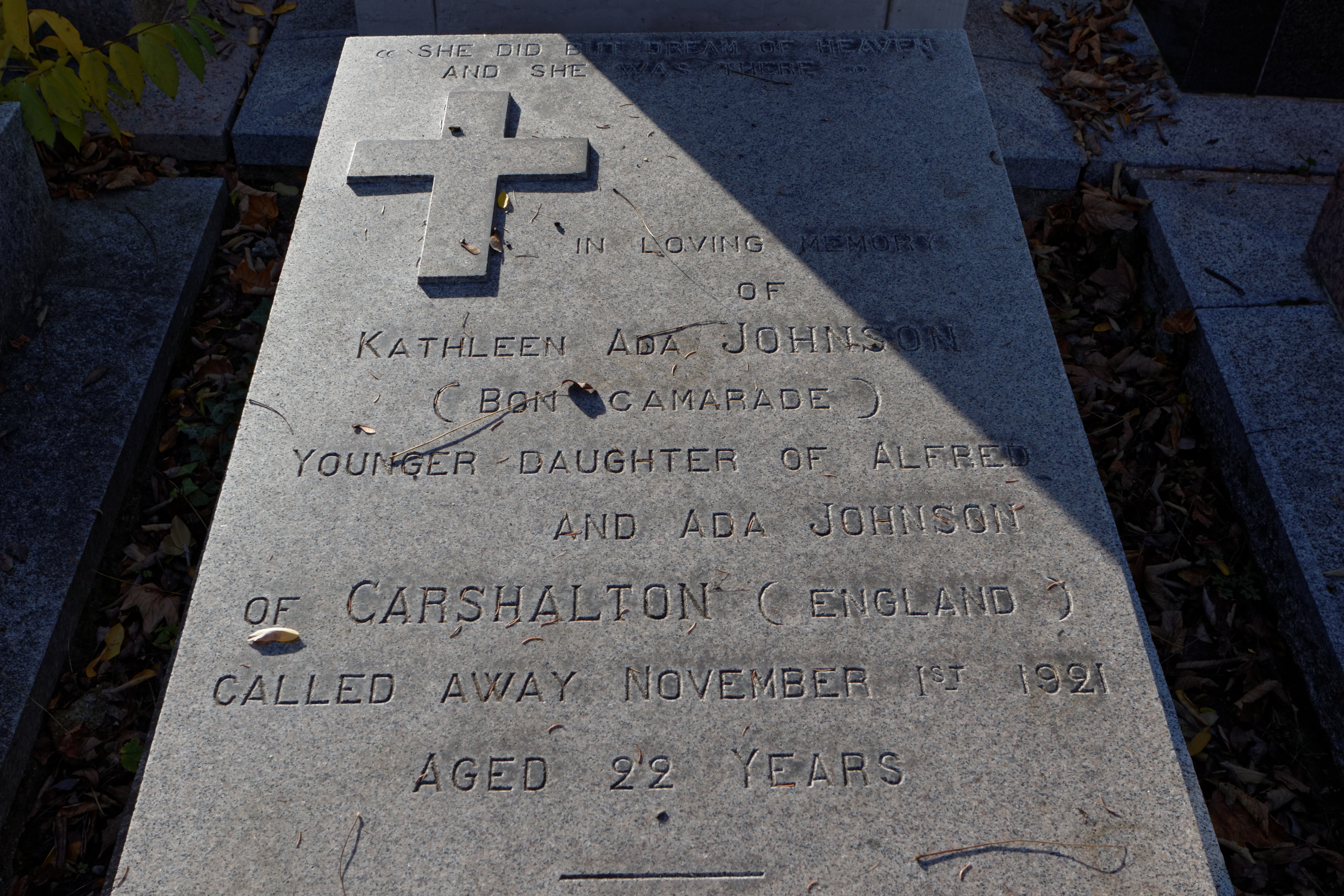
- Grave of Kathleen Johnson of Carshalton, Père-Lachaise Cemetery

Total population
- 261,000 - 400,000

Regions with significant populations
- Aquitaine, Languedoc-Roussillon, Midi-Pyrénées, Brittany, Poitou-Charentes, Corsica, Centre-Val de Loire, Limousin, Pays de la Loire, Lower Normandy, Provence-Alpes-Côte d'Azur, Alsace (particularly Strasbourg), French Alps

Languages
- French, English

Religion
- Anglicanism, Protestantism, Irreligion, Catholicism

Related ethnic groups
- Britons

British migration to France has resulted in France being home to one of the largest British-born populations outside the United Kingdom. Migration from the UK to France has increased rapidly from the 1990s onwards. Estimates of the number of British citizens living in France vary from 261,000 to 400,000. Besides Paris, many British expatriates tend to be concentrated in the regions of southern France, Brittany, and recently the island of Corsica. Dordogne has a large British immigrant community. The region has between 5,000 and 10,000 British residents and 800 British entrepreneurs, drawn by the French lifestyle and warmer climate in the south.

== Demographics ==
=== Population size ===
There are conflicting estimates of the size of the British community in France. Estimates range from 261,000 to 400,000. The main destinations of British migration to France apart from Paris are rural areas of France and the southern areas of the country. The major regions chosen by this community are Nouvelle-Aquitaine, Occitanie, Brittany and Corsica. In Eymet, Dordogne, British immigrants account for a third of the local population, and in Saint-Nom-la-Bretèche and l'Etang-la-Ville in the Yvelines department near Paris, are a large proportion of UK nationals.

=== Population distribution ===
According to the data collected, the distribution of Britons (the numerical figure is probably double that) in France was as follows:

Location	Population
Nouvelle-Aquitaine	40,000
Occitania (administrative region)	25,000
Provence-Alpes-Côte d'Azur	25,000
Île-de-France	18,000
Auvergne-Rhône-Alpes	15,000
Brittany (administrative region)	12,600
Normandy	7,500
Pays de la Loire	7,004
Corse	4,400
Centre-Val de Loire	3,000
Grand Est	2,000
Bourgogne-Franche-Comté	2,000
Hauts-de-France	2,000

== Today ==
In 2021, since the United Kingdom left the European Union, 100,000 residence permits have been granted to Britons in France. By the end of October 2021, more than 165,400 applications for residence permits had been submitted by British citizens in France.

In 2014, the National Statistics Institute (INSEE, for its acronym in French) published a study, reporting that there are double the number of British immigrants, this increase having resulted from the euro area crisis; as a result, this has driven up the number of Europeans living in France. The number of British immigrants in France increased by 50% between 2009 and 2012.

Other European immigrants in France: Portuguese 8%, British 5%, Spanish 5%, Italians 4%, Germans 4%, Romanians 3%, Belgians 3%. Displaced workers of Europe in France are: Poles (18% of the total), followed by the Portuguese people (15%) and Romanians (13%).

== Notable people ==
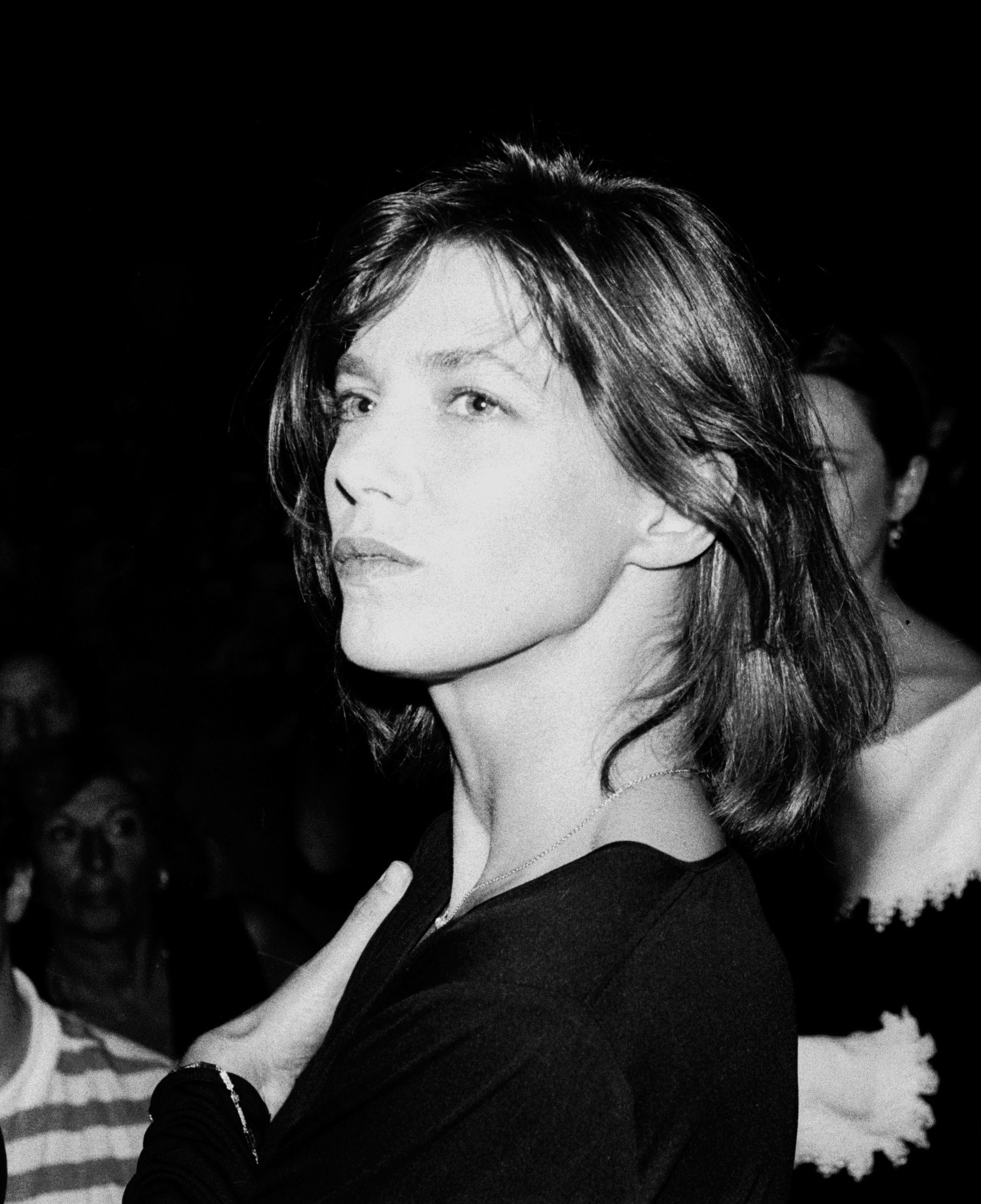
Jane Birkin

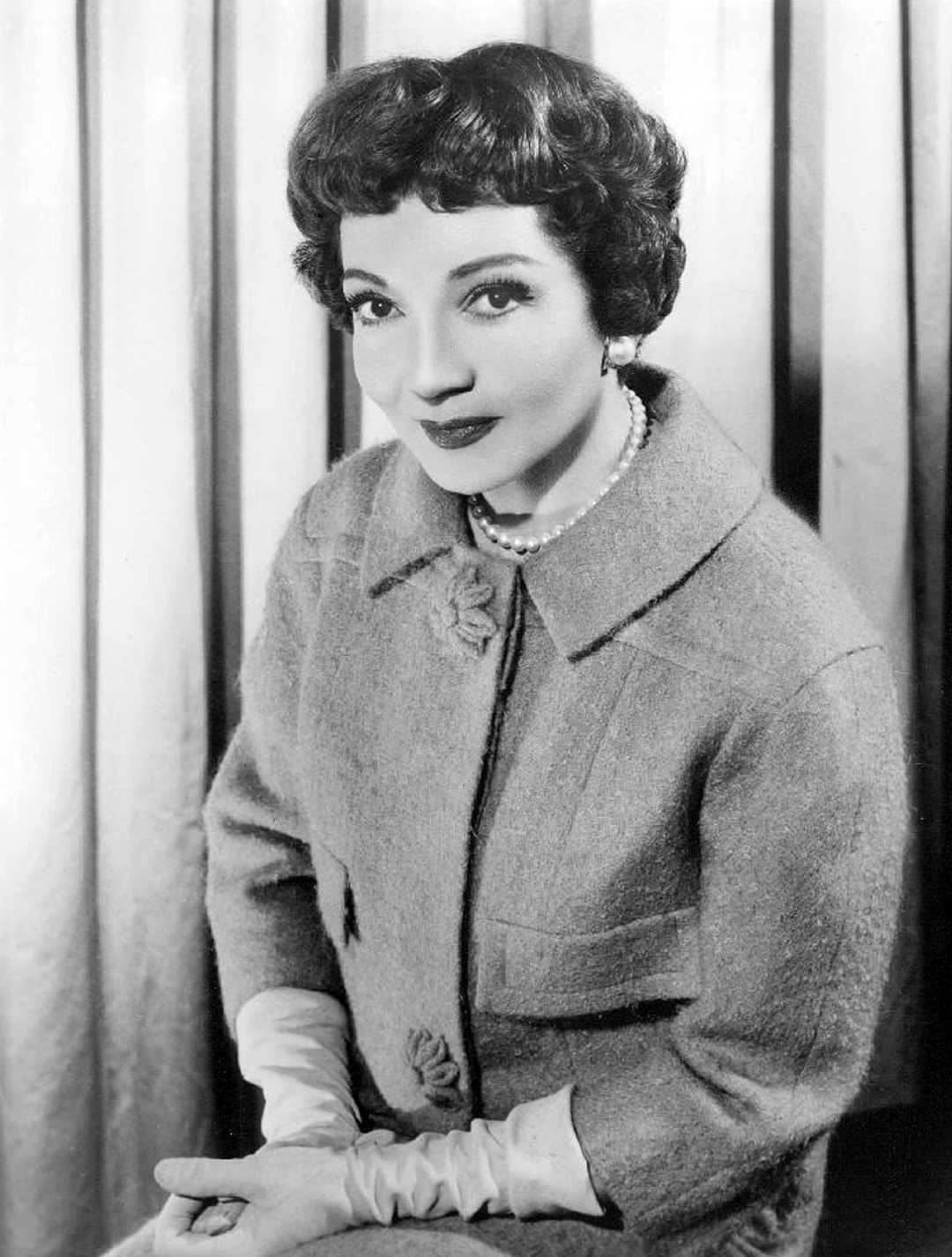
Claudette Colbert

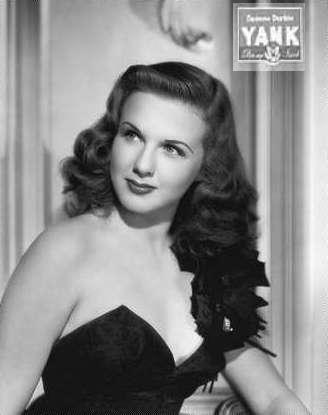
Deanna Durbin

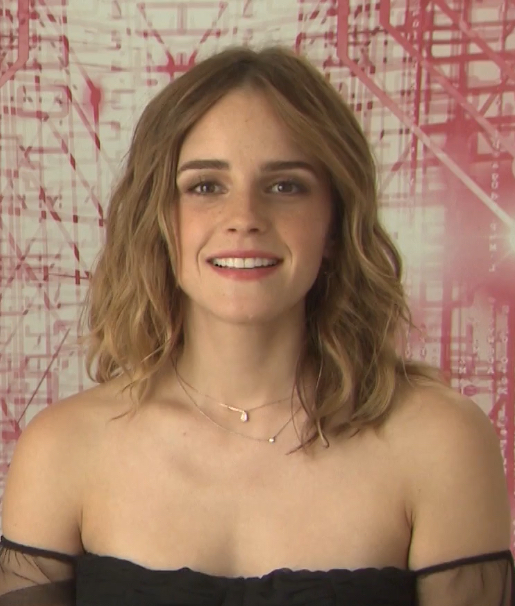
Emma Watson

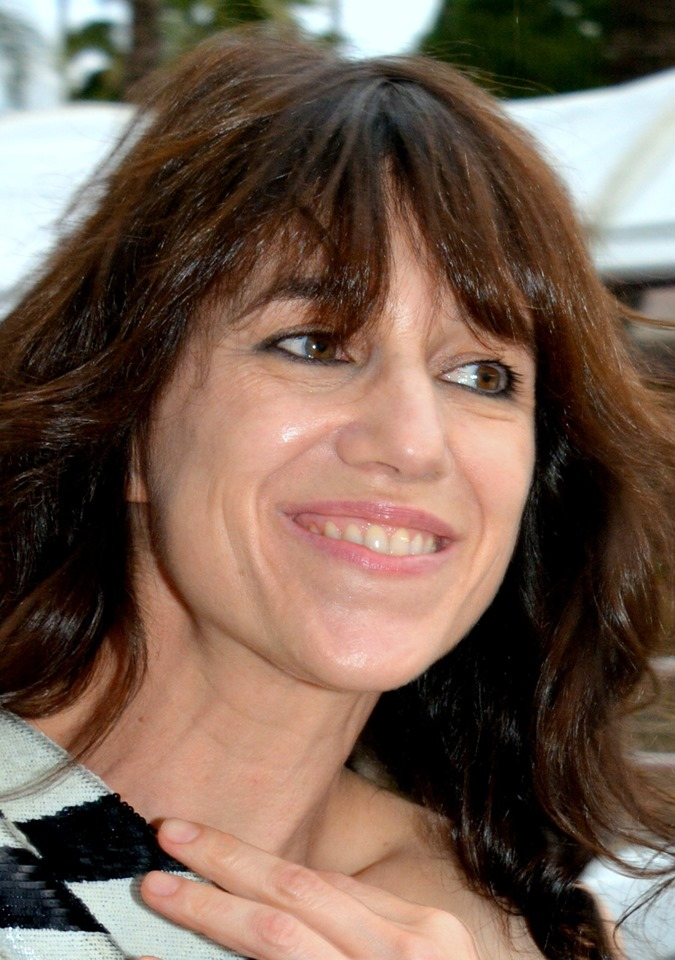
Charlotte Gainsbourg

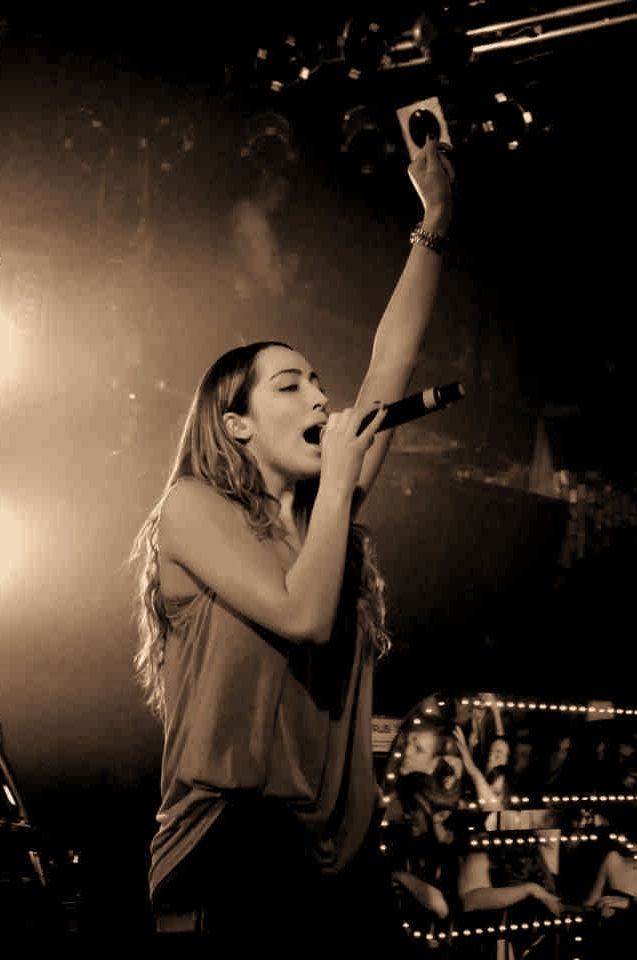
Delilah

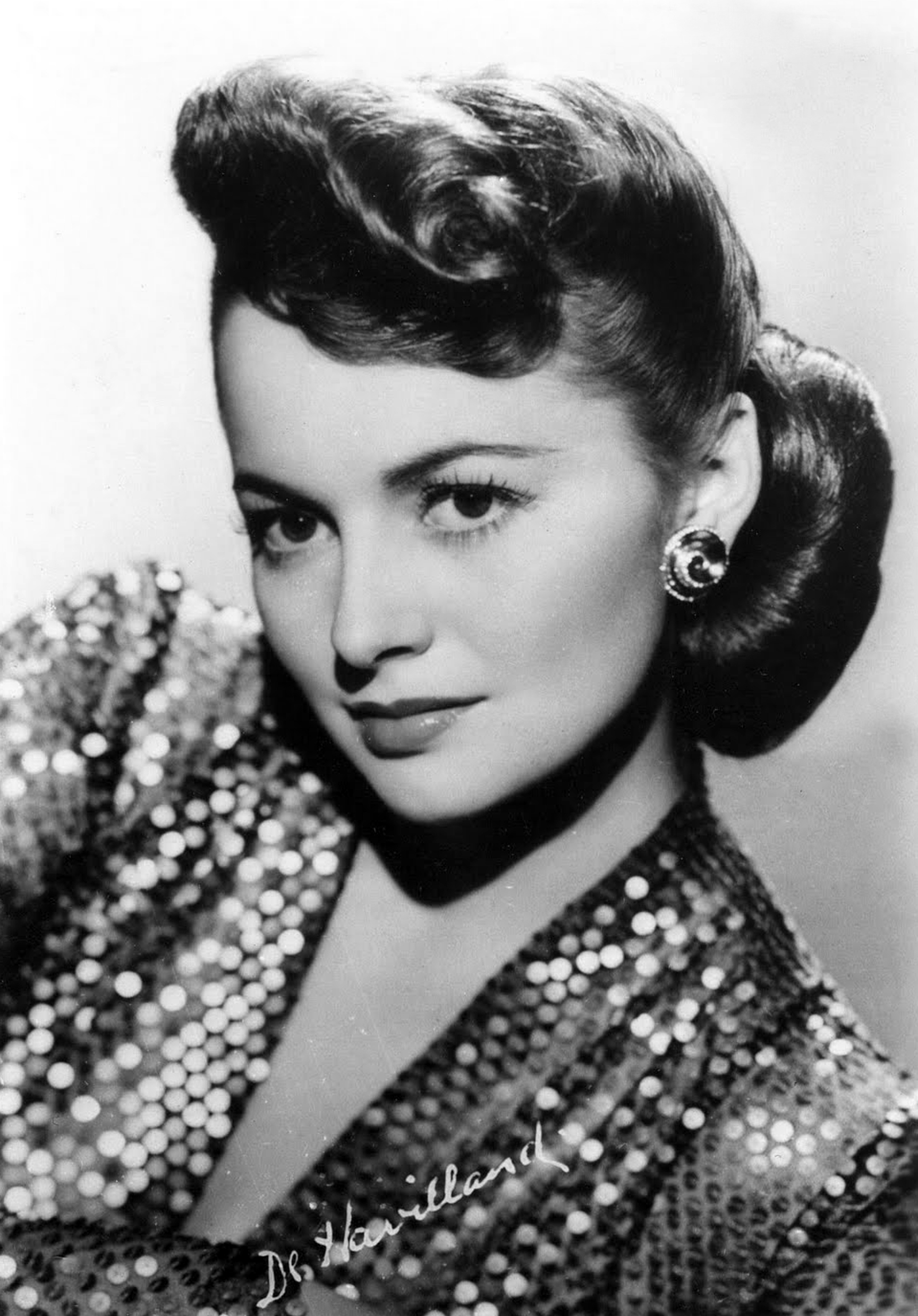
Olivia de Havilland

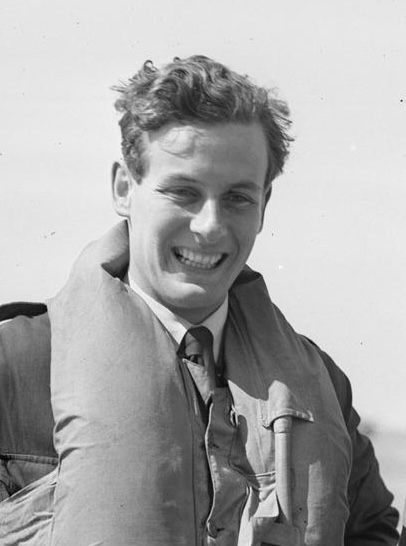
Peter Townsend

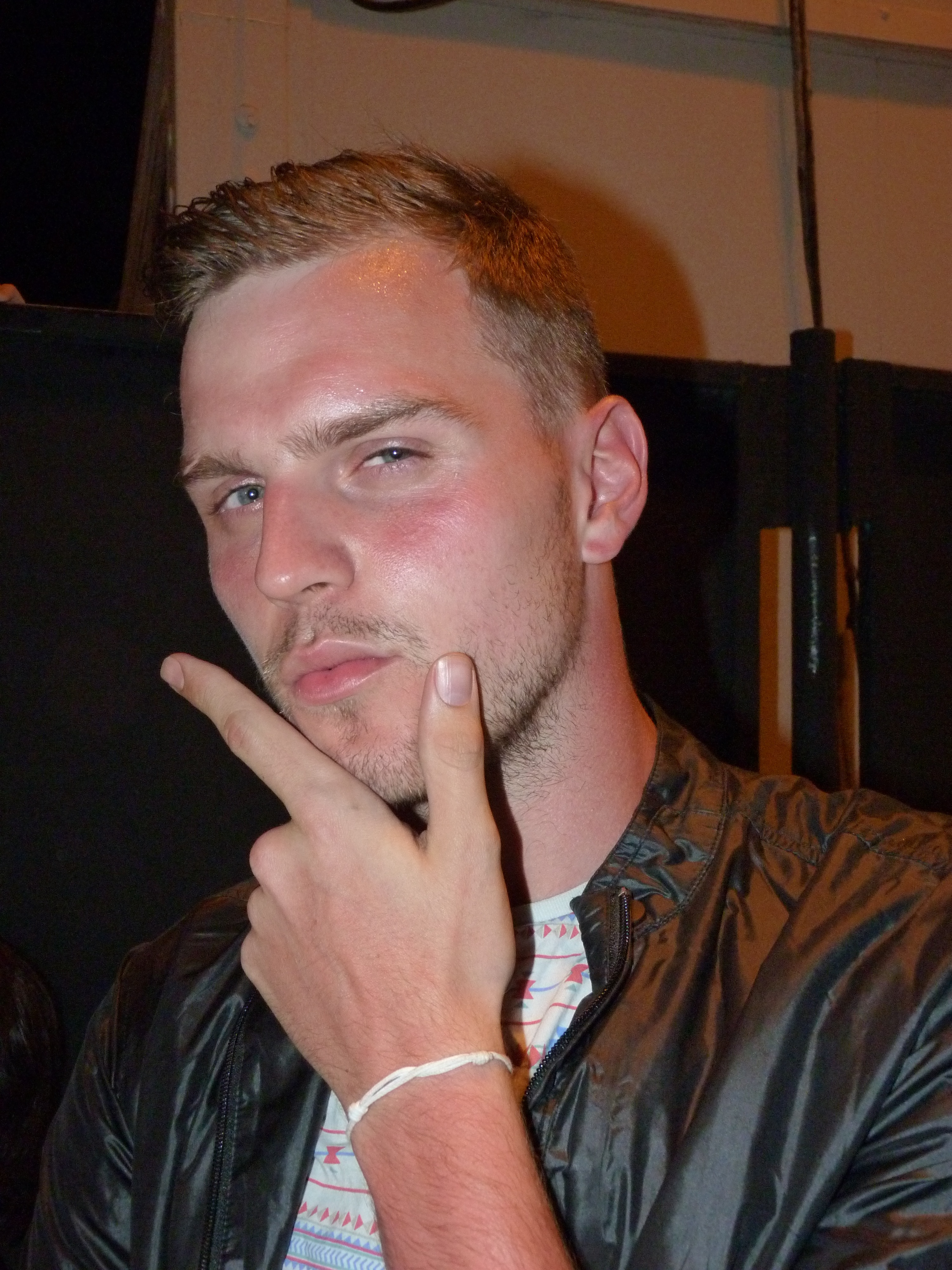
Matthew Raymond-Barker

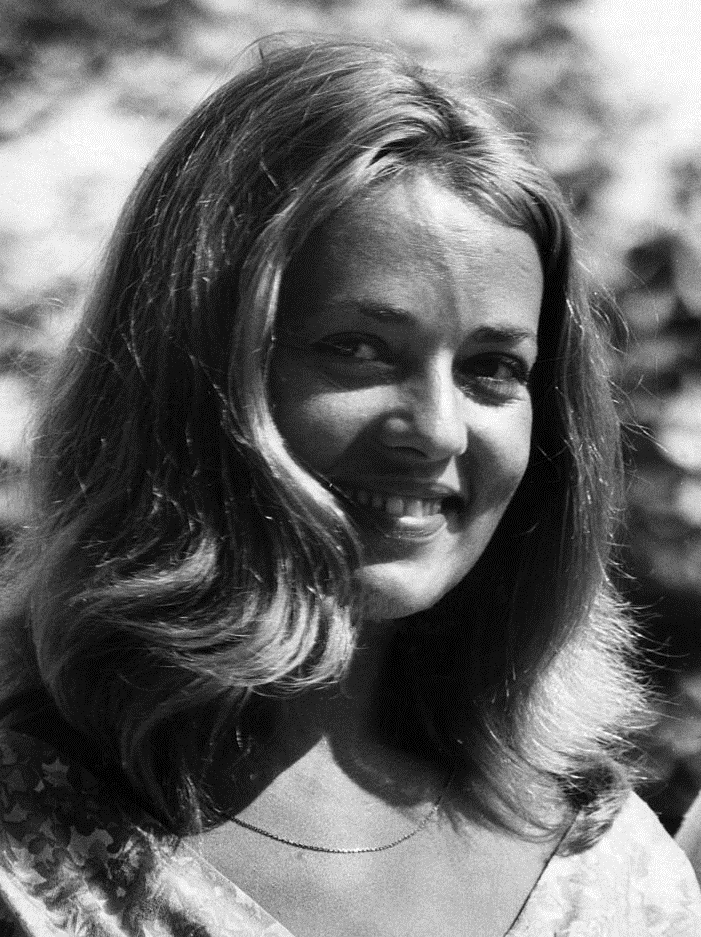
Jeanne Moreau

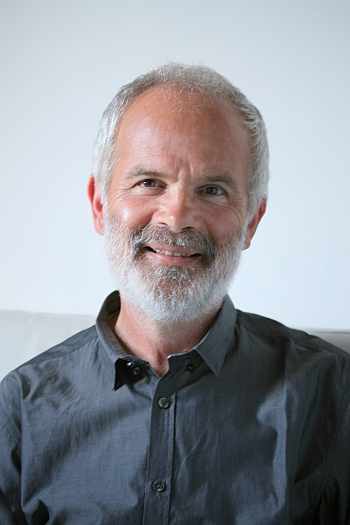
François Grosjean

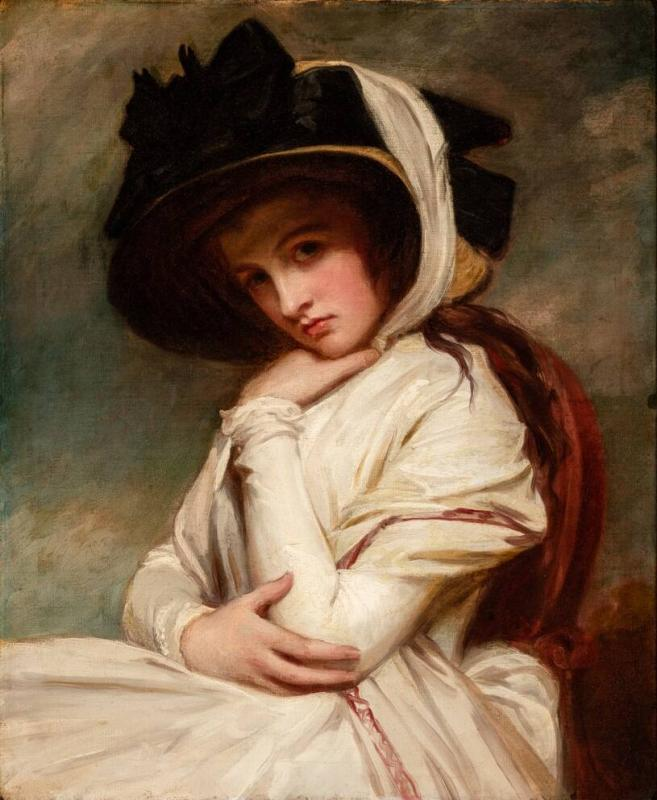
Emma, Lady Hamilton

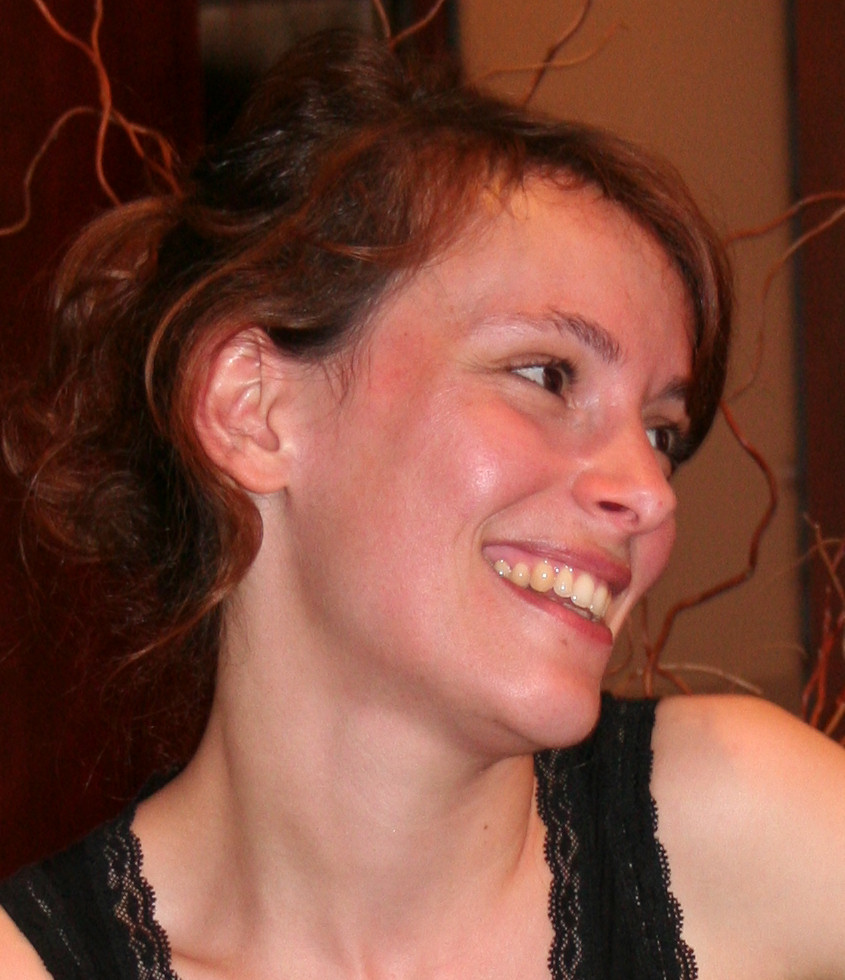
Emily Loizeau

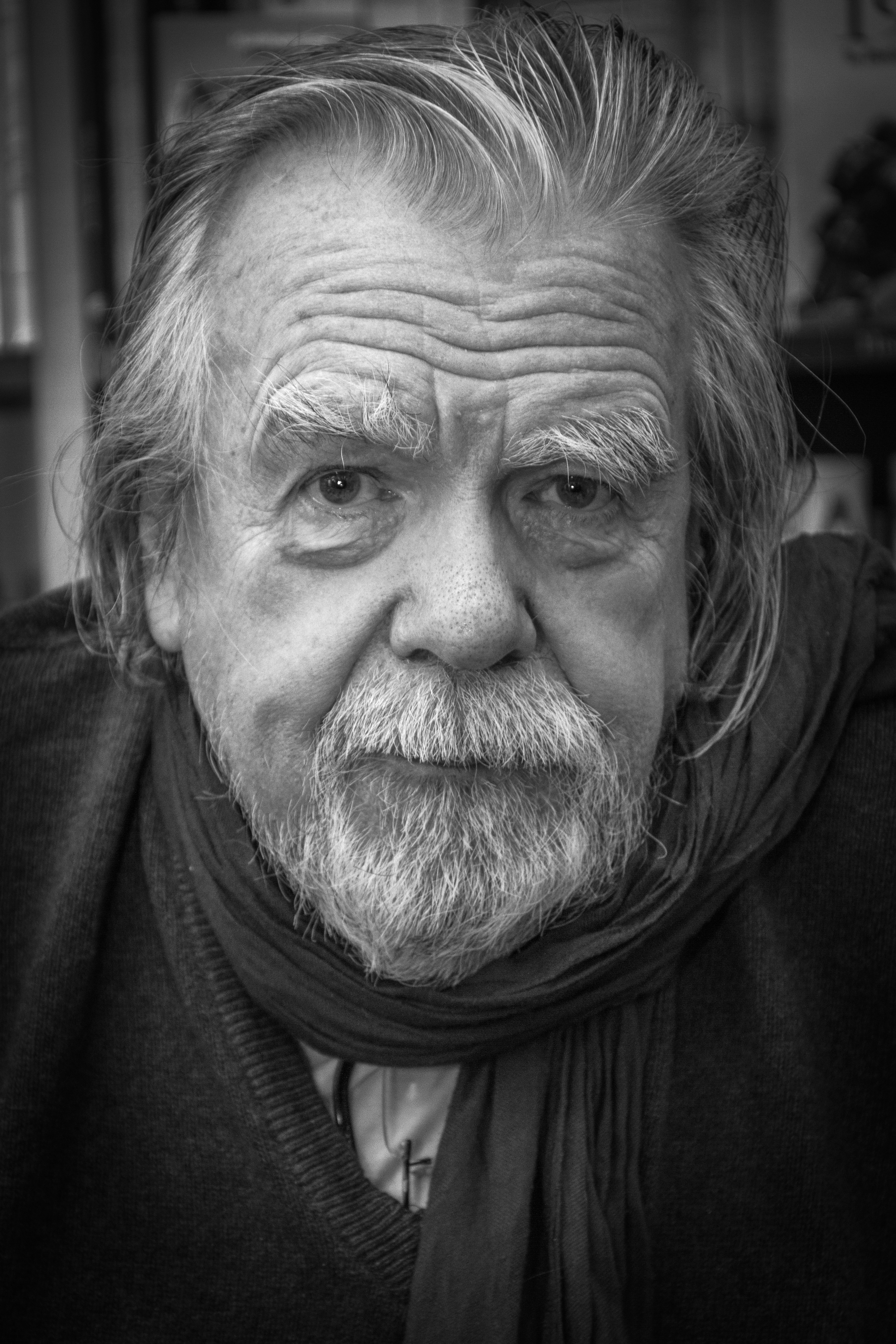
Michael Lonsdale

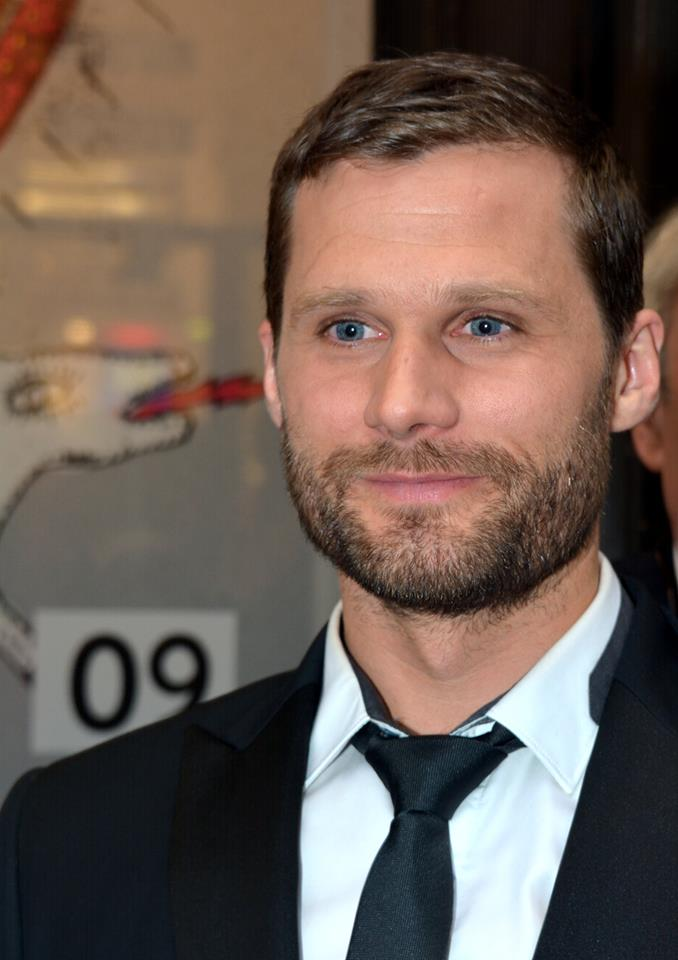
Alexis Michalik

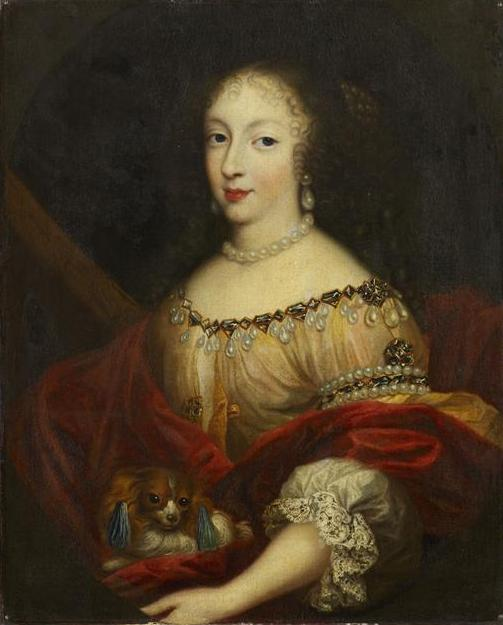
Henriette of England

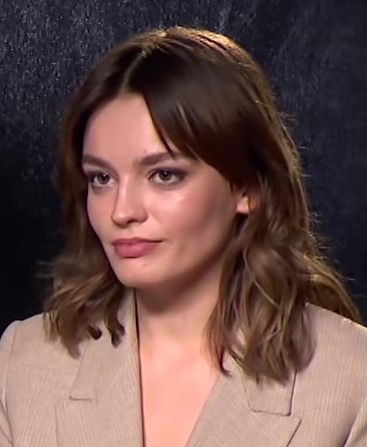
Emma Mackey

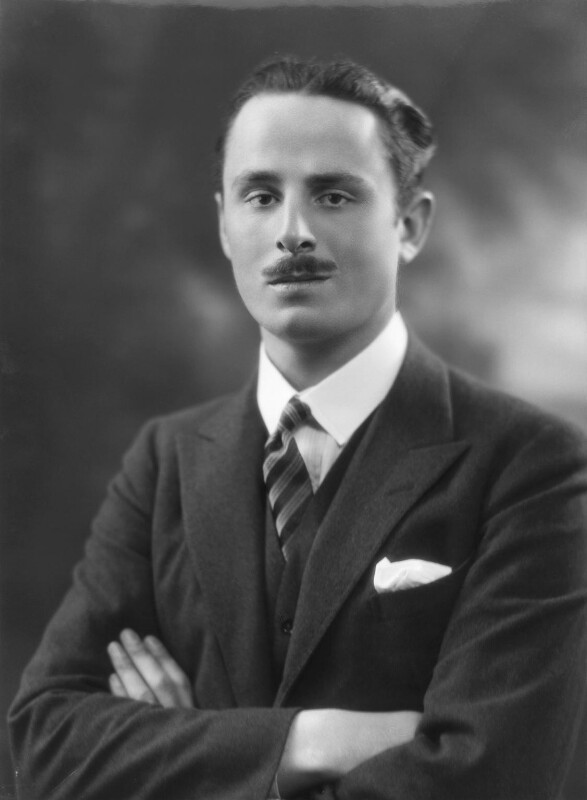
Oswald Mosley

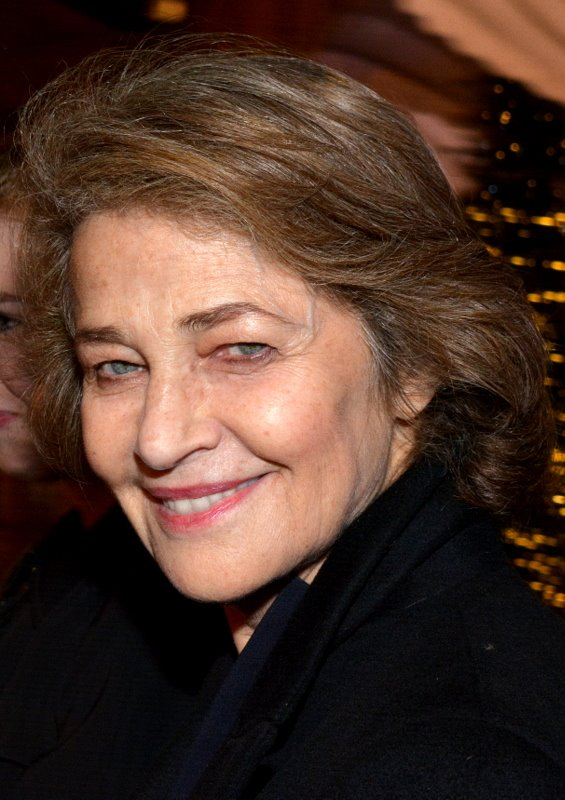
Charlotte Rampling

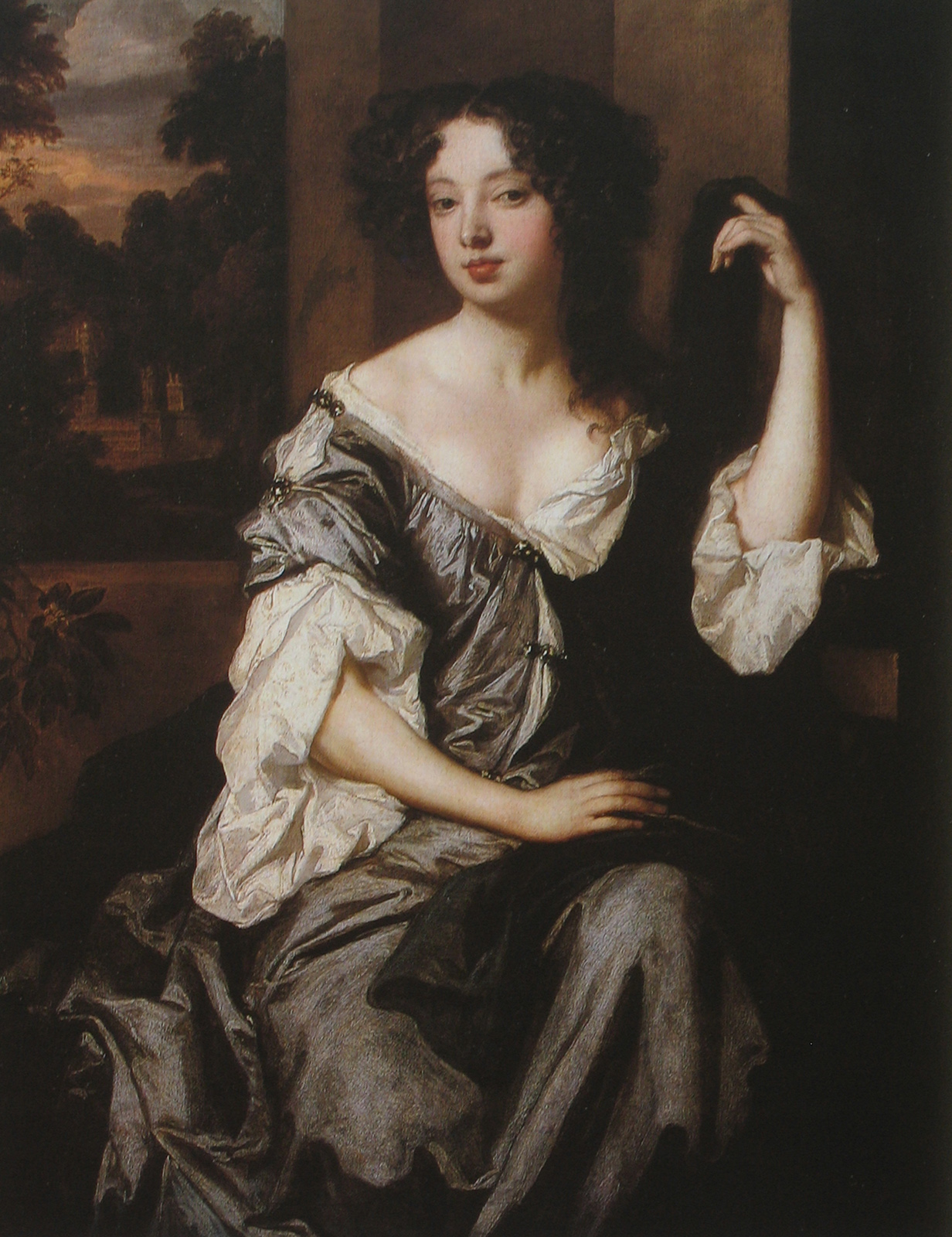
Louise de Kérouaille

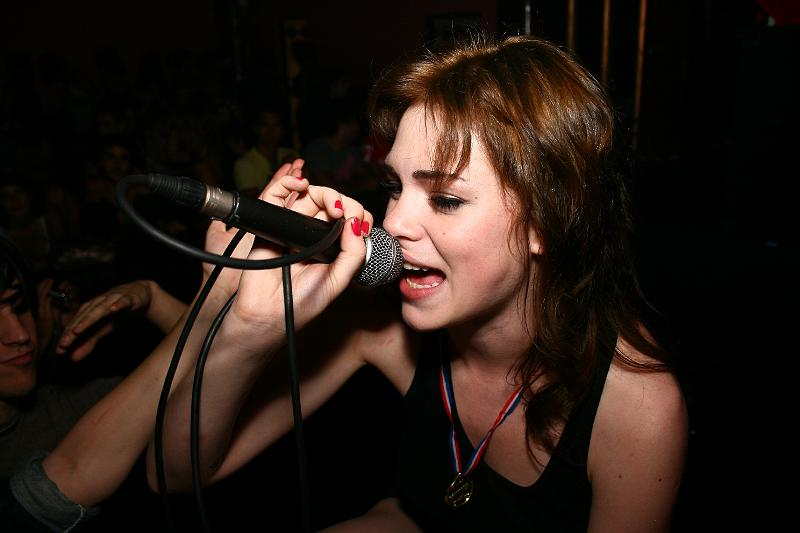
Uffie

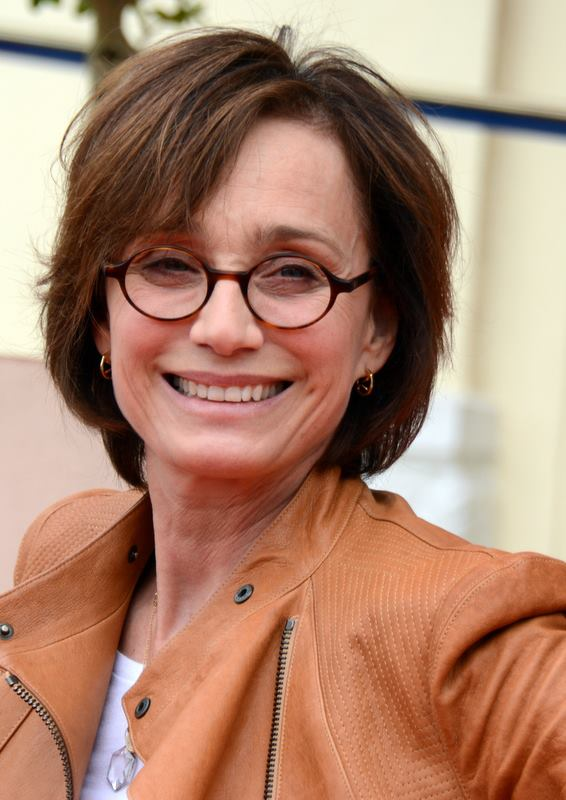
Kristin Scott Thomas

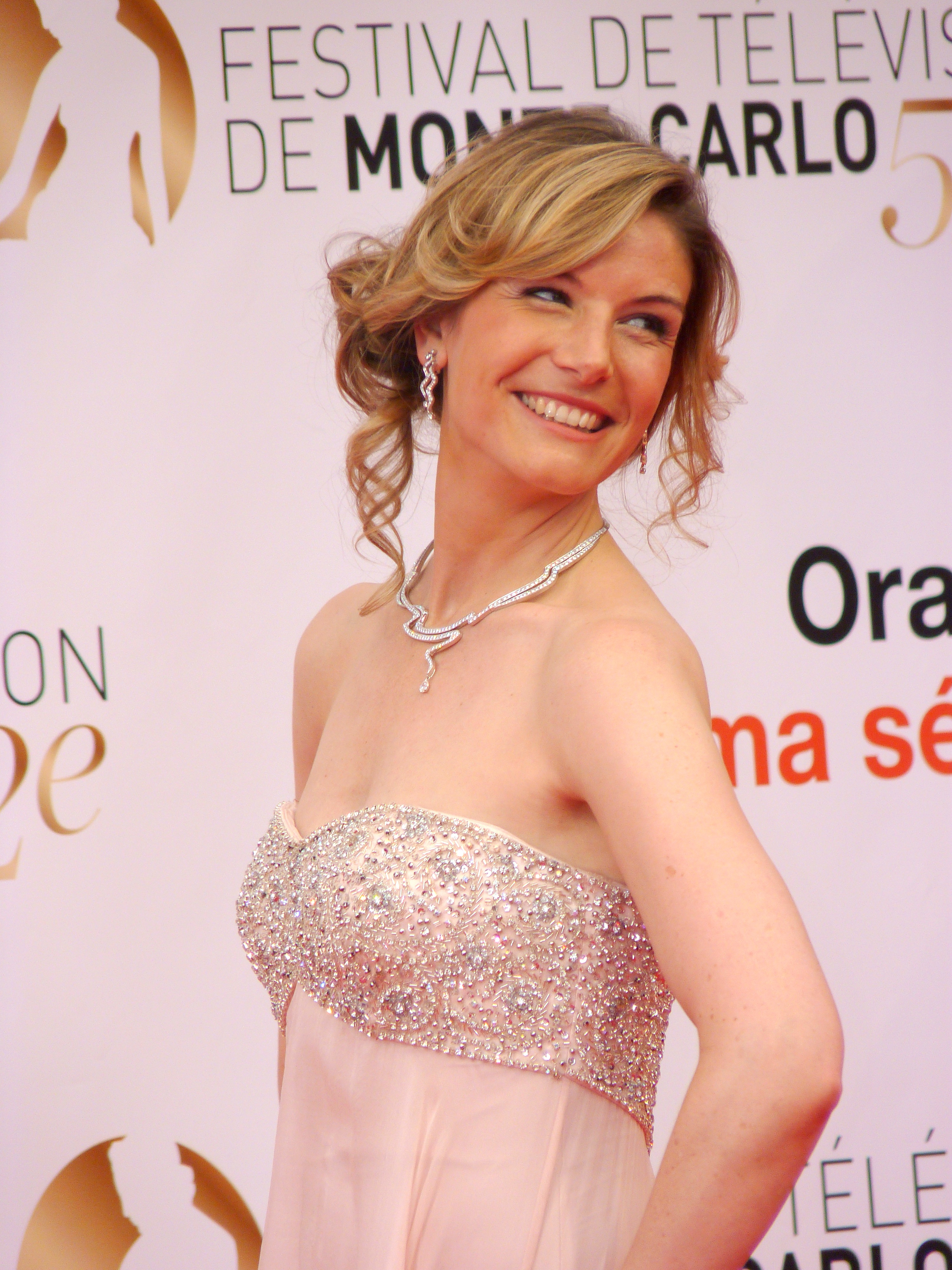
Louise Ekland

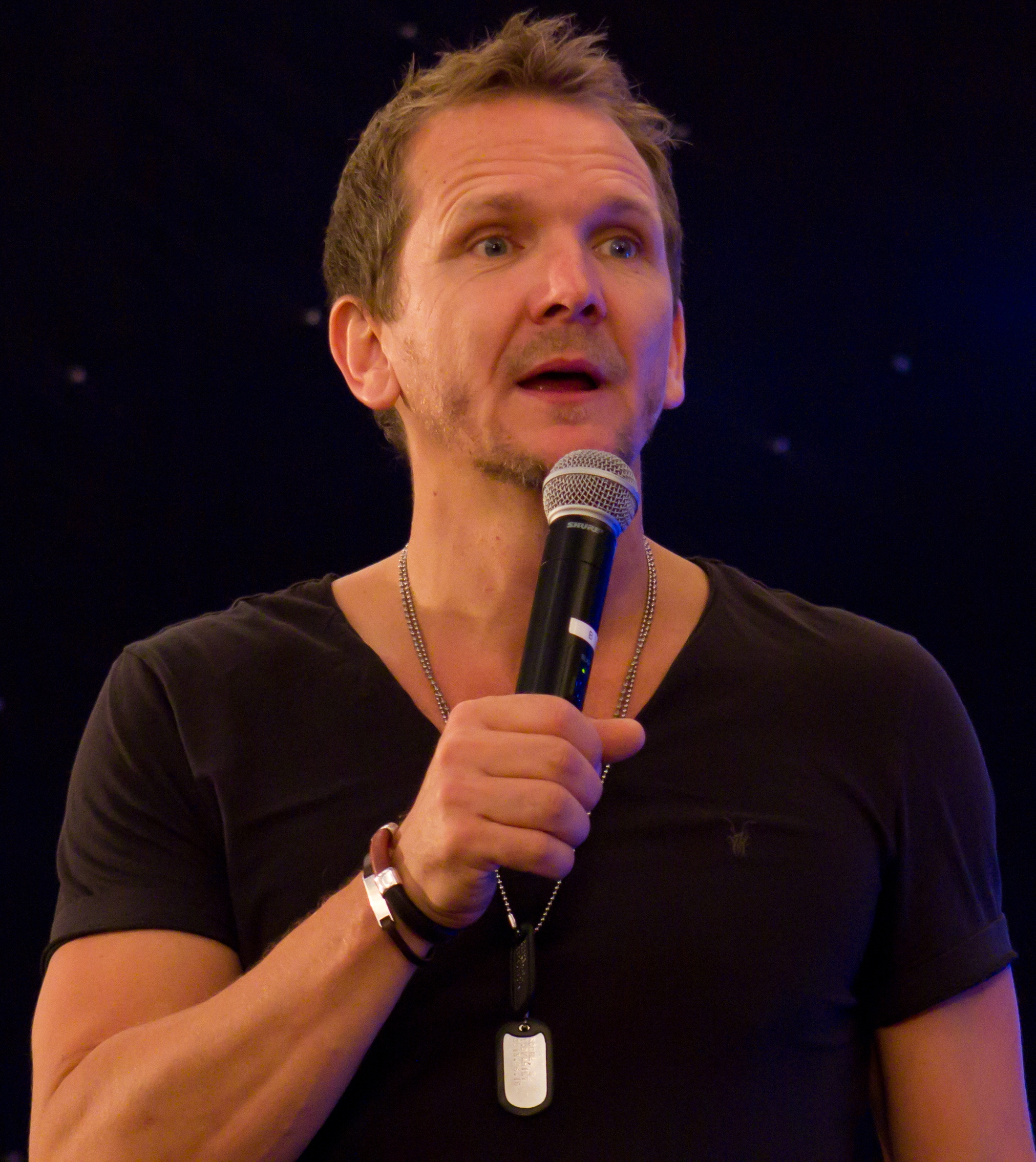
Sebastian Roché

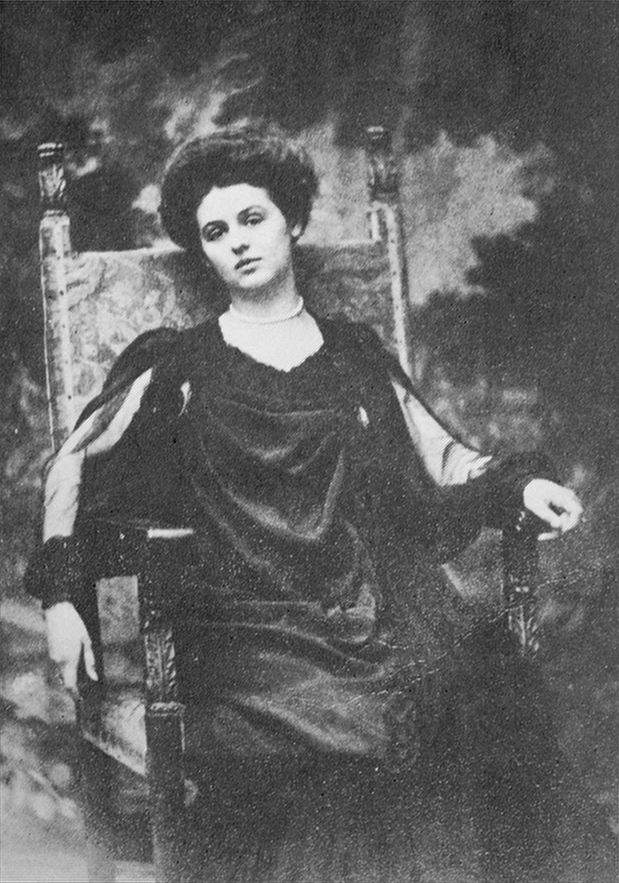
Renée Vivien

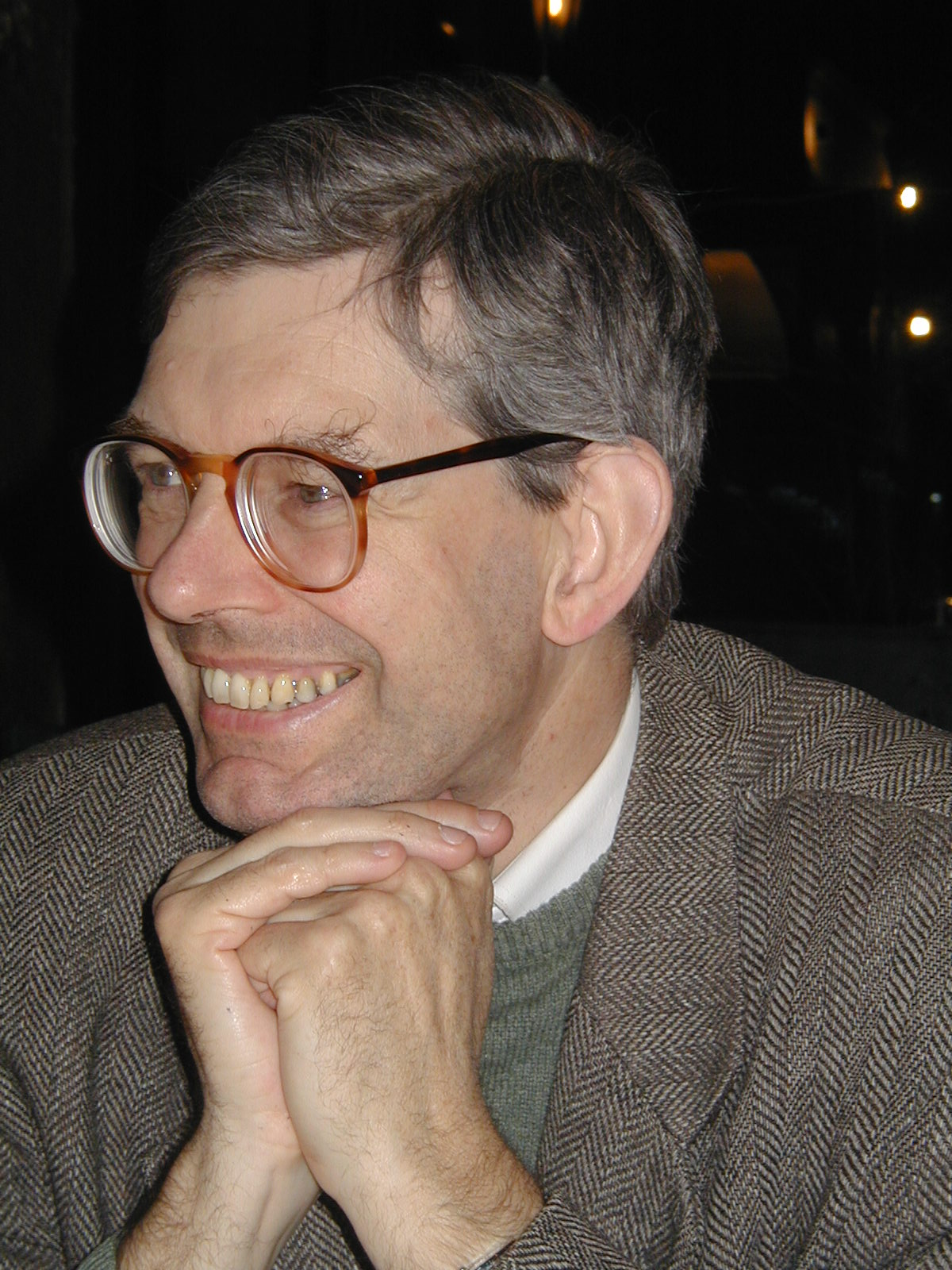
David Trotman

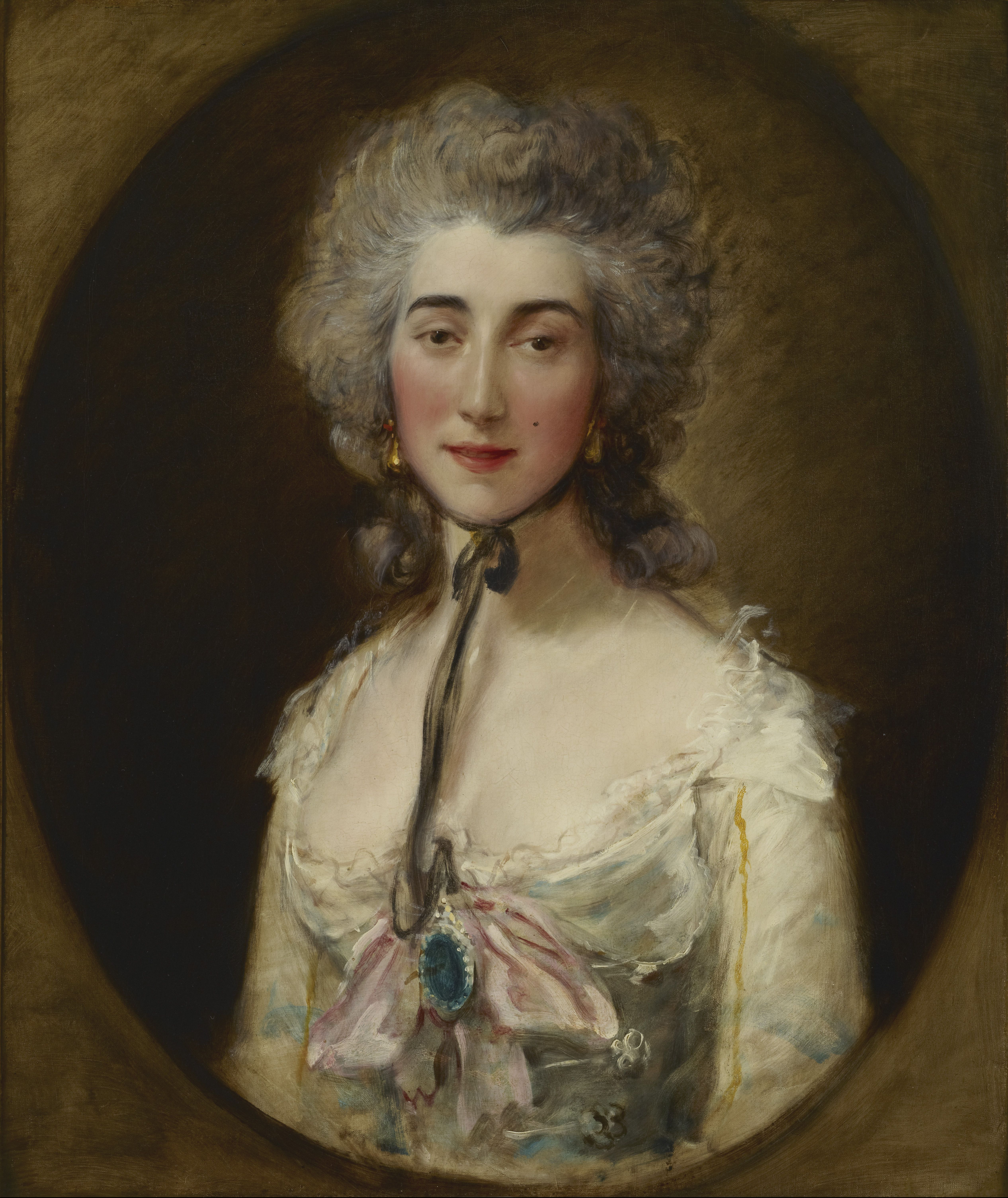
Grace Elliott

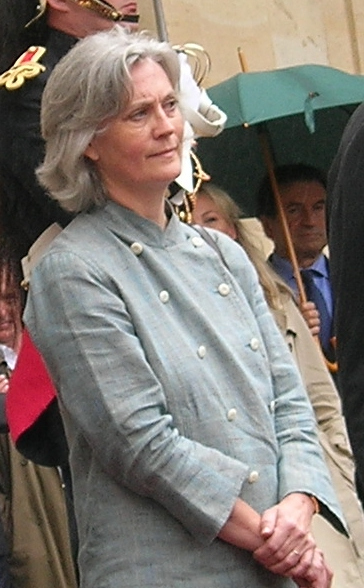
Penelope Fillon

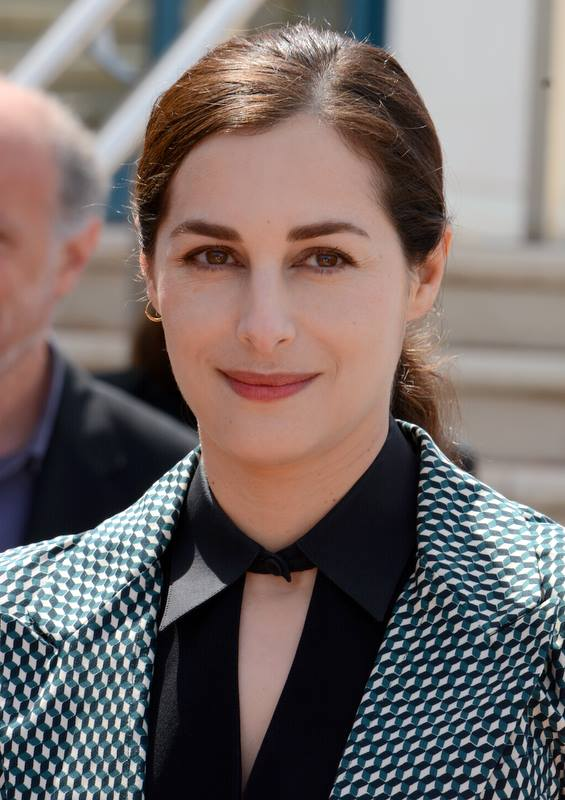
Amira Casar

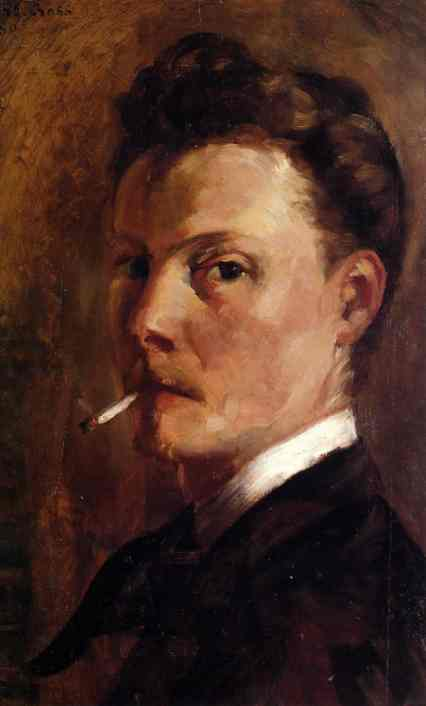
Henri-Edmond Cross

== See also ==
- French migration to the United Kingdom
- France–United Kingdom relations
- Swiss migration to France
- Americans in France
- Canadians in France
