= France–Switzerland relations =

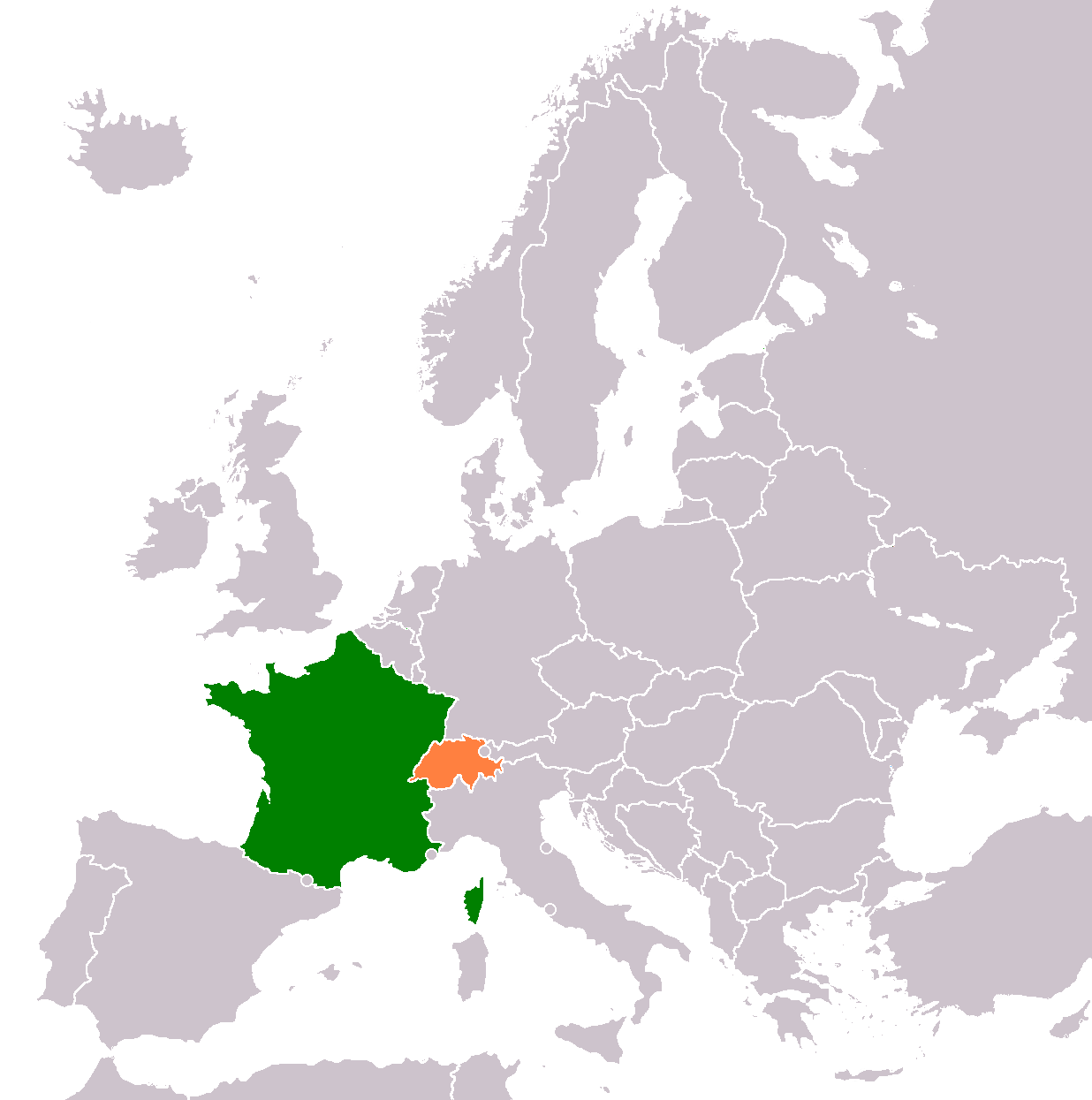
- France: Switzerland

Diplomatic mission
- Embassy of France, Bern: Embassy of Switzerland, Paris

Diplomatic relations between France and Switzerland have traditionally been close, through important economic and cultural exchanges. Switzerland and France (which is part of the European Union), share about 600 km of border (prompting strong cross-border cooperation) and a language (French is one of Switzerland's four official languages).

French-Swiss relations date back to the Middle Ages, when the Kingdom of France and the Old Swiss Confederacy established close contacts. The good neighborly relations ended when revolutionary France invaded Switzerland and established the Helvetic Republic in 1798. Switzerland remained a French vassal state until 1813. At the Congress of Vienna, Switzerland was granted small areas of French territory as compensation and Swiss independence was restored. After that, France respected Swiss neutrality and relations remained peaceful. In the early 21st century, both countries maintain friendly relations. France is a full member of the European Union and NATO, while Switzerland is not.

== History ==
=== Old history ===
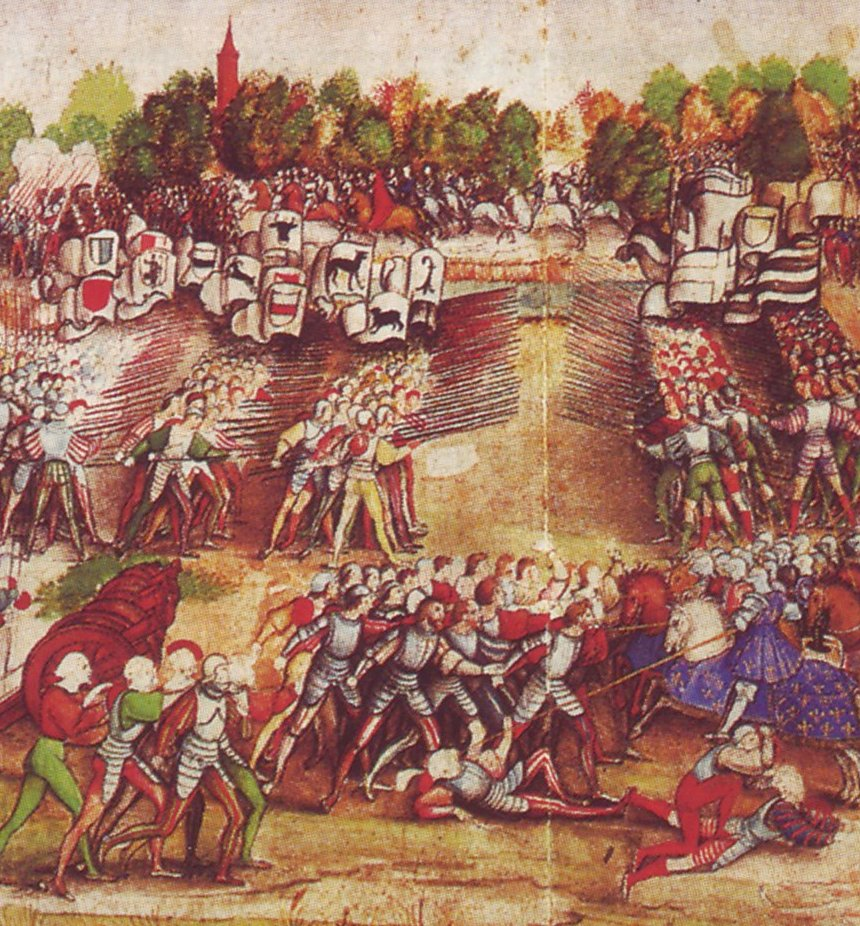
Battle of Marignano (1515)

Conflicts between the Old Swiss Confederacy first arose in the 13th century during the Hundred Years' War, when French mercenaries who had lost their jobs during breaks in fighting invaded north-western Switzerland. In 1444, the Armagnacs invaded Switzerland in support of the Habsburgs. After the Battle of St. Jakob an der Birs, the Dauphin of France was impressed by the fighting power of the Confederacy and concluded a peace treaty with the Swiss. The French tried to bind the Confederacy to them through bilateral agreements, and in 1474/75 a military alliance was formed against the Burgundians. Numerous mercenaries from Switzerland fought for the French kings. During the Transalpine campaigns of the Old Swiss Confederacy, however, a conflict arose between France, the Confederacy and other powers over the control of northern Italy. In the Battle of Marignano (1515), the Swiss were finally defeated by the troops of Francis I and driven out of Milan. In 1516, France and Switzerland signed a Treaty of Perpetual Peace ("paix perpétuelle"). A military treaty was signed in 1521, which the protective power of the Confederacy against the Habsburgs. This established an alliance between the two sides lasting centuries.

With the occupation of Savoy by France, the Swiss conquered the Vaud and Chablais regions and could better protect Geneva. The Treaty of Lyon (1601) between France and Savoy made France and Switzerland neighbors. The French kings borrowed large sums of money from the Swiss, which facilitated the emergence of Switzerland as a financial center from the 16th century onwards. However, the payment discipline of the French often left much to be desired. In 1601, the debts of the French crown to the Swiss amounted to 11.6 million gold crowns. Pensions for military service were also often paid late. During the war against the Augsburg Alliance, 37,220 Swiss fought in the French infantry and 22,620 during the War of the Austrian Succession. Most of the mercenaries in French service came from the rural and Catholic areas of Switzerland and some later settled in France.

=== French Revolution and Napoleonic Wars ===
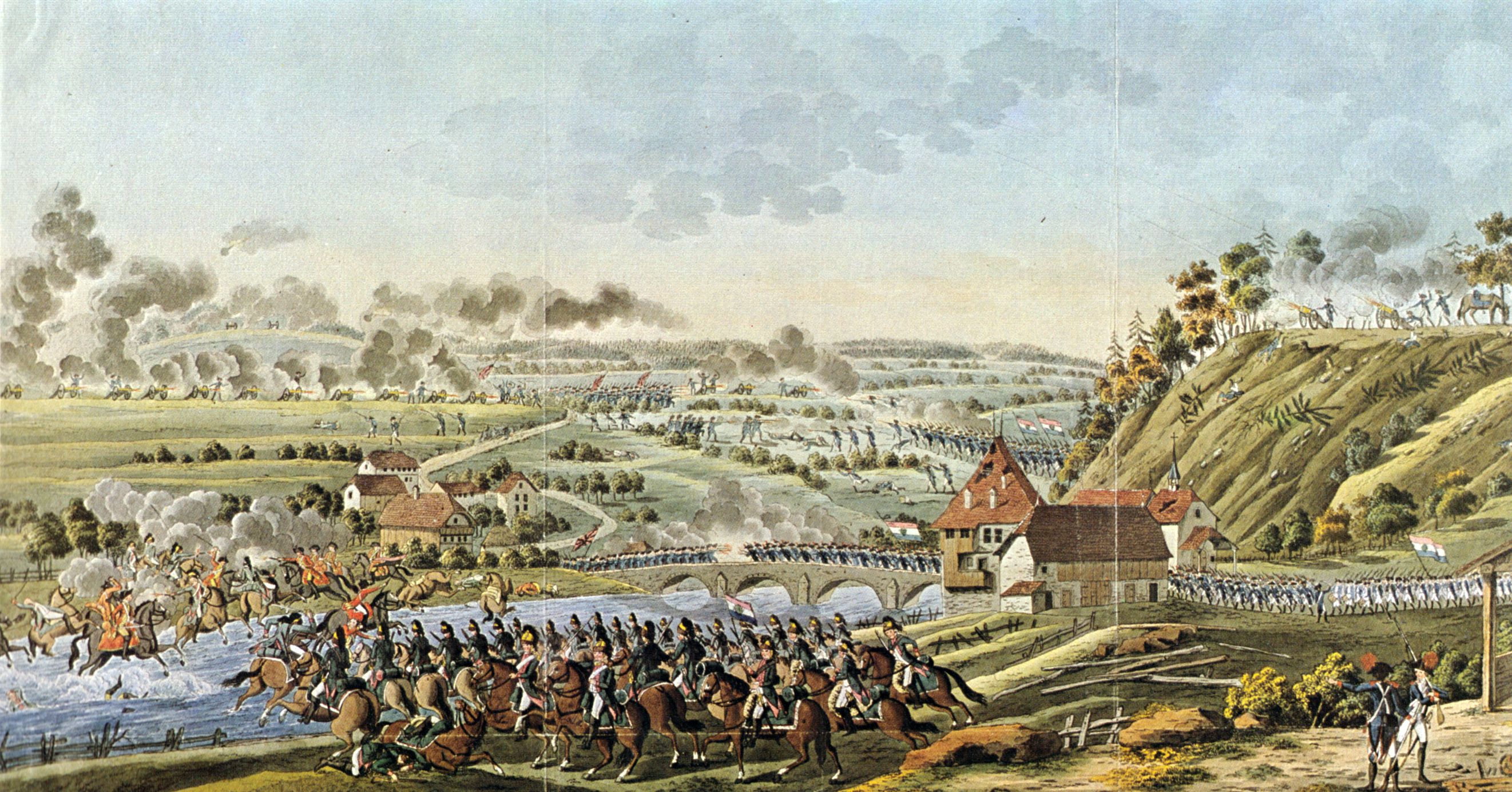
French invasion of Switzerland (1798)

The Swiss nobility aligned itself with France and French-speaking Swiss thinkers such as Jean-Jacques Rousseau also attracted a great deal of attention in France and influenced the French Enlightenment, which demonstrates the close contact between the two countries. It was not until the French Revolution (1789) that the political and military alliance between the two countries came to an end. The revolution initially aroused sympathy in Switzerland, but the revolutionary terror soon made the Swiss fearful. The fact that numerous anti-revolutionary aristocrats from France found refuge in Switzerland, while the Helvetic Club in Paris called for the revolution to be extended to Switzerland, caused additional discord on both sides. The French terminated the military alliance with the Swiss and diplomatic relations were suspended in 1792. The suspension of mutual trade and the interruption of payments for Swiss mercenaries hit Switzerland hard economically.

With the start of the Coalition Wars, Switzerland declared itself neutral. In 1797, Napoleon Bonaparte nevertheless decided to invade Switzerland, as it occupied a strategically important position north of Italy and was prosperous. After the French invasion, the Helvetic Republic was established as a Napoleonic sister republic under French influence. Under Napoleon, numerous modernizing reforms were introduced, including the abolition of the feudal system, the introduction of a modern administration and the creation of a national army. The greater political centralization of Switzerland was also initiated. Napoleon imposed the Act of Mediation on the Swiss after internal disputes and the French annexed or occupied numerous Swiss territories such as Geneva, Mulhouse and Neuchâtel and made Valais an independent republic in 1802, which they also annexed to France in 1810. Switzerland was also plundered economically and had to pay high war levies, which caused discontent among the population.

=== Relations after the Congress of Vienna ===
With the defeat of the French in the coalition wars, France had to return all the annexed territories. With the Second Treaty of Paris, France also ceded some municipalities to Switzerland, giving Geneva a land link with the rest of Switzerland and making the Pays de Gex region a free zone. However, the post-revolutionary mercenary system and the old Swiss trading privileges were not restored. After 1815, trade disputes, the Swiss right of asylum for political refugees and French interference in Switzerland's internal affairs strained relations. In 1857, France's Napoleon III mediated in the Treaty of Paris (1857) in the Neuchâtel dispute between Prussia and Switzerland. In 1860, the annexation of Savoy by France led to a political crisis with Switzerland, which was settled by the Savoy trade, which created a neutral zone south of Lake Geneva to which Switzerland had laid claim. Four years later, the two countries concluded a trade agreement. Relations subsequently improved.

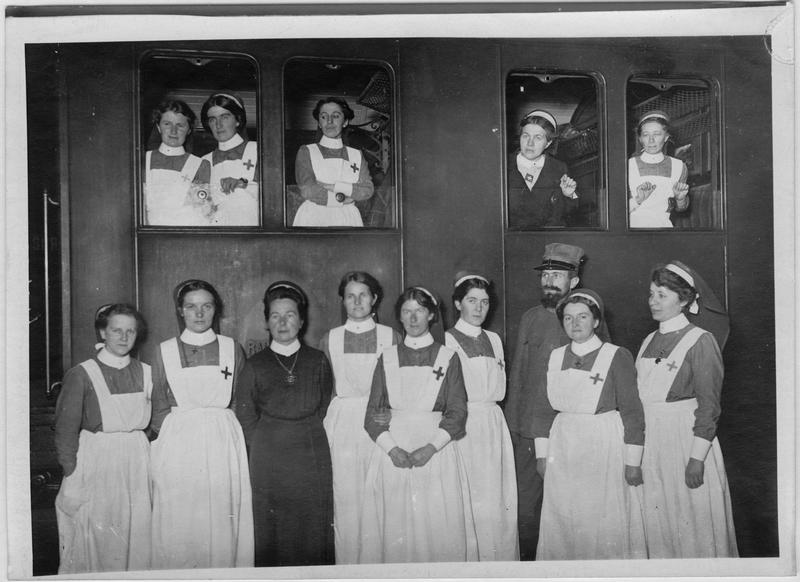
A group of Swiss nurses at the Gare des Brotteaux, Lyon, France, December 1915

A competition for influence in Switzerland developed in the late 19th century between the German Empire and France, for example in the construction of railroad lines. Switzerland remained neutral during the First World War, although France considered occupying Switzerland. Despite its neutrality, however, the war divided Switzerland internally, as German-speaking Switzerland sympathized with the German Empire, while French-speaking Switzerland was close to France. This division was reinforced by the propaganda of the war parties, which was disseminated in the respective language areas. The Swiss government tried to mediate between the warring parties. Switzerland also played an important role as a mediator in the interwar period, for example during the Locarno Treaties (1925). During the German occupation of France in the Second World War, Switzerland recognized the Vichy government until 1944 and maintained its neutral position during the war. The Swiss prevented a mass exodus of people persecuted by the Nazi regime from France to Switzerland through a restrictive asylum policy.

In the post-war period, Franco-Swiss relations normalized after disputes such as the continued presence of French Vichy collaborators in Switzerland were resolved. Some strains in the mutual relationship were caused by Swiss fears of French support for Jura separatism, the Mirage affair and ongoing disputes over French tax evasion in Switzerland. In 1981, the Socialists in France introduced a tax on wealth transfers to Switzerland and in 1998 a cooperation agreement was signed between the two countries on police, legal and customs matters. Economic exchange was significantly intensified as part of European unification. However, Switzerland's application to join the EU was rejected in referendums in 1992 and 2001.

== Political relations ==
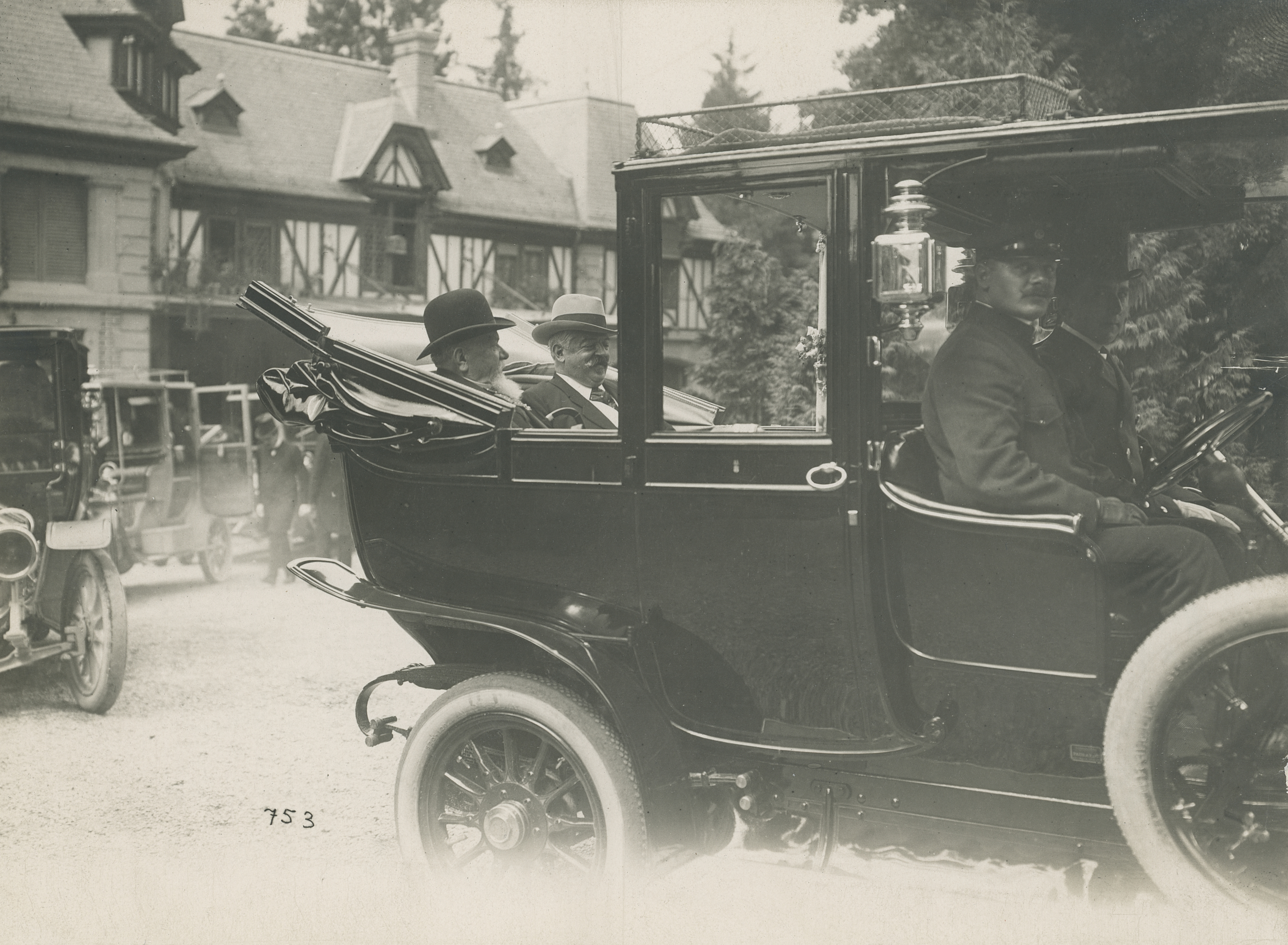
15 August 1910 – the first state visit ever to the Swiss Confederation (Federal State of 1848) takes place: The President of the Swiss Confederation, Robert Comtesse (right), and the President of the French Republic, Armand Fallières, leave the cour d'honneur of the French ambassador's residence at 44 Sulgeneckstrasse in Bern in a brand new De Dion-Bouton Landaulet Type CH for a city tour (this model was only produced in 1910).

France has been appointing ambassadors to Switzerland since the 16th century and Switzerland's first representation abroad, in 1798, was in French capital Paris (closely followed by a consulate in Bordeaux). By the end of the 19th century, the only country with a legation in the Swiss capital Bern was France.

As of 2015, there were four state visits of Presidents of France in Switzerland: Armand Fallières in August 1910, François Mitterrand on 14–15 April 1983, Jacques Chirac in 1998 and François Hollande on 15–16 April 2015.

== Economy ==
France is Switzerland's third-largest trading partner (after Germany and Italy) and the two are integrated economically via Swiss treaties with the European Union. Switzerland is also part of the Schengen Area, which abolishes border checks between member states. 220,000 French nationals cross the border to work in Switzerland, half of all foreign cross-border commuters.

== Migration ==
The almost 200,000 Swiss in France form the largest group of Swiss abroad, while almost 185,000 French have their permanent residence in Switzerland.

== Resident diplomatic missions ==
- France has an embassy in Bern and consulates-general in Geneva and Zürich.
- Switzerland has an embassy in Paris and consulates-general in Lyon, Marseille and Strasbourg.
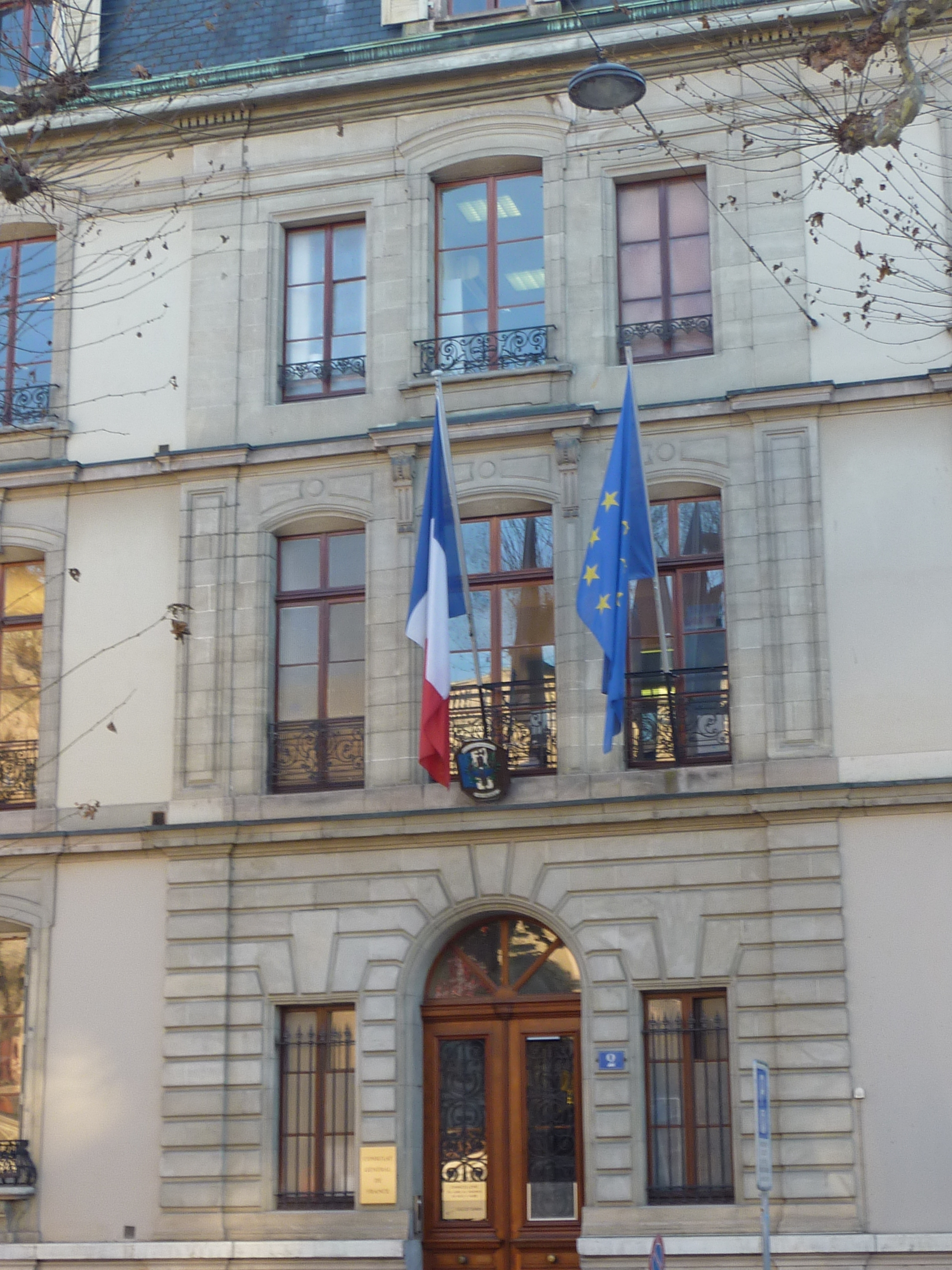
Consulate-General of France in Geneva

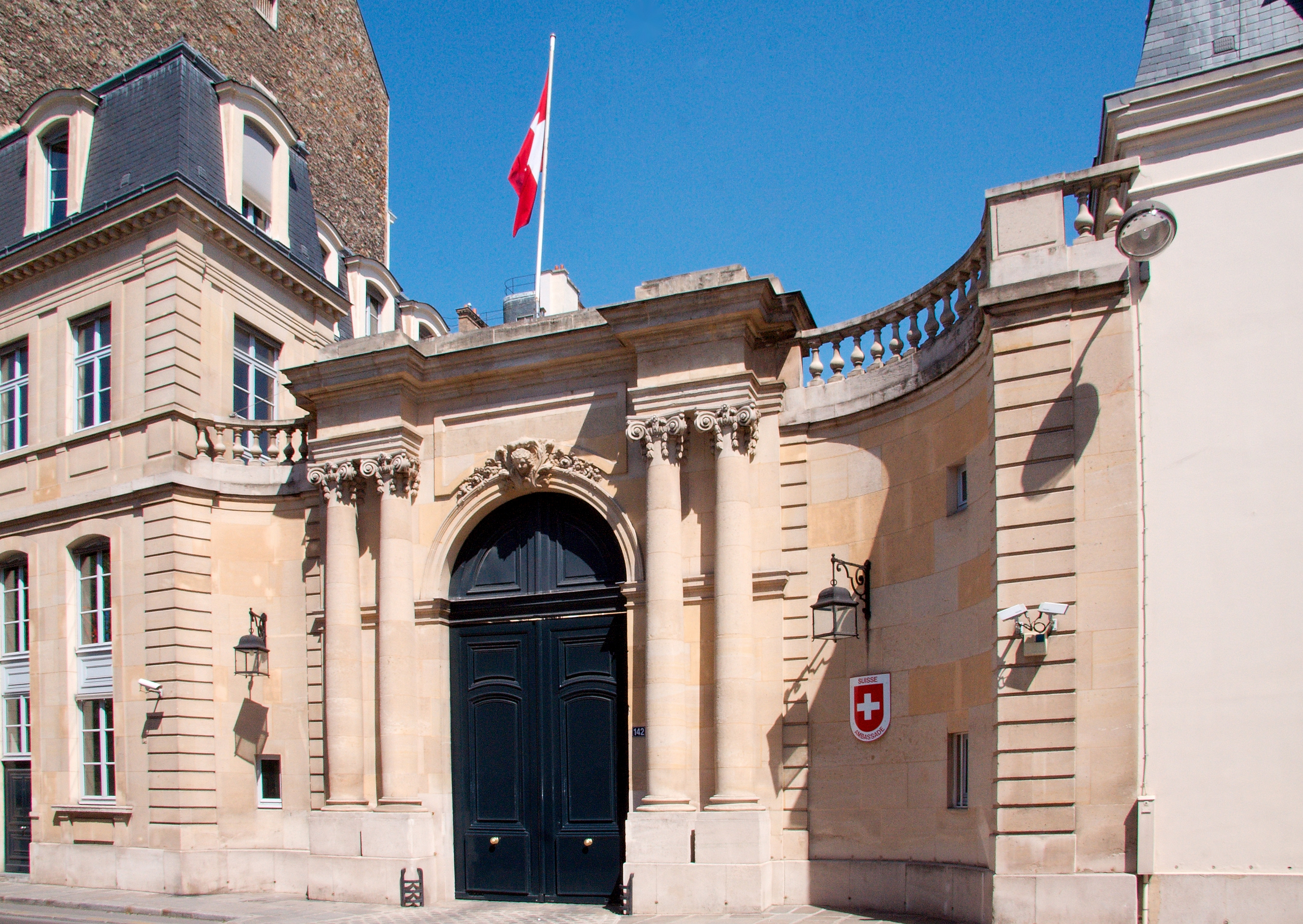
Hôtel de Besenval, Embassy of Switzerland in Paris

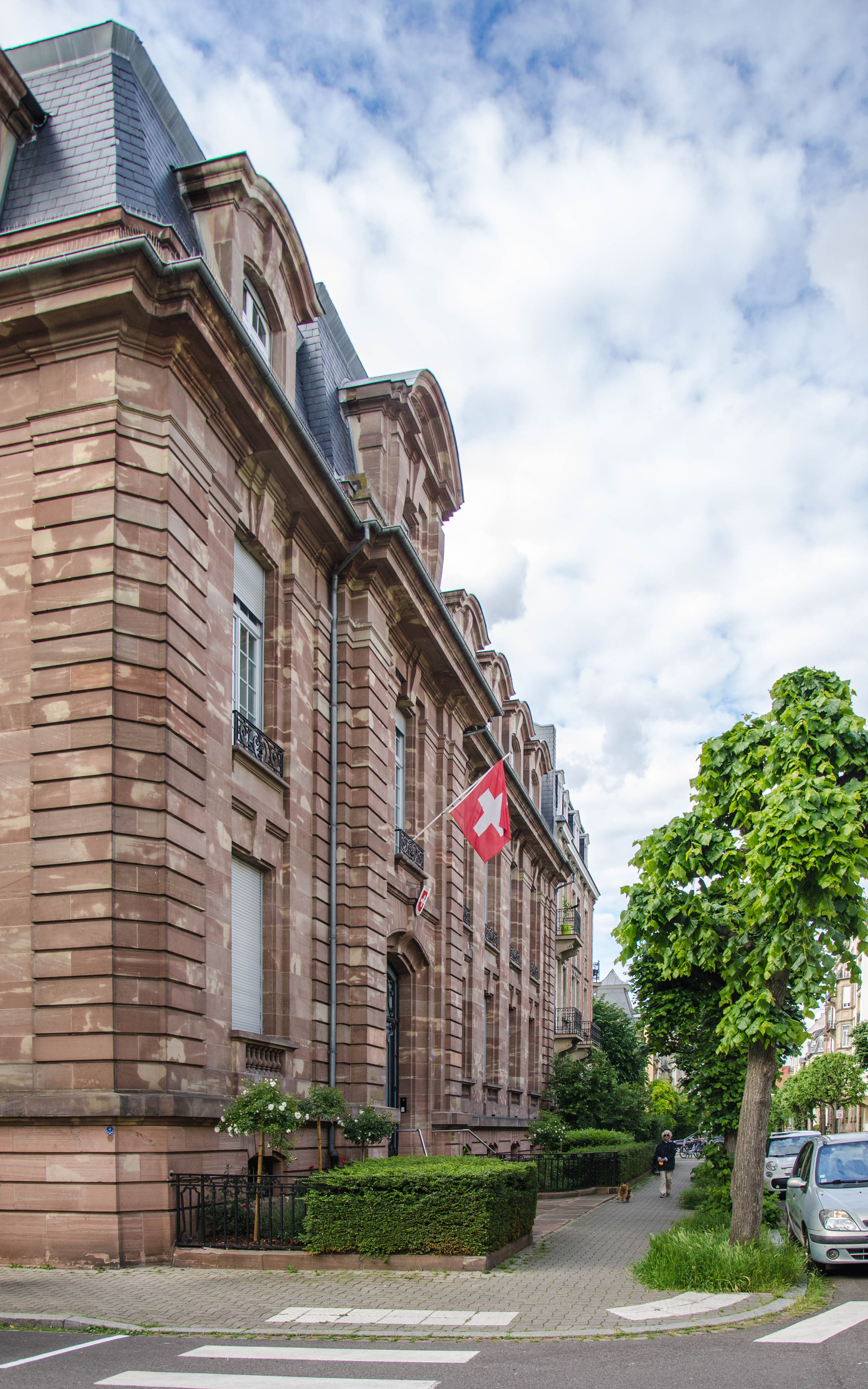
Consulate-General of Switzerland in Strasbourg

== See also ==
- France–Switzerland border
- French invasion of Switzerland
- Swiss migration to France
- Switzerland–European Union relations
- List of ambassadors of Switzerland to France
