= Swiss migration to France =

Swiss-born people in France
Total population
- est. 197,411 (2026)

Regions with significant populations
- Île-de-France, Aquitaine, Languedoc-Roussillon, Midi-Pyrénées, Brittany, Poitou-Charentes, Corsica, Centre-Val de Loire

Languages
- German, French, Italian, Romansh

Religion
- Swiss Reformed Church, Orthodox and Catholicism,

Related ethnic groups
- Swiss

Swiss migration to France has resulted in France being home to one of the largest Swiss-born populations outside Switzerland. Migration from the Switzerland to France has increased rapidly from the 1980s onward and by 2017 there were an estimated 58,500 Swiss-Born people living in France. Besides Paris, the Swiss living in France have formed communities primarily in Southern France, Brittany, and Corsica.

== Notable people ==
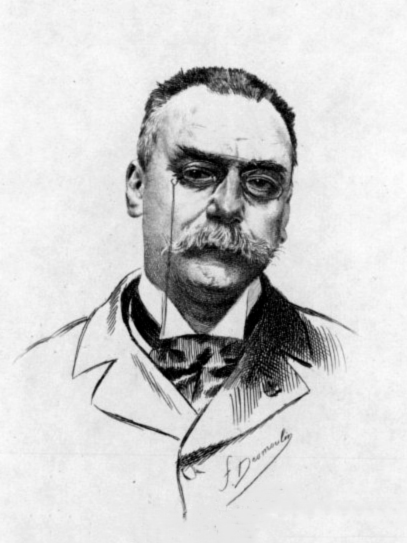
Eugène Grasset

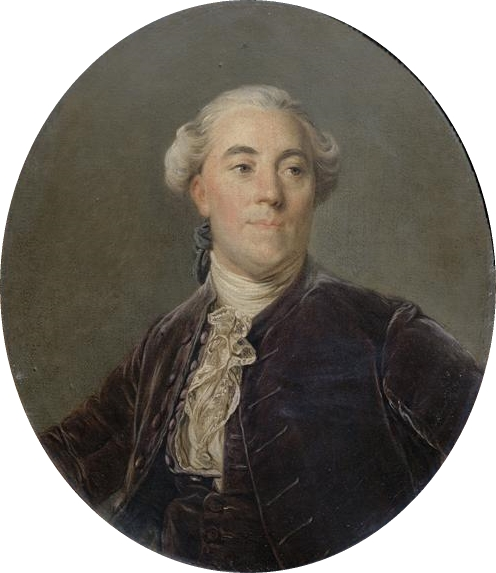
Jacques Necker

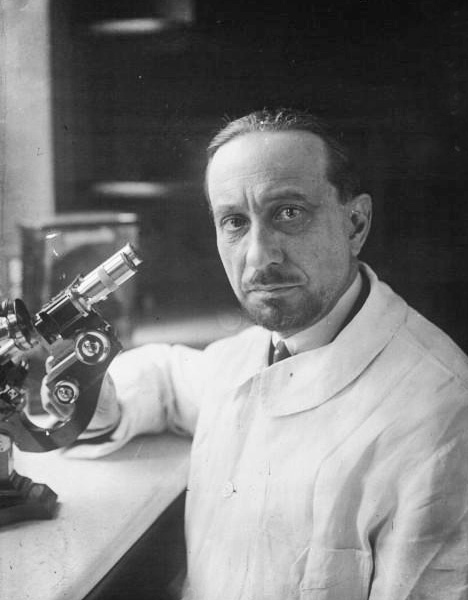
Gustave Roussy

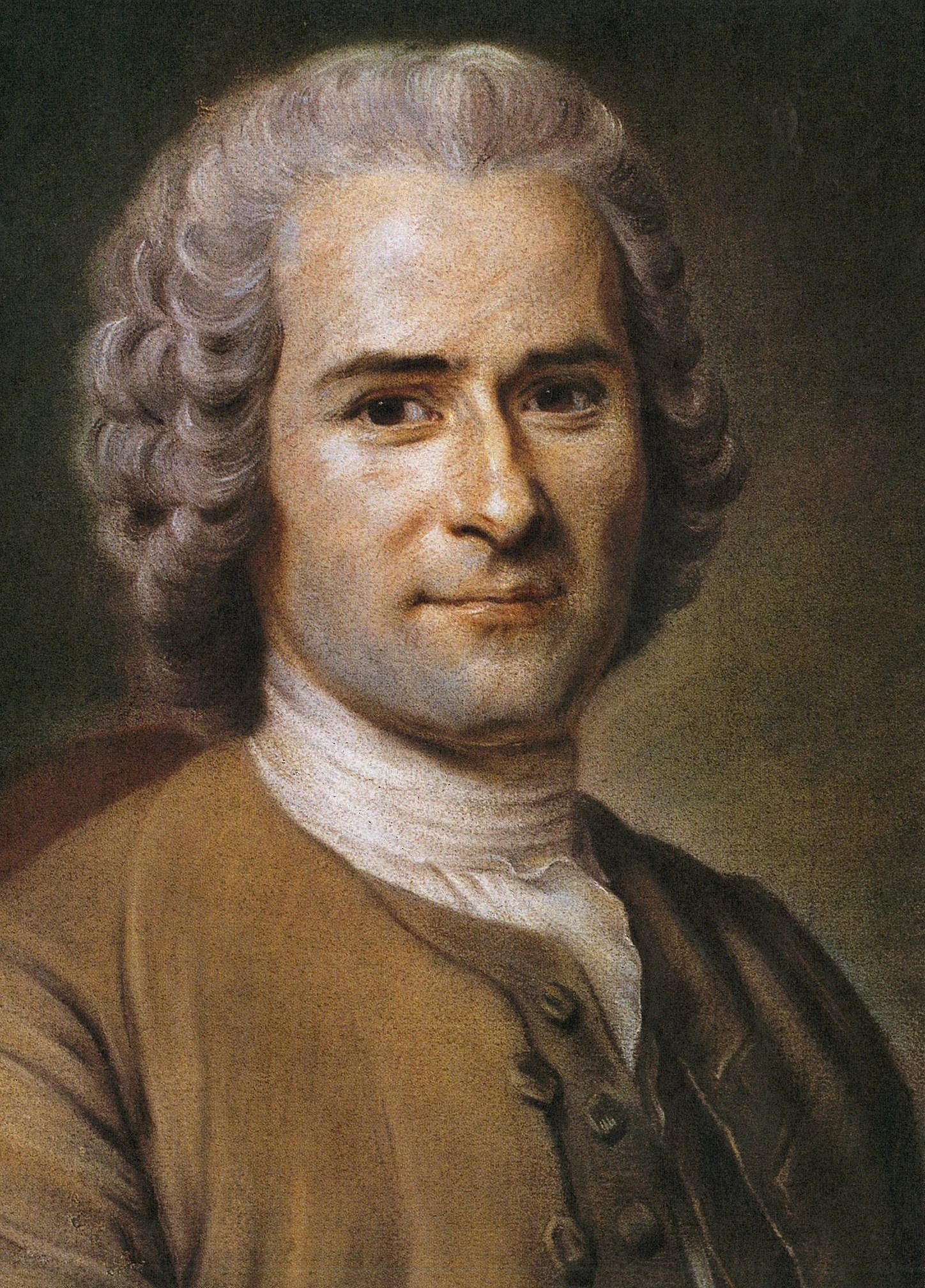
Jean-Jacques Rousseau

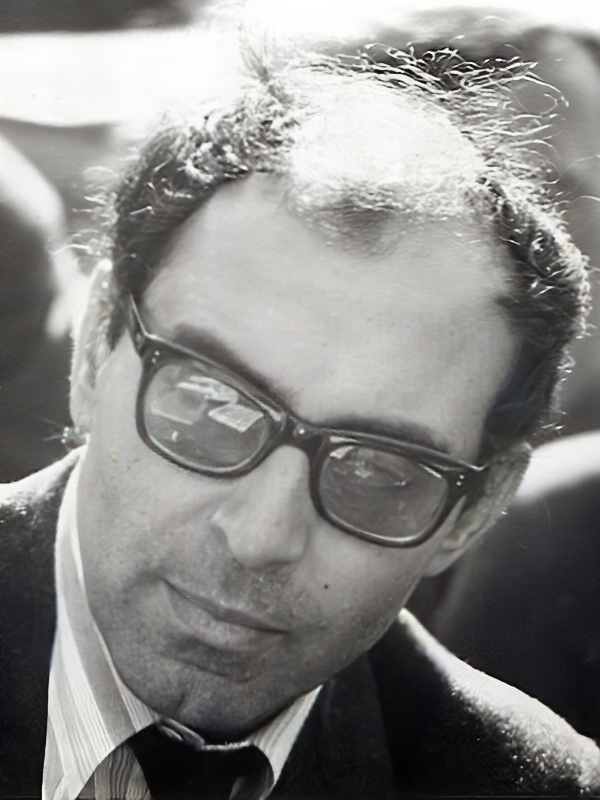
Jean-Luc Godard

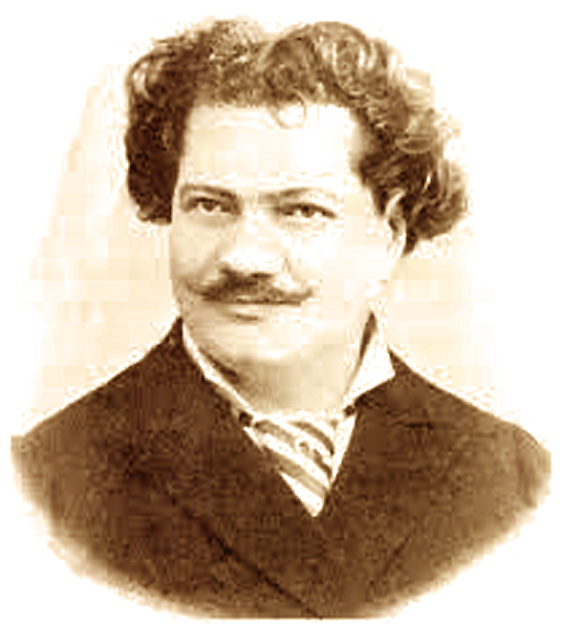
Joseph Favre

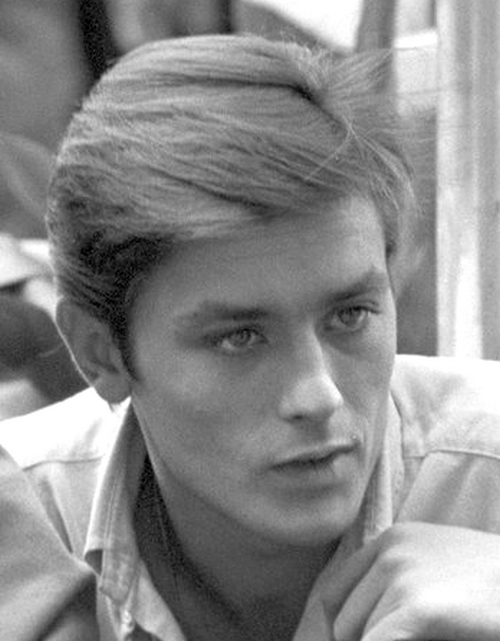
Alain Delon

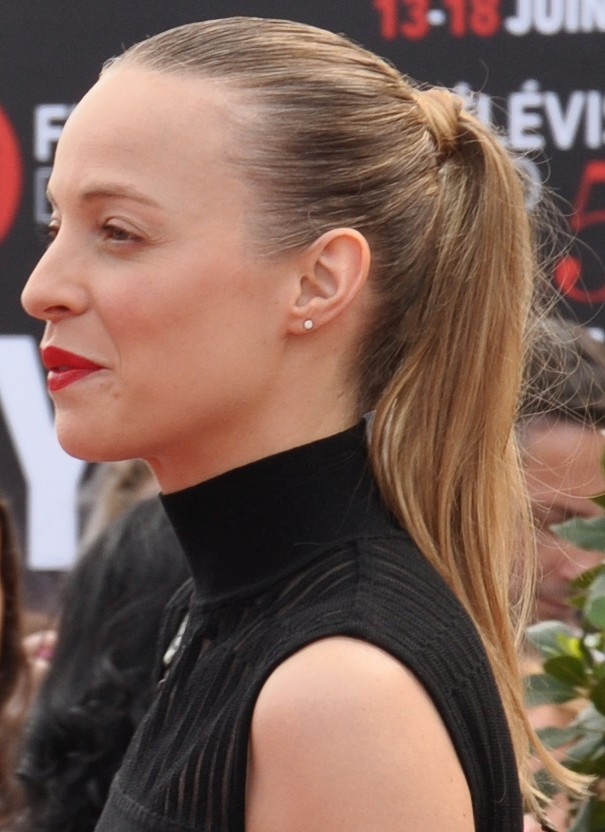
Élodie Frenck

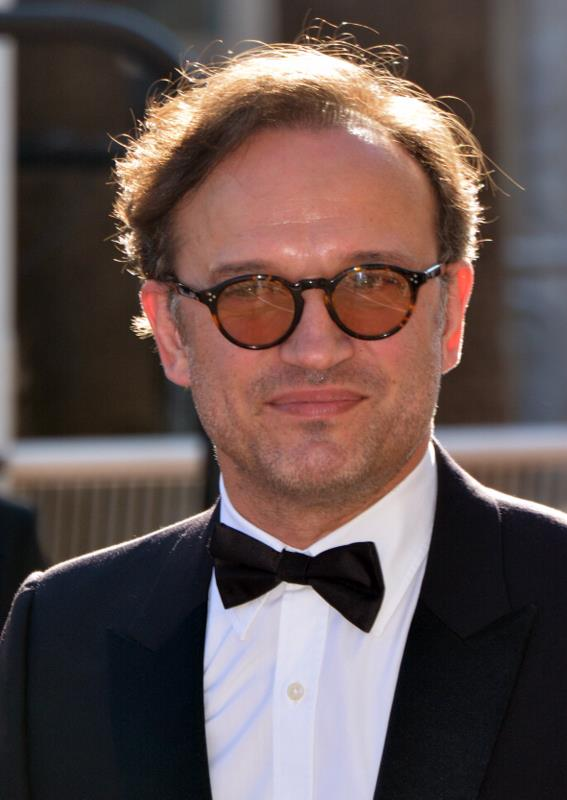
Vincent Perez

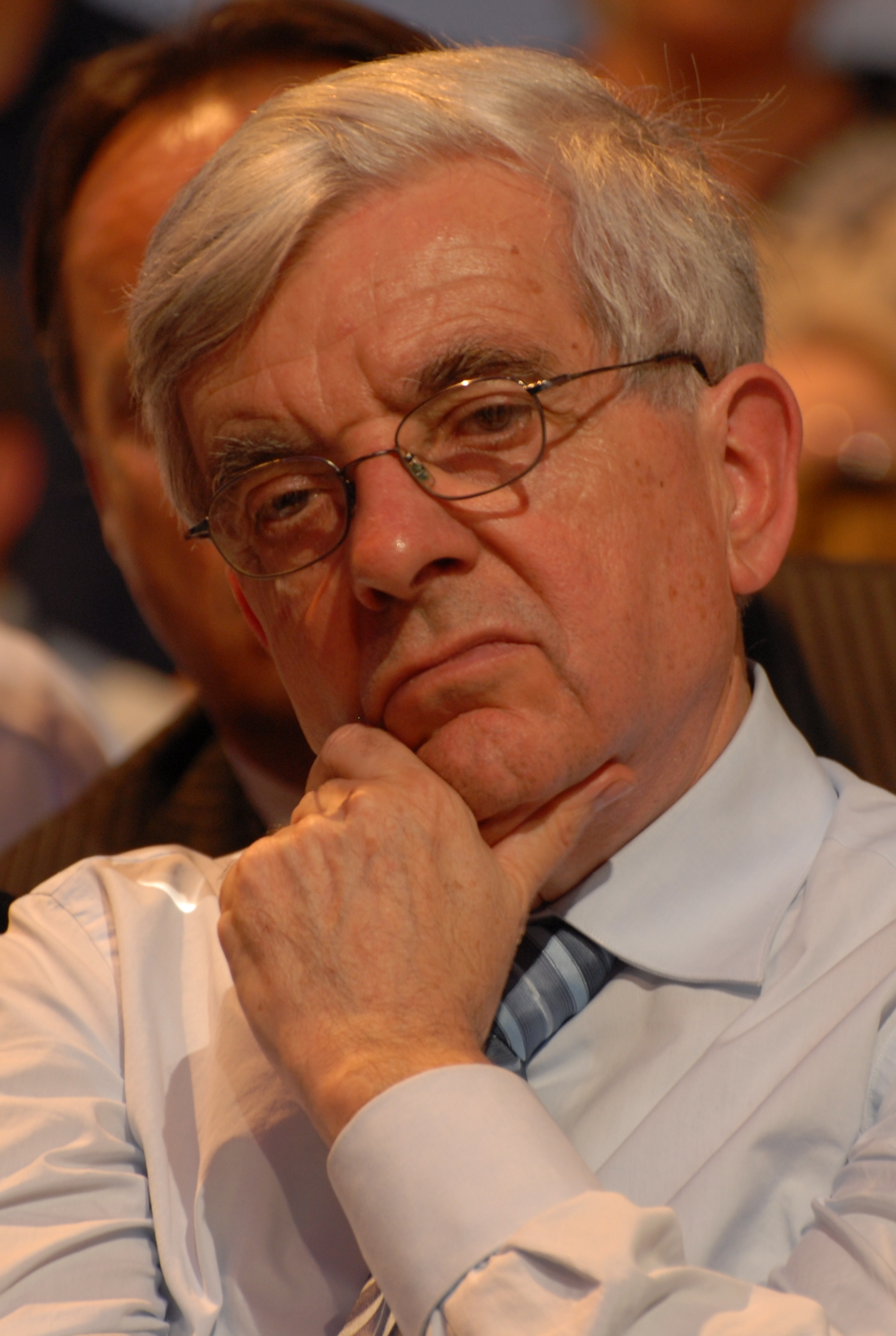
Jean-Pierre Chevènement

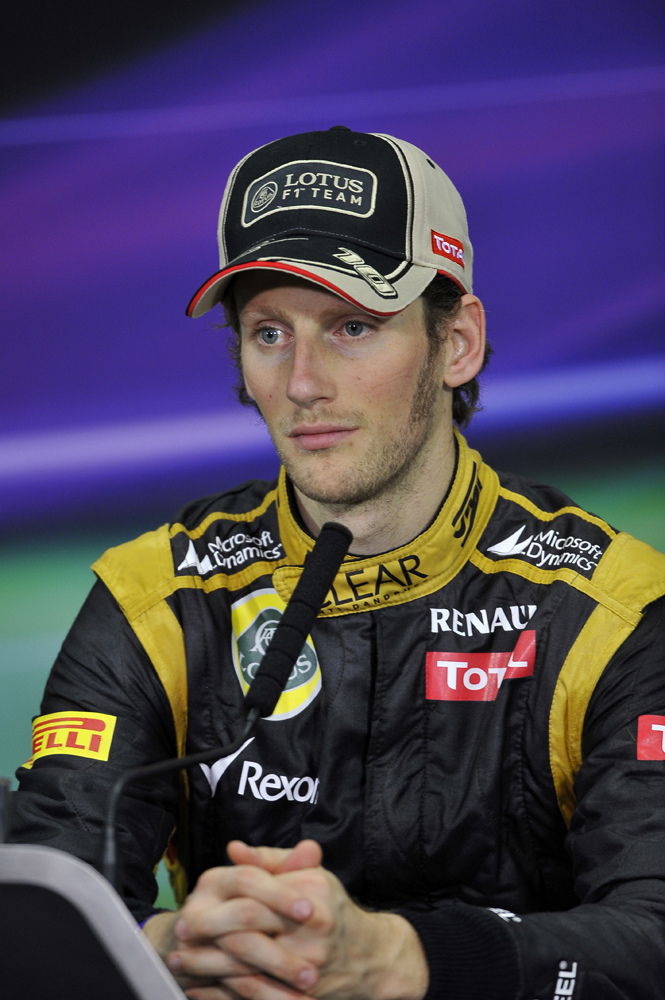
Romain Grosjean

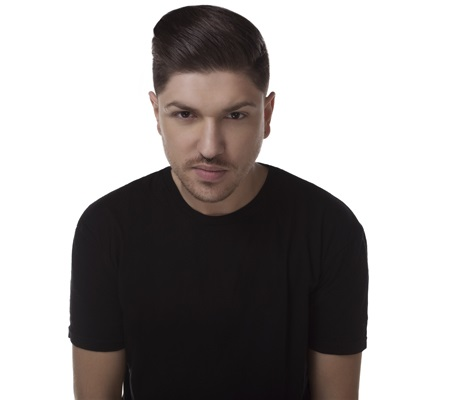
Quentin Mosimann

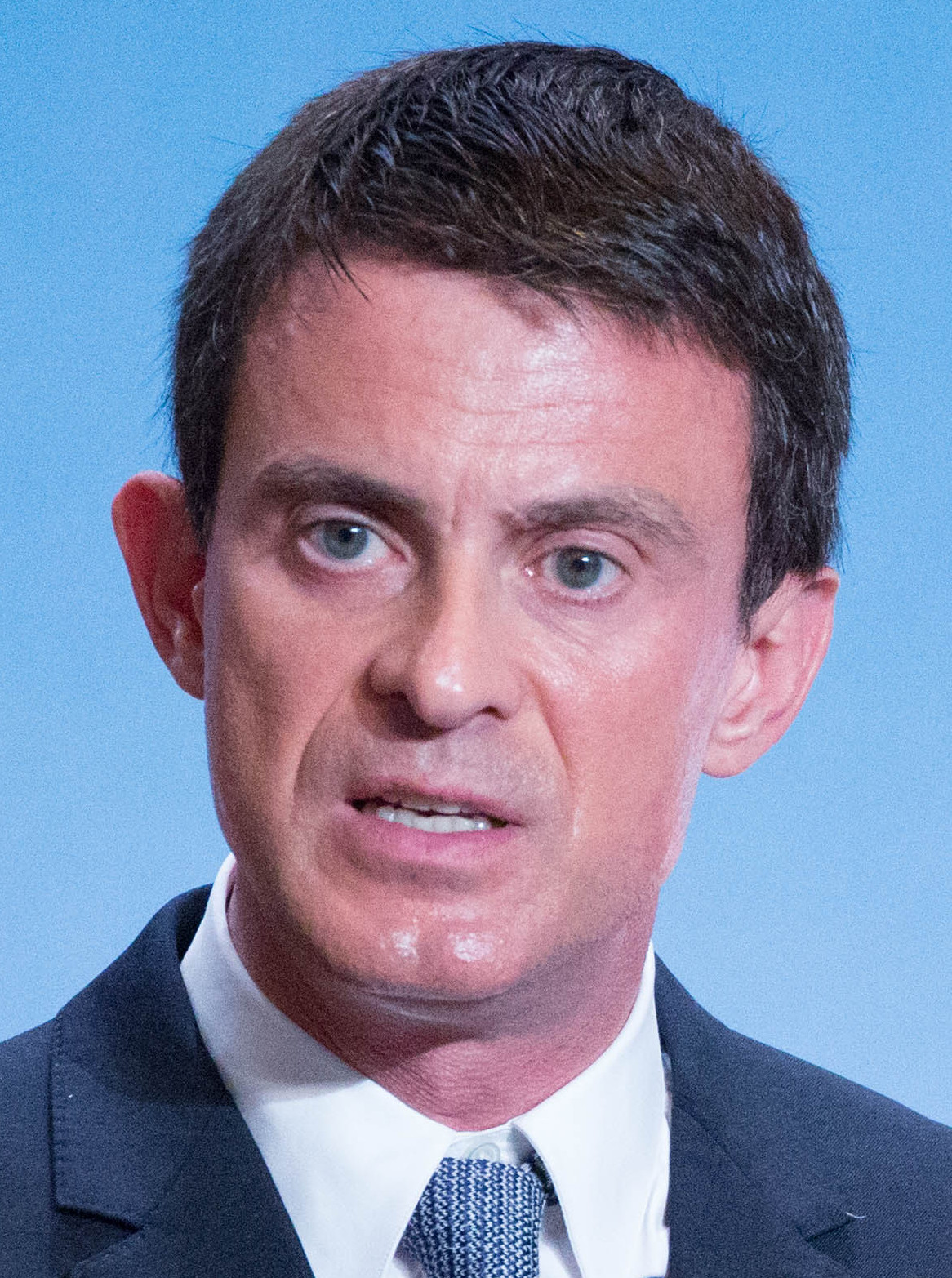
Manuel Valls

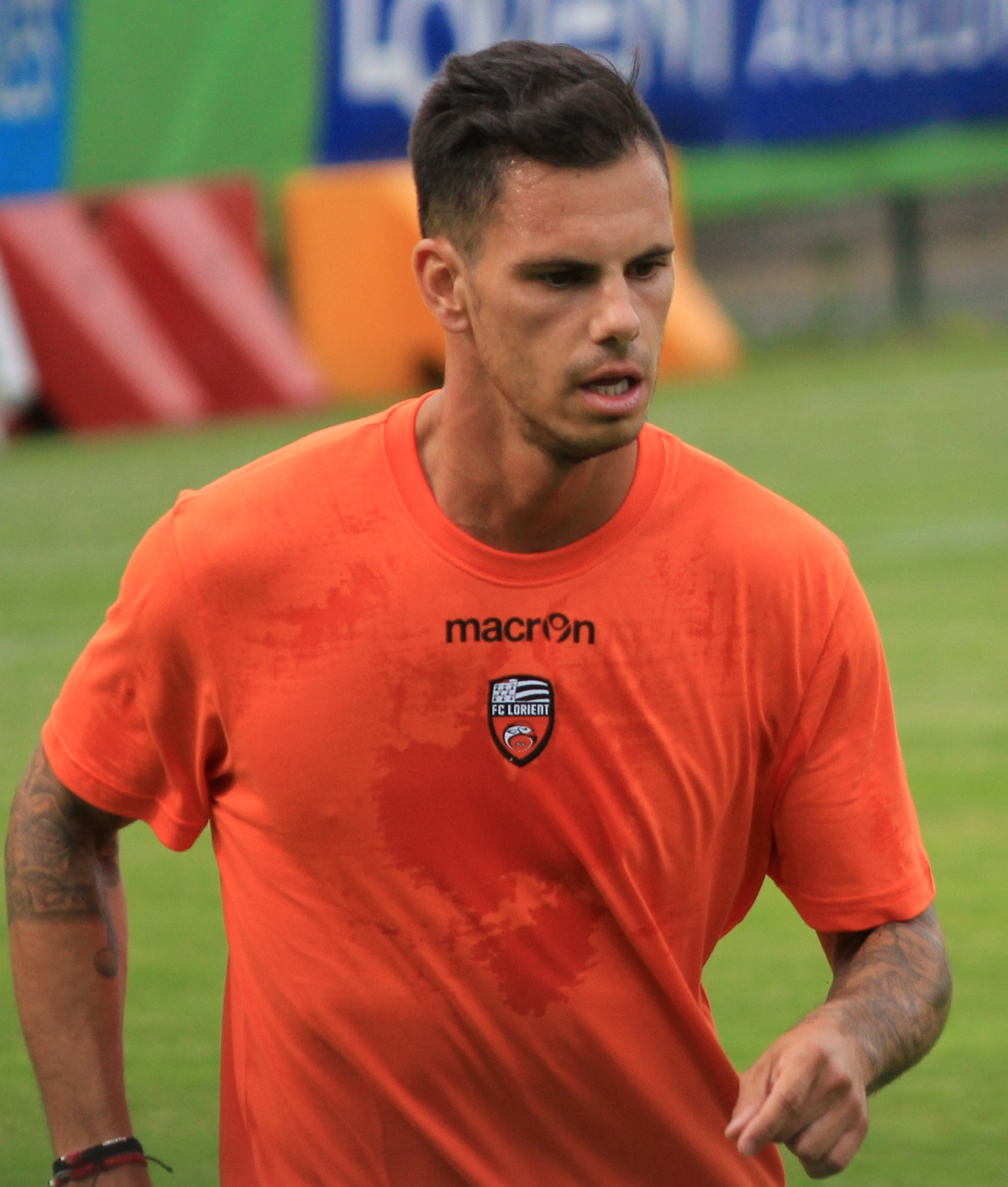
Jérémie Aliadière

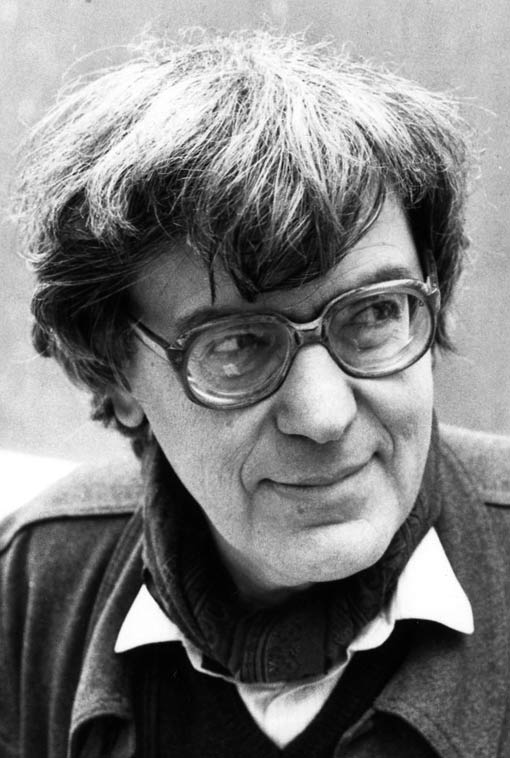
Didier Motchane

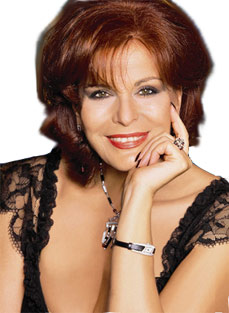
Elizabeth Teissier

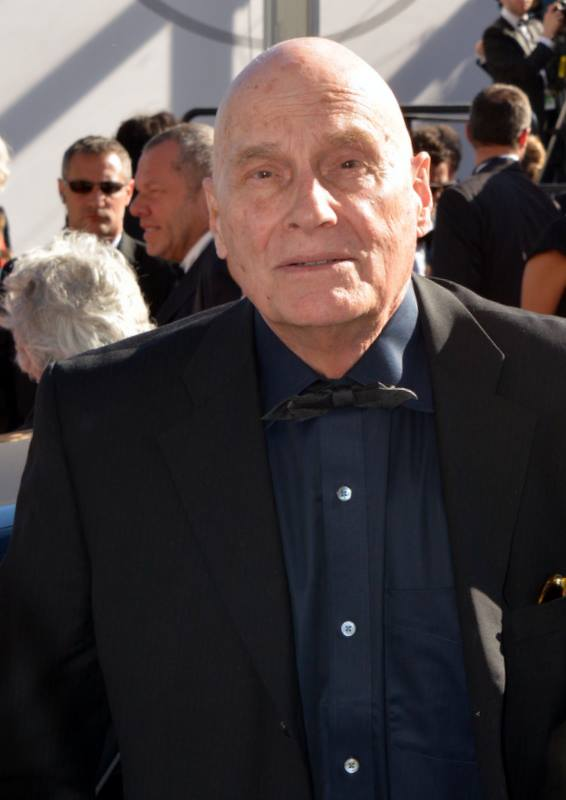
Barbet Schroeder

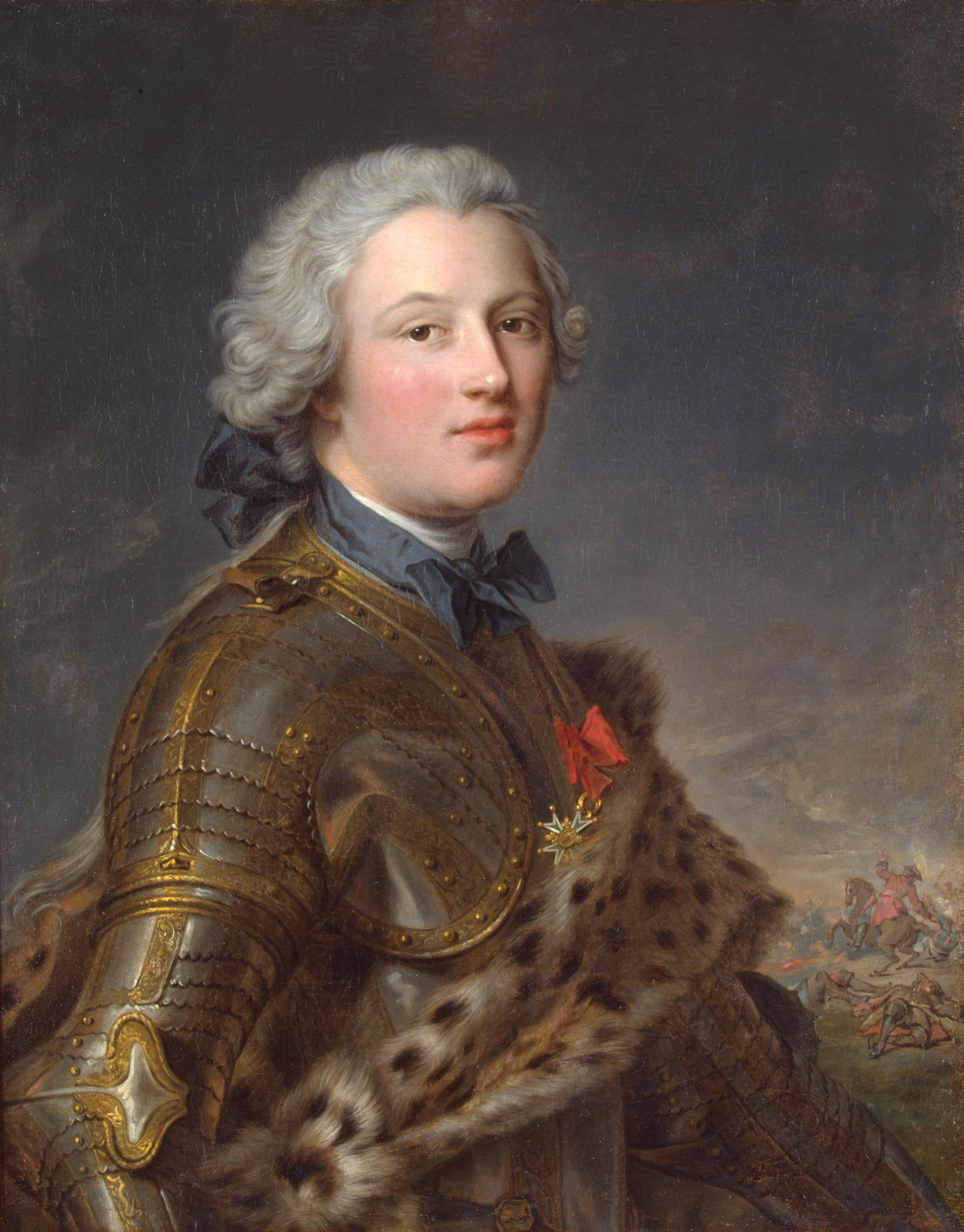
Pierre Victor, Baron de Besenval de Brunstatt

== See also ==
- France–Switzerland relations
- German French
- Swiss diaspora
- Immigration to France
