= French people in Senegal =

Ethnic group in Senegal

Total population
- 16,817 (2010)

There is a small community of French people in Senegal (French: Les Français au Sénégal), reflecting Senegal's history under France's rule as a part of French West Africa.

== Migration history ==
During the period of French rule, there were almost no official controls on settlement by French nationals into the colonies. The European community of Dakar was dominated by the French, but also including whites from outside France. The community was marked by significant divisions of social class: in particular, French men in the colonial administration looked down on the rest of the European population.

Aside from the administrators, the French population in Senegal during the period between the world wars contained rich merchant families from Bordeaux as well as smaller traders and their employees, as well as a large transient population of missionaries and travellers. French people required no identity cards or passports to travel in Senegal, making it easy to assume false identities and creating significant difficulties in policing them. Administrators expressed frustration with the influx of criminals and other "undesirables" from metropolitan France, which ran counter to what they saw as the French "civilising mission" to present "morally upright" role models for Africans to emulate.

When Senegal achieved independence in 1960, there were estimated to be 40,000 French people in the country, three-fourths in Dakar alone. Though Dakar in particular featured a far higher proportion of non-indigenous population than many surrounding African countries in which racial conflict had become apparent, inter-ethnic relations there were characterised by an "apparent absence of any colour problem" . It had been expected that most French would soon return to France after independence, but a decade later, there were still 29,000 living in the country, involved with French aid and capital investment; their presence reflected the continued dependence of France's African colonies on the métropole.

By the 21st century, Senegal had also become home to an increasing population of poor and even destitute French immigrants. Taking advantage of low-cost air travel, they arrived in Senegal as sight-seers but then remained in the country due to the relatively lax entry requirements, and cut off their ties with French society. Some of them developed health issues such as meningoencephalitis, staphylococcal infection of the skin, and the like, worsened by their failure or inability to seek medical attention.

== Politics ==
9,517 French expatriates came to polling stations in Dakar to vote in the 2007 French presidential election.

== Notable people ==
- Colette Senghor (1925-2019), first First Lady of Senegal (1960-1980)
- Viviane Wade (born 1932), third First Lady of Senegal (2000-2012)
- Léa Buet (born 1989), French-Senegalese judoka (2015 African Games)
- Jeanne Boutbien (born 1999), French-Senegalese swimmer (2020 Olympics)

== See also ==
- France–Senegal relations
- Senegalese people in France

== Bibliography ==
- Crowder, Michael (1962), Senegal: a study in French assimilation policy, Taylor & Francis, OCLC 503691
- O'Brien, Rita Cruise (January 1974), "Some problems in the consolidation of national independence in Africa: the case of the French expatriates in Senegal", African Affairs, 73 (290): 85–94, doi:10.1093/oxfordjournals.afraf.a096458, JSTOR 720983
- Keller, Kathleen (2008), "On the fringes of the 'civilizing mission': 'suspicious' Frenchmen and unofficial discourses of French colonialism in AOF (1918–1939)" (PDF), French Colonial History, 9: 103–130, doi:10.1353/fch.0.0005, ISSN 1539-3402, archived from the original (PDF) on 2012-03-24
- Perret, J. L.; Sane, M.; Mbaye, P. S.; Fall, F.; Diop, M; Jousseaume, J. F. (2000), "The new poor expatriates in the third world", Med Trop (Mars), 60 (4): 375–377, PMID 11436594
