= France–Mali relations =

- France: Mali

France–Mali relations are the current and historical relations between France and Mali.

The first significant contact between the two nations came in 1855 when the French erected a fort in present-day Médine. By 1892, Mali was declared a French colony, then called Soudan Français (French Sudan), losing any semblance of economic, political or social autonomy. Despite gaining its independence from French colonial rule in 1960, Mali has maintained close relations with France that often take the form of paternalistic economic and military interventions.

France was the former colonial overlord of Mali, then known as French Sudan, in which it ruled from the capital in Bamako. Bamako later became the capital of the newborn Republic of Mali. The two countries had a strong connection as French rule had influenced Mali in several aspects, such as the initial adoption of the French language as the main language of Mali; however, their relations have deteriorated sharply since Mali's army staged a coup in August 2020, and French was removed as the official language of Mali in 2023. Both are members of Organisation internationale de la Francophonie. There are over 120,000 Malians in France. After 2020 relations soured as the new military government turned public opinion against France. On January 31, 2022, the Malian military junta expelled French envoy Joël Meyer in protest against remarks made by the French foreign minister. In September 2025, France suspended its anti-terrorism cooperation with Mali, and returned two Malian diplomats, after the arrest of a French diplomat in Bamako, in August 2025.

== Pre-colonial period ==
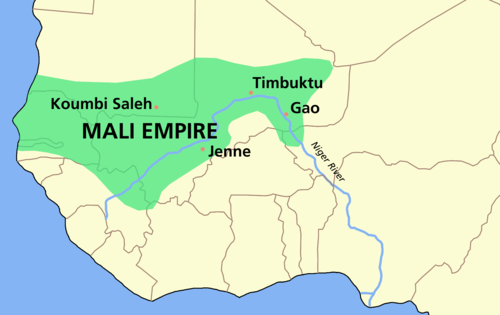
Extent of the Mali Empire (c. 1350)

In precolonial Africa, the definition of empires and kingdoms differed from that of western societies. Unlike medieval Europe, where empires and kingdoms were defined by land possession and drawn borders, western Africa empires were organized by peoples and their locations. This means that land possession was not the defining characteristic of power in western Africa –– villages often relocated due to poor soil, making it easier to understand African empires and kingdoms as groups of people under the control of a single emperor or king. Mali began as a chiefdom, expanded into a kingdom, and eventually became an empire under the leadership of Soundjata Keïta. Its command of valuable resources such as gold, copper, and salt made Mali the wealthiest empire of West Africa. Mali's pre-colonial economic history is important in understanding the events leading up to the French colonization of the Sahel region.

== Colonization ==
Though France and other European powers would come into contact with Malian traders on the Atlantic side of Western Africa, the first Frenchman to extensively document the riches present in Mali (and thus prod sentiment of French colonization) was the explorer René Caillé, who traveled inland from the Atlantic coast through the upper Niger River and reached Timbuktu in 1828. He was the first foreigner to witness the riches of city and make it out alive.

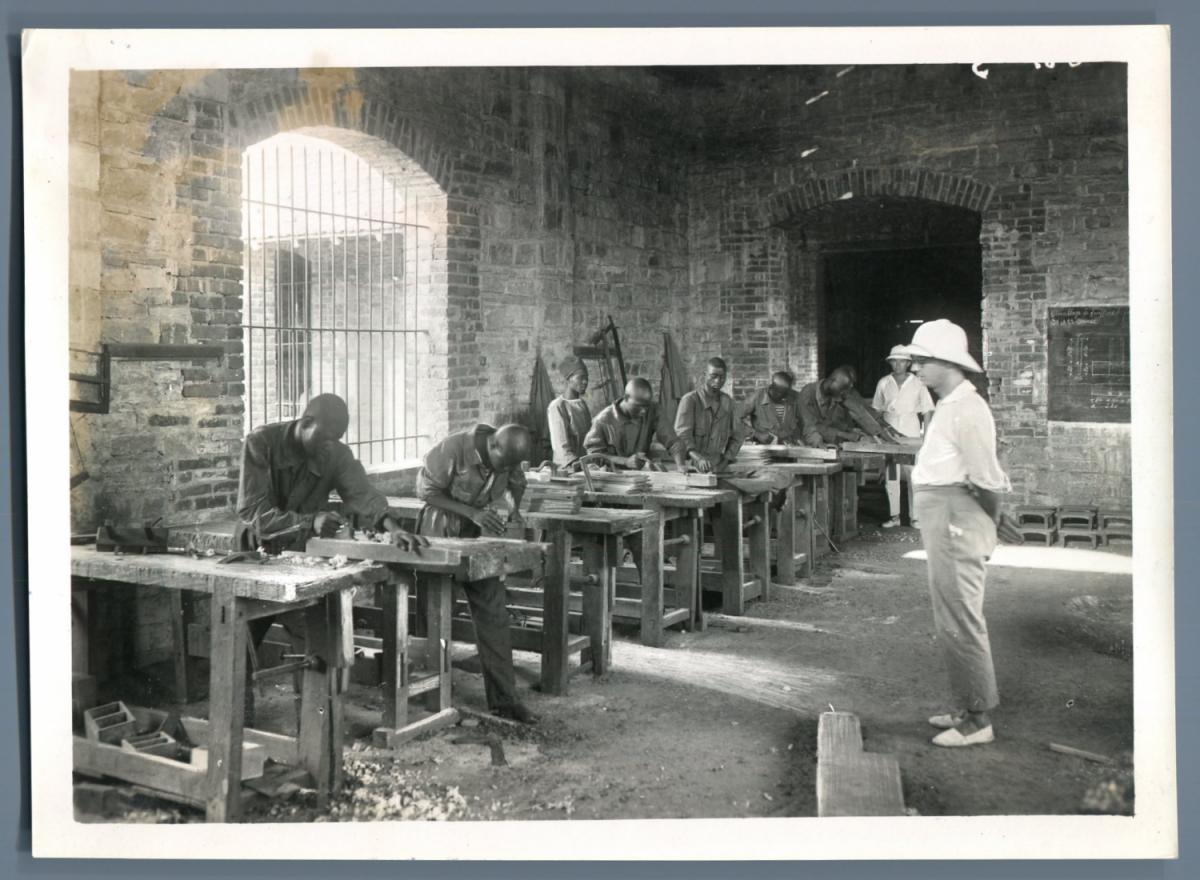
A trade school in Bamako, Mali, circa 1940.

France colonized Mali in the late 19th century as part of its larger colonial project in Africa. At the time, European powers were competing for control of African territories (see Atlantic Charter), driven by economic interests in resources –– particularly gold, diamonds, and copper in Mali –– as well as the desire to spread their political and cultural influence. Mali was a strategic location for France because of its location along the Niger River and its rich natural resources. French colonial authorities sought to exploit these resources through the establishment of agricultural plantations, mining operations, and forced labor. Other but less notable motivations included the pretense of a "civilizing mission" and France's desire to exert political and military control over the region. France established a network of military bases throughout Mali, and used its colonial authority to suppress resistance movements and maintain control over the local population.

For example, the global cotton industry during the initial period of the 1900s was remarkably unstable. Farmers from Mali frequently yielded meager or insignificant gains from their cotton harvests. In addition, as a lucrative agricultural product, peanuts generated a greater profit margin compared with cotton. Hence, Malian farmers endeavored to oppose the endeavors of colonial authorities to mandate cotton production. Nevertheless, in the 1930s, the colonial government established the Office du Niger, which implemented a scheme of compulsory labor and levies that forced Malian farmers to engage in cotton cultivation for overseas trade.

The colonization of Mali was part of a larger scramble for Africa, where European powers sought to expand their influence and control over the continent. French colonialism in Mali began in the late 19th century, when French forces began to expand their control over the West African region. Mali was part of French Sudan, which also included present-day Senegal, Mauritania, Guinea, and Ivory Coast. The French established a colonial administration and a system of direct rule, where French civil servants governed over Malians on behalf of the French. This system is often criticized for having led to over-centralization, thus a lack of administrative independence which heavily impeded the political institutions of sovereign Mali. French colonial rule as well as altering the political economy of the region, it also caused vast agricultural development projects and the introduction of legal codes and state administration that endure to this day.

== Malian independence ==
=== History ===
Following the end of World War II, many West African colonies began. During colonization, France had promised its West African subjects that they would receive rights akin to citizenry in exchange for their self-determination. The extraction of West African labor and resources during the War only exacerbated relations between the colonies. Additionally, France's post-WWII recovery required significant attention and resources from the government, leaving colonies that were promised post-WWII stimulus without the money to support its veterans, invest in education, and infrastructure. As a result, Mali, a poor country plagued by droughts, "brain-drain", and a poor export economy relied heavily on French support to kickstart its independence as a nation.

=== Mali Federation (1959–1960) ===
Following the May 1958 crisis, the colonies of French West Africa were given the chance to vote for immediate independence or to join a reorganized French Community (an arrangement which would grant the colonies some self-determination while maintaining ties to France). Only Guinea voted for full independence and the other colonies of French West Africa voted to join the French Community. After the other French colonies decided against joining the federation, (Niger, Mauritania, and the Ivory Coast on their own accord, wheres Dahomey and Upper Volta did so following French external pressure) Soudan and Senegal made up the only nations within the federation. The purpose of the federation was to improve the existing economic and political collaboration that was made compulsory during French colonial rule; federation leaders believed that better organization between trade unions, budgeting, and other economic activities would increase productivity within the federation. International bargaining would also be made easier.

Duties within the inter-territory government were split between the Premier, Modibo Keïta, and the Vice-Premier and Ministere De La Defense, Mamadou Dia. In July 1959, leaders within the federation solicited independence from France, which was granted (on the condition that France would provide "economic and technical assistance").

The unity between Soudan and Senegal was short-lasted, however, as differences as in governance split Keïta and Senegalese President Léopold Senghor. For example, Keïta preferred that the federation Africanise its bureaucracy and civil service, while Senghor favored the continuity of French civil servants over the experienced Senegalese and Soudanese. This divide was only compounded by the character differences between Keïta, a puritanical aristocrat and Senghor a theoretician more comfortable with the idiosyncrasies of French society. This, along with other factors, led to the split of the federation when Keïta was arrested and then deported to Bamako on August 20 of 1960. On September 22, the Union Soudanaise–Rassemblement Démocratique Africain; US–RDA (Sudanese Union–African Democratic Party) proclaimed the inception of a new nation, the Republic of Mali.

=== Modibo Keïta's rule (1960–1968) ===
Souring relationships with Senegal and France (particularly the closing of the Dakar–Niger Railway) incentivized Mali to construct some sort of socialist economy. Repelled by the "dead-hand" of Senegal and its bourgeoisie, Keïta remarked on how he sought to progress Mali, independent from its previous allies,

It is also my opinion that separation from Senegal has contributed to the to mobilization of the Soudanese masses. This will allow the Soudanese Republic to fully realize its political, economic, social and cultural objectives on the basis of a genuine socialism, and exclusively according to the interests of the most deprived sections of the population.

Though Keïta's rule enjoyed its successes in cultivating relationships with the Eastern Bloc and nationalizing certain aspects of the Malian economy, his emblematic personality that popularized at home centralized power to him and his entourage. This risked

Toward the end of Keïta's rule, Mali experienced growing economic stagnancy within agricultural sector which was compounded by soaring inflation as a result of imprudent borrowing practices, resulting in an economic deadlock. In a last-ditch effort to stimulate its economy, Mali reached out to France on February 15, 1967. These accords resulted in a 50% devaluation of the Malian franc and a compulsory reduction in government expenditures; there was no alternative. The terms of this intervention, though poorly received by the Malian public, were essential in preserving the influx of French economic and agricultural aid.

This marked the end of Mali's experiment with Soviet-style socialism. Under serious external pressure from France, it shifted to a more open-market economy following a bloodless coup led by 14 young army officers led by Moussa Traore.

=== Economic and political relations ===
The previously mentioned restriction on Malian monetary policy had serious effects until about 1973. The rate of growth of available credit in the Malian economy was consistently reduced (6.7 percent per year) and was much lower than monetary growth in the l'Union Monétaire Ouest-Africaine (UMOA). Compounded by a low demand for credit due to the agricultural crisis (severe drought and low interest rates), this made Mali even more dependent on French aid and trade. The monetary policy between the nations had succeeded in reducing Mali's inflation, but lost much of its economic autonomy to France. This is best exemplified by the fact that Mali's central bank lost the privilege of issuing currency to the Central Bank of Mali whose board of directors was composed of five Malian representatives and five French representatives (Franco-Malian agreements of December 19, 1967) and to which the French Public Treasury opened a transaction account. Simultaneously the commercial banking activities of the former issuing institute were taken over by the Development Bank of Mali, which was created with and financed by exterior MNCs. This monetary arrangement has enabled France to control the money supply of the CFA franc and to influence the decision-making process of the African central banks through their boards

Economists and historians focus on a second phase within the Malian economy when evaluating economic interventions in Mali. Following the coup of 1968, moderates within the Malian bureaucracy and military favored free-market economies as opposed to Keïta's more radical and internationally independent form of government. French colonialism had crippled its institutions and development and nearly bankrupted Mali.

In theory, the French government was obligated to remove its civil and foreign services from Mali in accord with the terms of decolonization. However, many French and Malian colonial bureaucrats stayed in power –– too many for the state to afford, and too controlling to reduce. Following the coup of 1968, many have speculated that France financed the opposition faction, though such cannot be proven.

=== Military interventions ===
Though the French army has provided training and weapons to the Malian army, the majority of French military intervention has happened as measure of counter-terrorism in the Sahel region.

==== Counter-terrorism ====
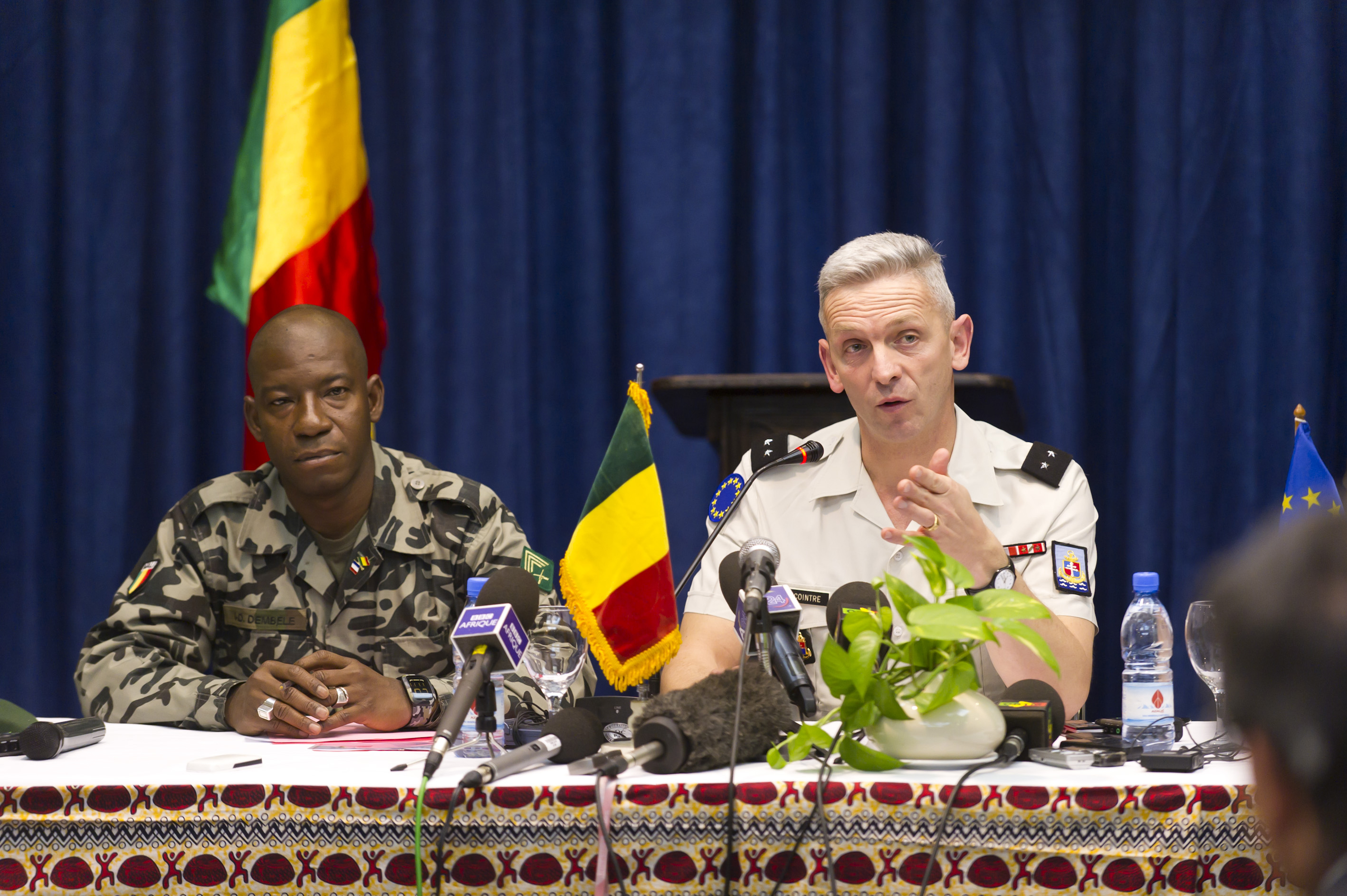
A press conference between senior French and Malian leadership at the onset of Operation Serval in 2013.

Operation Serval (French: Opération Serval) was a military campaign undertaken with he primary objective of removing Islamic extremists from the northern region of Mali, where they had initiated an offensive towards the central areas of the country. The French intervention was in accordance with the United Nations Security Council Resolution 2085 dated 20 December 2012, and a formal appeal by the Malian interim government for French military aid. It was considered a successful military intervention; Malian activism groups, government officials, as well as French scholars have reflected positively on the operation. Mathieu Guidère, a scholar of Islam and the Arab world at the University of Toulouse, said in an interview published in the newsmagazine Jeune Afrique, that without the French military intervention the state of Mali would have fallen. France's stated rationale for the operation is that to do otherwise would allow "a terrorist state at the doorstep of France and Europe."

The operation concluded on 15 July 2014, and was succeeded by Operation Barkhane, which was launched on 1 August 2014 to expand the French military's operations over a vast area of the Sahel region and continue combatting Islamist insurgents in the Sahel region.

Operation Barkhane is considered less successful than its predecessor, mainly because of the lack of military success, and partially because of the complications in withdrawing French soldiers.

As a result of the 2021 Malian Coup, French President Emmanuel Macron announced the end of the operation and his intentions to remove troops incrementally. On 18 March 2022, the military government of Mali asked France to withdraw its troops "without delay". President Macron however responded that about 5,000 French troops will leave Mali in an "orderly fashion" over the next four to six months, in order to provide protection for the United Nations Multidimensional Integrated Stabilization Mission in Mali (MINUSMA) and forces of other nations stationed in Mali.

Since 2013 and the beginning of the Operation Serval, replaced by Operation Barkhane in 2014, opinions in Mali have been divided as to the legitimacy of the French intervention. According to Mission Head for Peace in Mali at the Stockholm International Peace Research Institute Aurélien Tobie, "Between 2013 and 2015, we quickly realized, after the peace agreements in Ouagadougou and Algiers for Mali that the Malian opinion towards the French presence was changing. People were supporting the Serval Operation, but did not understand why the French presence was being prolonged with the Barkhane Operation".

The Friedrich Ebert Foundation conducted the "Mali-Meter" survey in Mali to assess the level of contentment among the populace with Operation Barkhane. The results indicated that fewer than fifty percent of the individuals surveyed were content with French military presence in the country. According to Tobie, these results are best explained by the geographical differences within the Malian population; "People in contact with the forces of Barkhane in the North of the country approve of it much more because they see changes in their daily lives. Conversely, people interviewed in Southern Mali, who are generally higher educated but also further away from the conflict zone, are much more critical of the French presence."

In recent years, Mali has witnessed widespread protests against France due to the perceived inadequacies of Operation Barkhane. The protests have been triggered by a series of factors, including allegations of civilian casualties and human rights violations by French troops, as well as the failure of the operation to bring about sustained peace and stability in the country.

One of the most significant anti-France protests occurred in 2022, when thousands of Malians took to the streets to express their anger and frustration with Operation Barkhane. The protests were sparked by the killing of several civilians in the village of Bounti, which was carried out by French fighter-jets. Though France insists that all the victims were armed jihadists, an investigation by MINUSMA revealed in March 2021 that, “the group affected by the strike was overwhelmingly composed of civilians who are persons protected against attacks under international law.” The incident fueled long-standing grievances against the French military presence in Mali and the perceived lack of accountability for the actions of French operations.

Many critics have noted France's inability to compromise on its military operations as a source of alienation and anger within the Malian population. This is compounded by the fact that the security situation has not improved since Operation Barkhane; jihadism has grown, as has the rise of communal militias that challenge the authority of local governments.

=== Other interventions ===
The French Development Agency (AFD) and Caisse des Dépôts et des Consignations (CDC) signed a strategic alliance charter in December 2016, one of the financial drivers of which is the creation of a €500 million investment fund. This fund is used to finance infrastructure projects in Africa, in various sectors (energy, telecommunications, etc.). Some critics, however, point to the fund's strategy of creating opportunities and opening the market to mostly French companies, thus feeding capital transfer bridges that are the roots of French neo-colonialism. As of November 16, 2022, France's Ministry for Foreign Affairs announced the suspension of all AFD activities in Mali.

== Resident diplomatic missions ==
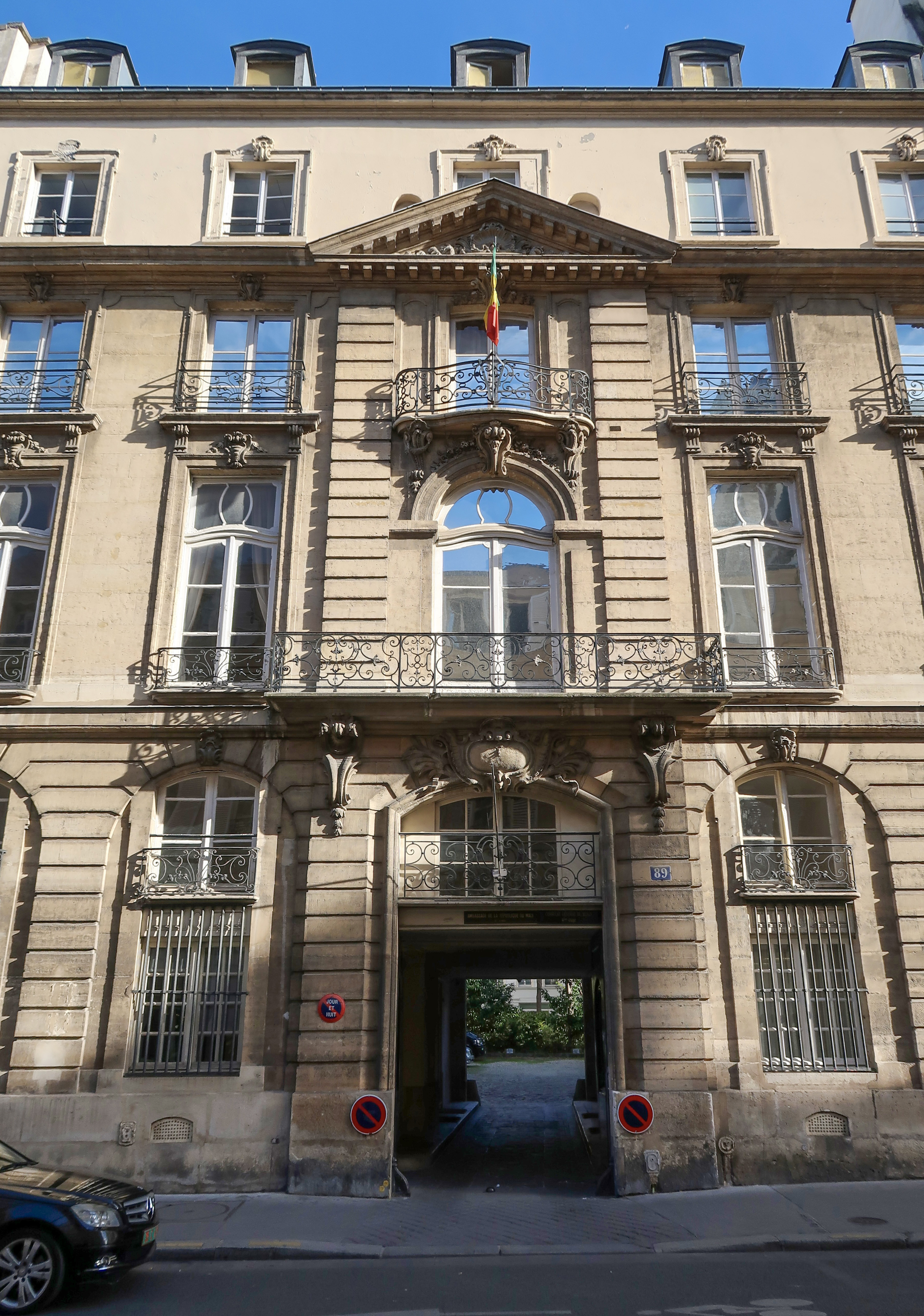
Embassy of Mali in Paris

- France has an embassy in Bamako.
- Mali has an embassy in Paris.

== See also ==
- Conseil Présidentiel pour l’Afrique
- French Africa
- African language
- CFA Franc
- Embassy of France, Bamako
- Mali War
- French Colonial Empire
