= Marieme Faye Sall =

First Lady of Senegal from 2012 to 2024

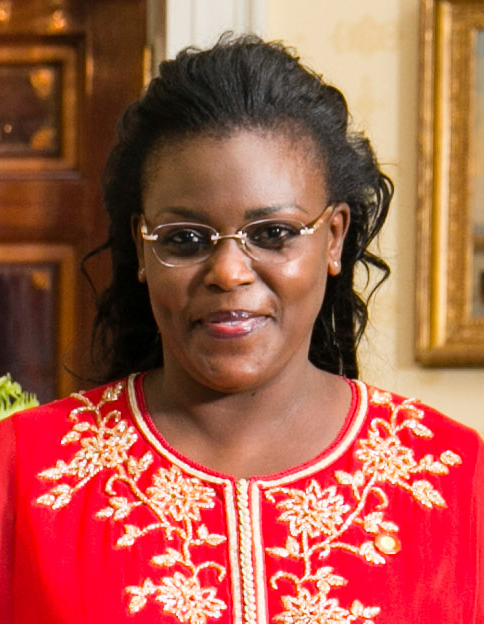
- Sall in 2014

First Lady of Senegal
- In role 2 April 2012 – 2 April 2024
- President: Macky Sall
- Preceded by: Viviane Wade
- Succeeded by: Marie Khone Faye; Absa Faye

First Lady of the African Union
- In role 5 February 2022 – 18 February 2023
- Chairperson: Macky Sall
- Preceded by: Denise Nyakéru Tshisekedi
- Succeeded by: Ambari Assoumani

Personal details
- Born: Saint-Louis, Senegal
- Spouse: Macky Sall
- Children: 3

Marieme Faye Sall, also spelled Marème Faye Sall, is a Senegalese public figure who served as the first lady of Senegal from 2012 to 2024, as wife of President Macky Sall. She is the country's first first lady to possess full Senegalese heritage by birth and ethnicity, as her three predecessors were either non-Senegalese or of mixed race.

== Early life ==
Faye Sall was born in the city of Saint-Louis, Senegal, as the fourth of her family's eight children. According to her official biography, she is of dual Fula and Serer descent. She attended primary school in Saint-Louis before moving to Diourbel, a city in the Diourbel Region of central Senegal with her family. She attended high school and graduated with a technical high school degree, she then enrolled at the Higher Institute of Technology at Cheikh Anta Diop University, where she studied electrical engineering, but did not graduate. She left Cheikh Anta Diop following the birth of her first child.

== First Lady of Senegal ==
Faye Sall met her future husband, Macky Sall, in 1992 while she was still in high school. She left her studies at Cheikh Anta Diop University in 1995 following her marriage and the birth of her first child. The couple have three children.

During her husband's 2012 presidential campaign against incumbent President Abdoulaye Wade, Faye Sall acted as a close advisor and supporter. However, she remained out of the day-to-day planning of her husband's Alliance for the Republic political party. Still, some publications close to President Wade sought to portray her as overly ambitious and pious during the campaign. Macky Sall defeated President Wade in a runoff held on 25 March 2012.

Sall became the fourth First Lady of Senegal on 2 April 2012. Sall is Senegal's first black first lady, first Muslim first lady, as well as the first fully Senegalese first lady to be born and raised in the country. Senegal's first and third first ladies, Colette Senghor and Viviane Wade (Sall's immediate predecessor), were both from France, while the second first lady Elizabeth Diouf, wife of former President Abdou Diouf, was of mixed race. She was nicknamed a "real Senegalese lady" by many Senegalese women.

Sall established the Serve Senegal Foundation during her tenure as first lady and heads the charity's board of directors.

Honorary titles
| Preceded by Viviane Wade | First Lady of Senegal; 2012–2024 | Succeeded by Marie Khone Faye; Absa Faye |
