= Palace of the Republic, Dakar =

Official residence of the President of the Republic of Senegal

Palace of the Republic
- Palais de la République
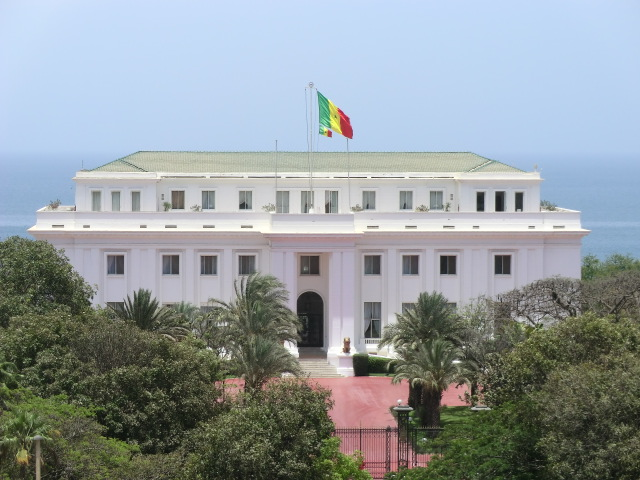
- Palace of the Republic in 2013
- Interactive map of the Palace of the Republic area

General information
- Location: Dakar, Senegal
- Coordinates: 14°40′N 17°26′W

The Palace of the Republic (French: Palais de la République) is a historic residence located in Dakar, Senegal, in the Plateau district of Dakar department. Built in 1902, it was formerly the official residence of the Governor-General of French West Africa, it is now the official residence of the President of the Republic of Senegal. The current resident of the Palace of the Republic is Bassirou Diomaye Faye, who has been president since 2024 and his wives Marie Khone Faye and Absa Faye.

The building was ordered by then President of France, Gaston Doumergue to occupy the Governor General in the capital who was then residing in Saint-Louis. The building's architect was Henri Deglane.
