= François-Joseph d'Offenstein =

François-Joseph Offenstein
- Born: 27 July 1760; Erstein, Alsace, France
- Died: 27 September 1837 (aged 77); Mouzay, Meuse, France
- Military career
- Allegiance: French Army
- Service years: 1777–1816
- Rank: Major general Brigadier general
- Conflicts: French Revolutionary Wars
- Awards: Officer of the Legion of Honor; Baron of the First French Empire

François-Joseph d'Offenstein (27 July 1760 – 27 September 1837), Baron of the Ist Empire, was a French general and military commander during the Revolutionary and Napoleonic Wars.

== Biography ==
=== Early life ===
Offenstein was born in Erstein, France on 27 July 1760 to François-Joseph Offenstein and Catherine Reibel. He grew up in Alsace during the French Ancien Régime before joining the Regiment of Royal Dragoons in Deux-Pont in the French army in 1777 at age 16. He left the regiment in 1786 and reenlisted as a grenadier in the Infantry Regiment of Alsace at the beginning of 1787.

=== Military career ===
Offenstein became a major in the National Guard in 1790 and a lieutenant colonel of the 1st Battalion of Volunteers of Bas-Rhin in 1971. In 1972 and 1973, respectively, he became the lieutenant colonel of the 1st Battalion of Volunteers of Moselle and Rhine. By July 1973, he had been nominated as a brigadier-general; in September, he became a major general. Within weeks, Offenstein was commander-in-chief of Neuf-Brisach. He served in Germany in Saarlouis and Trier. He was later relieved of his command by Nicolas Hentz and Jean-Marie Claude Alexandre Goujon after he allegedly misread a map and led troops to what he thought was a road but was actually a river. He left the army following his demotion but returned in 1796, this time as a brigadier chief in the 10th Infantry Regiment. With this regiment, he fought at Renchen, Rastadt, Neresheim, Dillingen, Ingolstadt, Kehl, and Geisenfeld. A year later, he was transferred to the 77th Infantry Regiment.

During the Consulate, he was brigadier chief of the 44th Infantry Regiment, the 12th Chasseur Regiment, and the 7th Cuirassier Regiment. In 1804, Offstein received a Legion of Honor from Napoleon I of France during its first award ceremony at the Invalides of Paris for fighting in the French Revolutionary Wars and during the Consulate. In 1805, Charles Joseph de Pully made him a colonel of the 2nd Brigade of his division in the Army of Italy. The following year, he held this role in the Grande Armée. He was wounded during the Battle of Heilsberg and was made a brigadier general by Napoleon, after which he worked with Guillaume Marie-Anne Brune as general staff. In 1809, he was made commander-in-chief of Haute-Marne and later Dordogne. In June 1809, Napoleon gave him the title of Baron of the first Empire; as such, his last name became d'Offenstein.

He served in Napoleon's military attaché at the beginning of the Bourbon Restoration but decided to retire temporarily ten months later. He returned to the army in 1815 for the Hundred Days and became commander of two lancer regiments from the National Guards of Haut-Rhin and Bas-Rhin. He was relieved from his command after only ten days when he reportedly scoffed at Napoleon. At the end of the year, he was sent to Sélestat before retiring permanently in June 1816.

=== Death ===
Offenstein died in 1837 in Mouzay, France, at age 77.

== Personal life ==
Offenstein married Marie Barbe Lamarcq in 1803. They had two sons: Guillaume François (1804–1865) and Eugène Auguste (1808–1863). He is distantly related to French physician Paul Rohmer. A street in Strasbourg is called François-Joseph d'Offenstein in his honour.
