= Karim Wade =

Senegalese politician (born 1968)

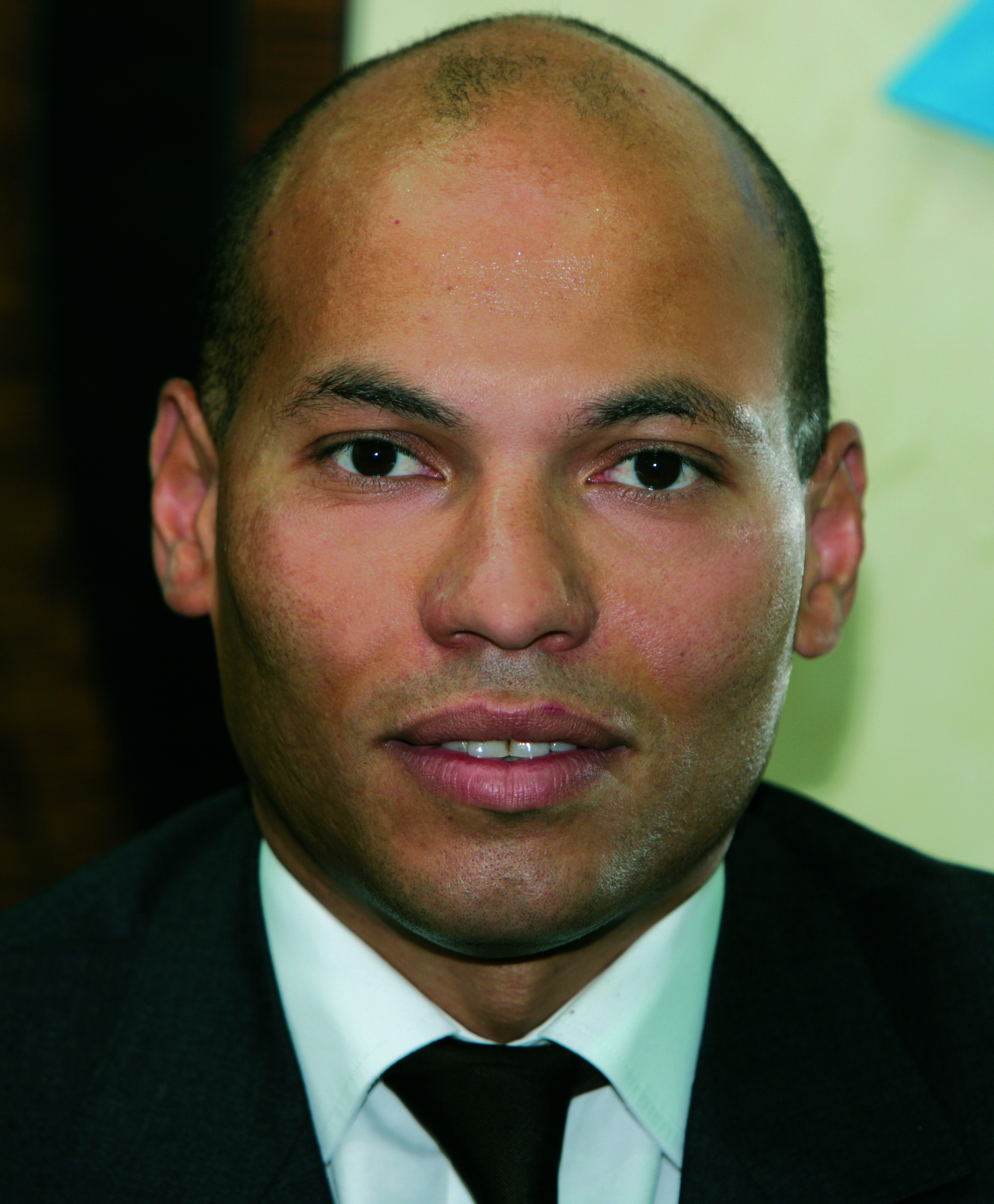

Personal details
- Born: 1 September 1968 (age 58) Paris, France
- Spouse: Karine Marteau (died 2009)
- Children: 3
- Parent(s): Abdoulaye Wade (father); Viviane Wade (mother)
- Education: Pantheon-Sorbonne University
- Occupation: Politician

Karim Meïssa Wade (born 1 September 1968) is a Senegalese politician who served in the government of Senegal as Minister of State for International Cooperation, Regional Development, Air Transport, and Infrastructure from May 2009 to April 2012. He is the son of Abdoulaye Wade, who was President of Senegal from 2000 to 2012. Before joining the government, Karim Wade was President of the National Agency for the Organisation of the Islamic Conference (Agence Nationale de l'Organisation de la Conférence Islamique, ANOCI) and served as an advisor to his father. He was widely seen as a possible successor to his father as president, and his father was widely believed to be grooming him for the position.

== Early life ==
Wade, the son of Abdoulaye Wade and his French wife Viviane Wade, was born in Paris on 1 September 1968. He attended primary school at the French-Senegalese School of Dakar (part of the les Maristes Cours Sainte Marie de Hann) and completed his secondary education at the School of Saint Martin of France, where he obtained his Baccalaureate degree.

He then attended the University of Paris 1 Pantheon-Sorbonne where he obtained a bachelor's degree in Management Science followed by a master's degree in Financial Engineering.

== Career ==
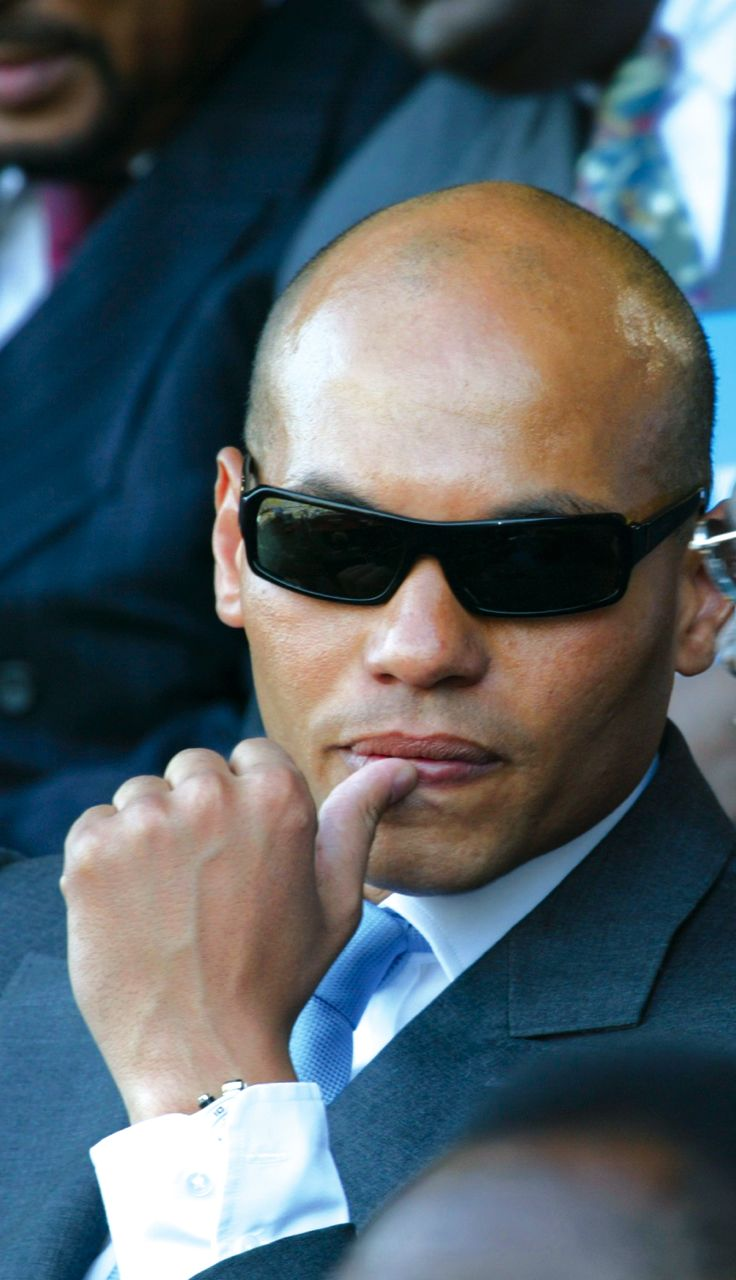
Karim Wade in 2008

Karim's father, Abdoulaye Wade, was elected as President of Senegal in the 2000 presidential election after decades in opposition. In 2002, Karim Wade was named Personal Advisor to the President of the Republic, in charge of implementing major restructuring projects, among which were the New International Airport of Diass, the restructuring of Chemical Industries of Senegal (Industries Chimiques du Senegal, ICS), and the creation of the special integrated economic zone of Dakar.

In June 2004, Wade was named President of ANOCI, whose mission was to prepare and organize the 11th Islamic Summit. The ANOCI team worked to create a so-called modern transportation infrastructure, rebuilding the Corniche Ouest, and developing public works such as the Soumbedioune Tunnel and the Northern Corridor Highway exchanges. Critics complained that Wade exceeded his budget as President of ANOCI.

On 26 August 2008, Wade met with French President Nicolas Sarkozy to discuss a project for the installation of a nuclear power station in Senegal. This would ease the problem of electrical power generation which had confronted the country for many years.

== 2009 Dakar election and ministerial appointment ==
Karim Wade ran for office for the first time in the March 2009 local election in Dakar. Although Wade won a seat as a municipal councillor, the opposition won a majority of seats and thus gained control of Dakar's municipal government; the outcome was considered to be a political humiliation for Wade. Souleymane Ndéné Ndiaye was subsequently appointed Prime Minister, and met with Karim Wade on 1 May 2009; at that meeting he offered Wade a position in the government, which Wade accepted. Later the same day, Wade was appointed Minister of State for International Cooperation, Regional Development (Aménagement du territoire), Air Transport, and Infrastructure.

Members of the opposition suggested that Wade and his father had originally planned to use local power in Dakar to position him for the presidential succession, but that the plan had been thwarted due to the opposition victory in Dakar. Consequently, according to the speculation, Wade would instead be positioned for the succession through control of a key ministry. In the press, Wade's ministry was described as the largest ever in Senegal since its independence, and Wade was compared to Ali Bongo, son of Gabonese President Omar Bongo, who was also thought to be positioned for the presidential succession through control of a key ministry. President Wade consistently dismissed claims that he was preparing his son for the succession, describing Karim as an ordinary citizen.

The office building in which Karim Wade worked caught on fire on 1 October 2009 due to an electrical problem, and Wade was rescued from the building by French and Senegalese firefighters. In December 2009, when defending Senegal's construction of a massive "African Renaissance" statue from imam claims that it was "idolatrous", President Wade compared the statue to Christian statues of Jesus Christ. Although he used the comparison to counter the suggestion that the statue was idolatrous, some Christians angrily protested his remarks, and Wade sent Karim to deliver an apology to Theodore Adrien Sarr, the Archbishop of Dakar.

In a government where decision-making was already heavily dominated by President Wade, Karim was given vast responsibilities that far exceeded those assigned to ordinary ministers, and some argued that his portfolio covered 46% of the state's budget. According to President Wade, Karim's vast responsibilities were justified by his exceptional competence. By 2010, with Karim playing a key role in government work, it seemed clear to many Senegalese that he was being prepared for the presidential succession, particularly in light of his father's advanced age (Abdoulaye Wade was 84 years old in 2010). The elder Wade's decision to create the office of Vice-President fueled rumors that he envisioned it as a mechanism through which to secure his son's succession, although he made no immediate move to appoint Karim (or anyone else) to the newly created post.

Despite the speculation, in 2010 President Wade still seemed fit and energetic for a man of his age, and he expressed his intention to stand for another term in the 2012 presidential election. Karim himself was observed to be highly deferential towards his father. In the public, there was considerable objection to the notion of a father–son succession, and Karim seemed foreign to many Senegalese, raising the question of whether such a succession would be politically viable.

President Wade expanded his "super-minister" son's already vast responsibilities even further by assigning him the energy portfolio, in addition to his others on 4 October 2010.

Abdoulaye Wade ran for another term as President in the February—March 2012 presidential election; his candidacy was controversial, with the opposition arguing that he had already exhausted the two terms permitted under the constitution. Wade was ultimately defeated by opposition candidate Macky Sall. Karim Wade consequently lost his appointed government post in April 2012, when Sall was sworn in.

=== Legal charges ===
A year after leaving office, Karim Wade was charged with corruption and imprisoned at Rebeuss beginning on 17 April 2013. He was sentenced to six years imprisonment on 23 March 2015, two days after the Senegalese Democratic Party designated him as its candidate for the next presidential election. He was also fined 138 billion CFA francs (US$228 million). Wade appealed to the Supreme Court, but the court ruled against him on 20 August 2015.

Opponents of Sall argued that Wade's imprisonment was politically motivated. He spent three years in jail before being pardoned by Sall and released from prison on 24 June 2016. He was, however, still required to pay his enormous fine. Following his release he went into exile in Qatar where he has resided since then.

=== Panama Papers ===
When ICIJ partner journalists from Ouestaf.com examined the Panama Papers they discovered documentation of the existence of secret contracts and payments between DP World FZE (DP) and Mamadou Pouye, the bribery codefendant of Karim Wade. This information was not available at their trial; Ouestaf confirmed their financial ties to the corporation for the first time during the Panama Papers investigation. Wade was sentenced in 2015 to a 6-year prison term by the Cour de répression de l’enrichissement illicite (Crei), a specialized anti-corruption court. Wade was accused of illegally amassing assets of more than $240 million, and his childhood friend Pouye was sentenced to five years for allegedly helping him. Both denied wrongdoing and the United Nations and Amnesty International said their rights had been violated at trial. Ouestaf's investigation did not address the legality of the trial.

Ouestaf did conclude that they had succeeded in tracing a payment to Pouye's oversea shell company from a subsidiary of DP.

- Pouye owned three offshore companies, Seabury Inc, Regory Invest and Latvae Inc.

- Through Seabury, a consulting contract worth €7.2 million with DP World materialized.
- Regory Invest acted as a Seabury subcontractor, and was paid €65,000 a month, according to the documents.
- A second contract for 2013-2015 to focus on DP's African holdings, and would have paid Wade and Pouye $3 million at signing; however the pair were arrested.

Seabury was set up in 2008, a year after Senegal signed a contract with DP World for rights to the container terminal at the Autonomous Port of Dakar. According to Ouestaf the documents make it clear that while Crei investigators were interested in the funds in Pouye's Monaco account, they did not know that the money was coming from his own offshore company.

== Personal life ==
Wade was married to a French citizen, Karine Marteau, and had three daughters with her. She died of cancer in Paris on 10 April 2009. Wade is a Muslim; he is a member of the Sufi Mouride brotherhood.
