= Patrice Lumumba Square =

Square in Bamako, Mali

Coordinates: 12.6349°N 7.9966°W

Patrice Lumumba Square (French: Square Patrice Lumumba) is a large central plaza in Bamako, the capital and largest city of Mali. The square has a life-size statue of its namesake, the Congolese independence leader Patrice Lumumba, a park with fountains, and a flag display. Around Lumumba Square are various businesses, embassies, including the French Embassy, and Bamako's largest bank.
