= Viviane Wade =

First Lady of Senegal from 2000 to 2012

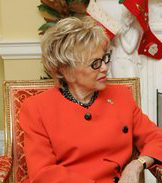
- Wade in 2006

First Lady of Senegal
- In office 1 April 2000 – 2 April 2012
- President: Abdoulaye Wade
- Preceded by: Elizabeth Diouf
- Succeeded by: Marieme Faye Sall

Personal details
- Born: Viviane Vert; 13 September 1932 (age 93) Besançon, France
- Spouse: Abdoulaye Wade (m. 1963)
- Children: 2, including Karim

Viviane Wade (née Vert; born 13 September 1932) is a French-born Senegalese public figure who served as First Lady of Senegal from 2000 to 2012, as the wife of President Abdoulaye Wade.

== Early life ==
Born in Besançon, Doubs, she was raised in France. She met Abdoulaye Wade while they attended the University of Franche-Comté in Besançon; they were married in 1963.

== Political life ==
Abdoulaye Wade later became active as leader of the Senegalese Democratic Party in opposition. Following the 1993 presidential election, in which Wade was defeated, there was some political unrest in the country and the vice president of the Constitutional Court, Babacar Seye, was assassinated. Both Abdoulaye and Viviane were arrested and imprisoned under suspicion of involvement. Those charges were later dropped, and three other people were sentenced for the murder. Following her husband's election as President of Senegal in 2000, Viviane became First Lady.

After the end of her husband's presidency, she closed down the Acting for Education and Health foundation and made the staff redundant. The couple relocated from Senegal to Paris.

Following the imprisonment of her son, Karim, on corruption charges, she supported his claims of innocence and suggested that the charges were politically motivated. Wade had been with the former President in Versailles when the charges were announced. Prior to the trial, she made weekly trips from Paris to Dakar to visit her son; she had been staying in France to look after his three daughters due to the death of their mother. Wade attended all the sessions of his trial, while her husband did not in order not to lend legitimacy to the proceedings.

Honorary titles
Preceded by Elizabeth Diouf	First Lady of Senegal; 2000–2012	Succeeded by Marieme Faye Sall
