= Ivorians in France =

National minority in France

Total population
- 94,400

Regions with significant populations
- Paris, Marseille

Languages
- French, Ivorian languages

Religion
- Christianity, Islam, Animism

Related ethnic groups
- Black people in France, Afro-French, Guineans in France, Malians in France, Ghanaians in France

Ivorians in France consist of migrants from Ivory Coast and their descendants living and working in France. They are one of many Sub-Saharan diaspora groups based in France.

== History ==
Prior to 1990, immigration from the Ivory Coast to France was very limited. It was mostly students and businessmen who wanted to return to Ivory Coast. But with the economic crisis and the politic instability of their home country, many chose to remain in French banlieue and the Ivorian population increased.

== Notable people ==
- Isabelle Boni-Claverie, author, screenwriter, and film director
- Fababy, rapper, singer, and songwriter
- Erwan Kepoa Falé, actor
- Christina Goh, singer, songwriter, and poet
- H Magnum, rapper
- Kaaris, rapper, record producer, and composer
- Keiona, ballroom dancer and drag queen
- Manu Katche, drummer and songwriter
- Gabriela Kouassi, heptathlete
- Laylow, rapper
- Jessi M'Bengue, model, actress, and singer
- Sabine Pakora, actress
- Karidja Toure, actress
- Mami Watta, drag queen
- Dan-Axel Zagadou, footballer
- Basile Boli, footballer
- Vegedream, rapper
