= Malians in France =

Total population
- 150,000 (2023)

Regions with significant populations
- Paris, Montreuil-sous-Bois

Languages
- French, Bambara

Religion
- Majority Sunni Islam

Related ethnic groups
- Black people in France, Afro-French, Senegalese people in France, Guineans in France, Ivorians in France, Algerians in France, Mauritanians in France

Malians in France (French: Maliens en France) are people of Malian origin who live in France. They are one of many diaspora groups represented in France as a result of the French colonial empire.

== History ==
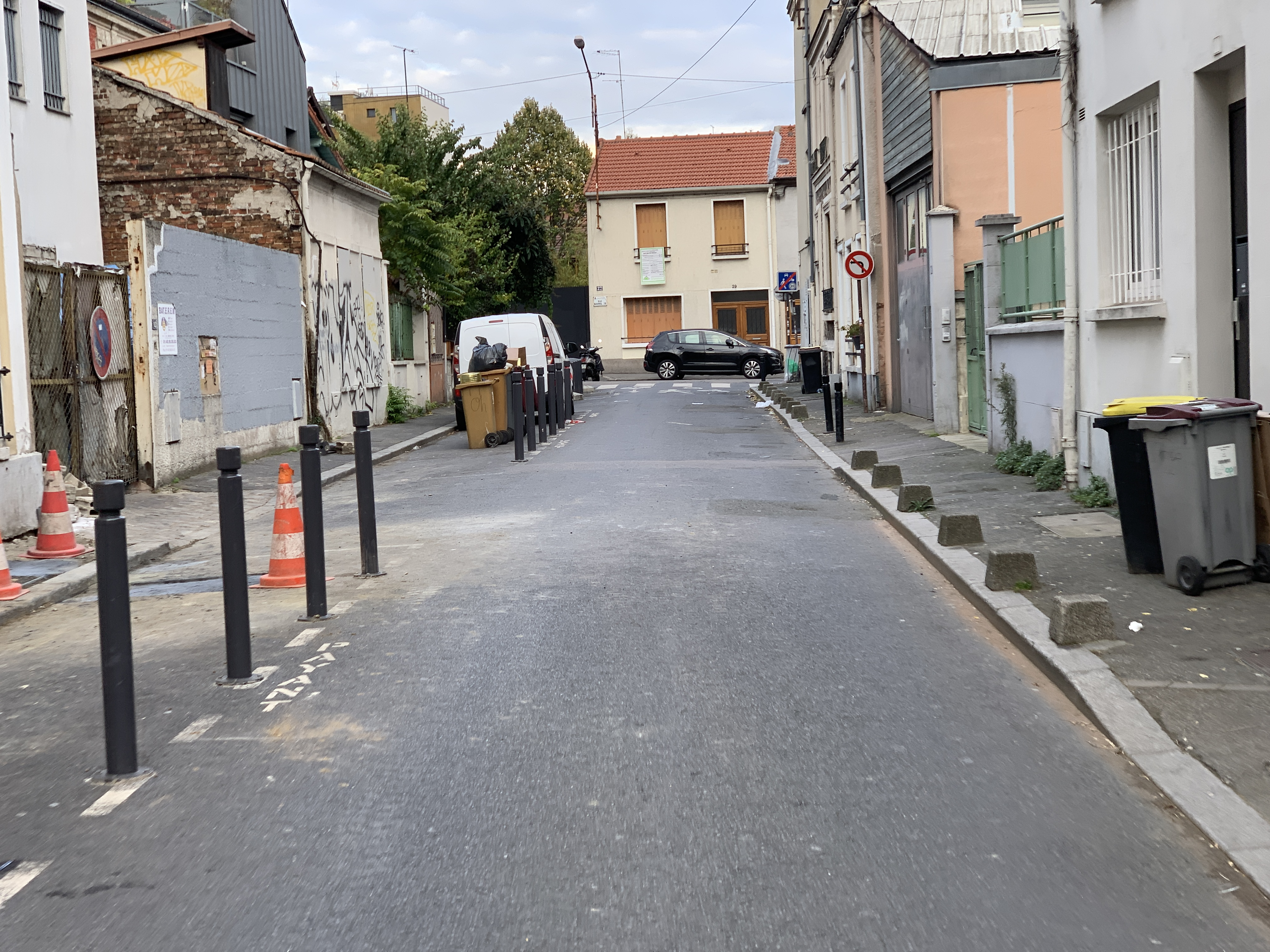
Rue Bara, Montreuil

Malian presence in France dates back as early as the mid-1900s when Mali was still a French colony. Many Malians emigrated from the Senegal River area and from the economically disadvantaged Kayes Region in the south of Mali. Laborers from Mali would travel to France under a system of rotating migration called noria, staying in France for a few years before returning home, although this system was disrupted by a closure of the French borders in 1974 that led many migrant laborers to make more long-term residence in France. Malian immigrants in France send money home and create village solidarity funds which invest in the construction of mosques, schools, health centers, and other needed infrastructure in Mali.

The number of Malians in France has remained relatively steady. In 2023, 150,000 Malians officially registered with their nation's French consulate, with potentially higher numbers if undocumented immigrants, joint nationals, and second- and third-generation Malians are included. (Note: Compare with 2005 and 2013 estimates of 120,000 Malians residing in France.) Malians in France often occupy densely packed residences in the vicinity of Paris, organized into rooms and floors by village of origin, particularly in Montreuil, Seine-Saint-Denis. Malian ministers visiting Paris rarely miss the chance to visit the Bara residence in Montreuil, the historic political heart of the Malian diaspora.

== Challenges ==
French immigration policy poses a challenge to Malians in France. In 2005, tensions rose after fires at crowded Paris apartments and hotels killed nearly 50 African immigrants, a majority of whom were children and many of whom came from Mali. The Paris authorities responded by stepping up evictions from substandard housing, angering many in the Malian community who were convinced that the fires were actually arson. On 22 May 2006, then-Minister of the Interior Nicolas Sarkozy visited Bamako to discuss new immigration restrictions; many Malians looking for work began instead immigrating to the United States. Malians in France are also troubled by unrest at home, including jihadist insurgents and economic crisis.

Since the 2020 Malian coup d'état, tensions between Mali and France have curbed immigration. In 2022, France suspended state development aid for Mali due to the actions of the Wagner Group, following which Mali banned the activities of NGOs funded or supported by France. France and Mali both suspended the issuance of visas to citizens of the other country in 2023.

== Notable people ==
- Ousmane Dembélé, footballer
- Moussa Sissoko, footballer
- Mohamed Sissoko, footballer
- Moussa Sylla, footballer
- Yacouba Sylla, footballer
- Moussa Diaby, footballer
- Moussa Dembele, footballer
- N'Golo Kanté, footballer
- Aya Nakamura, singer
- Aïssatou Tounkara, footballer
- Kadidiatou Diani, footballer
- Djibril Sidibé, footballer
- Alassane Pléa, footballer
- Ibrahima Konaté, footballer

== See also ==
- France-Mali relations
