= Paul Rohmer =

French physician (1876–1977)

- Born: 1 November 1876; Huttenheim, Alsace-Lorraine, then Germany, now France
- Died: 2 March 1977 (aged 100); Strasbourg, France
- Known for: Traité de Pathologie Infantile
- Spouse: Marie Louise Kieffer
- Children: Laurent, Anne-Marie, Marie-Thérèse
- Awards: Officer of the Legion of Honour, Commander of the National French Order of Merit, Commander of the Order of the Crown (Belgium), Knight of the Order of Léopold (Belgium)
- Scientific career
- Fields: Paediatric medicine
- Institutions: French Medicine College of Strasbourg; paediatric clinic, University of Strasbourg

Paul Rohmer (1 November 1876 – 2 March 1977) was an Alsacian physician considered the father of modern paediatrics in eastern France after World War I.

== Life ==
Rohmer was born in Huttenheim, Alsace-Lorraine, part of the German Empire, to the farmer Albert Rohmer (1846–1912) and Marie-Elizabeth Metz (1850–1935). He became a physician after passing his thesis in Strasbourg in 1901. He worked some years in Cologne and Marburg inside Germany, and militated rapidly in order that paediatrics integrate medicine progress and social education of young mothers.

During World War I, Rohmer was a German MD officer at the military hospital of Metz. Some of his famous Prussian colleagues asked him to sign the Manifesto of the Ninety-Three in 1914, but his pro-French feelings made him refuse to sign it. After the Allies victory in 1918, he became the first Professor of Paediatrics at the French Medicine College of Strasbourg, which became part of France again after the war.

In 1920, Rohmer created the "Alsatian and Lorrainian Association of Nursery", the first one in France. The impacts of the work of this association were so huge that in 1945, more were created in France, on this model, the "National Mother and Childhood Protection" (also known as PMI (in French)).

Rohmer was a pioneer in research into prematurity, poliomyelitis, tuberculosis, osteomalacia and vitamin C. He was the director of the paediatric clinic of Strasbourg until his retirement in 1947, and made it famous all around Europe. In 1946, he wrote with Robert Debré a famous manual entitled "Traité de Pathologie Infantile" (2,500 pages, two volumes) which became a reference for a whole generation of paediatricians. During his career, he was the physician of famous children, including those of the King of Belgium, of Konrad Adenauer, and of Pierre Pflimlin.

Despite his retirement at age 70 in 1947, Rohmer continued until age 99 to participate actively to his research dealing with childhood and teenagers. He died in Strasbourg in 1977. A street in the city is now called "Pr Paul Rohmer" to honor him.

== Family ==
In February 1904, Rohmer married Marie Louise Kieffer (1880–1962), with whom he had three children: Laurent (in 1904), Anne-Marie (in 1906), and Marie-Thérèse (in 1908). The third child died a few weeks after her birth due to an unknown infection. This reinforced the single-mindedness of Rohmer to fight against the birth-death rate and prematurity.

Rohmer has a family connection with François-Joseph Offenstein (1760–1837), a general during the Napoleonic Wars and the First French Empire.

== Honour ==
- A street of Strasbourg is called "Pr Paul Rohmer" to honor him.
- Officer of the Legion of Honor
- Commander of the National French Order of Merit
- Commander of the Order of the Crown (Belgium)
- Knight of the Order of Léopold (Belgium)
- Many others European distinctions

== Books & References ==
- On Paul Rohmer :
- By Paul Rohmer :
  - "Traité de Pathologie infantile", by Paul Rohmer and Robert Debré, 1946, 2500 pages, Volume I et II
  - "Über Knochenbildung in verkalkten endocarditischen und endarteriitischen Herden" , by Paul Rohmer, (October 1901), Springer Berlin / Heidelberg, ISSN 0945-6317
