= Erstein =

Erstein Eerstain
- Commune
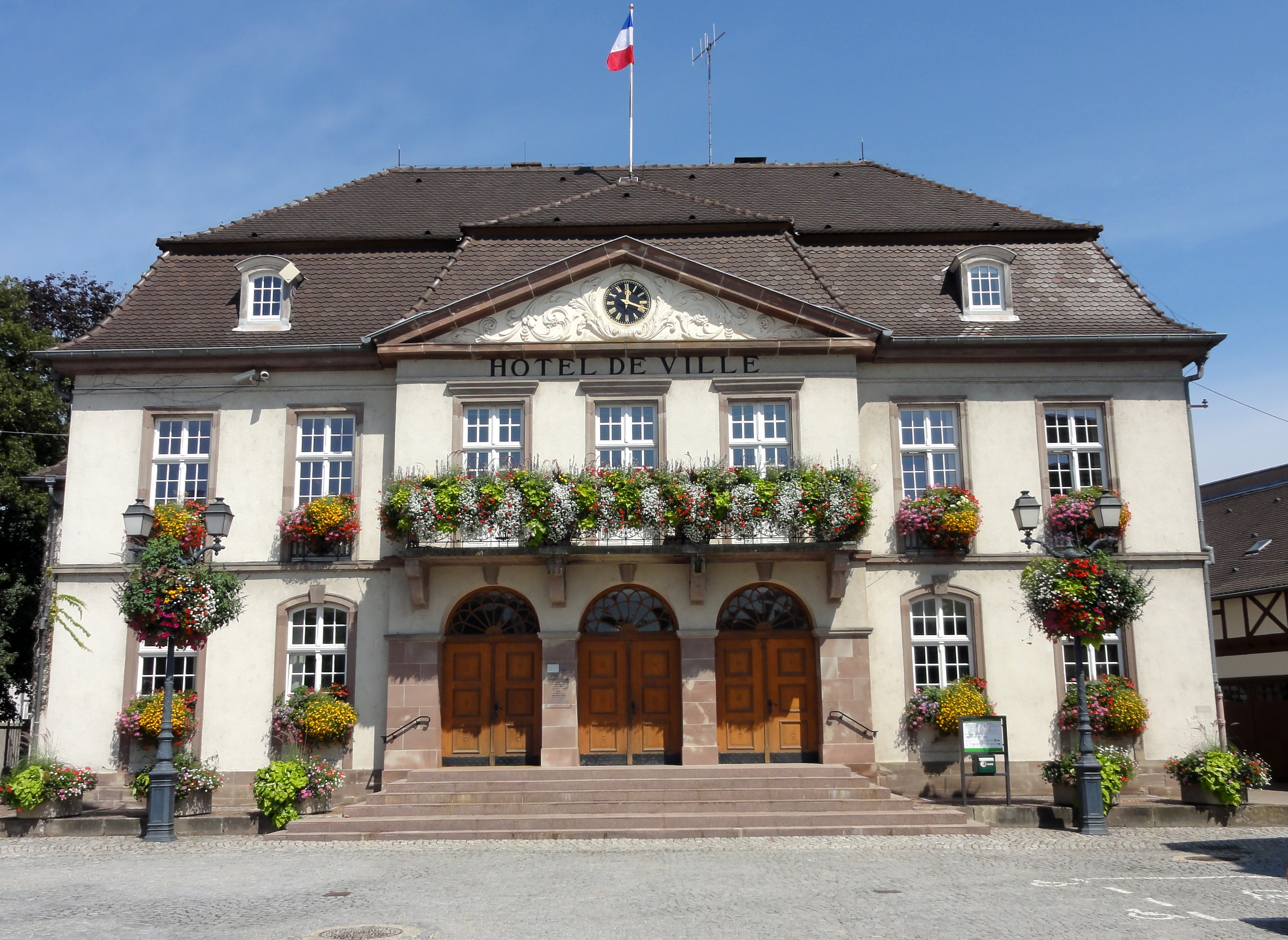
- The town hall in Erstein

- Coat of arms
- Location of Erstein
- Location within France Location within Grand Est
- Coordinates: 48°25′N 7°40′E
- Country: France
- Region: Grand Est
- Department: Bas-Rhin
- Arrondissement: Sélestat-Erstein
- Canton: Erstein
- Intercommunality: CC Canton d'Erstein

Government
  - Mayor (2022–2026): Benoît Dintrich
- Area^{1}: 36.22 km^{2} (13.98 sq mi)
- Elevation: 150 m (490 ft)
- Highest elevation: 157 m (515 ft)
- Lowest elevation: 147 m (482 ft)
- Population (2023): 10,790
  - Density: 297.9/km^{2} (771.6/sq mi)
- Time zone: UTC+01:00 (CET)
  - Summer (DST): UTC+02:00 (CEST)
- INSEE/Postal code: 67130 /67150
- ^{1} French Land Register data, which excludes lakes, ponds, glaciers > 1 km^{2} (0.386 sq mi or 247 acres) and river estuaries.

Erstein (German pronunciation: [ɛɐ̯ˈʃtaɪ̯n], French: [ɛʁʃtajn]; Alemannic: Eerstain) is a commune in the Bas-Rhin department, in the region of Grand Est, France.

== History ==
An important necropolis from the Merovingian era (6th-7th century) has been excavated near Erstein in 1999–2000.

Erstein was known in Alsace in the Middle Age for its canonesses monastery, founded in the 9th century and abandoned in 1422. The buildings were destroyed in the 16th and 19th centuries.

== Demographics ==
Historical population

| Year | Pop. | ±% p.a. |
|---|---|---|
| 1793 | 2,504 | — |
| 1800 | 2,344 | −0.94% |
| 1806 | 3,168 | +5.15% |
| 1821 | 3,440 | +0.55% |
| 1831 | 3,613 | +0.49% |
| 1836 | 3,564 | −0.27% |
| 1841 | 3,445 | −0.68% |
| 1846 | 3,585 | +0.80% |
| 1851 | 3,688 | +0.57% |
| 1856 | 3,604 | −0.46% |
| 1861 | 3,705 | +0.55% |
| 1866 | 3,899 | +1.03% |
| 1871 | 3,703 | −1.03% |
| 1875 | 3,662 | −0.28% |
| 1880 | 4,127 | +2.42% |
| 1885 | 4,378 | +1.19% |
| 1890 | 4,807 | +1.89% |
| 1895 | 5,270 | +1.86% |
| 1900 | 5,593 | +1.20% |

| Year | Pop. | ±% p.a. |
|---|---|---|
| 1905 | 5,837 | +0.86% |
| 1910 | 6,061 | +0.76% |
| 1921 | 5,485 | −0.90% |
| 1926 | 5,549 | +0.23% |
| 1931 | 5,649 | +0.36% |
| 1936 | 5,640 | −0.03% |
| 1946 | 5,539 | −0.18% |
| 1954 | 5,747 | +0.46% |
| 1962 | 6,165 | +0.88% |
| 1968 | 6,288 | +0.33% |
| 1975 | 7,434 | +2.42% |
| 1982 | 8,095 | +1.22% |
| 1990 | 8,600 | +0.76% |
| 1999 | 9,664 | +1.30% |
| 2007 | 9,971 | +0.39% |
| 2012 | 10,764 | +1.54% |
| 2017 | 10,630 | −0.25% |
| 2023 | 10,790 | +0.25% |

Source: EHESS and INSEE (1968-2023)

== Twin towns ==
- (Germany) Endingen am Kaiserstuhl
- (Portugal) São João de Loure
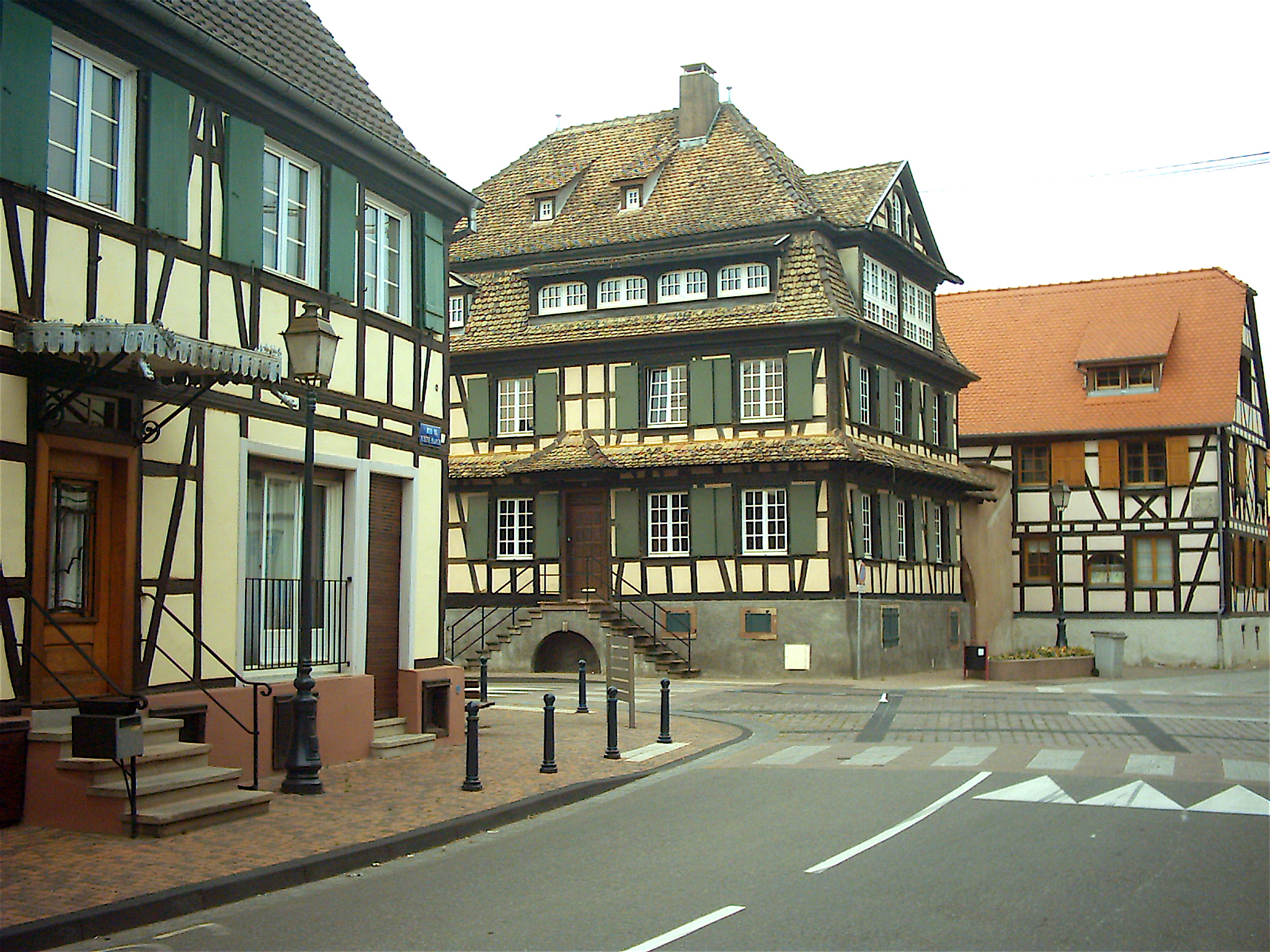
Erstein Street

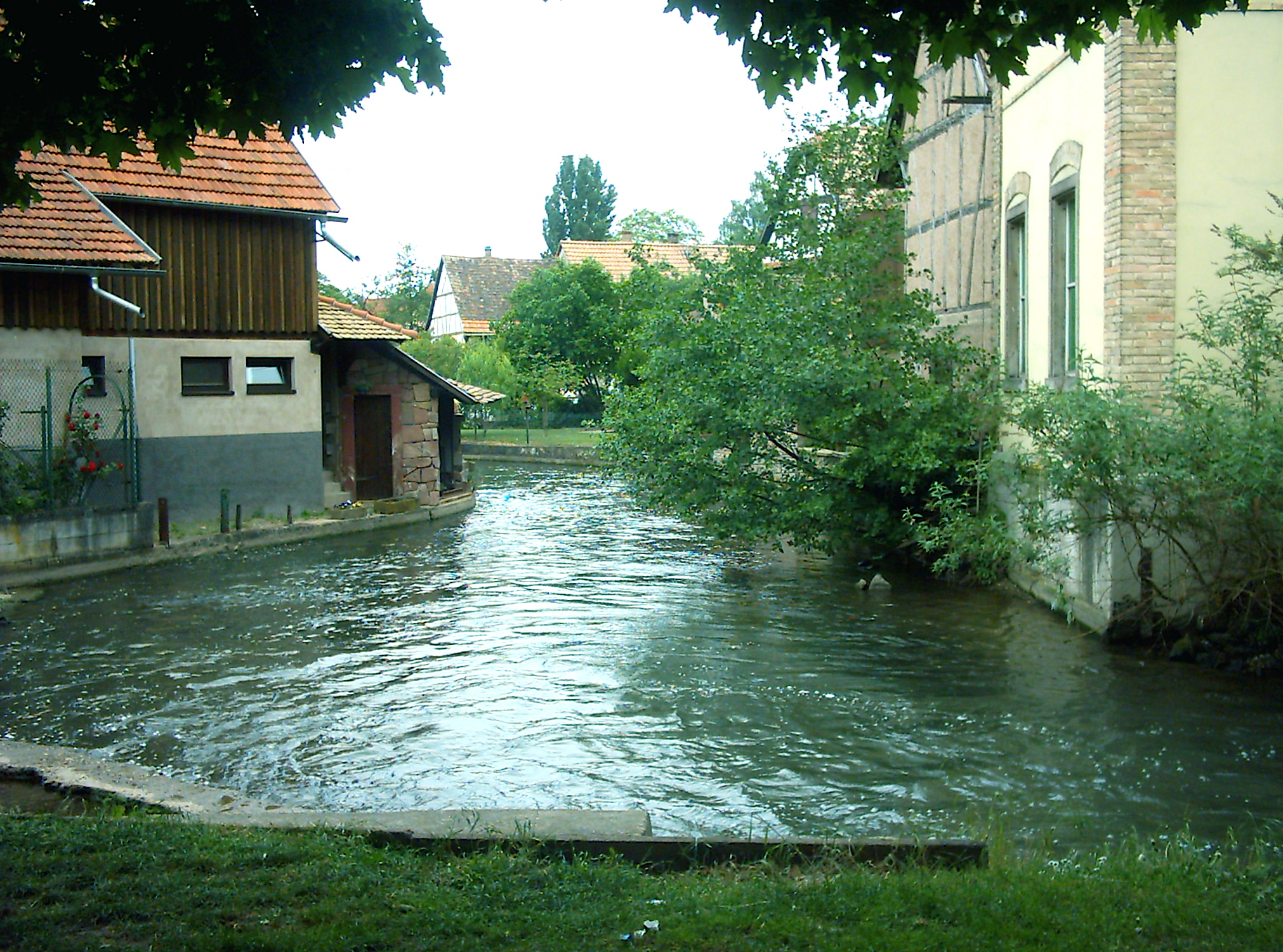
Near Ill River

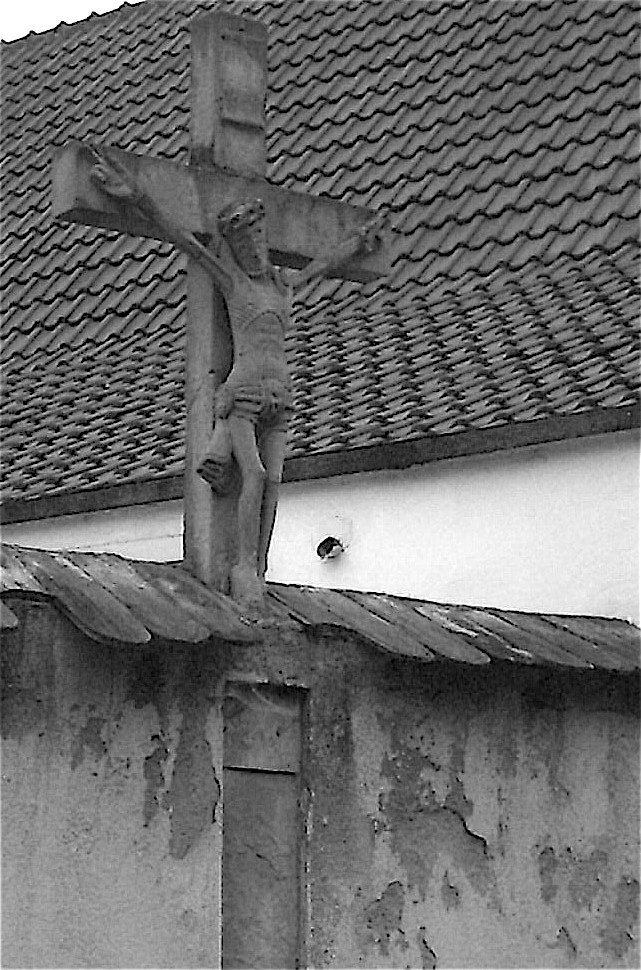
Calvaire (1746)

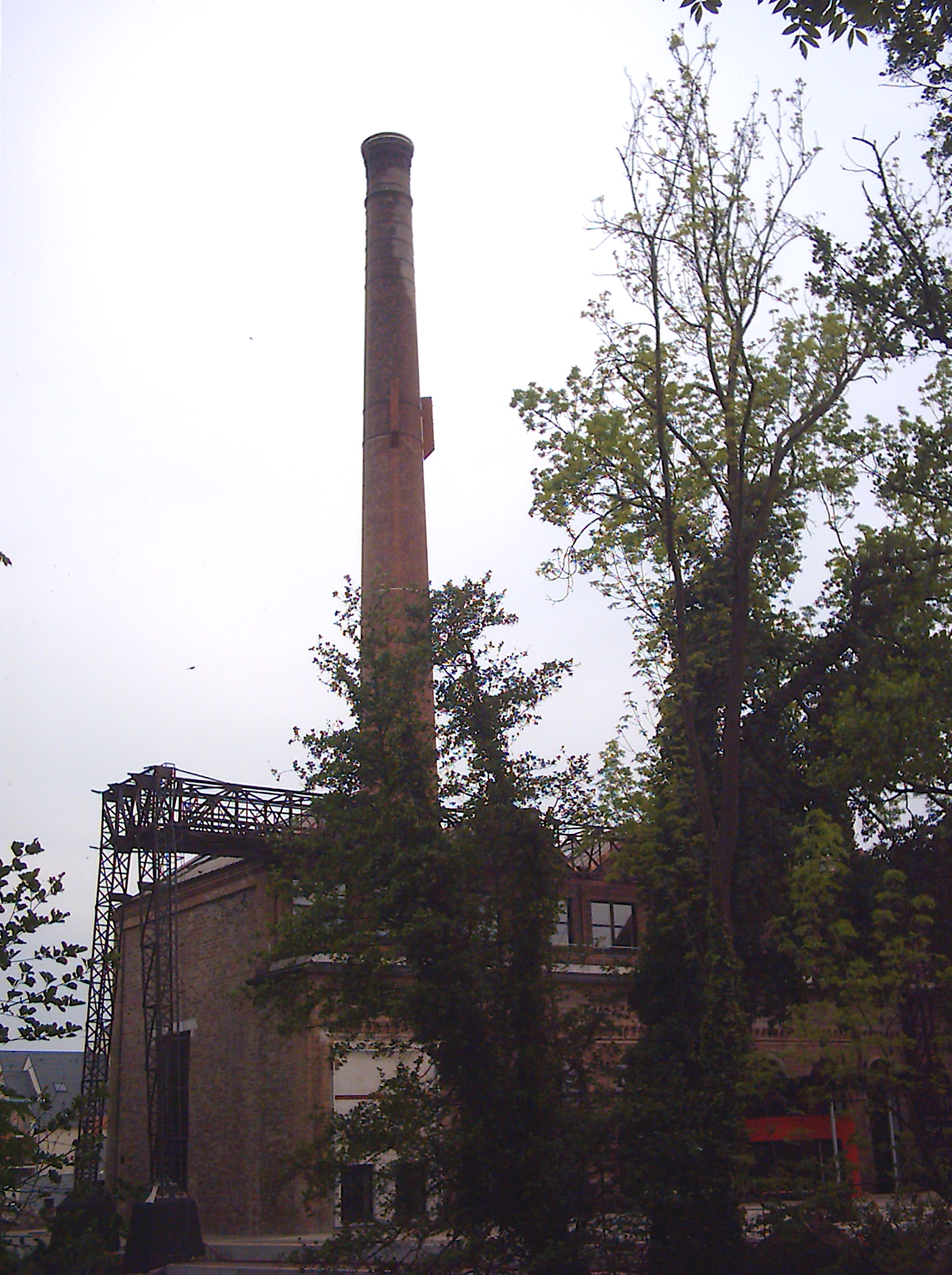
Old Factory

== People ==
- Laure Diebold, (1915–1965), Compagnon de la Libération, was born in Erstein
- François-Joseph d'Offenstein (1760–1837) French general, was born in Erstein

== See also ==
- Communes of the Bas-Rhin department
