= Senegalese people in France =

Total population
- 300,000

Regions with significant populations
- Paris, Marseille

Languages
- French, Wolof, Fula

Religion
- Majority Islam, minority Roman Catholicism

Related ethnic groups
- Black people in France, Afro-French, Mauritanians in France, Malians in France, Guineans in France, Bissau-Guineans in France

Senegalese people in France (French: Les sénégalais en France) consist of migrants from Senegal and their descendants living and working in France.

== History ==
=== Before World War II ===
Before World War II, Senegalese in France were a huge minority. The first Senegalese people in France were mostly Senegalese Tirailleurs who served France in World Wars and who settled in France after war. There were also navigators in ports and Senegalese students in French universities. There were also Senegalese domestic workers in France at that time.

=== After World War II ===
From the late 19th to the early 20th centuries, the Senegal River valley experienced a great deal of climate change. Because there were few industries in Senegal, people emigrated to France to find jobs. The first wave of Senegalese immigration to France took place, like other sub-Saharian waves, around 1964.

== Notable people ==
- Patrick Vieira, footballer
- Abdou Diallo, footballer
- Ibrahima Diallo, footballer
- Bafétimbi Gomis, footballer
- Tony Sylva, footballer
- Aïssa Maïga, actress
- Issa Diop, footballer
- Benjamin Mendy, footballer
- MHD, rapper
- Omar Sy, actor
- Rama Yade, politician
- Mamadou Sakho, footballer
- Ferland Mendy, footballer
- Youssouf Sabaly, footballer
- Kalidou Koulibaly, footballer
- Édouard Mendy, footballer
- Bernard Mendy, footballer
- Mati Diop, director
- Papa Bouba Diop, footballer
- Patrice Evra, footballer

== See also ==
- France-Senegal relations
- French people in Senegal
