= France–Senegal relations =

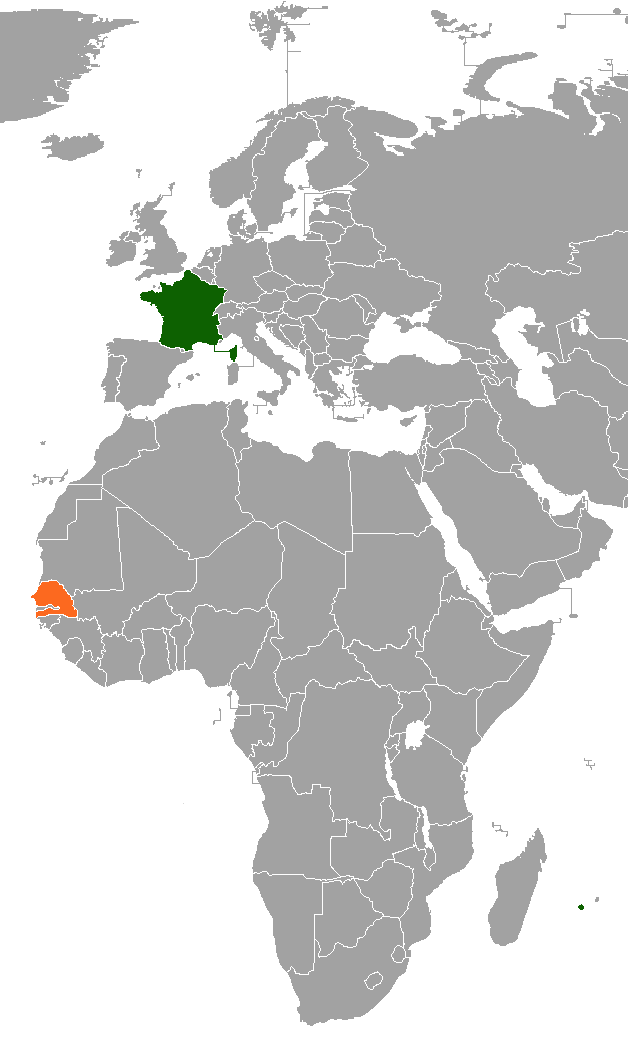
- France: Senegal

France and Senegal are both full members of the Organisation internationale de la Francophonie, and the United Nations.

== History ==
=== French colonization ===
Relations between France and Senegal stretch back as early as the 14th century, when French merchants travelled to and traded among the present-day Senegalese coast. France exported cloth, iron and muskets to Senegal and imported textiles, ivory, spices and slaves. In 1659, France established a trading post in present-day Saint-Louis operated by the French West India Company (later known as the Compagnie du Sénégal). As a result of the Seven Years' War (1754-1763) between France and the Kingdom of Great Britain, France lost its possession of Saint-Louis. Saint-Louis was returned to France in 1783 as a result of the French victory during the American Revolutionary War.

During the Napoleonic Wars, Great Britain captured French possessions in Senegal and in 1807 Britain proclaimed the abolition of the slave trade known as the "Slave Trade Act 1807". In 1816, Britain returned to France its possessions in Senegal. During the "Scramble for Africa" France began to insert control of the Senegal River and the hinterland of the country. By 1895, Senegal became part of the French West Africa colony with the capital in Saint-Louis before being relocated to Dakar in 1902.

During World War I and World War II, Senegalese soldiers known as Senegalese Tirailleurs fought in both wars for France and they fought during the Battle of France and in the Italian Campaign under the Free France government in exile led by General Charles de Gaulle. After the Liberation of Paris and the end of World War II, Senegal became part of the French Union in 1946.

=== Independence and present times ===
In April 1959, Senegal and Mali merged into the Mali Federation and declared independence from France in June 1960. Senegal became an independent nation in April 1960.

=== Post Independence ===
France and Senegal established diplomatic relations in August 1960. Both France and Senegal work closely together in West African regional affairs, and maintain a close cultural and political relationship. In 2010, France closed its military base in Senegal, however, France maintains an air force base within the Léopold Sédar Senghor International Airport in Dakar. In November 2024, the President of the Republic of Senegal Bassirou Diomaye Faye called for the departure of French soldiers from Senegal. The status of the end of the presence of French forces in Senegal is planned for September 2025. On February 12, 2025, Senegal and France decided to create a commission between the two countries, responsible for coordinating the closure of French military bases in Senegal and their restitution. On March 7, 2025, France returned several facilities used by the French army in Senegal, the first transferred as part of its military withdrawal from Senegal, where it had been present since 1960. On July 1, 2025, France handed over the Rufisque joint station to Senegal. This station, active since 1960, was responsible for communications on the southern Atlantic coast. It also served as a listening station in the fight against maritime trafficking. The handover was carried out without ceremony, limited to the signing of a report. The handover of the last remaining military infrastructure in Senegal to the Senegalese authorities is planned. On July 18, 2025, the two military sites will be returned to the Senegalese government: the airport base and Camp Geille, a 5-hectare site located in Ouakam. Four villas located in Plateau, near the port, will also be transferred to the Senegalese authorities. On July 14, 2025, Christine Fages, French Ambassador to Senegal, declared, "In accordance with the guidelines established in 2022 by President Macron, France will return to Senegal the military bases of the French elements in Senegal, on July 18, 2025.

== Trade ==
In 2016, trade between France and Senegal totaled €834 million Euros. Senegal is France's 57th largest trading partner globally and third largest from Africa. France is the largest foreign investor in Senegal with over €1.7 billion Euros worth of investments within the country. Several French multinational companies such as BNP Paribas, Eramet, Orange S.A., Necotrans and Société Générale operate in Senegal. All imports from Senegal to France are duty-free and quota-free, with the exception of armaments, as part of the Everything but Arms initiative of the European Union.

== Resident diplomatic missions ==
- France has an embassy in Dakar.
- Senegal has an embassy in Paris and consulates-general in Bordeaux, Lyon and in Marseille and a consular agency in Le Havre.
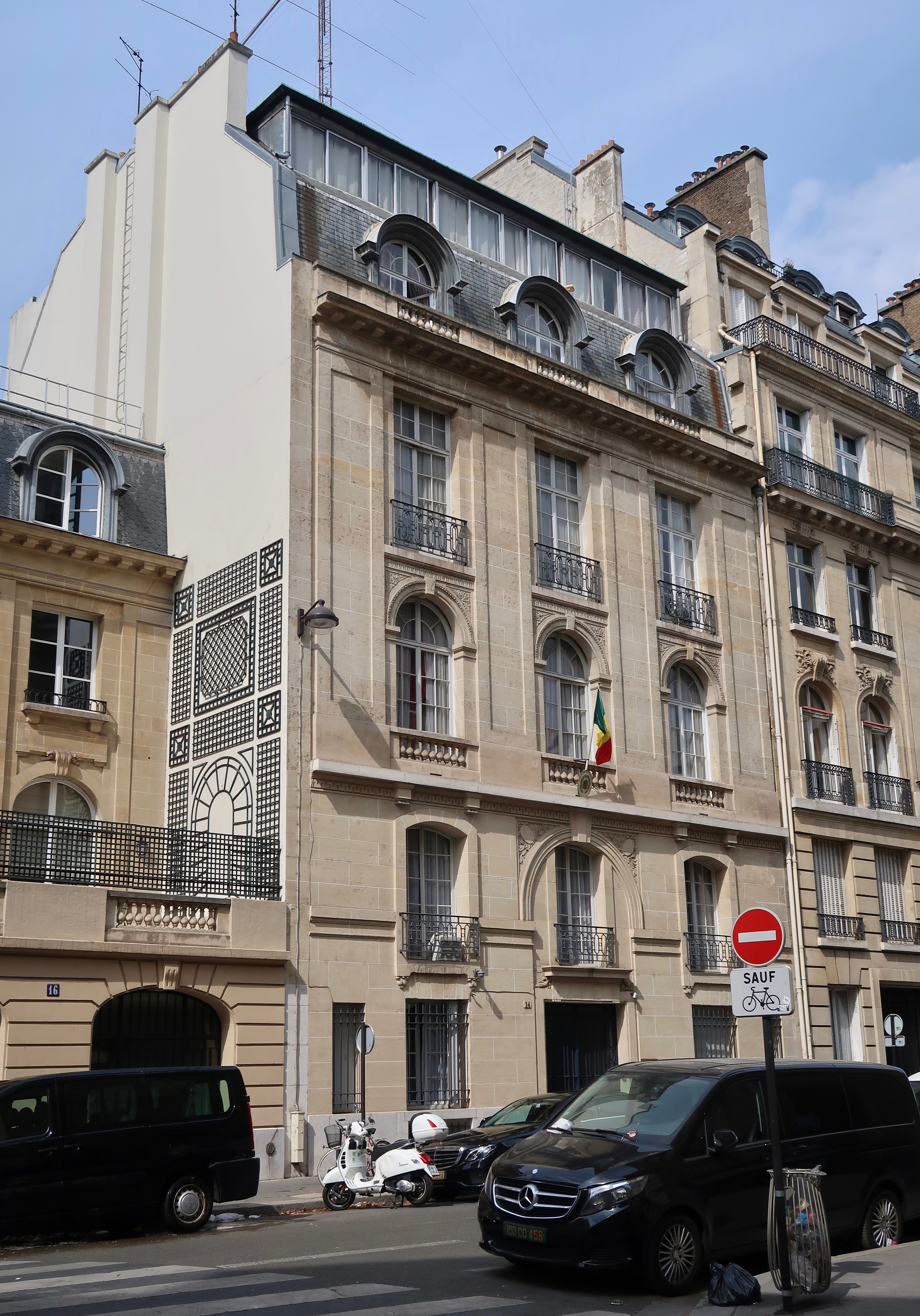
Embassy of Senegal in Paris

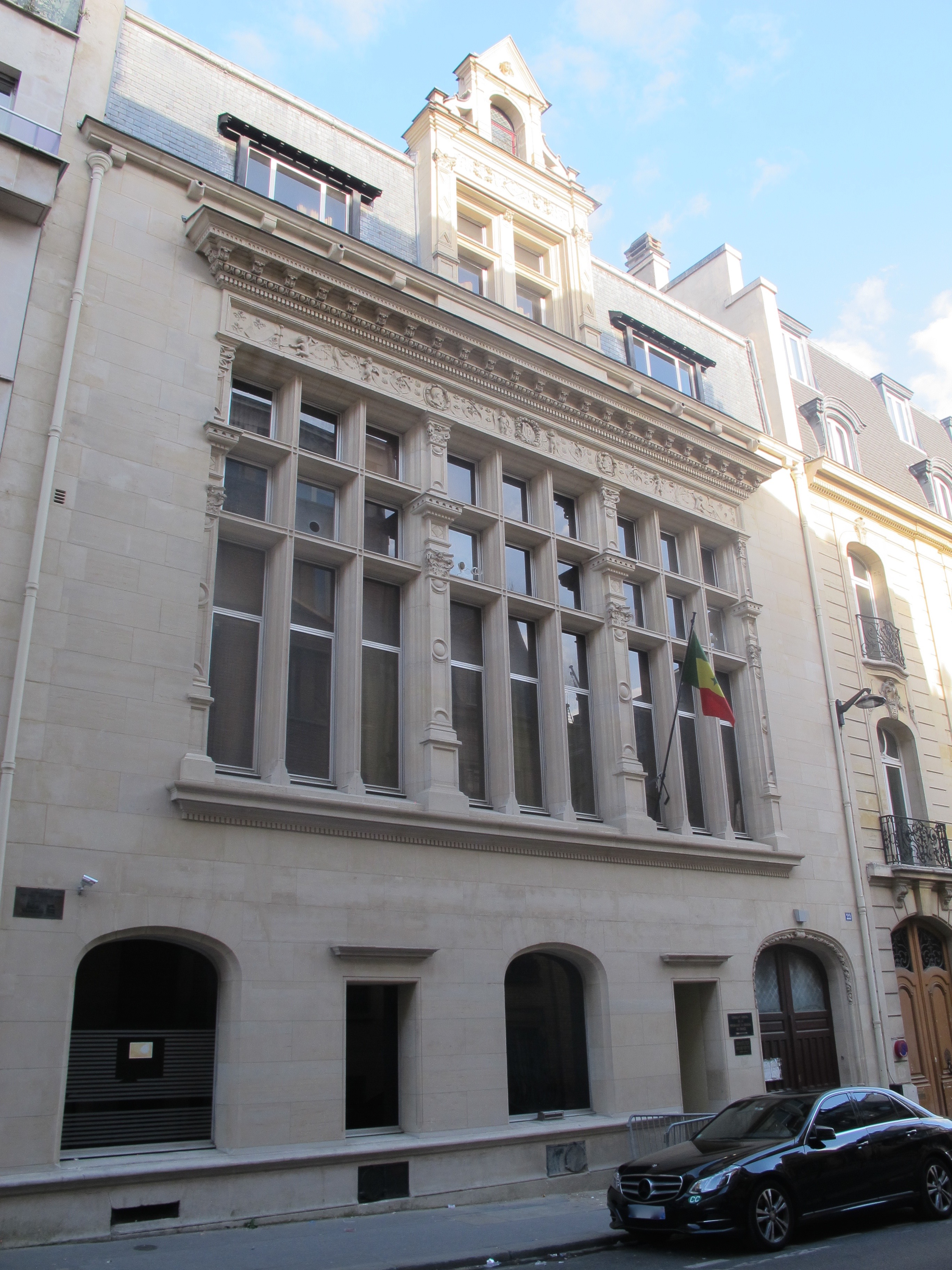
Consulate-General of Senegal in Paris

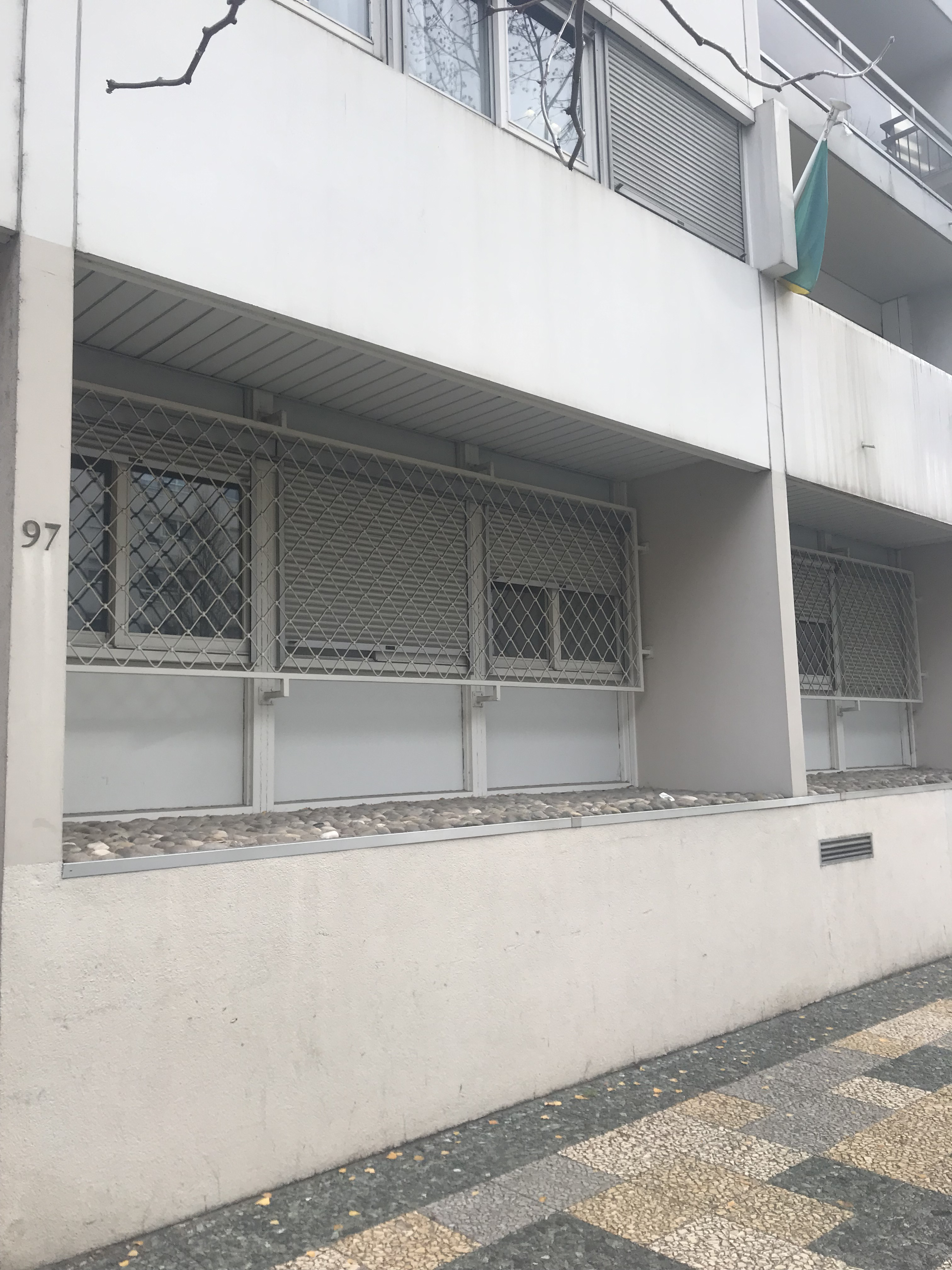
Consulate-General of Senegal in Lyon

== See also ==
- Louis Faidherbe
- Canada–Senegal relations
- Black Africa (Afrique Noire)
- Black Africans (Africains Noirs)
- Presidential Council for Africa
- Claiborne County
- The Gateway to Africa
- French people in Senegal
- Vietnamese people in Senegal
- Senegalese people in France
- Mohamed Mbougar Sarr
- Lycée Français Jacques Prévert
