= Guineans in France =

Migrant group in France

Total population
- 55,000

Regions with significant populations
- Paris, Marseille

Languages
- French, Mandinka, Fula

Religion
- Christianity, Sunni Islam

Related ethnic groups
- Black people in France, Afro-French, Senegalese people in France, Bissau-Guineans in France, Malians in France, Ivorians in France

Guineans in France consist of migrants from Guinea and their descendants living and working in France.

== History ==
During the 1960s, Black Africans began to immigrate to France in large numbers. These immigrants mostly came from the Senegal Valley (Senegal, Mali, Mauritania, Guinea) and were composed mainly of male workers. By the 1970s, the population of Guineans in France had more than doubled due to immigration laws permitting family reunifications. The growth of this population slowed significantly during the 1990s, but has increased in the 21st century, with immigrants now increasingly settling outside the Île-de-France in cities like Lyon or Marseille.

== Notable people ==
- Black M, rapper
- Paul Pogba, footballer
- MHD, rapper
- Diaryatou Bah, activist
- Tidjan Keita (born 1996), French-Guinean basketball player in the Israeli Basketball Premier League
- Richard Soumah, footballer
