= Mauritanians in France =

Ethnic group in France

Total population
- 15,000

Regions with significant populations
- Paris, Seine-Saint-Denis

Languages
- French, Arabic, Soninké

Religion
- Sunni Islam

Related ethnic groups
- Black people in France, Afro-French, Senegalese people in France, Malians in France, Algerians in France

Mauritanians in France consist of migrants from Mauritania and their descendants living and working in France. They are one of the diasporas from Sub-Saharan Africa in France.

== History ==
The wave of Mauritanians immigrants began in the 1960s. At that time, France requested immigrants from West Africa (Mauritania, Senegal, Mali, Guinea). A lot of male workers came to France, followed by their wives and children. A few thousands of Mauritanians came in France to work in the automotive industry. However, this wave of immigrants stopped in the 1980s, because of the hardening of immigration policy in France.

== Origins ==
Most of the Mauritanians are Soninké people from the Senegal River Valley, at the extreme south of Mauritania. There is also a significant number of Mauritanians who are born in France.

== Notable people ==
- Omar Sy, actor
- Mokobe, singer
- Karim Miske, filmmaker
- Mounir Chouiar, footballer
- Omaré Gassama, footballer
