= Huttenheim =

Huttenheim Hìttene
- Commune
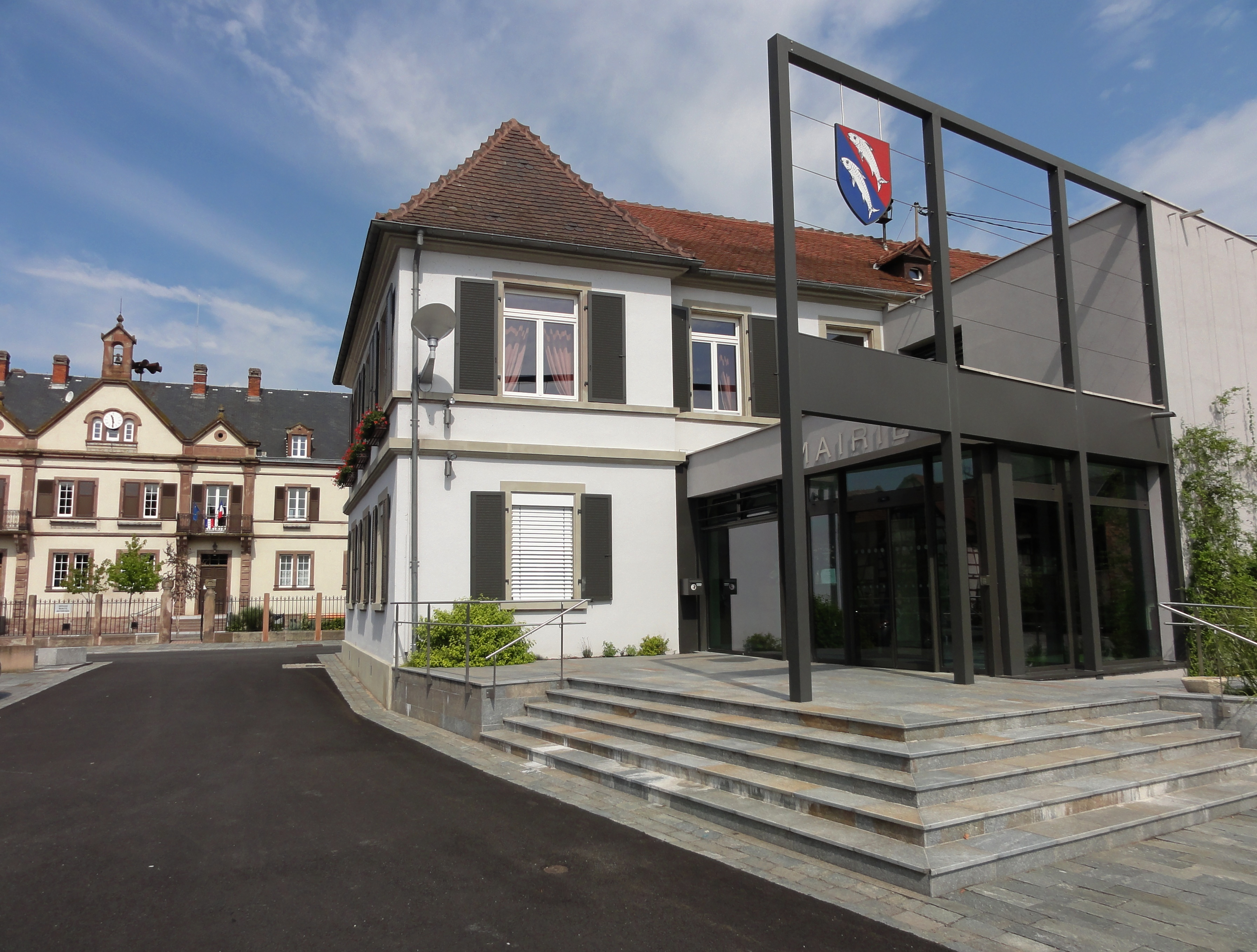
- The town hall in Huttenheim

- Coat of arms
- Location of Huttenheim
- Location within France Location within Grand Est
- Coordinates: 48°21′35″N 7°34′47″E
- Country: France
- Region: Grand Est
- Department: Bas-Rhin
- Arrondissement: Sélestat-Erstein
- Canton: Erstein

Government
  - Mayor (2020–2026): Jean-Jacques Breitel
- Area^{1}: 12.55 km^{2} (4.85 sq mi)
- Elevation: 160 m (520 ft)
- Highest elevation: 162 m (531 ft)
- Lowest elevation: 156 m (512 ft)
- Population (2023): 2,735
  - Density: 217.9/km^{2} (564.4/sq mi)
- Time zone: UTC+01:00 (CET)
  - Summer (DST): UTC+02:00 (CEST)
- INSEE/Postal code: 67216 /67230
- ^{1} French Land Register data, which excludes lakes, ponds, glaciers > 1 km^{2} (0.386 sq mi or 247 acres) and river estuaries.

Huttenheim (German: Hüttenheim) is a commune in the Bas-Rhin department in Grand Est in north-eastern France.

== History ==
The village can trace its recorded history back to the seventh century.

Positioned to the south-west of Benfeld, not far from the Roman era road known as the Road of the Heathens ("route des païens" / "S'Heidestressel"), the village was included in the property of the feudal lordship of Eticho, and was bequeathed in 667 to the Abbey of Ebersmunster. With the arrival of missionary friars from the north, dedicated, for the next three centuries, to the Christianisation of the region, the village walls were transformed and a new mentality seized the entire region. The villagers were early adopters of the Christian religion. Hardworking and combative, people mostly lived by fishing and by hunting: fish and game were abundant in the region. They lived in huts on the banks of the River Ill: the surrounding fields would have been criss-crossed by meandering streams.

Over the centuries, the name of the village changed as the local dialects evolved. Around 728 it was Hittenheim which had become Hudenheim by 770 and Hivatinquhaim in 798. In 884 it is written as Hindingheim, in 959 Hitingheim and in 1039 Hutenheim. The name Hittenheim was used in 1174 and Huttenheim ("Hìttene" in the local version of Alsatian) first appears in 1560.

== Geography ==
Huttenheim is located on the eastern side of central Alsace, some thirty kilometres (19 miles) south of Strasbourg and forty kilometres (25 miles) north-north-east of Colmar. Sélestat and Obernai are each some fifteen kilometres (9.3 miles) distant while to the east the Rhinau ferry crossing into Germany is some ten kilometres (6.2 miles) away.

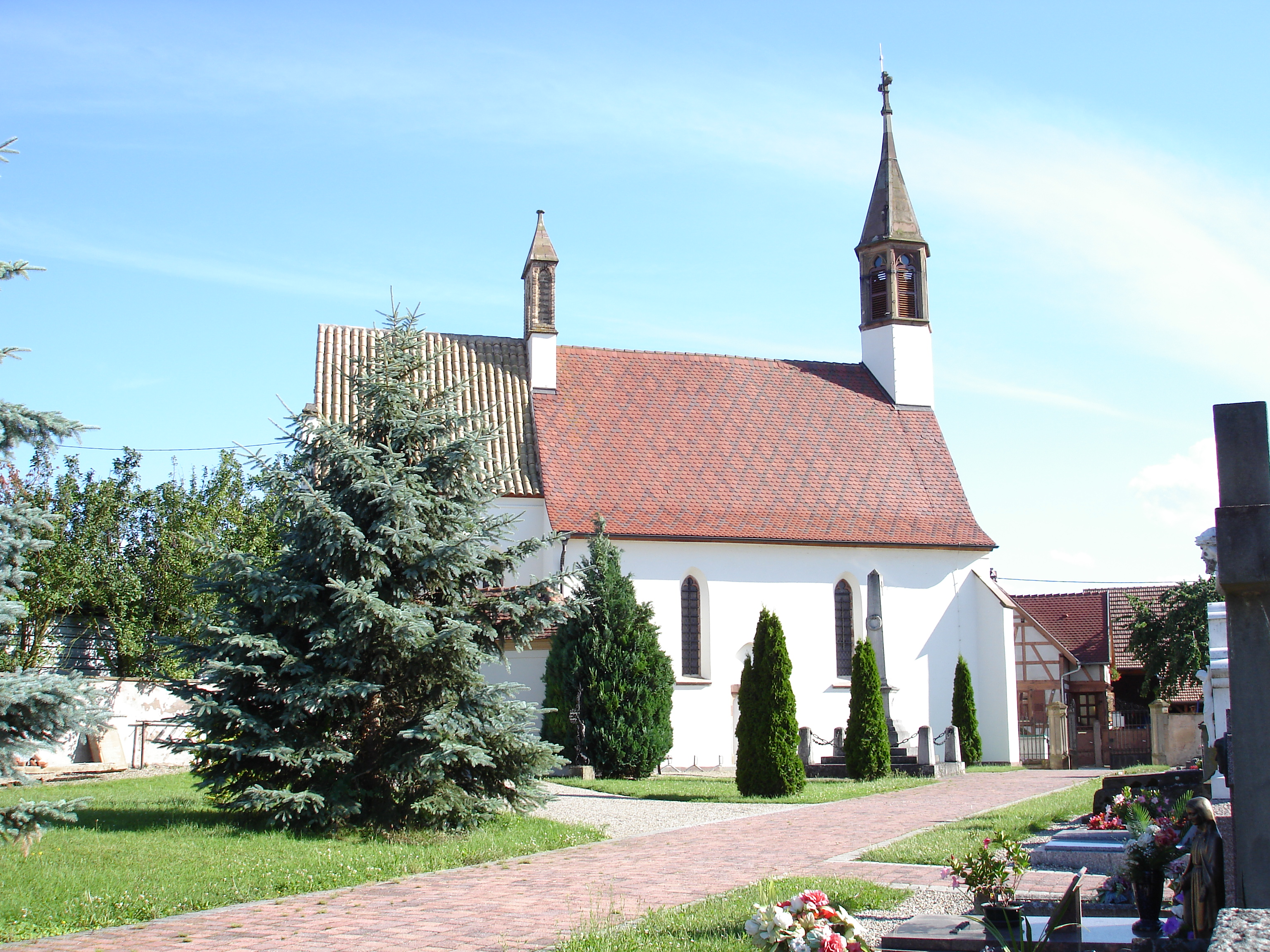
Church

The district is known as the reed country, on account of the reeds that grew in the surrounding marshland. In recent centuries the Rhine has been channelled which along with agriculturally driven drainage projects has made the land less marshy and more cultivable. The water table, though lower than in Roman times, remains unusually close to the surface, however.

Huttenheim is administratively linked with the neighbouring commune of Benfeld.

Although the Rhine is some distance to the east, Huttenheim is positioned right on the eastern bank of the River Ill a major river originating in the Jura region and which is thought to have given Alsace its name: the Ill here flows from south to north, approximately parallel with the Rhine, before the two rivers fully connect at Strasbourg. Because of the historically marshy nature of the landscape there are, following drainage of the region, numerous other water courses in the area.

== Demographics ==
Historical population

Year	Pop.	±% p.a.
1793	840	—
1831	1,319	+1.19%
1851	2,186	+2.56%
1880	2,359	+0.26%
1900	2,017	−0.78%
1936	1,752	−0.39%
1962	1,625	−0.29%
1968	1,893	+2.58%

Year	Pop.	±% p.a.
1975	2,062	+1.23%
1982	1,974	−0.62%
1990	1,999	+0.16%
1999	2,094	+0.52%
2007	2,461	+2.04%
2012	2,591	+1.03%
2017	2,701	+0.84%
2023	2,735	+0.21%

Source: EHESS and INSEE (1968-2023)

== People ==
- Paul Rohmer (1876–1977), famous French physician, was born at Huttenheim.
- Albert Rohmer (1913–2006), pediatrician and resistance hero was also born at Huttenheim.
- Louis Feltz, organist and musician.

== See also ==
- Communes of the Bas-Rhin department
