= Bissau-Guineans in France =

Guinea-Bissauan French
Total population
- 5.700 (estimated)

Regions with significant populations
- Paris, Seine-Saint-Denis

Languages
- French, Portuguese, Fula

Religion
- Sunni Islam, Roman Catholicism

Related ethnic groups
- Black people in France, Afro-French, Senegalese people in France, Guineans in France

Bissau-Guineans in France consist of migrants from Guinea-Bissau and their descendants living and working in France.

== History ==
The first Bissau-Guineans immigrants came in the early 20th century. There were Manjacks navigators who worked for French companies. They came via Senegal to ports like Marseille, and go to Paris. There was family reunification with wives of the navigators who came in France in the 1950s and 1960s. There was also another wave of Bissau-Guinean immigration, mostly composed of economic migrants.

== Origins ==
Most of the Bissau-Guineans in France are Manjack people, from the north-west of Bissau-Guinea.
