= Embassy of France, Bamako =

French diplomatic mission in Mali

Coordinates: 12.6362°N 7.9946°W

The Embassy of France in Bamako is the diplomatic mission of France to Mali. It is in Patrice Lumumba Square in Bamako, the capital of Mali. In 2022, Joël Meyer, the French ambassador to Mali, was expelled by Mali for diplomatic reasons.

== See also ==
- France–Mali relations
