= First Lady of Senegal =

Title accorded to the spouse of the president of Senegal

- Incumbent; Marie Khone Faye; Absa Faye since 2 April 2024
- Residence: Presidential Palace
- Inaugural holder: Colette Senghor
- Formation: 6 September 1960; 66 years ago
- Website: First Lady of Senegal

The first lady of Senegal (French: Première Dame du Sénégal) is the title attributed to the wife of the president of Senegal. The country's current first lady is wife of President Bassirou Diomaye Faye, who had held the position since 2 April 2024. There has been no first gentleman of Senegal to date.

== History ==
Senegal's inaugural first lady, Colette Senghor, wife of President Léopold Sédar Senghor, was from France. The country's second first lady, Elizabeth Diouf, is of mixed race. Like Colette Senghor, Viviane Wade, Senegal's third first lady, is an ethnic French woman from France.

Marieme Faye Sall, the country's fourth first lady, is the country's first black first lady, as well as the first fully Senegalese-born and raised first lady.

President Bassirou Diomaye Faye, who has two wives, Marie Khone Faye and Absa Faye, is Senegal's first polygamous president.

== First ladies of Senegal ==
Name	Portrait	Term began	Term ended	President	Notes
Colette Senghor		6 September 1960	31 December 1980	Léopold Sédar Senghor	
Elizabeth Diouf		1 January 1981	1 April 2000	Abdou Diouf	
Viviane Wade		1 April 2000	2 April 2012	Abdoulaye Wade	
Marieme Faye Sall		2 April 2012	2 April 2024	Macky Sall	
Marie Khone Faye		2 April 2024	Incumbent	Bassirou Diomaye Faye	
Absa Faye		2 April 2024	Incumbent	Bassirou Diomaye Faye	

== See also ==
- Senegal
  - President of Senegal
  - List of colonial governors of Senegal
  - Politics of Senegal
- Lists of office-holders
