= Marie Khone Faye =

First Lady of Senegal

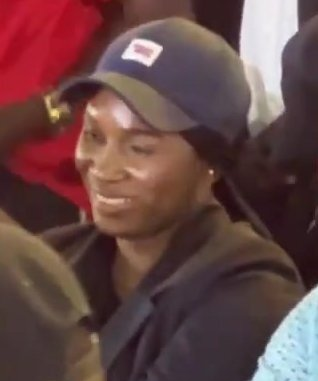
- Faye in 2024

First Lady of Senegal
- Incumbent
- Assumed role 2 April 2024 Serving with Absa Faye
- President: Bassirou Diomaye Faye
- Preceded by: Marieme Faye Sall

Personal details
- Spouse: Bassirou Diomaye Faye (m. 2009)
- Children: 4
- Education: Cheikh Anta Diop University; Higher Institute of Management

Marie Khone Faye is the first wife of President Bassirou Diomaye Faye, co-wife of Absa Faye, and First Lady of Senegal.

== Early life and education ==
Marie Khone Faye is the oldest child of a family of seven children. Her father, Mbaye Faye, is a retired teacher in Ndiaganiao and her mother, Coumba Faye, is a stay-at-home mother. She did elementary studies at the Marie Béatrice School of the Catholic Mission. She holds a baccalaureat from the Abdoulaye Sadji High School in Rufisque, a degree from Cheikh Anta Diop University in Dakar and a master's degree in Banking and Insurance from the Higher Institute of Management in Dakar.

Regarding her marriage, her father said:

"One day, Bassirou came here to tell me that he wanted to get married. My response was: Well, do you want me to go and ask for a girl's hand in your name? He tells me no. My wife doesn't leave this house. I ask him again. But who is this one? He said to me: Marie Khone, your daughter."

== Career ==
In 2015 and 2016, Marie Khone Faye worked at a microfinancing institution.

== First Lady of Senegal ==
She became First Lady, at the same time as her co-wife Absa Faye, at the investiture of their husband Bassirou Diomaye Faye.

== Personal life ==
Marie and her husband, Faye have four children, three boys and one girl.
