= Absa Faye =

First Lady of Senegal

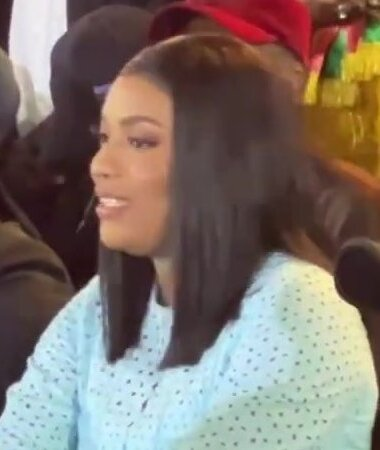
- Faye in 2024

First Lady of Senegal
- Incumbent
- Assumed role 2 April 2024 Serving with Marie Khone Faye
- President: Bassirou Diomaye Faye
- Preceded by: Marieme Faye Sall

Personal details
- Spouse: Bassirou Diomaye Faye (m. 2023)

Absa Faye is the second wife of Bassirou Diomaye Faye, co-wife of Marie Khone Faye and the First Lady of Senegal.
