= Colette Senghor =

First Lady of Senegal from 1960 to 1980

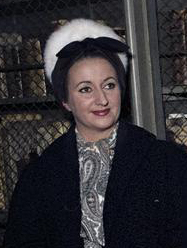

First Lady of Senegal
- In office 6 September 1960 – 31 December 1980
- President: Léopold Sédar Senghor
- Preceded by: Office Established
- Succeeded by: Elizabeth Diouf

Personal details
- Born: Colette Hubert; 20 November 1925 Mouzay, Meuse, France
- Died: 19 November 2019 (aged 93) Verson, France
- Spouse: Léopold Sédar Senghor (m. 1957; died 2001)

Colette Senghor née Hubert (20 November 1925 – 19 November 2019) was a French-born public figure who served as the first First Lady of Senegal from 1960 to 1980, as the wife of President Léopold Sédar Senghor following independence in 1960.

== Biography ==
Hubert was born in Mouzay, Meuse, France and came from a family of old Norman nobility. She was introduced to the Léopold Sédar Senghor, then deputy of Senegal and they married in 1957. In 1960, Senghor became the president of Senegal, and she took no public political position but preferred to be interested in his poetic writings. When Senghor left power, the couple went to France, where they stayed in Normandy. She died on November 19, 2019, in Verson, in the western region of Normandy, at their family home.
