= Party of the African Federation =

Party of the African Federation Parti de la Fédération Africaine
- President: Léopold Sédar Senghor
- General Secretary: Modibo Keïta
- Founded: 24 March 1959
- Dissolved: 1960
- Merger of: UPS; BS
- Ideology: Pan-Africanism

Party of the African Federation (French: Parti de la Fédération Africaine) was a political party in French West Africa, led by Léopold Sédar Senghor and Modibo Keita (general secretary). PFA was founded on 24 March 1959.

PFA held its constitutive conference July 1, 1959. PFA strived for the creation of a 'Black African nation freely associated with France'. PFA saw the Mali Federation as an initial step in this direction.

The Senegalese section of PFA was the Senegalese Progressive Union (UPS).

When the Mali Federation broke down, PFA was disbanded.
