= Mathieu Guidère =

Mathieu Guidere is a full professor at the University of Paris and research director at the French National Institute of Health (INSERM). A scholar of linguistics and translation studies, he has held other professorships at prestigious institutions including the University of Geneva, Switzerland (2007 to 2011). Guidere is also the founder of the Swiss MIM Multilingual International Mediators Non-governmental organization (NGO). He has been awarded a Fulbright Prize to advance his research on the psychology of terrorism. He has also been the editor-in-chief of the French Journal of Languages' Professors, Les Langues Modernes. In 2015, he was also Team Leader of the European Union CVE Program in the Sub-Saharan Region. In 2017, he was also the UNOWAS Senior Expert in West Africa and the Sahel Region.

Guidere has published over 40 books in the Arab countries and in the Islamic World in French, and many of his books are translated into Arabic and English, among other languages: Italian, Spanish, Portuguese, Japanese, etc.

During the 1990s, Guidère worked on issues surrounding global communications and propaganda from and to the Arabic language. Afterwards, he published several works including Advertising and Translation (Publicité et traduction, L'Harmattan, 2000), The Multilingual Communication: Market and Institutional Translation (La communication multilingue: Traduction commerciale et institutionnelle, De Boeck, 2008), and Iraq in Translation: The Art of Losing a War without Knowing the Language of your Opponent (Irak in translation : De l'art de perdre une guerre sans connaître la langue de son adversaire, Jacob-Duvernet, 2008).

== Education ==
Mathieu Guidere's interest in studying the Arab world began while he was a child as he spent his first 18 years in various countries throughout Africa and the Middle East. There, he received both a French, English and Arabic education. Upon arriving to Paris, he began his advanced studies at the Sorbonne University. There, he studied French literature and Middle Eastern cultures during his bachelor's and master's degrees. At the time, he joined the French Higher School of Interpreters and Translators (Ecole supérieure de cadres interprètes traducteurs) and graduated in 1995. Then, in 1997, he received the agrégation degree in Arabic language and culture before obtaining his doctoral degree in linguistics a year later, and while preparing a second doctorate from Paris-Sorbonne University.

== Career ==
After his agrégation degree (1997), Guidere became an associate professor (Maître de Conférences) at the University of Lyon in France, where he taught linguistics and translation from 1998 to 2003.

Guidere is the founder of the predictive linguistics in 2006 while he was professor at the French Military Academy of Saint-Cyr and director of the Strategic Information Analysis Unit. He applied his methodology to military psychology, and especially to PTSD early detection.

In 2007, Guidere joined the University of Geneva (Switzerland), where he was a full professor of Translation Studies and Multilingual Monitoring. He was also Director of the French Department, and Chair of the Research Group on Translation and Interpretation (GRETI, Geneva).

During his professorship there (2007-2011), he implemented predictive linguistics and he was the co-inventor of two international Patents on Cognitive Computing, that enabled him to establish leading academic programs directed to solve mental health disorders.

After that he joined the MIT Mind Machine Project as an external collaborator and published many articles on NLP (Natural Language Processing) applied to psychology.

By the end of 2012, the field had attracted the attention of many researchers and started to grow. He has been keynote speaker at the International First Responder Military Symposium, and the organizer of the First Euro-US Symposium on Psycholinguistics and PTSD.

In 2015, he published a book in French that summarizes his work on predictive linguistics (La Linguistique predictive: de la cognition à l’action), discussing the role of psycholinguistic markers in the prediction of violent actions and psychotrauma.

In 2022, Guidere published (in collaboration with French psychiatrist, Pr. Louis Jehel) a book on "Psychotraumatology: the Words of Trauma" (Paris : Editions Lavoisier) in which he applied predictive linguistic and AI large language models to common issues of mental health. His other publications in the field include : Psychocriminology Today (2023, in French) and The Language Within: Exploring Mental Health Through Predictive Linguistics (2024, published in English).

== Selected works ==
- Rethinking Language in Mental Health: Multilingual Approaches to Mental Health Montreal. ISBN 979-8335186100.
- The Language Within: Exploring Mental Health Through Predictive Linguistics Montreal. ISBN 979-8876838797.
- La psychocriminologie aujourd’hui, Montréal. 2023. ISBN 979-8877951563
- Psychotraumatologie : les mots du trauma / Psychotraumatology: the Trauma Words (In French. Lavoisier, 2022)
- La Traduction médicale à l'heure de la pandémie (Editions L'Harmattan, 2020)
- Voyage thérapeutique en Andalousie (Montreal. 2023). ASIN : B0CS3ZDYMM.
- La Linguistique prédictive: de la cognition à l'action (Editions L'Harmattan, 2015).
- La traductologie arabe : théorie, pratique, enseignement (Editions L'Harmattan, 2017).
- Médiascopie du vocabulaire arabe (Éditions Ellipses)
- Traduire la presse arabe (Éditions Ellipses)
- Traduire la littérature arabe (Éditions Ellipses)
- Grand Imagier, petits ateliers (Éditions Ellipses)
- Adab : l'essentiel de la culture arabe (Éditions Ellipses)
- Dictionnaire culturel et historique de l'arabe (Éditions Ellipses)
- Etat du monde arabe (Éditions De Boeck, 2015)
- La Guerre des Islamismes (Editions Gallimard, 2017)
- Le Retour du Califat (Editions Gallimard, 2016)
- Atlas du terrorisme islamiste (Éditions Autrement, 2017)
- Terreur: la nouvelle ère (Editions Autrement, 2015)
- Sexe et charia (Éditions du Rocher, 2014)
- Le Printemps islamiste: démocratie et charia (Éditions Ellipses, 2012)
- Atlas des pays arabes (Éditions Autrement, 2012)
- Le Choc des révolutions arabes (Éditions Autrement, 2011; nouvelle édition 2012)
- Les Nouveaux terroristes (Éditions Autrement, 2010)
- Obama inchallah (Éditions Le Manuscrit, 2009)
- Al-Qaida à la conquête du Maghreb (Éditions du Rocher, 2007)
- Le Manuel de recrutement d'Al-Qaida (Éditions du Seuil, 2006)
- Riche comme un oignon (Editions Ellipses, 2008)
- Introduction à la traductologie (Éditions De Boeck, 2008)
- La communication multilingue (Éditions De Boeck, 2008)
- Irak in Translation ou De l'art de perdre une guerre sans connaître la langue de son adversaire (Éditions Jacob-Duvernet, 2008)
- Les Martyrs d'Al-Qaida (Éditions du Temps, 2005)
- La traduction arabe (Editions Ellipses, 2005)
- La poésie arabe classique (Éditions Ellipses, 2005)
- Dictionnaire multilingue de la Défense (Éditions Ellipses, 2004)
- Méthodologie de la recherche (Éditions Ellipses, 2004)
- Kalimât: le vocabulaire arabe (Éditions Ellipses, 2003)
- Manuel de traduction français-arabe (Éditions Ellipses, 2002)
- Lexique bilingue de l'arabe d'aujourd'hui (Éditions du Temps, 2001)
- Publicité et traduction (Editions L'Harmattan, 2000)
