= Mouzay, Meuse =

Mouzay
- Commune
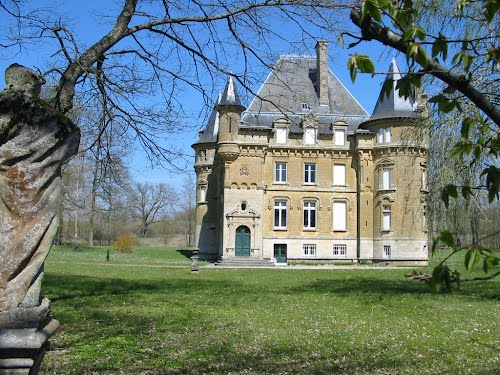
- The chateau in Mouzay

- Coat of arms
- Location of Mouzay
- Location within France Location within Grand Est
- Coordinates: 49°27′47″N 5°13′04″E
- Country: France
- Region: Grand Est
- Department: Meuse
- Arrondissement: Verdun
- Canton: Stenay
- Intercommunality: CC du Pays de Stenay et du Val Dunois

Government
  - Mayor (2020–2026): Pierre Belkessa
- Area^{1}: 35.73 km^{2} (13.80 sq mi)
- Elevation: 190 m (620 ft)
- Highest elevation: 277 m (909 ft)
- Lowest elevation: 164 m (538 ft)
- Population (2023): 651
  - Density: 18.2/km^{2} (47.2/sq mi)
- Demonym(s): Mouzayons (ou Mouzaillons), Mouzayonnes (ou Mouzaillonnes)
- Time zone: UTC+01:00 (CET)
  - Summer (DST): UTC+02:00 (CEST)
- INSEE/Postal code: 55364 /55700
- ^{1} French Land Register data, which excludes lakes, ponds, glaciers > 1 km^{2} (0.386 sq mi or 247 acres) and river estuaries.

Mouzay (French pronunciation: [muzɛ]) is a commune in the Meuse department in Grand Est in north-eastern France. It is situated on the right bank of the river Meuse.

== Climate ==
On average, Mouzay experiences 64.5 days per year with a minimum temperature below 0 °C (32.0 °F), 1.9 days per year with a minimum temperature below −10 °C (14.0 °F), 6.7 days per year with a maximum temperature below 0 °C (32.0 °F), and 12.3 days per year with a maximum temperature above 30 °C (86.0 °F). The record high temperature was 40.4 °C (104.7 °F) on July 25, 2019, while the record low temperature was −15.3 °C (4.5 °F) on December 20, 2009.

Climate data for Mouzay (1991–2020 normals, extremes 2007–present)
Month	Jan	Feb	Mar	Apr	May	Jun	Jul	Aug	Sep	Oct	Nov	Dec	Year
Record high °C (°F)	15.5 (59.9)	21.7 (71.1)	25.4 (77.7)	28.7 (83.7)	32.9 (91.2)	35.6 (96.1)	40.4 (104.7)	37.1 (98.8)	35.1 (95.2)	27.2 (81.0)	21.0 (69.8)	17.0 (62.6)	40.4 (104.7)
Mean daily maximum °C (°F)	5.6 (42.1)	7.1 (44.8)	11.6 (52.9)	16.5 (61.7)	19.7 (67.5)	23.2 (73.8)	25.3 (77.5)	24.7 (76.5)	20.9 (69.6)	15.5 (59.9)	9.8 (49.6)	6.5 (43.7)	15.5 (60.0)
Daily mean °C (°F)	3.0 (37.4)	3.7 (38.7)	6.6 (43.9)	10.2 (50.4)	13.5 (56.3)	17.0 (62.6)	18.9 (66.0)	18.4 (65.1)	14.7 (58.5)	11.0 (51.8)	6.8 (44.2)	3.9 (39.0)	10.6 (51.2)
Mean daily minimum °C (°F)	0.4 (32.7)	0.3 (32.5)	1.7 (35.1)	3.8 (38.8)	7.3 (45.1)	10.8 (51.4)	12.5 (54.5)	12.2 (54.0)	8.5 (47.3)	6.5 (43.7)	3.8 (38.8)	1.2 (34.2)	5.8 (42.3)
Record low °C (°F)	−13.9 (7.0)	−14.4 (6.1)	−11.3 (11.7)	−5.8 (21.6)	−2.7 (27.1)	1.0 (33.8)	2.5 (36.5)	2.8 (37.0)	−1.0 (30.2)	−6.0 (21.2)	−8.9 (16.0)	−15.3 (4.5)	−15.3 (4.5)
Average precipitation mm (inches)	76.1 (3.00)	60.4 (2.38)	52.1 (2.05)	46.4 (1.83)	68.3 (2.69)	77.5 (3.05)	51.7 (2.04)	68.3 (2.69)	53.7 (2.11)	66.8 (2.63)	70.4 (2.77)	97.8 (3.85)	789.5 (31.09)
Average precipitation days (≥ 1.0 mm)	13.1	11.9	9.3	8.6	10.8	9.9	8.7	9.0	7.4	9.6	12.2	14.8	125.3
Source: Meteociel

== Notable people ==
- Colette Senghor, French-born First Lady of Senegal (1960 - 1980)

== See also ==
- Communes of the Meuse department
