= Elizabeth Diouf =

First Lady of Senegal (1981–2000)

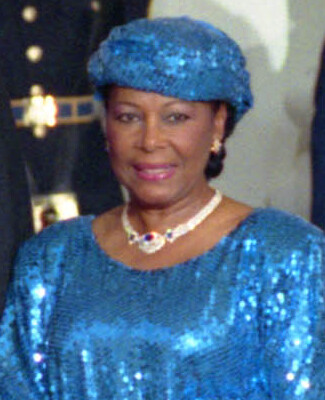
Elizabeth Diouf in the White House, 1991

Elizabeth Diouf is a Senegalese public figure, First Lady of Senegal between 1981 and 2000 as the wife of President of Senegal Abdou Diouf.

== Life ==
Of Senegalese and Lebanese Catholic ancestry, Elizabeth married Abdou Diouf in 1963 and the couple have four children.

During her husband's term in office, she also stood out for her interfaith dialogue between Christians and Muslims, and presidency and Church. Due to her husband's water access policies and Elizabeth's purchase of grain mills, the couple was called ‘Mr. Drilling and Mrs. Mill’ by Abdoulaye Wade, then opposition leader and Abdou successor. Despite maintaining a low profile and staying out of her husband's political life, Diouf collaborated on programmes to help the disadvantaged and founded the Solidaritat-Compartició foundation to assist these communities.

In July 1998 she visited Lebanon in a solo state visit invited by Lebanese president Elias Hraoui.
