= List of number-one hits of 2025 (France) =

This is a list of the French SNEP Top 200 Singles and Top 200 Albums number-ones of 2025.

== Number ones by week ==
=== Singles chart ===
Week	Issue date	Download + Streaming		
Week	Issue date	Artist(s)	Title	Ref.
1	3 January	Gazo	"Nanani Nanana"	
2	10 January	Gazo	"Nanani Nanana"	
3	17 January	Gazo	"Nanani Nanana"	
4	24 January	Bad Bunny	"DTMF"	
5	31 January	Gims	"Ciel"	
6	7 February	Gims	"Ciel"	
7	14 February	Gims	"Ciel"	
8	21 February	Gims	"Ciel"	
9	28 February	Gims	"Ciel"	
10	7 March	Gims	"Ciel"	
11	14 March	Gims	"Ninao"	
12	21 March	Gims	"Ninao"	
13	28 March	Gims	"Ninao"	
14	4 April	Gims	"Ninao"	
15	11 April	Gims	"Ninao"	
16	18 April	Werenoi, Damso and Ninho	"Triple V"	
17	25 April	Gims	"Ninao"	
18	2 May	Jul	"Phénoménal"	
19	9 May	Gims	"Ninao"	
20	16 May	Hamza	"Kyky2bondy"	
21	23 May	Hamza	"Kyky2bondy"	
22	30 May	Hamza	"Kyky2bondy"	
23	6 June	Hamza	"Kyky2bondy"	
24	13 June	Hamza	"Kyky2bondy"	
25	20 June	Hamza	"Kyky2bondy"	
26	27 June	Gims and Jul	"Air Force blanche"	
27	4 July	Gims and Jul	"Air Force blanche"	
28	11 July	Gims and Jul	"Air Force blanche"	
29	18 July	Bleu Soleil and Luiza	"Soleil Bleu"	
30	25 July	Bleu Soleil and Luiza	"Soleil Bleu"	
31	1 August	Bleu Soleil and Luiza	"Soleil Bleu"	
32	8 August	Bleu Soleil and Luiza	"Soleil Bleu"	
33	15 August	Bleu Soleil and Luiza	"Soleil Bleu"	
34	22 August	Gims and La Mano 1.9	"Parisienne"	
35	29 August	Gims and La Mano 1.9	"Parisienne"	
36	5 September	Gims and La Mano 1.9	"Parisienne"	
37	12 September	Gims and La Mano 1.9	"Parisienne"	
38	19 September	GP Explorer, Gims, La MANO 1.9 and SCH	"Un Monde à L'Autre"	
39	26 September	Gims and La Mano 1.9	"Parisienne"	
40	3 October	Gims and La Mano 1.9	"Parisienne"	
41	10 October	GP Explorer, Gims, La MANO 1.9 and SCH	"Un Monde à L'Autre"	
42	17 October	Disiz, Theodora	"Melodrama"	
43	24 October	Disiz, Theodora	"Melodrama"	
44	31 October	Disiz, Theodora	"Melodrama"	
45	7 November	Disiz, Theodora	"Melodrama"	
46	14 November	Disiz, Theodora	"Melodrama"	
47	21 November	Disiz, Theodora	"Melodrama"	
48	28 November	Disiz, Theodora	"Melodrama"	
49	5 December	Disiz, Theodora	"Melodrama"	
50	12 December	Disiz, Theodora	"Melodrama"	
51	19 December	Disiz, Theodora	"Melodrama"	
52	26 December	Disiz, Theodora	"Melodrama"	

=== Albums chart ===
Week	Issue date	Artist(s)	Album	Ref.
1	3 January	Gims	Le Nord se souvient	
2	10 January	Gims	Le Nord se souvient	
3	17 January	Rilès	Survival Mode	
4	24 January	Bad Bunny	Debí Tirar Más Fotos	
5	31 January	Bad Bunny	Debí Tirar Más Fotos	
6	7 February	The Weeknd	Hurry Up Tomorrow	
7	14 February	Lacrim	R.I.P.R.O	
8	21 February	Gims	Le Nord se souvient	
9	28 February	Gims	Le Nord se souvient	
10	7 March	Gims	Le Nord se souvient	
11	14 March	Les Enfoirés	2025 Au Pays Des Enfoirés	
12	21 March	Helena	Hélé	
13	28 March	M. Pokora	Adrénaline	
14	4 April	Vald	Pandémonium	
15	11 April	Gims	Le Nord se souvient	
16	18 April	Werenoi	Diamant noir	
17	25 April	Werenoi	Diamant noir	
18	2 May	Jul	D&p à Vie	
19	9 May	Jul	D&p à Vie	
20	16 May	Jul	D&p à Vie	
21	23 May	Werenoi	Diamant noir	
22	30 May	Jul	D&p à Vie	
23	6 June	Damso	Beyah	
24	13 June	Damso	Beyah	
25	20 June	Damso	Beyah	
26	27 June	Hamza	Mania	
27	4 July	Djadja & Dinaz	Terminal 7	
28	11 July	Gims	Le Nord se souvient: L'Odyssée	
29	18 July	Gims	Le Nord se souvient: L'Odyssée	
30	25 July	Gims	Le Nord se souvient: L'Odyssée	
31	1 August	Gims	Le Nord se souvient: L'Odyssée	
32	8 August	Gims	Le Nord se souvient: L'Odyssée	
33	15 August	Gims	Le Nord se souvient: L'Odyssée	
34	22 August	Gims	Le Nord se souvient: L'Odyssée	
35	29 August	Stray Kids	Karma	
36	5 September	Sabrina Carpenter	Man's Best Friend	
37	12 September	Gims	Le Nord se souvient: L'Odyssée	
38	19 September	Florent Pagny	Grandeur Nature	
39	26 September	Gims	Le Nord se souvient: L'Odyssée	
40	3 October	La Fouine	Capital du Crime Radio Volume 2	
41	10 October	Taylor Swift	The Life of a Showgirl	
42	17 October	Taylor Swift	The Life of a Showgirl	
43	24 October	Gims	Le Nord se souvient: L'Odyssée	
44	31 October	Gims	Le Nord se souvient: L'Odyssée	
45	7 November	Gims	Le Nord se souvient: L'Odyssée	
46	14 November	Orelsan	La fuite en avant	
47	21 November	Orelsan	La fuite en avant	
48	28 November	Aya Nakamura	Destinée	
49	5 December	Gims	Le Nord se souvient: L'Odyssée	
50	12 December	Jul	TP sur TP	
51	19 December	Jul	TP sur TP	
52	26 December	Gims	Le Nord se souvient: L'Odyssée	

== See also ==
- 2025 in music
- List of number-one singles in France
- List of top 10 singles in 2025 (France)
