= List of top 10 singles in 2025 (France) =

Top songs in France in 2025

This is a list of singles that have peaked in the top ten of the French Singles Chart in 2025. This record chart has been based on digital download only.

== Top 10 singles ==
Artist(s)	Single	Peak	Peak date	Weeks at #1	Ref.
Linh	"Je pense à vous"	4	5 January	-	
Helena	"Mauvais garçon"	10	12 January	-	
Teddy Swims	"Bad Dreams"	4	12 January	-	
Coucou les Congolais	"Squid Game 2"	3	12 January	-	
Damiano David	"Born with a Broken Heart"	3	2 February	-	
Marine	"Ma faute"	1	2 February	1	
Charlotte Cardin	"Feel Good"	4	23 February	-	
Doechii	"Anxiety"	1	23 March	6	
Gims	"Ninao"	5	30 March	-	
Jungeli and Lénie	"À tes côtés"	9	13 April	-	
Gims	"Ciel"	5	13 April	-	
Andrea Bocelli and Kendji Girac	"Je vis pour elle"	4	20 April	-	
Vianney	"Hallelujah"	2	27 April	-	
Lola Young	"Messy"	1	4 May	1	
Marguerite	"Les filles, les meufs"	7	11 May	-	
Florent Pagny	"T'aimer encore"	1	11 May	1	
Yuval Raphael	"New Day Will Rise"	2	25 May	-	
Louane	"Maman"	1	25 May	1	
Marine	"Coeur maladroit"	7	1 June	-	
Juliette Armanet	"Partir un jour"	5	1 June	-	
Rover	"Always on My Mind"	3	1 June	-	
Amel Bent	"Pourquoi tu restes"	1	1 June	1	
Trinix and Mariana Froes	"Vaitimbora"	10	15 June	-	
Vanessa Paradis	"Bouquet final"	1	15 June	1	
J-Hope featuring GloRilla	"Killin' It Girl"	9	22 June	-	
Lady Gaga	"Abracadabra"	2	22 June	-	
Alex Warren	"Ordinary"	1	22 June	1	
Damiano David	"Next Summer"	8	29 June	-	
Ed Sheeran	"Sapphire"	5	29 June	-	
Ed Sheeran	"Azizam"	1	29 June	1	
Jeck and Carla	"M'envoler"	8	6 July	-	
Gims and Jul	"Air Force Blanche"	5	6 July	-	
Bleu Soleil and Luiza	"Soleil bleu"	1	6 July	26	
David Guetta and Sia	"Beautiful People"	7	20 July	-	
Enrique Iglesias, Pitbull and IAmChino	"Tamo Bien"	10	3 August	-	
WizTheMc and Bees & Honey	"Show Me Love"	7	3 August	-	
Jul	"Toi et moi"	9	10 August	-	
Blackpink	"Jump"	5	10 August	-	
Triangle des Bermudes	"Charger"	2	10 August	-	
Gims	"Appelle ta copine"	9	17 August	-	
David Guetta, Hypaton and Bonnie Tyler	"Together"	6	24 August	-	
DJ Snake and Bipolar Sunshine	"Paradise"	3	24 August	-	
Huntrix	"Golden"	2	31 August	-	
Damiano David	"The First Time"	8	14 September	-	
Lady Gaga	"The Dead Dance"	2	14 September	-	
Feu! Chatterton	"Allons voir"	5	21 September	-	
Zaz	"Je pardonne"	4	28 September	-	
Gims and La Mano 1.9	"Parisienne"	3	28 September	-	
Bertrand Belin	"Berger"	10	5 October	-	
Disco Lines and Tinashe	"No Broke Boys"	10	12 October	-	
GP Explorer, Gims, La Mano 1.9 and SCH	"Un monde à l'autre"	9	12 October	-	
Paul Kalkbrenner and Stromae	"Que ce soit clair"	7	12 October	-	
Vitaa and Julien Doré	"Viens on essaie"	6	12 October	-	
Linh	"J'avoue"	9	19 October	-	
Rosalía, Björk and Yves Tumor	"Berghain"	3	2 November	-	
Katseye	"Gabriela"	4	9 November	-	
RnBoi	"Mon bébé"	8	30 November	-	
Gaëtan Roussel	"Je reste là"	7	30 November	-	
DJ Antoine, Paolo Ortelli and Jay C	"Sarà Perché Ti Amo"	6	14 December	-	
Together for Palestine	"Lullaby"	8	21 December	-	
Lou Deleuze	"Ce monde"	7	21 December	-	
Disiz and Theodora	"Melodrama"	1	21 December	8	
Jeanne	"Respire fort"	8	28 December	-	

== Entries by artist ==
The following table shows artists who achieved two or more top 10 entries in 2025. The figures include both main artists and featured artists and the peak position in brackets.

Entries	Artist	Singles
6	Gims	"Ninao" (5), "Ciel" (5), "Air Force Blanche" (5), "Appelle ta copine" (9), "Parisienne" (3), "Un monde à l'autre" (9)
3	Damiano David	"Born with a Broken Heart" (3), "Next Summer" (8), "The First Time" (8)
2
2	David Guetta	"Beautiful People" (7), "Together" (6)
2	Ed Sheeran	"Sapphire" (5), "Azizam" (1)
2	Jul	"Air Force Blanche" (5), "Toi et moi" (9)
2	Lady Gaga	"Abracadabra" (2), "The Dead Dance" (2)
2	La Mano 1.9	"Parisienne" (3), "Un monde à l'autre" (9)
2	Linh	"Je pense à vous" (4), "J'avoue" (9)
2	Marine	"Ma faute" (1), "Coeur maladroit" (7)

== See also ==
- 2025 in music
- List of number-one hits of 2025 (France)
