= List of number-one hits of 2026 (France) =

This is a list of the French SNEP Top 200 Singles and Top 200 Albums number-ones of 2026.

== Number ones by week ==
=== Singles chart ===
Week	Issue date	Download + Streaming		
Week	Issue date	Artist(s)	Title	Ref.
1	2 January	Disiz, Theodora	"Melodrama"	
2	9 January	Disiz, Theodora	"Melodrama"	
3	16 January	Disiz, Theodora	"Melodrama"	
4	23 January	Disiz, Theodora	"Melodrama"	
5	30 January	Disiz, Theodora	"Melodrama"	
6	6 February	Disiz, Theodora	"Melodrama"	
7	13 February	Disiz, Theodora	"Melodrama"	
8	20 February	Disiz, Theodora	"Melodrama"	
9	27 February	Disiz, Theodora	"Melodrama"	
10	6 March	Disiz, Theodora	"Melodrama"	
11	13 March	Disiz, Theodora	"Melodrama"	
12	20 March	PLK	"Pocahontas"	
13	27 March	Disiz, Theodora	"Melodrama"	
14	3 April	Disiz, Theodora	"Melodrama"	
15	10 April	Disiz, Theodora	"Melodrama"	
16	17 April	Disiz, Theodora	"Melodrama"	
17	24 April	Disiz, Theodora	"Melodrama"	
18	1 May	Disiz, Theodora	"Melodrama"	
19	8 May	PLK	"Pocahontas"	
20	15 May	PLK	"Pocahontas"	
21	22 May	Aya Nakamura and La Rvfleuze	"Sexy Nana"	
22	29 May	Aya Nakamura and La Rvfleuze	"Sexy Nana"	
23	5 June	Aya Nakamura and La Rvfleuze	"Sexy Nana"	
24	12 June	Aya Nakamura and La Rvfleuze	"Sexy Nana"	
25	19 June	Mauvais Djo	"Pilé"	
26	26 June	Mauvais Djo	"Pilé"	
27	3 July	Mauvais Djo	"Pilé"	
28	10 July	Shakira and Burna Boy	"Dai Dai"	
29	17 July	Shakira and Burna Boy	"Dai Dai"	
30	24 July	Shakira and Burna Boy	"Dai Dai"	
31	31 July	Shakira and Burna Boy	"Dai Dai"	
32	7 August	Shakira and Burna Boy	"Dai Dai"	
33	14 August	Shakira and Burna Boy	"Dai Dai"	
34	21 August	Shakira and Burna Boy	"Dai Dai"	
35	28 August	Shakira and Burna Boy	"Dai Dai"	
36	4 September	Shakira and Burna Boy	"Dai Dai"	
37	11 September	Mauvais Djo	"Maladie"	
38	18 September	Mauvais Djo	"Maladie"	
39	25 September	Vacra, La Rvfleuze	"Fille À Papa"	
40	2 October	Vacra, La Rvfleuze	"Fille À Papa"	
41	9 October	Vacra, La Rvfleuze	"Fille À Papa"	
42	16 October	Vacra, La Rvfleuze	"Fille À Papa"	
43	23 October	Vacra, La Rvfleuze	"Fille À Papa"	
44	30 October	Vacra, La Rvfleuze	"Fille À Papa"	
45	6 November	Vacra, La Rvfleuze	"Fille À Papa"	
46	13 November	Vacra, La Rvfleuze	"Fille À Papa"	

=== Albums chart ===
Week	Issue date	Artist(s)	Album	Ref.
1	2 January	Gims	Le Nord se souvient: L'Odyssée	
2	9 January	Gims	Le Nord se souvient: L'Odyssée	
3	16 January	Ninho	M.I.L.S IV	
4	23 January	Ninho	M.I.L.S IV	
5	30 January	Ninho	M.I.L.S IV	
6	6 February	La Fouine	Capiyale du Crime Radio, Vol. 3	
7	13 February	Bad Bunny	Debí Tirar Más Fotos	
8	20 February	Bad Bunny	Debí Tirar Más Fotos	
9	27 February	Bad Bunny	Debí Tirar Más Fotos	
10	6 March	Les Enfoirés	2026: La ballade des Enfoirés	
11	13 March	Harry Styles	Kiss All the Time. Disco, Occasionally	
12	20 March	PLK	Grand garçon	
13	27 March	BTS	Arirang	
14	3 April	La Rvfleuze	Numéro D'Écrou	
15	10 April	La Rvfleuze	Numéro D'Écrou	
16	17 April	La Rvfleuze	Numéro D'Écrou	
17	24 April	Fally Ipupa	XX	
18	1 May	Michael Jackson	Michael Jackson: Songs from the Motion Picture	
19	8 May	La Rvfleuze	Numéro D'Écrou	
20	15 May	La Rvfleuze	Numéro D'Écrou	
21	22 May	Jul	Oubliez-moi	
22	29 May	Jul	Oubliez-moi	
23	5 June	Jul	Oubliez-moi	
24	12 June	Alonzo	Drakkar	
25	19 June	Olivia Rodrigo	You Seem Pretty Sad for a Girl So in Love	
26	26 June	Lagui	En Croix	
27	3 July	Muse	The Wow! Signal	
28	10 July	Madonna	Confessions II	
29	17 July	Rolling Stones	Foreign Tongues	
30	24 July	Gracie Abrams	Daughter from Hell	
31	31 July	Bad Bunny	Debí Tirar Más Fotos	
32	7 August	Ariana Grande	Petal	
33	14 August	Stray Kids	This & That	
34	21 August	Stray Kids	This & That	
35	28 August	Enhypen	The Sin: Bliss	
36	4 September	Stray Kids	This & That	
37	11 September	PLK	Grand garçon	
38	18 September	Bouss	Et si J'Échoue	
39	25 September	Grand Corps Malade	Voir La Mer	
40	2 October	Tiakola	WpointM	
41	9 October	Tiakola	WpointM	
42	16 October	Tiakola	WpointM	
43	23 October	Angèle	Instinct	
44	30 October	Bernard Lavilliers	Rite Cruel	
45	6 November	Mylène Farmer	Égrégore	
46	13 November	Vianney	Les Evadés	

== See also ==
- 2026 in music
- List of number-one singles in France
- List of top 10 singles in 2026 (France)
