= Des mythos =

Single by Theodora
- Language: French
- Released: 6 February 2026
- Genre: Amapiano; jazz; pop; hip-hop
- Length: 2:57
- Label: Boss Lady Records; Virgin Music France
- Composers: Anoop D'Souza; Decs; Braxton Cook
- Lyricist: Theodora
- Producers: Anoop D'Souza; Decs

"Des mythos" (transl. Lies) is a single by French-Congolese singer and rapper Theodora, released on 6 February 2026 through Boss Lady Records and Virgin Music France. The song was produced by Anoop D'Souza and Decs and blends amapiano and jazz, with saxophone performed by American musician Braxton Cook. Lyrically, the song centers on an intimate relationship affected by dishonesty and disagreements about love, family, career, and motherhood. It peaked at No. 13 on the SNEP Top Singles chart, where it spent one week, and was certified gold.

== Background and release ==
The song was released on 6 February 2026 as a standalone single by Boss Lady Records and Virgin Music France. It was Theodora's first solo release following Méga BBL (2025) and a series of collaborations. Ado FM described "Des Mythos" as continuing the musical style associated with her breakthrough while noting its more introspective subject matter. The song was written by Theodora, with Desi-American producer Anoop D'Souza, Canadian producer Decs, and American saxophonist Braxton Cook credited as composers; D'Souza and Decs also handled production. Vogue France described their involvement as "a clear signal" of Theodora's growing international outlook, noting her ambitions beyond the Francophone music industry.

== Composition and lyrics ==
"Des Mythos" blends elements of amapiano and jazz with pop and hip-hop influences. The French magazine Tsugi described its arrangement as featuring piano and guitar over "amapiano rhythms" and "a jazz groove", with saxophone by Braxton Cook. Just Music characterized the track's rhythm as having "Latin and Afro influences" and noted its contemporary pop production.

Lyrically, "Des Mythos" sees Theodora address a troubled intimate relationship in which her partner professes his love and talks about starting a family, while she increasingly questions his honesty and intentions. The song also accentuates her financial independence and personal autonomy. In the second verse, Theodora turns to her career and the question of motherhood, rejecting her partner's expectations about their future and asserting her ability to make those choices for herself. NRJ interpreted this as an affirmation of her independence, particularly regarding her career and her choice of whether to become a mother. Ado FM described "Des Mythos" as "very introspective", interpreting the lyrics as Theodora reflecting on a relationship with a man who repeatedly lied to her, while Vogue France called it her "most personal song to date".

== Music video ==
The music video was directed by Melchior Leroux, professionally known as Melkiaur, and released alongside the song on 6 February 2026. Leroux had previously directed Theodora's videos for "Besoin d'aide" (2023) and "Fashion Designa" (2025), the latter of which also employed a surrealist visual style. "Des Mythos" presents Theodora in a series of highly stylized tableaux characterized by sculptural silhouettes, direct gazes at the camera, and elaborate staging. Zoé Schulthess Marquet of Vogue France described its visual style as a "polished, almost theatrical aesthetic" and interpreted the shifts in costume and atmosphere as reinforcing ideas of "masks, posturing and false appearances", which she connected to the song's themes of deception.

In a February 2026 interview with Vogue France, Leroux said that the video's concept was partly inspired by a dream his girlfriend had in which she was turning a crank, an image he developed into the recurring beads featured in the video. He cited filmmaker Lotte Reiniger as an influence, along with Monsters, Inc. (2001), particularly its sequence of doors leading to different worlds. Leroux also said that "Des Mythos" required more post-production work than "Fashion Designa" because of the number of elements incorporated into individual shots.

== Charts and certifications ==
"Des mythos" peaked at No. 13 on the SNEP Top Singles chart and was certified gold.

Weekly chart

Chart (2026)	Peak position
France (SNEP)	13

Certifications

Region	Certification	Sales/streams
France (SNEP)	Gold	50,000

== Credits and personnel ==
- Theodora – vocals, lyrics
- Anoop D'Souza – production, composition
- Decs – production, composition
- Braxton Cook – saxophone, composition
