= Braxton Cook =

American jazz saxophonist (born 1991)

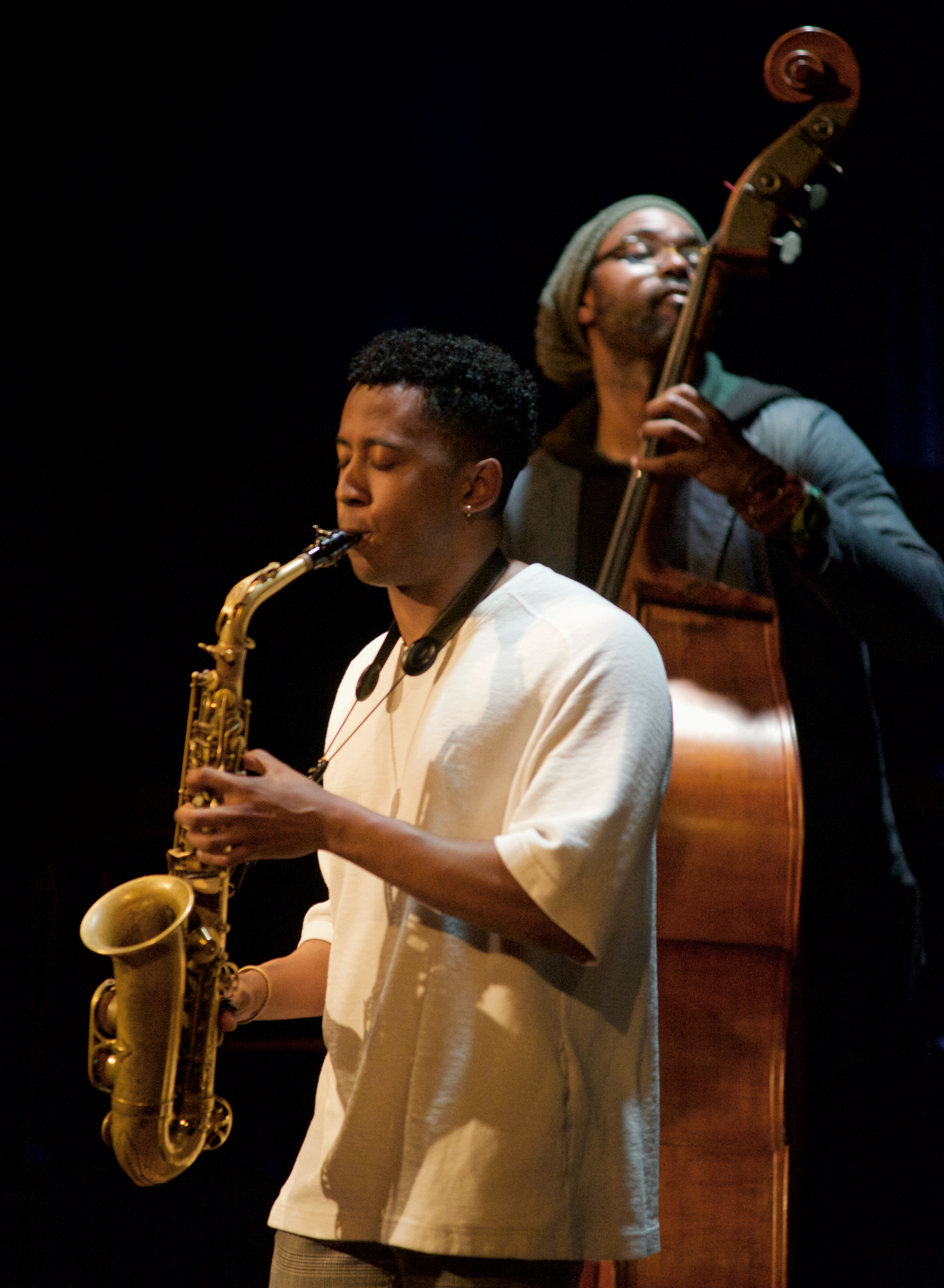
- Cook performing with the Marquis Hill Blacktet in Amsterdam, 2019

Background information
- Born: Braxton Cook; March 27, 1991 (age 35); Boston, Massachusetts, U.S.
- Genres: Jazz; R&B
- Occupations: Saxophonist; singer; songwriter
- Instruments: Alto saxophone; vocals
- Years active: 2014–present
- Labels: Fresh Selects; Nettwerk
- Website: www.braxtoncook.com

Braxton Cook (born March 27, 1991) is an American alto saxophonist and singer-songwriter. He has toured with jazz musicians Christian Scott, Christian McBride, and Marquis Hill, and performed with Jon Batiste, Mac Miller, and Rihanna. In 2017, Fader named Cook a "jazz prodigy," and in 2018, Ebony listed him as one of the "top five jazz artists to watch."

== Early life ==
Braxton Cook was born on March 27, 1991, in Boston, Massachusetts. After moving several times, his family settled in Silver Spring, Maryland, a suburb of Washington, D.C., where he lived for most of his upbringing.

Cook attended Springbrook High School and studied saxophone under the tutelage of Paul Carr. While there, he was one of 30 students in the United States to be selected for the 2009 Grammy jazz ensemble. He attended Georgetown University for two years, where he studied English with a concentration in African American Studies. As a freshman, he was named a 2010 YoungArts Finalist.

In 2011, Cook transferred to the Juilliard School, where he studied jazz saxophone with Ron Blake and Steve Wilson. In his first year at Juilliard, Cook attended a Donald Harrison concert, where he met Harrison's nephew, jazz trumpet player Christian Scott. Shortly afterward, Cook became a long-term member of Scott's touring band.

== Career ==
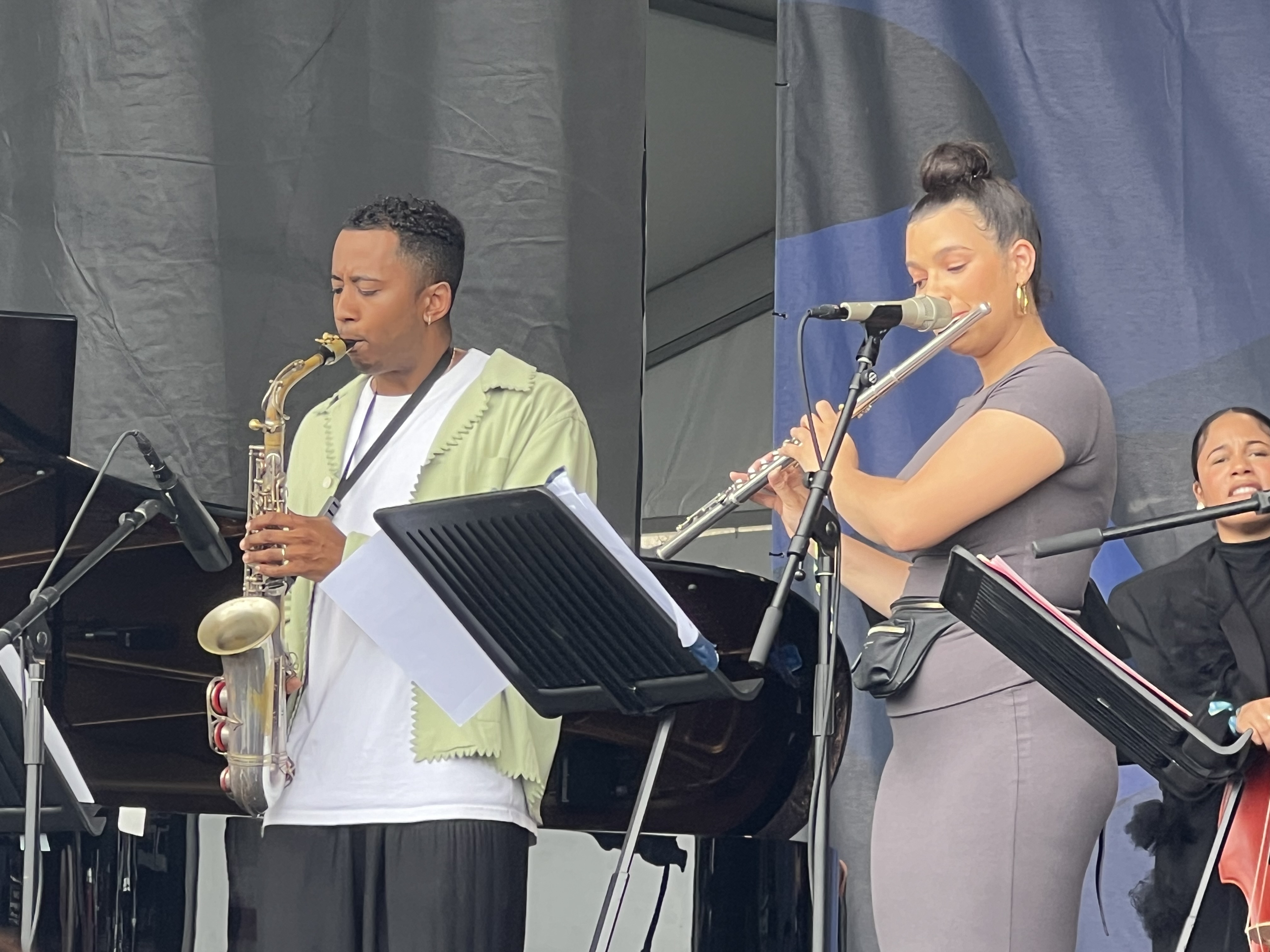
Cook and Elena Pinderhughes performing at Newport Jazz Festival, 2024

Cook launched his solo career in 2014, self-releasing his debut EP Sketch. He also self-released the full-length album Braxton Cook Meets Butcher Brown in collaboration with American jazz band Butcher Brown in 2015, before signing with independent label Fresh Selects in 2016. Cook has also been featured on several of Christian Scott's studio albums, including Stretch Music (2015), Diaspora (2017), and The Emancipation Procrastination (2017), the last of which was nominated for Best Contemporary Instrumental Album at the 61st Grammy Awards.

In 2018, Cook was featured in a Vox video titled "The most feared song in jazz, explained", which received the Outstanding New Approaches: Arts, Lifestyle and Culture award at the 40th News and Documentary Emmy Awards. For his contributions to the video, Cook received an Emmy Awards certificate.

In 2019, Cook performed alongside Jon Batiste on the soundtrack for Pixar's Soul, which won the Academy Award for Best Original Score.

In May 2020, Cook was featured in a virtual Tiny Desk concert for NPR, which he performed from his home in New Jersey. Without a band to support him due to social distancing, he used loops to support his guitar, vocals, and saxophone. During the concert, Cook performed tracks from various albums including Somewhere in Between (2017) and Fire Sign (2020), as well as his "Hymn (for Trayvon Martin)", which he wrote to explore racism and police brutality. He has also appeared as a sideman in Tiny Desk concerts featuring Christian Scott in 2015, Tom Misch in 2018, Phony Ppl in 2019, and Amaarae in 2023. In February 2025, after returning to NPR to lead an in-person Tiny Desk Concert alongside his backing band, Cook was described by NPR's Ashley Pointer as a "Tiny Desk all-star".

Cook's former Juilliard roommate Jahaan Sweet used a vocal sample from Cook in the production of "Lavender Haze", the opening track on Taylor Swift's 2022 studio album Midnights. Cook was credited as an additional producer on the track, which he did not hear until the album was released. Cook and Sweet had previously collaborated on the production of the song "Tryna Be" from Giveon's 2022 studio album Give or Take.

In December 2022, Cook announced the release of his fifth full-length studio album Who Are You When No One Is Watching on February 24, 2023, on Nettwerk. BET listed the album as one of the most anticipated releases of 2023. On August 29, 2025, he released his sixth studio album, Not Everyone Can Go.

In February 2026, he was credited as a saxophone player for Theodora’s "Des mythos" single. The single made it to the SNEP Top 20 Singles chart for its first week. The single achieved Gold certification in France just three months after its release.

== Discography ==
=== Studio albums ===
- Braxton Cook Meets Butcher Brown (self-released, 2015) (with Butcher Brown)
- Somewhere in Between (Fresh Selects, 2017)
- Somewhere in Between: Remixes & Outtakes (Fresh Selects, 2018)
- No Doubt (self-released, 2018)
- Fire Sign (self-released, 2020)
- Who Are You When No One Is Watching (Nettwerk, 2023)
- Not Everyone Can Go (Nettwerk, 2025)

=== Extended plays ===
- Sketch (self-released, 2014)
- Like You Used To (self-released, 2018)
- Black Mona Lisa (self-released, 2022)
