= List of top 10 singles in 2026 (France) =

This is a list of singles that have peaked in the top ten of the French Singles Chart in 2026. This record chart has been based on digital download only.

== Top 10 singles ==
Artist(s)	Single	Peak	Peak date	Weeks at #1	Ref.
Taylor Swift	"The Fate of Ophelia"	1	18 January	1	
Djo	"End of Beginning"	2	1 February	-	
Bruce Springsteen	"Streets of Minneapolis"	9	8 February	-	
Zélie	"Je ne serai jamais"	7	8 February	-	
Charlotte Cardin	"Tant pis pour elle"	1	15 February	4	
Angèle and Justice	"What You Want"	1	8 March	2	
Monroe	"Regarde!"	8	15 March	-	
Naïka	"One Track Mind"	3	15 March	-	
Jeck and Carla	"La recette"	9	22 March	-	
Bruno Mars	"I Just Might"	1	22 March	1	
Santa	"Dis-moi oui"	9	29 March	-	
Muse	"Be with You"	8	29 March	-	
Christophe Maé	"La Lune"	3	29 March	-	
Raye	"Where Is My Husband!"	2	29 March	-	
BTS	"Swim"	1	29 March	1	
Angélique Kidjo and Florent Pagny	"Malaïka"	8	19 April	-	
Olivia Rodrigo	"Drop Dead"	5	26 April	-	
Madonna	"I Feel So Free"	2	26 April	-	
Céline Dion	"Dansons"	1	26 April	1	
Zaho and MC Solaar	"Comme Caroline"	2	3 May	-	
Bon Entendeur and Dalida	"Mourir sur scène"	1	3 May	1	
Madonna and Sabrina Carpenter	"Bring Your Love"	1	10 May	1	
Shakira	"Zoo"	1	17 May	1	
Tame Impala and Jennie	"Dracula"	5	24 May	-	
Noam Bettan	"Michelle"	3	24 May	-	
Zazie	"Peu importe"	2	31 May	-	
Shakira and Burna Boy	"Dai Dai"	1	31 May	11	
Ariana Grande	"Hate That I Made You Love Me"	2	7 June	-	
Mylène Farmer	"C'est à qui le tour"	1	7 June	1	
Taylor Swift	"I Knew It, I Knew You"	7	14 June	-	
Ambre	"J'me demande"	4	14 June	-	
Hugel and Solto	"Jamaican (Bam Bam)"	2	14 June	-	
Manon Lisa	"Le petit pêcheur"	1	14 June	1	
BTS	"Come Over"	5	21 June	-	
Jennifer Lopez and David Guetta	"Save Me Tonight"	3	21 June	-	
Mauvais Djo	"Pilé"	4	28 June	-	
Gims	"Soleil"	9	5 July	-	
Madonna	"Love Sensation"	2	5 July	-	
Anotr and 54 Ultra	"Talk to You"	8	12 July	-	
Beyoncé	"Morning Dew (Donk)"	7	12 July	-	
Madonna	"Danceteria"	5	12 July	-	
Céline Dion	"Bonjour, pardon, merci"	3	12 July	-	
Sound of Legend	"San Francisco"	4	19 July	-	
Mauvais Djo	"Maladie"	8	26 July	-	
Oria	"Soirée mondaine"	6	26 July	-	
Ofenbach and Starsailor	"Four to the Floor"	3	26 July	-	
BTS	"Normal"	2	2 August	-	
Mauvais Djo	"Wagyu"	6	30 August	-	
Hugel, Imael Angel and Ultra Naté	"Movin' to the Sun"	1	30 August	11	
Teddy Swims	"Mr. Know It All"	6	6 September	-	
Angèle	"Une seule vie"	4	6 September	-	
Miley Cyrus	"Bass Persuades'	8	13 September	-	
Eddy de Pretto	"Sous influence"	6	13 September	-	
Falling in Reverse, Corey Taylor and Serj Tankian	"Joseph"	7	20 September	-	
Mylène Farmer	"Des lols et des quoi"	2	20 September	-	
TeddyBear	"Enfin bon"	6	27 September	-	
TeddyBear	"Chaussures roses"	3	27 September	-	
TeddyBear	"Le plus beau"	1	27 September	1	
U2	"Street of Dreams"	9	4 October	-	
U2	"Silencio"	8	4 October	-	
Taylor Swift	"Patient Zero"	2	4 October	-	
Gener8ion and Yung Lean	"Storm II"	5	11 October	-	
DJ Goja	"Mi Chico"	4	11 October	-	
Temper City	"Self Aware"	7	18 October	-	
La Fouine and Sinik	"Poudrière"	8	25 October	-	
Adèle Castillon	"Été avec toi"	2	25 October	-	
Jamie Miller	"Babydoll"	4	1 November	-	
Mosimann and Gaëtan Roussel	"Soon"	3	1 November	-	
Estl	"Te rencontrer encore"	2	1 November	-	
Doz	"Tu n'es plus là"	6	8 November	-	
Vianney	"J'ai menti"	5	8 November	-	
Vianney	"D'or et d'étain"	2	8 November	-	
U2	"The Greatest Show on Earth"	7	15 November	-	
Ella Langley	"Choosin' Texas"	7	22 November	-	
Justice, Tame Impala, SZA and King Gizzard & the Lizard Wizard	"Flower in a Hurricane"	1	22 November	1	

== Entries by artist ==
The following table shows artists who achieved two or more top 10 entries in 2026. The figures include both main artists and featured artists and the peak position in brackets.

Entries	Artist	Singles
4	Madonna	"I Feel So Free" (2), "Bring Your Love" (1), "Love Sensation" (2), "Danceteria" (5)
3	BTS	"Swim" (1), "Come Over" (5), "Normal" (2)
3	Mauvais Djo	"Pilé" (4), "Maladie" (8), "Wagyu" (6)
3	Taylor Swift	"The Fate of Ophelia" (1), "I Knew It, I Knew You" (7), "Patient Zero" (2)
3	TeddyBear	"Enfin bon" (6), "Chaussures roses" (3), "Le plus beau" (1)
3	U2	"Street of Dreams" (9), "Silencio" (8), "The Greatest Show on Earth" (7)
2	Angèle	"What You Want" (1), "Une seule vie" (4)
2	Céline Dion	"Dansons" (1), "Bonjour, pardon, merci" (3)
2	Hugel	"Jamaican (Bam Bam)" (2), "Movin' to the Sun" (1)
2	Justice	"What You Want" (1), "Flower in a Hurricane" (1)
2	Mylène Farmer	"C'est à qui le tour" (1), "Des lols et des quoi" (2)
2	Shakira	"Zoo" (1), "Dai Dai" (1)
2	Tame Impala	"Dracula (5), "Flower in a Hurricane" (1)
2	Vianney	"J'ai menti" (5), "D'or et d'étain" (2)

== See also ==
- 2026 in music
- List of number-one hits of 2026 (France)
