= Fade Up =

Single by Zeg P featuring Hamza and SCH
- Language: French
- Released: 24 June 2022
- Genre: Hip house; dance-pop
- Length: 3:39
- Label: AllPoints
- Songwriters: Zeg P; Hamza; SCH
- Producer: Zeg P

Zeg P singles chronology
"Fade Up" (2022)	"Cités de France" (2023)

Hamza singles chronology
"Laisse moi te dire" (2022)	"Fade Up" (2022)	"Zoum!" (2022)

SCH singles chronology
"Dreamlife" (2022)	"Fade Up" (2022)	"Ma Baby" (2022)

Fade Up is the debut single by French producer Zeg P. It features Belgian rapper Hamza and French rapper SCH. It peaked at number one on the French Singles Chart where it stayed for three non-consecutive weeks.

== Charts ==
Chart performance for "Fade Up"
Chart (2022)	Peak position
Belgium (Ultratop 50 Wallonia)	2
France (SNEP)	1
France Club 40 (SNEP)	2
Luxembourg (Billboard)	13
Switzerland (Schweizer Hitparade)	14

== Certifications ==
Certifications for "Fade Up"
Region	Certification	Certified units/sales
France (SNEP)	Diamond	333,333^{‡}
^{‡} Sales+streaming figures based on certification alone.
