= Méga BBL =

Compilation album by Theodora
- Released: 2025
- Recorded: 2024
- Genres: Hip-hop; pop
- Length: 33:34 (standard edition); 64:51 (reissue)
- Labels: Boss Lady; Maison Neptune; NBFD; NFBD

Theodora chronology
Tome 2 (2023)	Méga BBL (2025)

Méga BBL (BBL being the acronym for Bad Boy Lovestory) is a 2025 reissue of the first mixtape, titled Bad Boy Lovestory, by the French-Congolese singer Theodora.

== Background ==
On 1 November 2024, Theodora released Bad Boy Lovestory, her first mixtape consisting of 13 tracks. A reissue of the mixtape was released on 30 May 2025 under the name Mega BBL.

== Commercial performance ==
The mixtape debuted with 563 equivalent sales in its first week and entered the Top Albums chart at number 119. By December 2025, after more than 70 weeks, it had achieved over 200,000 equivalent sales. In 2025, the album reached number one on the French female albums chart and number four on the overall albums chart.

== Critical reception ==
Radio France's review highlighted that Theodora's mixtape stands out for its blend of diverse musical genres, ranging from hyperpop to rap, Afrobeat, and rock. According to reviews, this diversity creates a new, coherent, and sophisticated form of pop, enriched by numerous collaborations. The project is also noted for its narrative dimension and its social commentary, addressing themes of resilience and questioning the codes imposed on women, all while maintaining a touch of irony.

A review in the newspaper Le Devoir presented Theodora's mixtape as a work that redefines French-language pop. They highlighted the artist's freedom of expression, the diversity of musical styles, and the collaboration with several guests. It is mentioned that Theodora's music encourages self-confidence, particularly among women.

=== Year-end lists ===
Publication	List	Rank	Ref.
The Fader	The Fader's 50 Best Albums of 2025	15	
Les Inrocks	Les Inrocks' Best Albums of 2025	8	
Télérama	Best albums of 2025 (Top 50)	–	
Le Monde	30 favorite music albums according to readers of Le Monde	–	

== Track listing ==
Bad Boy Lovestory (standard edition)
No.	Title	Producer(s)	Duration
1.	"FNG"	MEI, Mattu	2:09
2.	"Fashion Designa"	John Makabi	3:04
3.	"243 km/h" (featuring Zoomy)	Jeez Suave	3:17
4.	"Kongolese sous BBL"	Jeez Suave	2:44
5.	"Bad Boy Lovestory"	Jeez Suave, Mattu	2:59
6.	"Sorry Sorry So"	Daddy Jo	2:25
7.	"Entracte: Histoire d'amour, commérages et Chardonnay"	Jeez Suave, Guyzzi	2:33
8.	"Ils me rient tous au nez"	Lasso	2:27
9.	"#Il"	John Makabi	2:01
10.	"Big Boss Lady" (featuring Jahlys)	John Makabi	2:09
11.	"Un meilleur nous"	Neon Valley	2:59
12.	"Mon casque"	San Juliet, Med	2:49
13.	"Doutes en boucle"	Neophron, Rosaliedu38, Esone	1:58
Total length			33:34

=== Reissue ===
No.	Title	Composers	Length
1.	"Pay!" (featuring Guy2Bezbar)	Junior Alaprod, Jeez Suave, Zafy
2.	"Do U Wanna ?"	Alex Naim
3.	"Papa <3"	TSB
4.	"Zou Bisou" (featuring Jul)	Boumidjal, HoloMobb
5.	"Massoko Na Mabele" (featuring ThisizLondon)	ThisizLondon, AoD, Jay Keys
6.	"I Wanna"	Decz, Sholz, Mike Wavvs, Steezefield
7.	"Mon bébé" (featuring Brazy)	Jeez Suave
8.	"Go!" (featuring Luidji)	Jeez Suave
9.	"Bad Boy Lacked"	Alex Naim
10.	"Les oiseaux rares" (featuring Juliette Armanet)	Genius on the Track, NAOMi
11.	"Boss Babies" (featuring BB Trickz)	Jeez Suave, amne, Daddy Jo, TN Kane
12.	"Ils me rient tous au nez" (live version; featuring Chilly Gonzales)	Chilly Gonzales

== Charts ==
Chart (2024–2026)	Peak position
Belgian Albums (Ultratop Wallonia)	15
French Albums (SNEP)	2
Swiss Albums (Schweizer Hitparade)	21

== Certifications and sales ==
Region	Certification	Certified units/sales
France (SNEP)	3× Platinum	395,700
