= Mauvais Djo =

Congolese-French rapper

- Born: Joël Raul Marcolino; 20 October 1997 (age 29); Rouen, France
- Genre: French hip-hop
- Occupations: MC; songwriter
- Years active: 2020–present
- Labels: YPDP; Nojoke Records
- Member of: Triangle des Bermudes

Joël Raul Marcolino (born 20 October 1997), known professionally as Mauvais Djo, is a French MC and songwriter. He first gained recognition in the French nightclub scene before beginning his recording career. He co-founded the French hip-hop group Triangle des Bermudes with MC Yoshi and Kokosvoice in 2023 and helped establish its YPDP record label. They released their debut studio album, Triangle des Bermudes 1.0, that July, followed by their second album, Triangle des Bermudes 2.0, in July 2024.

The group gained wider recognition with the release of the EP Franchement! on 14 February 2025. It spawned the Carlos Monsta-written and produced single "Charger", which topped the Ultratop Wallonia chart and peaked at number two in France, number four on Billboard's Luxembourg chart, number 11 on the UK Afrobeats Singles Chart, and number 15 in Switzerland. The trio's third studio album, 404, followed on 3 April 2026 and debuted at number 12 in France, number 24 in Wallonia and number 52 in Switzerland.

Mauvais Djo began his solo career with several releases, including the EP L'Undertaker Part. 1, released in August 2025. It spent 13 weeks on the Dutch chart and reached a peak position of number 32. The EP was supported by "Pilé", which gained wider attention after the Kano Choir YouTube channel uploaded an AI-generated gospel rendition that went viral. Djo subsequently released an official version featuring Kano Choir, Taliixo and DJ Wiils. The gospel version reached number two in Switzerland, number three in the Netherlands, and number eight in both France and Wallonia. The original, co-written by Djo, William Davy Fonseca and Alexis Pereira, topped the French chart and also charted in Germany, Austria and Italy. Djo and Boateng co-founded the independent label Nojoke Record in September 2025, and in March of the next year, his single "Maladie" peaked at number three in France, number five in Switzerland and number 16 in Italy. Djo released his debut studio album, L'Undertaker, Pt. 2, on 4 September 2026 as the follow-up to L'Undertaker Part. 1. It became his first solo top-ten album in France after reaching number 3 on the French Albums Chart.

== Early life and career ==
Mauvais Djo was born Joël Raul Marcolino on 20 October 1997 in Rouen, France, into a Congolese family. He was raised in Évry-Courcouronnes, in the Essonne department of the Île-de-France region. During his youth there, Djo became close friends with MC Yoshi and Kokosvoice. He started out in the local nightlife scene as a nightclub MC, and first entertained crowds in quarter lounges before becoming a sought-after performer in major clubs throughout France. His popularity also earned him invitations to perform at clubs and events across Europe, Africa, and Dubai.

Djo made his music debut in 2020 with his first single, which was well received and helped introduce him to the French rap scene. He went on to collaborate with Aymoune, Werenoi, and SAF, and followed up with early singles including "PD PD" featuring DJ Sucré in 2021 and "Ballon d'or" in 2022.

=== 2023–July 2025: Breakthrough and Triangle des Bermudes ===
On 5 May 2023, Djo joined MC Yoshi and Kokosvoice to release the YPDP-produced collaborative single "Y'a une meuf". On 30 May, Djo followed with the single "Maradona", which featured VK.

After the breakout success of "Y'a une meuf", the three artists officially created the group Triangle des Bermudes (TDB) that same year, which brought together MC Yoshi's powerful flow and stage presence, Djo's deep vocals, and Kokosvoice's melodic delivery, which added harmony to the choruses. Their debut album, Triangle des Bermudes 1.0, was released in July 2023 and featured hit songs such as "Commando" (feat. DJ PIMS), "La Calle", and "Selele" (feat. Bolémvn). On 24 April 2024, they released the single "Lunettes", which has received more than two million views on YouTube and was later included on their second studio album, Triangle des Bermudes 2.0, released on 5 July 2024. Djo also appeared on Issaka Weezy's single "Marrakech" on 10 July.

Triangle des Bermudes released their EP Franchement! through YPDP on 14 February 2025. Its lead single, "Charger", which was written and produced by Carlos Monsta, became their biggest commercial hit. According to Julia Méreau of La Voix du Nord, the song features military-inspired lyrics that mention weapons and the repeated refrain "Chargé, chargé" ("loaded, loaded"). Although the lyrics evoke the idea of "bringing out the guns", the expression is meant in a party setting rather than as a call for violence, which Méreau said makes the track a favorite among young audiences. Léa Lebastard of France Info also pointed out that the lyrics contain references to the popular shooting game Call of Duty, something that is reflected in the song's YouTube music video, and described the song as using the warlike vocabulary commonly heard in rap music.

Despite receiving virtually no radio airplay, "Charger" became a viral success on social media, especially on TikTok. Triangle des Bermudes later performed it at the Les Flammes awards ceremony in May 2025, and it then gained momentum during the Fête de la Musique in Paris on 21 June, when DJs played it in the streets, especially around Châtelet, where videos of large crowds enthusiastically singing along attracted millions of views before drawing huge attention at the Yardland hip-hop festival at the Vincennes Raceourse on 5 July. Videos recorded by hundreds of Yardland attendees quickly spread across social media, and according to Sarah Dupont of L'Éclaireur Fnac, "Charger" became a "sonic meme of the summer". It reached No. 1 in Belgium, No. 2 in France, No. 15 in Switzerland, No. 79 in the Netherlands, No. 4 in Luxembourg (Billboard), No. 64 in Portugal, and No. 11 on the UK Afrobeats Singles Chart. The song was certified diamond in France by SNEP.

=== July 2025–present: Solo breakthrough with "Pilé", 404, and L'Undertaker, Pt. 2 ===
On 18 July 2025, Triangle des Bermudes teamed up with Kaaris for the release of the single "D sur D". Less than a month later, on 15 August, Djo released his debut solo extended play, L'Undertaker Part. 1, which featured the single "Pilé" that achieved international attention after the Kano Choir YouTube channel uploaded an AI-generated gospel version that quickly went viral online. Following the unexpected success of the alternate version, Djo released an official AI gospel version of the song featuring Kano Choir, Taliixo, and Dj Wiils. "Pilé" became his first major solo hit, with the gospel version reaching No. 8 in France, No. 3 in the Netherlands, No. 8 in Wallonia, No. 32 in Flanders, and No. 2 in Switzerland. The original version, which was co-written by Djo, William Davy Fonseca, and Alexis Pereira, peaked at No. 1 in France, No. 20 in the Germany, No. 19 in Austria, and No. 26 in Italy. It was also certified platinum in France.

On 5 September 2025, Djo partnered with Boateng to establish Nojoke Record, an independent label based in Paris. On 20 March of the next year, he released the self-produced single "Maladie", which peaked at No. 3 in France, No. 5 in Switzerland, and No. 16 in Italy. On 3 April, this was followed by the release of Triangle des Bermudes' third studio album, 404. The record included guest appearances from L2B on "À l'aise", Aya Nakamura on "Balek", and Franglish on "Loubard". The next month, they appeared as special guests during all three of Nakamura's concerts at the Stade de France, where they performed "Balek" and "Charger". On 18 June, Djo featured on fellow French rapper and singer R2's single "So Mawa". The next day, he appeared on Keblack and Franglish's collaborative album Energy with the song "Uber". On 4 July, Triangle des Bermudes announced their first headlining concert at the Accor Arena, scheduled for November 2026. Later that month, Djo was featured on GIMS' single "Vive La Monnaie", released on 17 July, before collaborating with Chily on the single "Biberon", which followed on 31 July.

Djo's debut studio album, L'Undertaker, Pt. 2, was released on 4 September 2026 as a sequel to L'Undertaker, Pt. 1. The standard edition featured nine songs, while the deluxe version expanded the track list to ten with the addition of "4". NRJ described the project as a blend of rap and Afro-urban sounds shaped by Djo's Congolese roots. It peaked at number 3 on the French Albums Chart, giving him his first solo top-ten album in France. Elsewhere, it reached number 20 in Wallonia and number 37 in Switzerland. It was supported by "Wagyu", which reached number 12 in France.

== Discography ==
=== With Triangle des Bermudes ===
Title	Details	Peak		
Title	Details	FRA	BEL (Wa)	SWI
Triangle des Bermudes 1.0	Album; Released: 21 July 2023; Label: YPDP	—	—	—
Triangle des Bermudes 2.0	Album; Released: 5 July 2024; Label: YPDP	—	—	—
Franchement!	EP; Released: 14 February 2025; Label: YPDP	31	—	—
404	Album; Released: 3 April 2026; Label: YPDP	12	24	52

=== Solo ===
Title	Details	Peaks			
Title	Details	BEL (WA)	FRA	NLD	SWI
L'Undertaker Part. 1	Released: 15 August 2025; Label: YPDP; Format: EP	—	—	32	—
L'Undertaker, Pt. 2	Released: 4 September 2026; Label: Nojoke Record; Format: Album	20	3	—	37

==== Charted songs ====
Title	Year	Peaks										Certifications	Album
Title	Year	FRA	AUT	BEL (FL)	BEL (WA)	GER	ITA	NLD	SPA	SWI	WW	Certifications	Album
"Pilé" (original version)	2025	1	19	—	—	20	26	—	—	—	44	SNEP: Diamond	L'Undertaker Part. 1
"Pilé" (featuring Kano Choir, Taliixo, and DJ Wiils)	2025	8	—	32	8	—	—	3	—	2	—		Non-album singles
"Maladie"	2026	1	—	—	38	92	16	37	90	5	—	SNEP: Diamond; FIMI: Gold	Non-album singles
"Vive la monnaie" (with Gims)	2026	14	—	—	41	—	—	—	—	—	—		Non-album singles
"Wagyu"	2026	12	—	—	—	—	—	—	—	—	—		L'Undertaker, Pt. 2
"4"	2026	4	—	—	—	—	—	—	—	—	—		L'Undertaker, Pt. 2
"12"	2026	6	—	—	—	—	—	—	—	—	—		L'Undertaker, Pt. 2
