= Kongolese sous BBL =

Single by Theodora

from the album Méga BBL
- Language: French
- Released: 27 September 2024
- Genre: Bouyon; hip-hop
- Length: 2:45
- Label: Boss Lady Records, NFBD, Maison Neptune & NBFD

"Kongolese sous BBL" is a song by French-Congolese singer Theodora, released on 27 September 2024. The single was released from her studio album, "Méga BBL".

== Background ==
Theodora began writing music at the age of 16 and released her first project, the trap-pop extended play Neptune, in 2021. Before releasing music publicly, she spent several years recording extensively in studios while keeping much of her work unreleased. In an interview with GQ France, Theodora explained that she continued making music because she felt she had to fight for her place in the industry and believed she could become part of the pop scene. She also stated that she lacked self-confidence while writing "Kongolese sous BBL" and was going through a toxic relationship at the time. After posting a trailer for the song online, she woke up the next morning to see that it had received around two thousand likes on Twitter and Instagram, a reaction she described as significant because the song was highly autobiographical. The single was released on 27 September 2024 and later appeared on her mixtape Bad Boy Lovestory, released on 1 November 2024. The song's instrumental is based on a bouyon-style remix of the track "FNG" ("Freaky Nasty Girl"), which was initially released in February 2024.

== Lyrics ==
The single is a song of female empowerment where Theodora celebrates her body and beauty as a Black woman without worrying about the norms imposed by society. The title plays on the double meaning of "BBL" (Brazilian Butt Lift , a cosmetic surgical procedure). It is also used as a symbol of self-determination. In an interview with GQ France, Theodora explained that although she did not personally have "curves or BBLs", the song helped her regain confidence and encouraged listeners to feel confident "regardless of their breast size, and regardless of their body type".

Music journalist Steffanee Wang of The Fader noted that the song begins with Theodora humorously addressing the physical discomforts associated with her body image before the track shifts into what Wang described as a "horntastic" and highly energetic instrumental section. In the lyrics, Theodora sings about her body with irony and self-awareness, using humor to discuss insecurities commonly experienced by young women. Wang also observed that Theodora, who described herself as a "weird Black girl" growing up in rural France, transformed that experience into a source of artistic strength. Her growing visibility in French pop music brought additional pressures, including the need to navigate code-switching in media appearances and respond to questions she viewed as "microaggressive", particularly comparisons with the relatively small number of prominent Black female singers in France.

The song also addresses themes of resilience and personal value despite financial difficulties. In the lyric "Je vaux beaucoup, même si parfois je ne joins pas les deux bouts" ("I am worth a lot, even if sometimes I struggle to make ends meet"), Theodora affirms her self-worth despite economic hardship. The chorus, centered around the phrase "Mwasi Sukali", a Lingala expression meaning "sweet woman", reinforces themes of confidence and self-acceptance through the repeated line "j'me lève j'suis déjà belle" ("I wake up already beautiful").

The song also celebrates a carefree and hedonistic lifestyle. Theodora connects "Mwasi Sukali" with the phrase "J'suis pétée sous Cali", a reference to Californian marijuana, turning the chorus into a celebration of letting go of inhibition and enjoying life. She alludes to her bisexuality through the lyrics of the chorus, which refer to a girl named "Pauline" whom she saw the day before.

== Controversy ==
The success of the song sparked controversy within the Caribbean community regarding the use of Bouyon music by a non-Caribbean artist. Theodora responded on X: "I made a bouyon song because I love Afro-Caribbean music; at no point did I claim to have created something that didn't exist. I talked about the origins of bouyon in my stories; I lived on Réunion Island and I didn't discover bouyon on TikTok".

She also added: "The problem comes from the top: from radio stations, media outlets, platforms to which Caribbean people do not have access. In truth, this inaccessibility also results from racism towards people from overseas and the different Creole cultures".

== Composition ==
- Theodora - singing and writing
- Jeez Suave - production and writing

== Commercial reception ==
In early November 2024, the track recorded a meteoric rise from 113th to 35th place in the SNEP chart, an increase of 69%.

== Weekly charts ==
Chart (2024)	Peak position
Belgium (Wallonia Ultratop 50 Singles)	34
France (SNEP)	10

== Certifications ==
Region	Certification	Certified units/sales
Belgium (BRMA)	Gold	20,000^{‡}
France (SNEP)	Diamond	333,333^{‡}
^{‡} Sales+streaming figures based on certification alone.
