= God Bless (song) =

Single by Hamza featuring Damso
- Language: French
- Released: 19 December 2019
- Genre: Electro-rap
- Length: 3:00
- Label: Rec. 118
- Songwriters: Hamza; Damso
- Producer: Ozo Touch

Music video
- "God Bless" on YouTube

God Bless is a song released in 19 December 2019 by Belgian rappers Hamza and Damso.

== Charts ==
Chart performance for "God Bless"
Chart (2019–20)	Peak position
Belgium (Ultratip Bubbling Under Flanders)	35
Belgium (Ultratop 50 Wallonia)	10
France (SNEP)	8
Switzerland (Schweizer Hitparade)	75

== Certifications ==
Certifications for "God Bless"
Region	Certification	Certified units/sales
France (SNEP)	Platinum	200,000^{‡}
^{‡} Sales+streaming figures based on certification alone.
