= Josman =

French Rapper (born 1992)

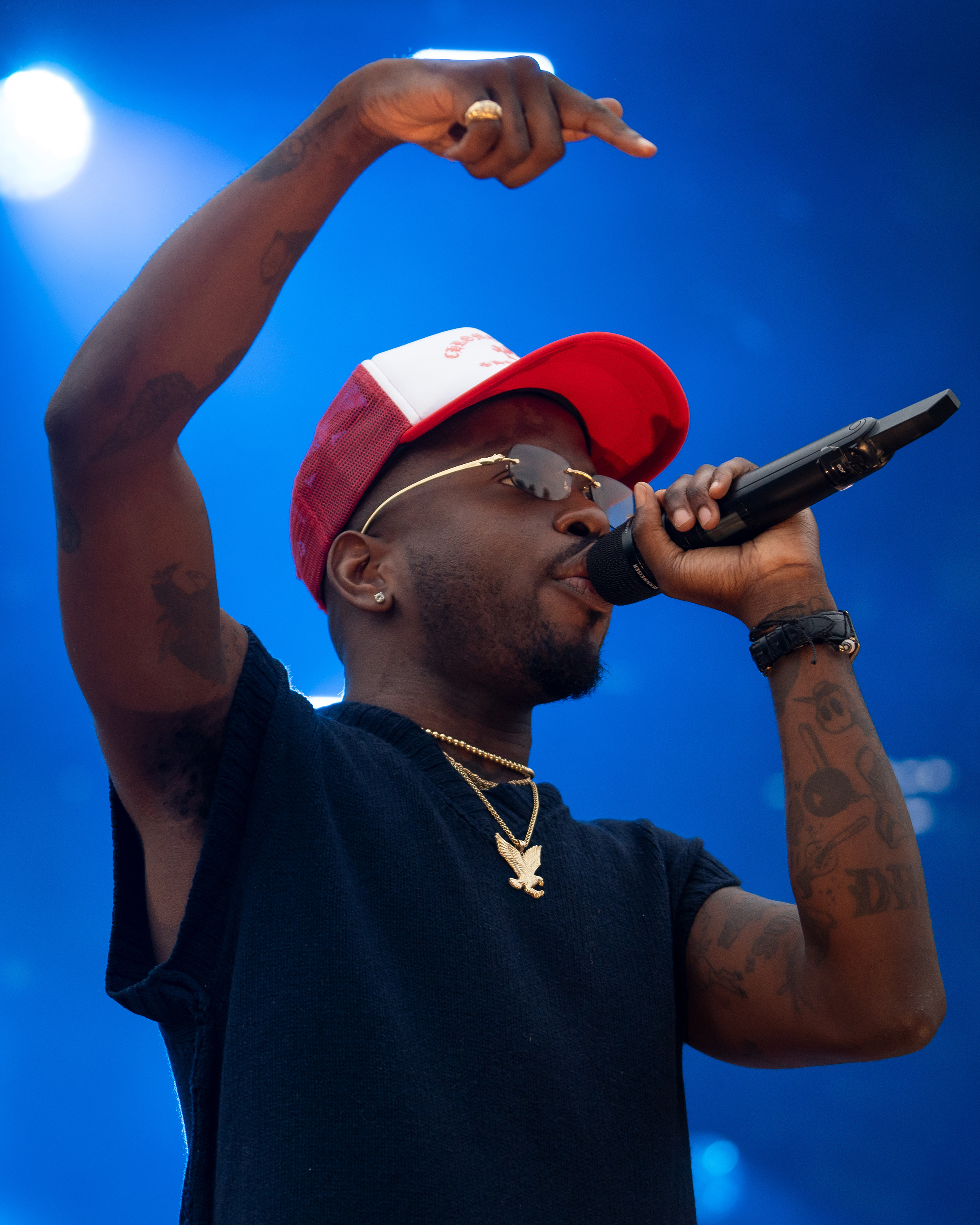
- Josman at the 2023 La Nuit de l'Erdre festival

Background information
- Born: José Nzengo; 28 October 1992 (age 33); Vierzon, France
- Genres: Hip hop, Conscious hip hop, Hardcore hip hop
- Occupation: Rapper
- Years active: 2013–present

José Nzengo (born 28 October, 1992, in Vierzon), better known by his stage name Josman, is a French rapper of Congolese and Angolan origins.

== Biography ==
José Nzengo was born and raised in Vierzon, in the department of Cher, in a family of Congolese and Angolan origins. He discovered hip-hop culture thanks to his sister, who introduced him to various R&B American rappers and singers.

== Career ==
He began rapping in his room in 2007, on instrumentals he created, but he rose to prominence in 2013, thanks to his victory in the "End of the Weak" freestyle competition. He subsequently participated in the MasterClasse program on the broadcaster France 4, and was noticed by rapper Orelsan, who was impressed by his attitude and his music.

He released the 9-song mixtape Échecs positifs in 2015, followed the following year by Matrix, with a concept based on the film series of the same name. This mixtape allowed him to reach the general public, thanks also to the success of the track Dans le vide. The following year it was the turn of 000$, which also had a good response from the public.

On December 14, 2018, his first studio album, entitled J.O.$., subsequently certified platinum, was released, whereas the song J'aime bien! contained in it was certified diamond. On March 5, 2020, he released his second album Split, containing 23 tracks and featuring Leto, Seth Gueko, Zed, Hamza and Chily.

After releasing two EPs (Mystr J.O.$. and HHHH) in 2021, his third studio album was made available on March 18, 2022. Called M.A.N (Black Roses & Lost Feelings), it consisted of 17 songs, and featured guests such as Guy2Bezbar, Naza and Laylow. This project also achieved good commercial success. He obtained several awards at Les Flammes ceremony in May 2023: the Flame for the song of the year and the one for the music video of the year for his song Intro, as well as the one for the album cover of the year for his album M.A.N.

On October 28, 2023, he unexpectedly released the mixtape J.000.$, on his 31st birthday.

== Discography ==
=== Studio albums ===
- J.O.$. (2018)
- Split (2020)
- M.A.N (Black Roses & Lost Feelings) (2022)
- Dom Perignon Crying (2025)

=== Mixtapes ===
- Échecs positifs (2015)
- Matrix (2016)
- 000$ (2017)
- J.000.$ (2023)

=== EPs ===
- Fly Pack (2015)
- Mystr J.O.$. (2021)
- HHHH (2021)

== Awards and nominations ==
Award Ceremony	Year	Work	Category	Result
Berlin Music Video Awards	2019	Un Zder, Un Thé	Best Editor	Nominated
Berlin Music Video Awards	2023	Intro	Best Concept	Nominated
