= Fashion Designa =

Single by Theodora

from the album Méga BBL
- Language: French
- Released: 31 October 2024
- Genre: Hip-hop
- Length: 3:05
- Label: Boss Lady Records, NFBD, Maison Neptune & NBFD

"Fashion Designa" is a song by French-Congolese singer Theodora, released on 31 October 2024, as a single from her studio album Méga BBL.

== Background ==
The song is included in the mixtape Bad Boy Lovestory released on 1 November 2024.

== Music video ==
The music video was released on 4 June 2025 and was directed by Melchior Leroux. Much of the video was largely created using green screen techniques, with much of its structure finalized during post-production rather than from a strict storyboard. The finished piece blends modern digital effects with a purposely retro texture, achieved by recreating the look of a 1980s studio.

It is set in a futuristic, stylized universe in which Theodora appears as a cosmic "Boss Lady", standing on a planet and drifting through a star-filled landscape. The visuals draw heavily on Afrofuturism and combine bold graphic imagery with a retro-inspired aesthetic. According to Leroux, the concept was influenced mainly by Grace Jones and Jean-Paul Goude, alongside references to Michel Ocelot, whose aesthetic is echoed in the sculpted hairstyles, long geometric dresses, and jewelry. The dancers, their movements driven by the almost impulsive onomatopoeia of the music, are positioned at various locations and moments throughout the video, which recalls the extravagant videos of Rita Mitsouko. Theodora's face is projected large across half the screen as a miniature dancer moves across a lawn painted like a canvas. Above her, Theodora's arms form an arc in a semicircle. Célestine Pelca of Beware Magazine also noted the influence of Salvador Dalí, particularly in its use of distorted scale and surreal compositions, such as "the inversion of elements in the foreground and background" and the juxtaposition of enlarged and miniature figures. The video also incorporates visual homages to Andy Warhol and Piet Mondrian, as well as a scene inspired by The Little Prince. Less explicit references include the work of Saul Bass, particularly his experimental title sequences, and visual motifs inspired by film openings such as Monsters, Inc. and OSS 117: Lost in Rio. Leroux stated that the project was developed with significant creative freedom, with Theodora's primary direction being the use of Afrofuturism. Pelca noted that the presence of absurd elements, such as the artist's mouth multiplied when several doors open, or Theodora in profile on a crescent moon, enhances the video's sense of surprise and visual appreciation.

The video was widely praised upon release and generated strong audience engagement online.

== Composition ==
- Theodora - singing and writing
- John Makabi - production

== Charts ==
=== Weekly charts ===
Chart (2024)	Peak position
Belgium (Ultratop 50 Wallonia)	37
France (SNEP)	12

== Certification ==
Region	Certification	Certified units/sales
Belgium (BRMA)	Gold	20,000^{‡}
France (SNEP)	Diamond	333,333^{‡}
^{‡} Sales+streaming figures based on certification alone.

== Distinctions ==
Year	Rewards	Categories	Result	Ref.
2025	NRJ Music Awards	Social Hit	Appointment	
2026	Victoires de la Musique	Création audiovisuelle	Winner	
