= Hamza (rapper) =

Moroccan-Belgian rapper and producer (born 1994)

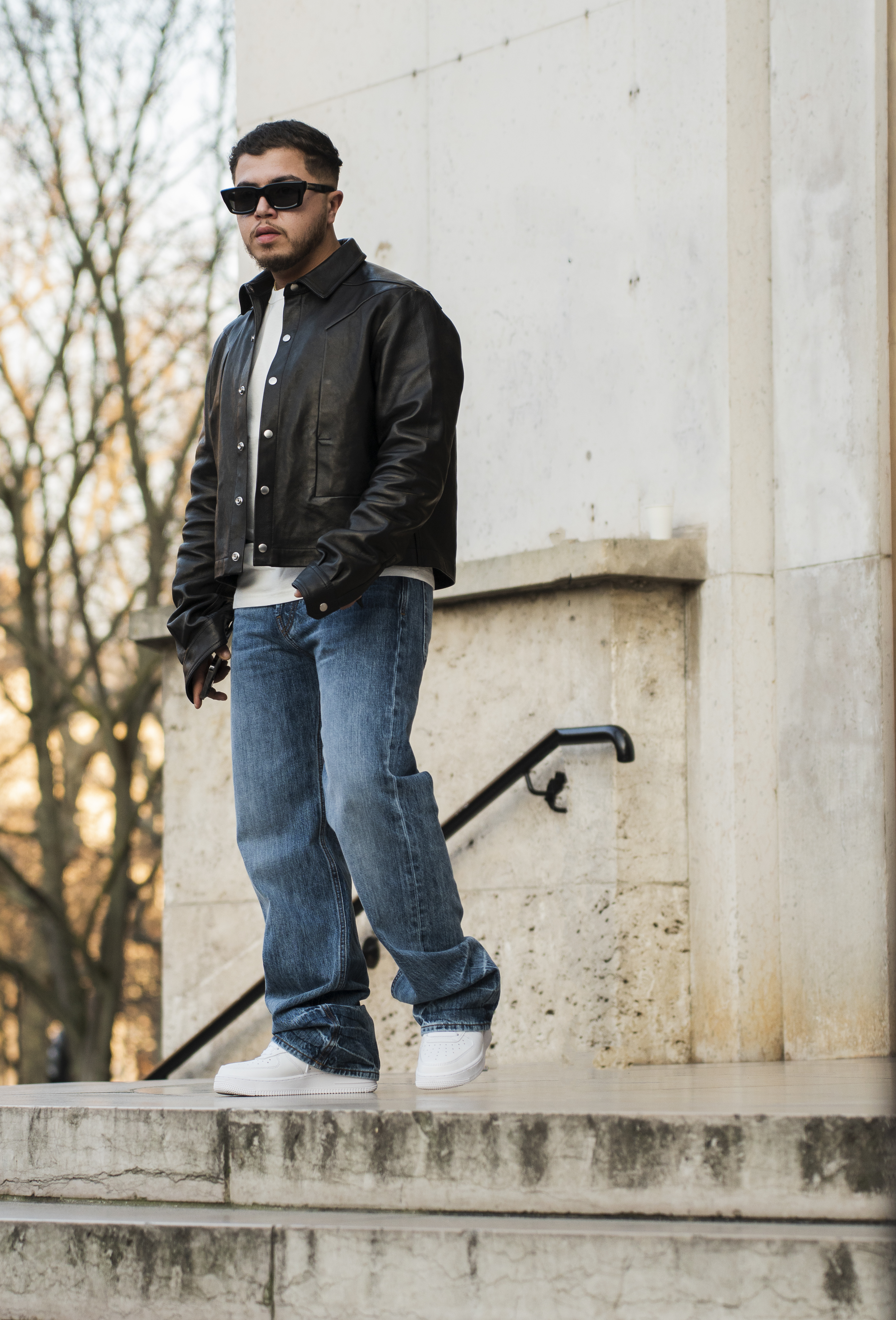

Background information
- Also known as: SauceGod
- Born: Hamza Al-Farissi; 1 August 1994 (age 32); Laeken, Brussels-Capital, Belgium
- Genres: French rap; hip hop; trap; R&B
- Occupations: Rapper, singer, songwriter, record producer
- Years active: 2012–present
- Labels: Just Woke Up, Rec. 118, Warner Music

Hamza Al-Farissi (Arabic: حمزة الفارسي, romanized: Ḥamza al-Fārsī; French: [amza al faʁisi]; born 1 August 1994), better known mononymously as Hamza, is a Moroccan-Belgian rapper, singer and record producer. Hamza was signed to Rec. 118 and Warner Music.

== Career ==
Born in Laeken, a district of Brussels, to parents of Moroccan origin, he formed the hip hop band Kilogramme Gang as an adolescent with his friends Triton and MK. He also used the logo "Saucegod". The band released the urban project Gotham City Vol. 1. Hamza composed the beats used by the band.

After the band broke up, Hamza went solo in 2013 releasing his solo debut Recto Verso. After meeting Dakose, he resumed his musical activity with the latter as his manager. In May 2015, he released the mixtape H-24 exclusively on the site HauteCulture.com, gaining public attention in Belgium and France. This was followed by the project Zombie Life with wider appeal, and in 2016, the EP New Casanova with dancehall beats. In December 2016, he added the mixtape Santa Sauce, made available for free on SoundCloud.

The mixtape 1994 has been his major chart success, making it to number 13 on the French Belgian albums chart and to number 9 in France. A number of singles also charted including "Life", "Vibes" and "Paradise".

His debut studio album Paradise was released in March 2019. The album includes featurings with Aya Nakamura, Christine & the Queens, Oxmo Puccinno, 13 Block, SCH, and A.CHAL. In December, he released the mixtape Santa Sauce 2 which featured Damso, Koba LaD and Gambi.

140 BPM 2 was released on 5 February 2021 as a sequel to the 140 BPM which had released a year prior. The project includes featurings with Headie One, Gazo, Guy2Bezbar and Kaaris.

On 17 February 2023, he released the album Sincèrement. The project featured Tiakola, Damso, Offset and Ckay.

After a long time of teasing, Hamza released the much awaited album Mania on 20 June 2025 . The album saw features from Kittitian singer Byron Messia, Nigerian singer Rema, and French rapper Werenoi among others. The album was supported by singles such as "KYKY2BONDY" and "Bottega Venetta".

== Discography ==
=== Albums ===
Album	Year	Peak positions					Certifications
Album	Year	BEL (WA)	BEL (FL)	CAN	FRA	SWI	Certifications
Paradise	2019	2	35	—	2	—	SNEP: Platinum
Santa Sauce 2	2019	21	182	—	29	73	SNEP: Gold
140 BPM 2	2021	1	20	—	1	8	
Sincèrement	2023	1	8	66	1	2	
Mania	2025	1	22	—	1	1	
"—" denotes a recording that did not chart or was not released in that territory.

=== Mixtapes ===
Album	Year	Peak positions			Certifications
Album	Year	BEL (WA)	BEL (FL)	FRA	Certifications
Recto Verso	2013	—	—	—	
H-24	2015	—	—	—	
Zombie Life	2016	37	—	—	
Santa Sauce	2016	—	—	—	
1994	2017	13	126	9	SNEP: Platinum

=== EPs ===
EP	Year
New Casanova	2016
140 BPM	2020

=== Singles ===
==== As lead artist ====
Title	Year	Peak positions			Certifications	Album
Title	Year	BEL (WA)	FRA	SWI	Certifications	Album
"Gozilla"	2017	Tip	166	—		1994
"Destiny's Child"	2017	Tip	—	—		1994
"Vibes"	2017	11 (Ultratip*)	73	—	SNEP: Gold	1994
"Life"	2017	12 (Ultratip*)	56	—	SNEP: Diamond	1994
"Paradise"	2019	26 (Ultratip*)	59	—		Paradise
"HS" (featuring SCH)	2019	20	7	—	SNEP: Gold	Paradise
"Netflix"	2020	Tip	91	—		140 BPM
"Réel"	2021	15	8	97		140 BPM 2
"Introduction"	2023	27	9	84		Sincèrement
"Free YSL"	2023	6	4	20		Sincèrement
"Ma réalité"	2023	9	5	—		Sincèrement
"Sadio" (with Offset)	2023	2	2	6		Sincèrement
"Nocif" (with Damso)	2023	2	1	14		Sincèrement
"Drifté"	2023	43	—	—		Non-album single
"En mieux" (with PLK)	2024	38	—	—		Chambre 140 (Part.2)
"Toka" (with SDM)	2024	49	—	—		Non-album singles
"Diana" (with DJ Snake)	2024	—	—	—		Non-album singles
"Kyky2bondy"	2025	1	1	3		Mania
"Dragons" (with Werenoi)	2025	17	6	44		
"—" denotes a recording that did not chart or was not released in that territory.

*Did not appear in the official Belgian Ultratop 50 charts, but rather in the bubbling under Ultratip charts.

==== As featured artist ====
Title	Year	Peak positions			Certifications	Album
Title	Year	BEL (WA)	FRA	SWI	Certifications	Album
"Elle m'a dit" (DJ Quick feaaturing Hamza and Ninho)	2021	—	18	—		Mal Luné Music
"Fade Up" (Zeg P featuring Hamza and Sch)	2022	1	5	72	SNEP: Diamond	Non-album singles
"Panama" (Kaaris featuring Hamza)	2024	29	—	—		Non-album singles
"Maudit" (Werenoi featuring Hamza)	2024	20	—	—		Pyramide
"Mes lovés" (Ponko featuring Hamza)	2024	41	—	—		Non-album singles
"Tentation" (Gambi featuring Hamza)	2024	50	19	—		Non-album singles
"—" denotes a recording that did not chart or was not released in that territory.

=== Other charted songs ===
Title	Year	Peak positions			Certifications	Album
Title	Year	BEL (WA)	FRA	SWI	Certifications	Album
"Juste une minute"	2017	—	78	—	SNEP: Gold	1994
"Mucho Love"	2017	—	110	—		1994
"Jodeci mob"	2017	—	154	—		1994
"Pas de remords"	2017	—	158	—		1994
"Mi gyal"	2017	—	172	—		1994
"1994"	2017	—	183	—	SNEP: Gold	1994
"Silicone"	2017	—	190	—		1994
"Cash Time"	2017	—	191	—		1994
"Bae" (Caballero & JeanJass feat. Hamza)	2018	—	162	—		Double hélice 3
"Dale x Love Therapy" (feat. Aya Nakamura)	2019	—	13	—	SNEP: Gold	Paradise
"Validé"	2019	—	34	—		Paradise
"Audemars Shit"	2019	—	38	—		Paradise
"50x"	2019	—	39	—		Paradise
"Sometimes"	2019	—	49	—		Paradise
"Minuit 13" (feat. Christine and the Queens & Oxmo Puccino)	2019	—	49	—		Paradise
"Henny me noie"	2019	—	54	—		Paradise
"Addiction"	2019	—	75	—		Paradise
"Le même sort"	2019	—	83	—		Paradise
"Blue Crystal"	2019	—	90	—		Paradise
"Mac & Cheese"	2019	—	99	—		Paradise
"Deep Inside"	2019	—	101	—		Paradise
"Meilleur"	2019	—	107	—		Paradise
"Gynéco"	2019	—	133	—		Paradise
"Galerie"	2019	—	156	—		Paradise
"Clic Clac" (featuring 13 Block)	2019	—	64	—		Paradise
"Céline"	2019	—	171	—		Paradise
"God Bless" (featuring Damso)	2019	10	8	75	SNEP: Diamond	Santa Sauce 2
"Gasolina" (featuring Gambi)	2019	27	—	—	SNEP: Platinum	Santa Sauce 2
"Bac + 12"	2019	—	67	—		Santa Sauce 2
"Late nights"	2019	—	124	—		Santa Sauce 2
"Belek"	2019	—	136	—		Santa Sauce 2
"G's Up Hoes Down"	2019	—	142	—		Santa Sauce 2
"Oseille"	2019	—	166	—		Santa Sauce 2
"Sans signes"	2019	—	186	—		Santa Sauce 2
"Go Back"	2019	—	189	—		Santa Sauce 2
"Por la vida"	2019	—	198	—		Santa Sauce 2
"B!tch" (Josman featuring Hamza)	2020	—	99	—		Split
"Nobu"	2020	—	113	—		140 BPM
"Henni Pop"	2020	—	188	—		140 BPM
"Pilote" (PLK featuring Hamza)	2020	5	5	42	SNEP: Platinum	Enna
"BXL Zoo" (Damso featuring Hamza)	2020	1	3	16	SNEP: Gold; BEA: Gold	QALF
"PTSD"	2021	—	24	—		140 BPM 2
"Keke"	2021	—	28	—		140 BPM 2
"Spaghetti" (featuring Gazo & Guy2Bezbar)	2021	—	35	—		140 BPM 2
"Don't Tell" (featuring Headie One)	2021	—	41	—		140 BPM 2
"Fake Friends"	2021	—	52	—		140 BPM 2
"Jalousie"	2021	—	53	—		140 BPM 2
"Cheikh"	2021	—	55	—		140 BPM 2
"Gang Activity"	2021	—	68	—		140 BPM 2
"Hara-Kiri" (featuring Kaaris)	2021	—	74	—		140 BPM 2
"Torino"	2021	—	76	—		140 BPM 2
"Spider"	2021	—	78	—		140 BPM 2
"AMG Technology"	2021	—	89	—		140 BPM 2
"Window Shopper Part. 2" (Laylow featuring Hamza)	2021	17	—	—		L'étrange histoire de Mr. Anderson
"Slide" (Franglish featuring Hamza)	2021	—	141	—		Vibe
"Ouais Ouais" (Leto featuring Hamza)	2021	24	—	—		17%
"Jota" (Niska featuring Hamza)	2021	44	10	54	SNEP: Gold	Le monde est méchant
"Atasanté" (Tiakola featuring Hamza)	2022	38	—	—	SNEP: Gold	Mélo
"Au bout de la nuit"	2023	—	8	—		Sincèrement
"Only U"	2023	—	12	—		Sincèrement
"Tsunami"	2023	—	10	—		Sincèrement
"Atasanté Part.2" (with Tiakola)	2023	—	6	—		Sincèrement
"Codéine 19"	2023	29	7	—		Sincèrement
"Nasa"	2023	—	16	—		Sincèrement
"WWE"	2023	—	22	—		Sincèrement
"Cocoro" (with CKay)	2023	—	19	—		Sincèrement
"Murder"	2023	—	20	—		Sincèrement
"Plus jamais la même"	2023	—	21	—		Sincèrement
"I Love U"	2023	—	27	—		Sincèrement
"Sincèrement"	2023	—	35	—		Sincèrement
"Miss Lily's" (with Dinos)	2025	—	100	—		Non-album song
"Toxic" (featuring Rema)	2025	25	14	43		Mania
"Encore une nuit"	2025	36	31	—		Mania
"Yesterday"	2025	—	47	—		Mania
"Slovakia"	2025	—	50	—		Mania
"Bottega Veneta"	2025	—	51	—		Mania
"Come and See Me"	2025	—	54	—		Mania
"Oscar De La Hoya"	2025	—	55	—		Mania
"Location" (with Byron Messia)	2025	—	68	—		Mania
"Afri"	2025	—	69	—		Mania
"Forever"	2025	—	76	—		Mania
"Smokin' and Drinkin'"	2025	—	79	—		Mania
"Megan"	2025	—	85	—		Mania
"Destiny"	2025	—	98	—		Mania
"—" denotes a recording that did not chart or was not released in that territory.
