= Theodora (singer) =

French-Congolese singer (born 2003)

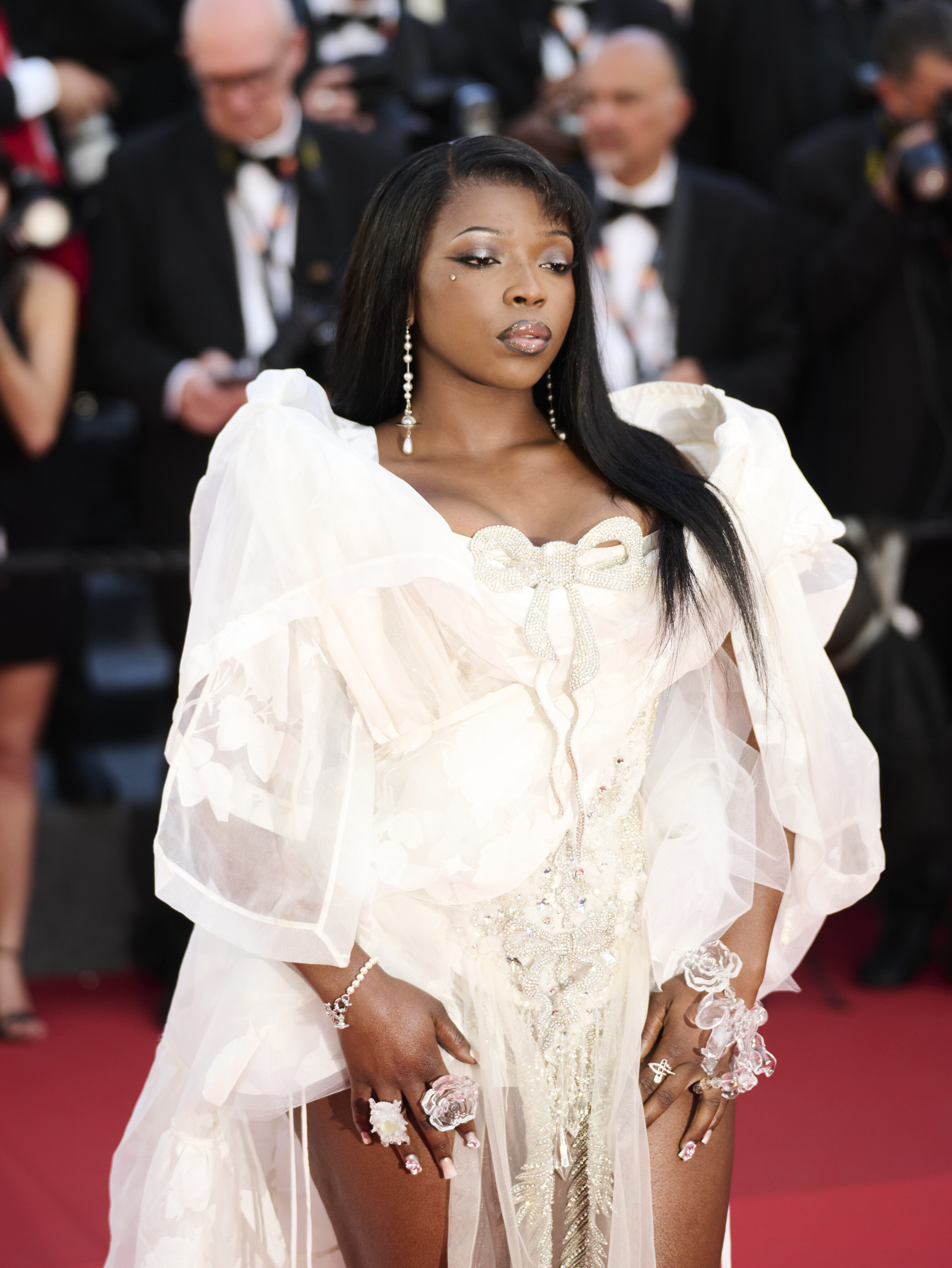
- Theodora at the 2026 Cannes Film Festival

Background information
- Also known as: Boss Lady; Miss Kitoko
- Born: Lili Théodora Mbangayo Mujinga; 23 October 2003 (age 23); Lucerne, Switzerland
- Genres: Hyperpop; bouyon; hip-hop; contemporary R&B; calypso; shatta; amapiano; zouk; new wave; rock
- Occupations: Singer; songwriter; dancer; television personality
- Years active: 2018–present
- Labels: Neptune Production; Maison Neptune X NBDF; Boss Lady Records

Lili Théodora Mbangayo Mujinga (French pronunciation: [lili teodɔʁa ɛmbɑ̃ɡajo mudʒiŋɡa]; born 23 October 2003), known professionally as Theodora or Boss Lady, is a French-Congolese singer, rapper, songwriter, dancer and TV personality. She began her music career working alongside her older brother, Jeez Suave, who produced her music, encouraged her singing, and acted as her composer and manager. At age 15, she released her debut single, "La thune", in November 2018, followed by her trap-pop extended play (EP), Neptune, in January 2021, which was released through their independent label, Neptune Production.

Theodora first received mainstream recognition with the Caribbean bouyon-inspired smash hit "Kongolese sous BBL", which was released in September 2024. The song went viral on TikTok, becoming a body-positive anthem and sparking dance and lip-sync trends across social media. It peaked at No. 10 on the SNEP Top Singles chart for one week, reached No. 34 on Belgium's Ultratop Wallonia (charting for seven weeks), entered Spotify's Top 50 France, climbed to No. 3 on Spotify's Top Viral Global chart, and accumulated over 2.3 billion streams worldwide, including more than three million in the UK. The single was certified diamond by SNEP and gold by the BRMA, and was included on her debut mixtape, Bad Boy Lovestory, which was released in November 2024 through Boss Lady Records. The mixtape peaked at No. 2 on the SNEP Top Albums chart, remaining at that position for seven consecutive weeks, and reached No. 14 on the Ultratop Wallonia chart. It was later certified triple platinum by SNEP. A deluxe edition, Méga BBL, followed in May 2025, debuting at No. 15 in Wallonia and No. 21 in Switzerland, and was certified platinum by SNEP. That month, she won the Best Female Revelation at Les Flammes, and by 2026, Méga BBL won the Album of the Year at the Victoires de la Musique, and also received the Spotify Flame for Album of the Year and Best New Pop Album at Les Flammes.

In August 2025, Le Monde described Theodora as the "pop phenomenon of the summer", noting that her inclusive songs had made her "the new boss of pop in France". Billboard France reported that she was the most-streamed female francophone artist of the year in France. In September 2025, she guest-performed on Disiz's song "Melodrama", which topped the SNEP chart for ten consecutive weeks, reached No. 1 on Ultratop Wallonia, and No. 8 on the Swiss Hitparade. In November 2025, GQ France named her Woman of the Year, and in April 2026, she became the face of the Angel Nova perfume by Mugler.

Theodora's television career began with a guest role on the fourth season of Nouvelle École, which streamed on Netflix from 31 October to 14 November 2025. In January 2026, she joined the show's judging panel for its fifth season.

== Early life and education ==
Lili Théodora Mbangayo Mujinga was born in Lucerne, Switzerland, on 23 October 2003, to Congolese parents living in exile after political persecution. Her grandfather was a member of the opposition party Union for Democracy and Social Progress (UDPS). Her father joined the Forces Armées Zaïroises (FAZ) during the late 1990s to qualify for a government scholarship program in Greece. Before he could finish, Mobutu's government collapsed after Laurent-Désiré Kabila took power. Théodora told Numéro that the military students were abandoned by the new government, which left her father without financial support and forced him to put his studies on hold. Her older brother, known by the stage name Jeez Suave, was born on 5 January 2000 in Athens. The family later moved to Switzerland, where Théodora was born, before they returned to Greece and later lived on Réunion Island. Her father completed his medical degree in his early forties. Théodora also told France Inter that her mother put her own medical studies on hold to raise the children. By 2025, her father was working as a gynecologist.

In 2008, after Greece's financial crisis, the family left the country. They first stopped in the Democratic Republic of the Congo and then on Réunion Island. They later moved to mainland France in 2009, living in several parts of France, including Val-d'Oise, Bordeaux, and Brittany before settling in Saint-Denis. After arriving in France, the family initially lived together in a small studio apartment before her father's medical career improved their financial situation. Although born in Switzerland, she does not hold Swiss citizenship because Switzerland does not grant birthright citizenship and has said she feels no particular attachment to the country. Having completed her schooling in France, she acquired French citizenship by declaration at age 13 or 14. Alongside her studies, she practiced judo and competed in French national tournaments.

She earned her Baccalauréat in 2021 in Vitré, where she was classmates with the French streamer and online content creator Anyme. Initially interested in politics, she enrolled in the ENS D1 preparatory program in Vannes, which she left after six months. She later joined the Brittany Regional Youth Council and became president of its culture commission.

== Music career ==
=== 2018–2022: Career beginnings and Neptune ===
Theodora on stage during her appearance at Paléo Festival in 2026

Théodora's first exposure to music came through her father, who explored the local musical culture whenever the family moved to a new country. She also told the French-language online magazine Abcdr du son that her mother was a fan of Koffi Olomide and introduced her to Congolese artists including, Mbilia Bel, Tshala Muana, and Fally Ipupa, as well as Cameroonian singer Lady Ponce. In an interview with France Info, she cited Rihanna as the artist who left the strongest impression on her, saying that seeing a Black woman succeed in pop music gave her a strong sense of representation. France Info also noted that she often recorded ambient sounds, including television commercials she heard in Kinshasa.

One of the first artists she listened to when she moved to France was the French rapper La Fouine and the rap group XV Barbar, which led her to discover PSO Thug. She later expanded her musical interests to artists like Young Thug, Drake, and The Weeknd. At the age of ten, Theodora bought her first albums, including those by Stromae and Maître Gims, and attended her first live concert to see Indila. Although she first became involved in performing through dance, she began writing music after working with Suave, who produced the beats and encouraged her to sing. In November 2018, at the age of 15, Theodora released her debut single, "La thune". Before entering the École normale supérieure preparatory program in Vannes, she chose to focus on music instead. Her father opposed her decision and told her she would be on her own if she followed a music career, though they reconciled by 2025.

She began developing her trap-pop Extended Play (EP), Neptune, with Suave. What started as a bedroom project eventually moved to Le Block in Rennes, a community studio that offered professional-quality recordings at a modest cost. As the project developed, Theodora and Suave organized their first festival and officially released Neptune on Spotify on 10 January 2021 through their independent label, Neptune Production.

=== 2023–September 2024: Lili Aux Paradis Artificiels, Lili aux paradis artificiels: tome 2, and breakthrough ===
Theodora performing live for festivalgoers in Nyon, Switzerland

Theodora began to attract attention on the Paris music scene in 2022 with the track "Le Paradis se trouve dans le 93" ("Paradise is found in the 93rd district"), co-written with Suave. The music video, funded with money she had saved while working at McDonald's, pays tribute to Seine-Saint-Denis over an animated drum-and-bass production. The song was later included on her six-track EP Lili Aux Paradis Artificiels, which was released on 15 March 2023 under Maison Neptune X NBDF. Lili Aux Paradis Artificiels also featured tracks such as "Ici le temps est trop morose", "C trop la loose", "Liliroxk", "Dans le paradis artificiel", and "Après l'orage". Most of the songs were co-written with Suave, who also produced the EP.

On 10 January 2023, she took part in the Île-de-France regional auditions for the iNOUïS du Printemps de Bourges at La Maroquinerie. The sequel, Lili aux paradis artificiels: tome 2, was released on 6 July 2023 and included five new tracks: "...Y'a deux fois plus d'orage", "Besoin d'aide", "J'ai retrouvé le sourire", "Boss Lady" and "Love me lagadou". The EP featured guest appearances from Implaccable and production contributions from Pedro Da Linha, Sutus, Koboi, MEI, Neophron, and Suave. It stood out for its rapid tempos, over which Theodora expressed her "innermost feelings, whether euphoric or tinged with the deepest melancholy".

On 27 September 2024, she achieved major commercial success with "Kongolese sous BBL", a Caribbean bouyon-inspired track that went viral on TikTok, as it evolved into a "body-positive anthem" and fueled dance challenges and lip-sync skits across social platforms. Jeremie Leger of the French rap outlet Rap City noted that "Kongolese sous BBL" challenges stereotypes surrounding the hyper-feminized and hypersexualized image of Black women. The acronym "BBL" refers variously to Brazilian Butt Lift, Big Boss Lady (her nickname), or Bad Boy Lovestory, the title of her debut mixtape. The song also playfully responds to critics who mock her lyrics, criticism she suggests is often thinly disguised racism, and, unbothered by online attacks, particularly on X (formerly Twitter), she has reacted with humor. The Fader described the song as having "palpable energy" and "hilarious" songwriting. The song peaked at No. 10 on the SNEP Top Singles chart for one week and reached No. 34 on Belgium's Ultratop Wallonia, where it charted for seven weeks; it also entered Spotify's Top 50 France, received airplay on NRJ and Skyrock, climbed to No. 3 on Spotify's Top Viral Global chart, and accumulated more than 2.3 billion streams worldwide, including over 3 million in the UK. It became the first bouyon song performed by a non-Caribbean artist to receive gold certification in France in 2024 and was later certified diamond by SNEP and gold by the BRMA.

=== November 2024–present: Bad Boy Lovestory, Méga BBL, "Melodrama", and standalone releases ===
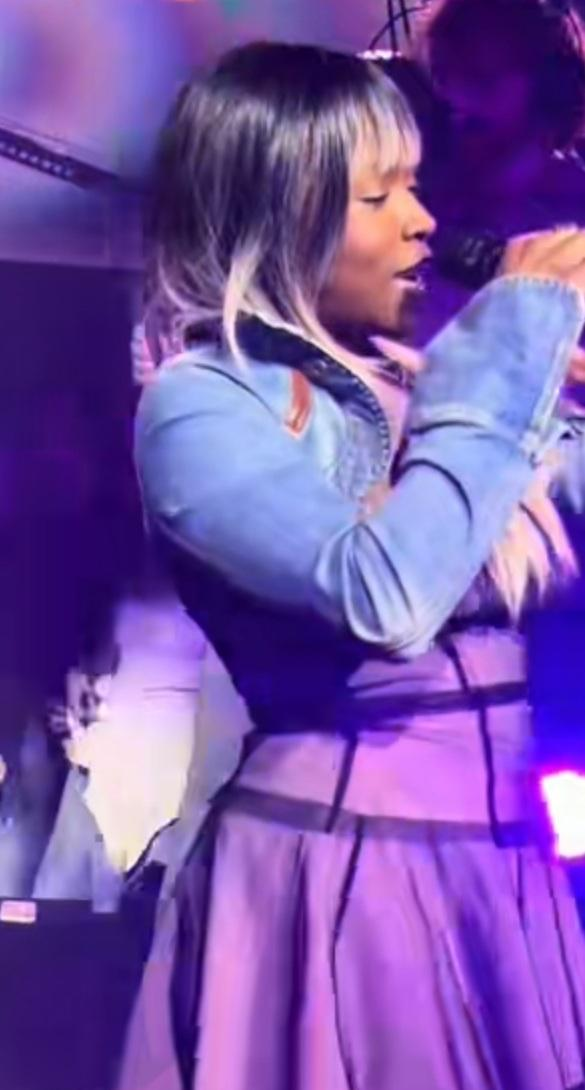
Theodora performing at the Zawa Show in December 2024

Shortly afterward, on 1 November 2024, Theodora released her debut mixtape, Bad Boy Lovestory, through Boss Lady Records. The Fader described it as a "sugary fizz of dance, electronic, dancehall, and more". Featuring collaborations with Guy2Bezbar, Zoomy, Suave, and Jahlys, the mixtape merges Afropop influences with Caribbean genres. Commercially, Bad Boy Lovestory peaked at No. 2 on the SNEP Top Albums chart for three consecutive weeks, No. 14 on Ultratop Wallonia, and No. 100 on the Swiss Hitparade, as well as earning triple platinum certification from SNEP. It includes the hit "Kongolese sous BBL". The track "FNG", short for "freaky nasty girl", embraces her bold, unconventional persona. Beneath its upbeat sound, Bad Boy Lovestory explores themes of mental health, toxic relationships, and self-reflection. The Lasso-produced, SNEP platinum-certified "Ils me rient tous au nez" ("they all laugh in my face") explores the emotional struggle of someone overly generous who ends up ignored and ridiculed. Meanwhile, the amapiano-influenced "Fashion Designa", also produced by Suave, accentuates her confident and self-empowered persona, and it was certified diamond in France and spent two weeks at No. 12 on the SNEP Top Singles chart. "Fashion Designa" won her Original Song at the 2026 Victoires de la Musique and was also nominated for Audiovisual Creation, as well as for Music Video of the Year at Les Flammes.

A deluxe edition titled Méga BBL was issued in May 2025. This expanded version includes additional collaborations with Chilly Gonzales, Juliette Armanet, Jul, and Luidji. It debuted at No. 15 on Ultratop Wallonia and No. 21 on the Swiss Hitparade, and was certified platinum in France. The release was supported by "PAY!" (featuring Guy2Bezbar), "Do U Wanna?", "Zou Bizou" (featuring Jul), "Masoko Na Mabele" (featuring London), and "Mon bébé" (featuring Brazy). Méga BBL won Album of the Year at the 2026 Victoires de la Musique, while at Les Flammes it received the Spotify Flame for Album of the Year, Best New Pop Album, and Album Cover of the Year, with "Mon bébé" also earning a nomination for European and/or International Collaboration of the Year.

On 13 May, at the 2025 edition of Les Flammes, Theodora performed a medley of her songs "Fashion Designa" and "Do U Wanna?". She received the award for the Female Revelation of the Year, notably for "Kongolese sous BBL". In June 2025, she sold-out three consecutive concerts at Zénith Paris. Throughout the summer, she performed at major French festivals including Yardland, Les Vieilles Charrues, and Cabaret Vert. In August, Le Monde described her as the "pop phenomenon of the summer" and noted that with the success of her inclusive songs, she had become "the new boss of pop in France". That month, Billboard France reported that Theodora was the second most-streamed female francophone artist of the year in France, behind Aya Nakamura. On 12 September 2025, she performed on the Angela Davis stage at the Fête de l'Humanité in La Courneuve. The performance, attended by one of the festival's largest crowds, was noted for its political themes and was described as the most significant concert of her 2025 tour by her entourage.

On 26 September, Theodora featured on Disiz's single "Melodrama", from his 14th album On s'en rappellera pas. The song topped the SNEP Top Singles chart for ten consecutive weeks, reached No. 1 on the Ultratop Wallonia chart, and peaked at No. 9 on the Swiss Hitparade. It marked her first chart-topping single and Disiz's second, following "Rencontre" with Damso. "Melodrama" earned gold certification in France within a month and diamond status two months later, setting a 2025 record for the longest consecutive run at No. 1 in the country, while also earning platinum certification in Belgium and a nomination for Song of the Year at Les Flammes in 2026.

Theodora in 2026

Toward the end of September 2025, she and her mixtape Bad Boy Lovestory were awarded the 18–20 prize by the Prix Joséphine des artistes, organized with Télérama, Crédit Mutuel, and the National Center of Music, and judged by thirteen young music enthusiasts. She also appeared on Sarz's "Mademoiselle", taken from his album Protect Sarz at All Costs, alongside Odumodublvck, Shallipopi, and Zeina. The song peaked at No. 19 on the UK Afrobeats Singles Chart and No. 29 on the Billboard U.S. Afrobeats Songs. She then appeared at the GP Explorer 3 concert on 4 October 2025 and appeared on its companion album The Last Race. In November 2025, GQ France named her Woman of the Year, and later appeared on Meryl's "Instructions" from her album La Dame, which reached No. 43 on the SNEP Top Singles chart. By December 2025, she had become the most-streamed French-language artist in France.

In January 2026, she appeared on Gims' single "Spa", which reached No. 4 on the SNEP Top Singles chart for three weeks, No. 18 on Ultratop Wallonia, and No. 21 on the Swiss Hitparade. The following month, she released "Des mythos", which peaked at No. 13 on the SNEP chart. That same month, on 13 February, she won four awards at the 41st Victoires de la Musique, the most of any artist that year. On 19 February, she announced Sexy Music 4 Life, a new project scheduled for release in early summer 2026, and the following day featured on PLK's "Sex Model" from his album Grand Garçon, which peaked at No. 3. On 12 March, she released "Miss Kitoko", which reached No. 12. In April, she was announced as the first French ambassador for Mugler's Angel Nova fragrance. On 23 April, she won five awards at the fourth Les Flammes ceremony, including Female Artist of the Year and Album of the Year. On 2 May, she joined Fally Ipupa during his first concert at the Stade de France, performing "Kongolese sous BBL" and joining him for "Mayday".

== Television career ==
Between 31 October and 14 November 2025, Theodora appeared as a guest on the fourth season of Nouvelle École, a Netflix-produced musical reality series centered on French-speaking European rap (from France, Belgium, and Switzerland) and adapted from the American show Rhythm + Flow. In January 2026, she became a permanent member of the judging panel for the program's fifth season, alongside Oli and SDM.

== Style and influences ==
Theodora on stage in Nyon, Switzerland.

Theodora's style has been described as a mix of goth, rap, and R&B influences. Her brother, Jeez Suave, serves as her main producer. Together they have incorporated elements of drum and bass, Creole folk music, Caribbean genres such as bouyon, and influences from her childhood spent in Greece, the Democratic Republic of the Congo, and Réunion. In an interview with Vogue France, she credited her father, a music enthusiast, with introducing her to local styles during their travels. She has also cited The Weeknd and Rihanna as influences.

== Activism ==
=== Feminism, anti–far-right engagement, and denunciation of genocides ===
On social media, she openly shares her opinions on societal matters, particularly her support for feminism. In July 2024, after the National Rally's performance in the first round of the legislative elections, she joined other artists at a demonstration opposing the far right. She has also spoken out against genocides, especially those occurring in the Democratic Republic of the Congo and Gaza. On 22 April 2025, she appeared at the sold-out Solidarité Congo benefit concert at the Accor Arena, joining dozens of French rap and international artists to gather support for children affected by the Rwandan-backed M23 insurgency in eastern DRC. The concert's revenue was entirely donated to Give Back Charity. In September 2025, during the Fête de l'Humanité, she performed in a "Free Congo" top to denounce the ongoing M23 campaign.

She actively positions herself against far-right ideology, even stating that she is proud not to "have any fascists" attending her concerts. Commentators have portrayed her as a symbolic antidote to rising reactionary politics, suggesting that her aesthetic, embodiment, and outspoken messages offer a sense of relief in a period perceived as socially regressive. In December 2025, she called out Jordan Bardella for using melodramatic rhetoric on social media, pointing out what she saw as hypocrisy: "I cannot understand how you, who never consider me fully French, can profit from my work to defend positions that I fight against and with which I have never wanted to be associated". She reiterated her stance against the far right by referencing Zaho de Sagazan, stressing that politicians should not quote artists if they fail to defend the people those artists stand for.

=== LGBTQIA+ advocacy ===
During her 2025 appearance on Drag Race France All Stars, she expressed her appreciation for drag culture and the LGBTQIA+ community, acknowledging how much she has gained from them and her desire to give back. According to Steffanee Wang in the Fader, her song "Mon Bébé" stands out as boldly provocative and rich in queer-coded visuals. Theodora performs on stage in lingerie, bikinis, corsets, and creatively draped fabrics that strategically cover only what censorship requires.

In an interview with Billboard France in December 2025, she added that the drag world had helped her through difficult periods in her life, stating, "It's a world I really appreciated, at a time in my life when I was withdrawing into myself without realizing it. I met people who were really there to express themselves and come together. I think some of them felt this almost paternal need to come and help me. That's why I feel close to it, and I also have many LGBT people on my team".

=== Addressing racism in France ===
Speaking to the Fader in November 2025, Theodora discussed systemic racism in France, noting that Black women in the music industry must exert significantly more effort to succeed. She said she intentionally wears her natural afro-textured hair, aware that her visibility can shape how young Black girls see themselves. She also described feeling pressure to adopt a more formal French tone during radio interviews and to navigate media questions that included subtle microaggressions or reductive comparisons to the small pool of Black French female artists.

Over the past decade, France has seen only one dark-skinned Black woman achieve major superstardom: Aya Nakamura, who continues to endure significant racism. When Nakamura was announced as a performer at the 2024 Summer Olympics opening ceremony, a far-right group protested with a racist banner that read: "No way, Aya, this is Paris, not the Bamako market". Theodora's lyrics resonate with themes Yseult previously articulated in 2021 about exclusion, overperformance, and being reduced to one's skin color.

=== Women in the music industry ===
In an interview with Red Bull France, she described the music industry as hostile toward women, overly competitive, and structured to foster insecurity. She argued that women are made to believe there is limited space for them, even though many are talented. While she does not oppose competition itself, she believes it should not prevent solidarity or mutual respect among artists.

Speaking to Billboard France, she also criticized the industry as fundamentally anti-woman, saying it favors compliant "doll-like" figures rather than women who assert themselves and demand what they deserve. In her view, capitalism frames women as liabilities, particularly due to issues like maternity leave, and this logic extends into music, where she feels there is perceived to be room for only one successful woman at a time.

== Personal life ==
In 2024, Theodora dated rapper Zoomy. In a June 2025 interview, she spoke about her bisexuality, saying, "Actually, I've never come out. If I consider sexuality to be something normal, then I talk about it normally. No need for an announcement". She also revealed that she has polyendocrine metabolic ovarian syndrome (PMOS), which leads to hormonal and physical issues.

=== Origins of the "Boss Lady" persona ===
During Lili aux paradis artificiels: tome 2 recording sessions, Theodora began using the nickname "Boss Lady". In an interview with Abcdr du son, she explained that she had often jokingly referred to herself as a "boss girl", but the nickname became more meaningful during a session with rapper Implaccable while she was seriously ill. According to Theodora, Implaccable jokingly asked her how a "boss girl" could be sick, which motivated her to continue recording and ultimately inspired the track "Boss Lady". She later explained that the song reflected her personality and desire to move beyond the public image of "the sexy girl" or "the girl with the pink wig who looks like a cartoon character". In a separate interview with GQ France, she stated that she wanted to fully embrace the image of a "Boss Lady Bimbo".

== Discography ==
=== EPs ===
- Neptune (2021)
- Lili aux paradis artificiels (2023)
- Tome 2 (2023)

=== Mixtapes ===
Title	Album details	Peak chart positions			Certifications
Title	Album details	FRA	BEL (WA)	SWI	Certifications
Bad Boy Lovestory	Released: 1 November 2024; Labels: Boss Lady, Maison Neptune X NBFD	3	14	—	SNEP: 3× Platinum
Méga BBL (deluxe)	Released: 29 May 2025; Labels: Boss Lady, Virgin Music France, Universal Music France	2	15	21	SNEP: 3× Platinum

=== Singles and charted songs ===
Title	Year	Peak chart positions						Certifications	Album
Title	Year	FRA	BEL (WA)	NGA	SWI	UK Afro.	US Afro.	Certifications	Album
"Habiba" (Note: "Habiba" charted in 2026.)	2021	—	43	—	19	—	—		Neptune
"Kongolese sous BBL"	2024	10	34	—	—	—	—	SNEP: Diamond; BEA: Gold	Bad Boy Lovestory
"243 km/h"	2024	—	—	—	—	—	—	SNEP: Gold	Bad Boy Lovestory
"Ils me rient tous au nez"	2024	26	49	—	—	—	—	SNEP: Platinum	Bad Boy Lovestory
"Fashion Designa"	2024	12	37	—	—	—	—	SNEP: Diamond; BEA: Gold	Méga BBL
"Pay!" (featuring Guy2bezbar)	2025	31	—	—	—	—	—	SNEP: Platinum	Méga BBL
"Do U Wanna?"	2025	53	—	—	—	—	—	SNEP: Gold; BEA: Gold	Méga BBL
"Zou Bizou" (featuring Jul)	2025	9	31	—	—	—	—	SNEP: Diamond; BEA: Platinum	Méga BBL
"Masoko Na Mabele" (featuring London)	2025	122	—	—	—	—	—	SNEP: Platinum	Méga BBL
"Mon bébé" (featuring Brazy)	2025	30	—	—	—	—	—	SNEP: Platinum; BEA: Gold	Méga BBL
"Melodrama" (Disiz featuring Theodora)	2025	1	1	—	9	—	—	SNEP: Diamond; BEA: Platinum	On s'en rappellera pas
"Mademoiselle" (Sarz featuring Odumodublvck, Shallipopi, Theodora, Zeina)	2025	—	—	47	—	19	29		Protect Sarz at All Costs
"Dis moi je t'aime" (featuring GP Explorer)	2025	48	—	—	—	—	—		The Last Race
"Instructions" (Meryl featuring Theodora)	2025	43	—	—	—	—	—	SNEP: Gold	La Dame
"Spa" (Gims featuring Theodora)	2026	4	18	—	—	—	—	SNEP: Diamond	Non-album singles
"Des mythos"	2026	13	—	—	—	—	—	SNEP: Gold	Non-album singles
"Sex Model" (PLK featuring Theodora)	2026	3	—	—	40	—	—	SNEP: Gold	Grand garçon
"Miss Kitoko"	2026	12	—	—	—	—	—	SNEP: Platinum	Non-album single
"Ms Paper" (Ayra Starr featuring Thedora)	2026	—	—	66	—	—	—		Starr Girl
"La Nocturne" (Tiakola featuring Thedora)	2026	2	44	—	35	—	—		WpointM
"Pa' Touch" (A Colors Show) (Ino Casablanca)	2026	94	—	—	—	—	—		EXTASIAAAAA

== Awards and nominations ==
Year	Event	Prize	Recipient	Result	Ref.
2025	Les Flammes	Flame for Female Revelation of the Year	Herself	Won	
2025	Prix Joséphine	Price for 18–20 year olds	Bad Boy Lovestory	Won	
2025	NRJ Music Awards	Francophone Female Artist of the Year	Herself	Nominated	
2025	NRJ Music Awards	Social Hit	"Fashion Designa"	Nominated	
2025	GQ Men of the Year (France)	Woman of the Year	Herself	Won	
2025	Dazed 100	Music	Herself	Included	
2026	Victoires de la Musique	Victory for the Revelation Scene	Herself	Won	
2026	Victoires de la Musique	Female Révélation of the Year	Herself	Won	
2026	Victoires de la Musique	Album of the Year	Méga BBL	Won	
2026	Victoires de la Musique	Original Song	"Fashion Designa"	Nominated	
2026	Victoires de la Musique	Best Audiovisual Creation	"Fashion Designa"	Won	
2026	Les Flammes	Spotify Flame for Album of the Year	Méga BBL	Won	
2026	Les Flammes	Flame for Best New Pop Album	Méga BBL	Won	
2026	Les Flammes	Flame for Song of the Year	"Melodrama"	Nominated	
2026	Les Flammes	Flame for European and/or International Collaboration of the Year	"Mon bébé" ft. Brazy	Nominated	
2026	Les Flammes	Flame for Female Artist of the Year	Herself	Won	
2026	Les Flammes	Flame for Music Video of the Year	"Fashion Designa"	Won	
2026	Les Flammes	Flame for Album Cover of the Year	Méga BBL	Won	
