= Rencontre (song) =

2022 single by Disiz featuring Damso

Single by Disiz featuring Damso

from the album L'amour
- Released: 17 March 2022
- Recorded: 2022
- Length: 3:10
- Label: Lucidream
- Songwriters: Disiz; Damso

Disiz singles chronology
"Splash" (2017)	"Rencontre" (2022)

Damso singles chronology
"Dégaine" (2022)	"Rencontre" (2022)

Music video
- "Rencontre" on YouTube

"Rencontre" is a song by French-Senegalese singer Disiz featuring Belgian rapper Damso. It was released on 17 March 2022. It debuted atop the French charts.

== Charts ==
Chart performance for "Rencontre"
Chart (2022)	Peak position
Belgium (Ultratop 50 Wallonia)	11
France (SNEP)	1

== Certifications ==
Certifications for "Rencontre"
Region	Certification	Certified units/sales
Belgium (BRMA)	Gold	20,000^{‡}
France (SNEP)	Diamond	333,333^{‡}
^{‡} Sales+streaming figures based on certification alone.
