= Ultratop 50 Singles (Wallonia) =

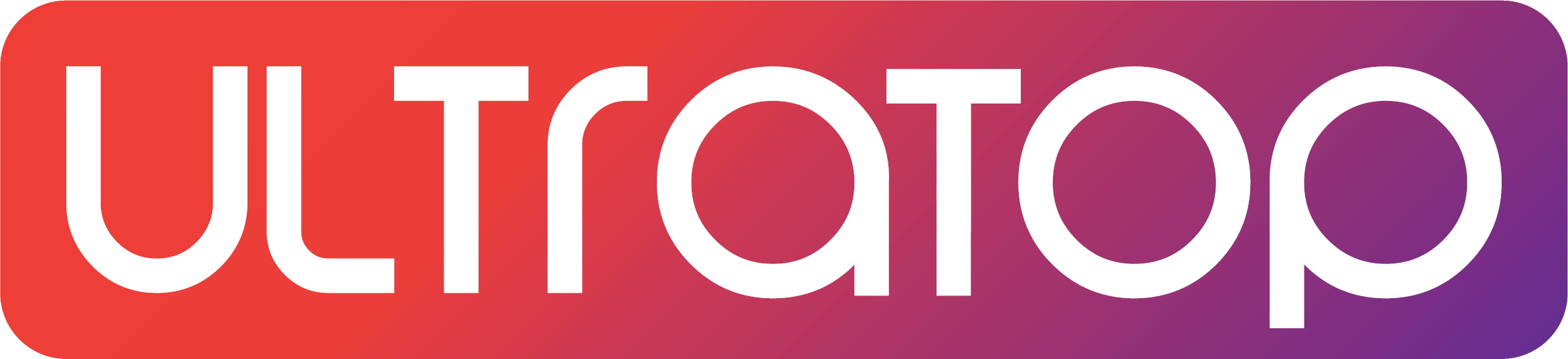
Ultratop logo since 2022

Ultratop 50 Singles is the chart of the best-selling singles in Wallonia. The Ultratop has existed since 31 March 1995. The Flemish counterpart of this chart is called the Flemish Ultratop 50. Until 4 September 2010, the chart consisted of 40 records and was called the Ultratop 40. There are twelve different charts under the Walloon Ultratop.

The Ultratop 50 Singles list is broadcast on Bel RTL on Saturdays between 12 and 2 pm.

== Compound ==
Both the Walloon Ultratop 50 and the Flemish Ultratop 50 were compiled purely based on sales data. Airplaywas initially not included. This data is collected by the international market research agency Nielsen. Every Saturday (or Sunday), the number of copies sold per single is collected from a representative number of stores. To prevent fraud, this data is processed using an anti-fraud procedure. If companies, artists, or consumers deliberately attempt to manipulate the charts, this is corrected. For each list, the sales data from the past two weeks is calculated. This prevents major fluctuations in the chart. All Ultratop charts are announced on Wednesdays and appear on the website on Thursdays. The broadcast is on Saturdays.

== Examples of records ==
- Las Ketchup's "The Ketchup Song" spent the longest time at number one, at 17 weeks. Hello by Adele stayed at number one for 16 weeks.
- Alors On Danse by Stromae was the song that stayed on the charts the longest, at 87 weeks. Adele's "Rolling in the Deep" stayed on the charts for 73 weeks.
- The Champions' "We Are the Best" was the shortest-lived number one hit, lasting six weeks. The song spent three weeks at number one.
- From not charting to straight to number 1 include: Elton John with Something About the Way You Look Tonight / Candle in the wind 1997, Star Academy with La musique (Angelica), Mario Barravecchia with On se ressemble, Grégoire with Toi + Moi, The Champions met We Are The Best, Britney Spears with Hold It Against Me and Adele with Rolling in the Deep.
- Made a re-entry to number 1: Tom Dice with Me and my Guitar
- The biggest climber to number one was Mylène Farmer with Dégénération, going from 33 to 1.
- Somebody That I Used to Know by Gotye and Kimbra is the slowest climber to number one, taking 36 weeks to reach the top of the chart.

== Best-selling singles per year ==
- 1995: Céline Dion – Pour que tu m'aimes encore
- 1996: Fugees – Killing Me Softly
- 1997: Elton John – Something About the Way You Look Tonight / Candle in the Wind 1997
- 1998: Daniel Lavoie, Patrick Fiori & Garou – Belle
- 1999: Britney Spears – ...Baby One More Time
- 2000: Yannick – Ces soirées là
- 2001: Daddy DJ – Daddy DJ
- 2002: Las Ketchup – The Ketchup Song
- 2003: Alphonse Brown – Le frunkp
- 2004: O-Zone – Dragostea din tei
- 2005: Crazy Frog – Axel F
- 2006: Shakira feat. Wyclef Jean – Hips Don't Lie
- 2007: Mika – Grace Kelly
- 2008: Fatal Bazooka feat. Yelle – Parle à ma main
- 2009: Lady Gaga – Poker Face
- 2010: Shakira feat. Freshlyground – Waka Waka (This Time for Africa)
- 2011: Adele – Rolling in the Deep
- 2012: Gotye feat. Kimbra – Somebody That I Used to Know
- 2013: Stromae – Papaoutai
- 2014: Pharrell Williams – Happy
- 2015: Omi – Cheerleader (Felix Jaehn remix)
- 2016: Sia feat. Sean Paul – Cheap Thrills
- 2017: Ed Sheeran – Shape of You
- 2018: Maître Gims met Vianney – La même
- 2019: Lil Nas X – Old Town Road
- 2020: The Weeknd – Blinding Lights
- 2021: The Weeknd – Save Your Tears
- 2022: Harry Styles – As It Was
- 2023: Miley Cyrus – Flowers
- 2024: Benson Boone – Beautiful Things
- 2025: Gims – "Ciel"
