= Melodrama (Disiz and Theodora song) =

2025 single by Disiz and Theodora

Single by Disiz and Theodora

from the album On s'en rappellera pas
- Released: 26 September 2025
- Genre: French pop
- Length: 2:56
- Label: Production Carré Bleu
- Songwriters: Disiz; Theodora
- Producers: Disiz; Max Baby; Emmanuel Camy; Neon Valley

"Melodrama" (stylized in all lowercase) is a song by French singers Disiz and Theodora. It was written by the aformentioned singers, with production handled by Disiz, Max Baby, Emmanuel Camy and Neon Valley. The track was released on 26 September 2025 as the lead single from Disiz's studio album On s'en rappellera pas.

"Melodrama" climbed to the top of the SNEP chart for several consecutive weeks. It was certified gold in France less than a month later and diamond two months later. This track held the record for the most consecutive weeks spent at number one on the French charts in 2025.

In February 2026, "Melodrama" became the longest-running French-language hit in France. It broke the record held by the hits "Belle" and "Petit génie". The song also holds the record in Belgium, having spent 16 consecutive weeks at number one, making it the longest-running French-language hit in the charts.

== Lyrics ==
"Melodrama" explores the theme of wounded love, frustration, painful memories and misunderstanding in a complex love relationship.

Disiz deploys a melodic pop musical style, while Theodora brings a vocal touch that reinforces this "dramatic and vulnerable" atmosphere. The lyrics, in the form of a dialogue between the two artists, recount the pain and confusion of a relationship where attraction coexists with disillusionment, symbolized by the repeated reference to the sound "that you wouldn't have Shazam", a metaphor for something precious but elusive.

== Composition ==
"Melodrama" is distinguished by a sophisticated and organic production with a reworked synthpop sound, imbued with 80s influences, created by a trio of producers including Neon Valley, Emmanuel Camy and Max Baby. The track is composed in G sharp with a tempo of 154 beats per minute.

== Charts ==
=== Weekly charts ===
Weekly chart performance
Chart (2025–2026)	Peak position
Belgium (Ultratop 50 Wallonia)	1
CIS Airplay (TopHit)	38
France (SNEP)	1
Kazakhstan Airplay (TopHit)	25
Lithuania Airplay (TopHit)	156
Luxembourg (Billboard)	9
Moldova Airplay (TopHit)	154
Russia Airplay (TopHit)	29
Switzerland (Schweizer Hitparade)	8

=== Monthly charts ===
Monthly chart performance
Chart (2026)	Peak position
CIS Airplay (TopHit)	43
Kazakhstan Airplay (TopHit)	25
Russia Airplay (TopHit)	34

== Certifications ==
Certifications
Region	Certification	Certified units/sales
Belgium (BRMA)	Platinum	40,000^{‡}
France (SNEP)	Diamond	333,333^{‡}
Switzerland (IFPI Switzerland)	Platinum	30,000^{‡}
^{‡} Sales+streaming figures based on certification alone.
