= Guy2Bezbar =

Musical artist (born 1997)

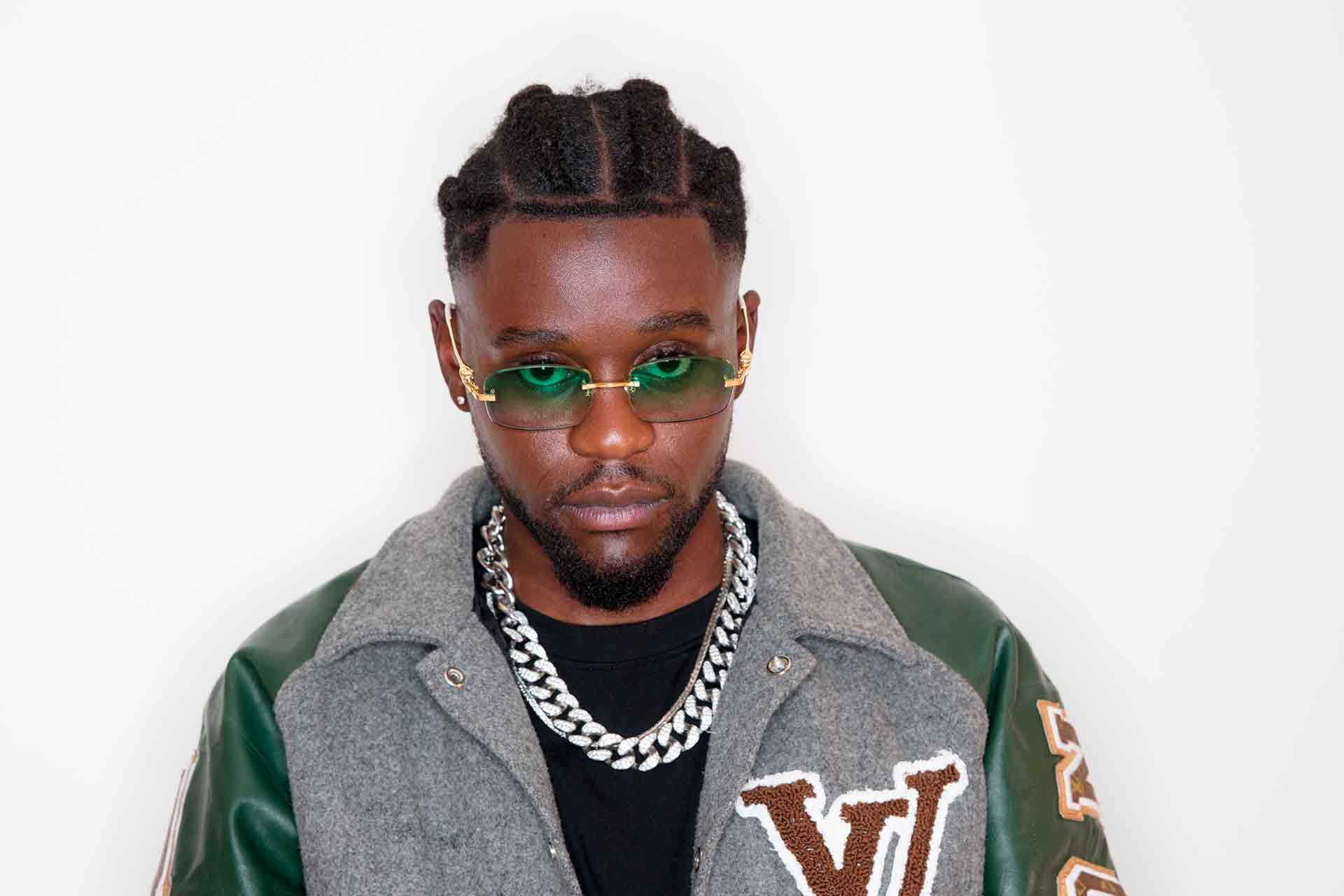
- Guy-Fernand Kapata

Background information
- Born: Guy-Fernand Kapata; 3 December 1997 (age 28); Paris, France
- Genres: Hip hop, Trap, Drill
- Occupation: Rapper
- Years active: 2015–present
- Label: Blue Magic Corp

Guy2Bezbar, whose real name is Guy-Fernand Kapata (born 3 December 1997 in Paris), is a French rapper of Congolese descent.

== Biography ==
Guy-Fernand Kapata was born and raised in the 18th arrondissement of Paris, into a family of Congolese origin.

== Career ==
He released his first mixtape, Mixtape in 2015, while in the following two years volumes 1 and 2 of his Jungle mixtape were released. In parallel, he dedicated himself to football, attempting a trial with English team West Ham United, despite not getting the job. Instead he joined Paris FC and later Red Star.

On November 19, 2021, he returned to the music scene with his first studio album, called Coco Jojo. It consisted of 18 tracks and featured artists such as Hamza, Zkr, Tayc and Mayo. The following year he began a collaboration with rapper Leto, which resulted in the release of the joint album Jusqu'aux étoiles on November 11th. The album's release was followed a few months later by a concert at the Olympia in Paris.

On November 17, 2023 he released his third album Ambition, containing 16 tracks and featuring SDM, Jey Brownie, Josman, Koba LaD and Franglish. A new version of the album, called Ambition II, was made available at the beginning of 2024, and saw the addition of 12 unreleased titles, with features from Rsko, Fally Ipupa and Dinos.

And on 3 October 2025 HE released his album titled JEUNESSE DORÉE which features artists like Joé Dwèt Filé,Aya Nakamura, and many more

== Discography ==
=== Studio albums ===
- Coco Jojo (2021)
- Jusqu'aux étoiles (with Leto) (2022)
- Ambition (2023)

=== Mixtapes ===
- Mixtape (2015)
- Jungle vol. 1 (2016)
- Jungle vol. 2 (2017)

=== EPs ===
- Maison blanche (2024)
