= Werenoi =

French rapper (1994–2025)

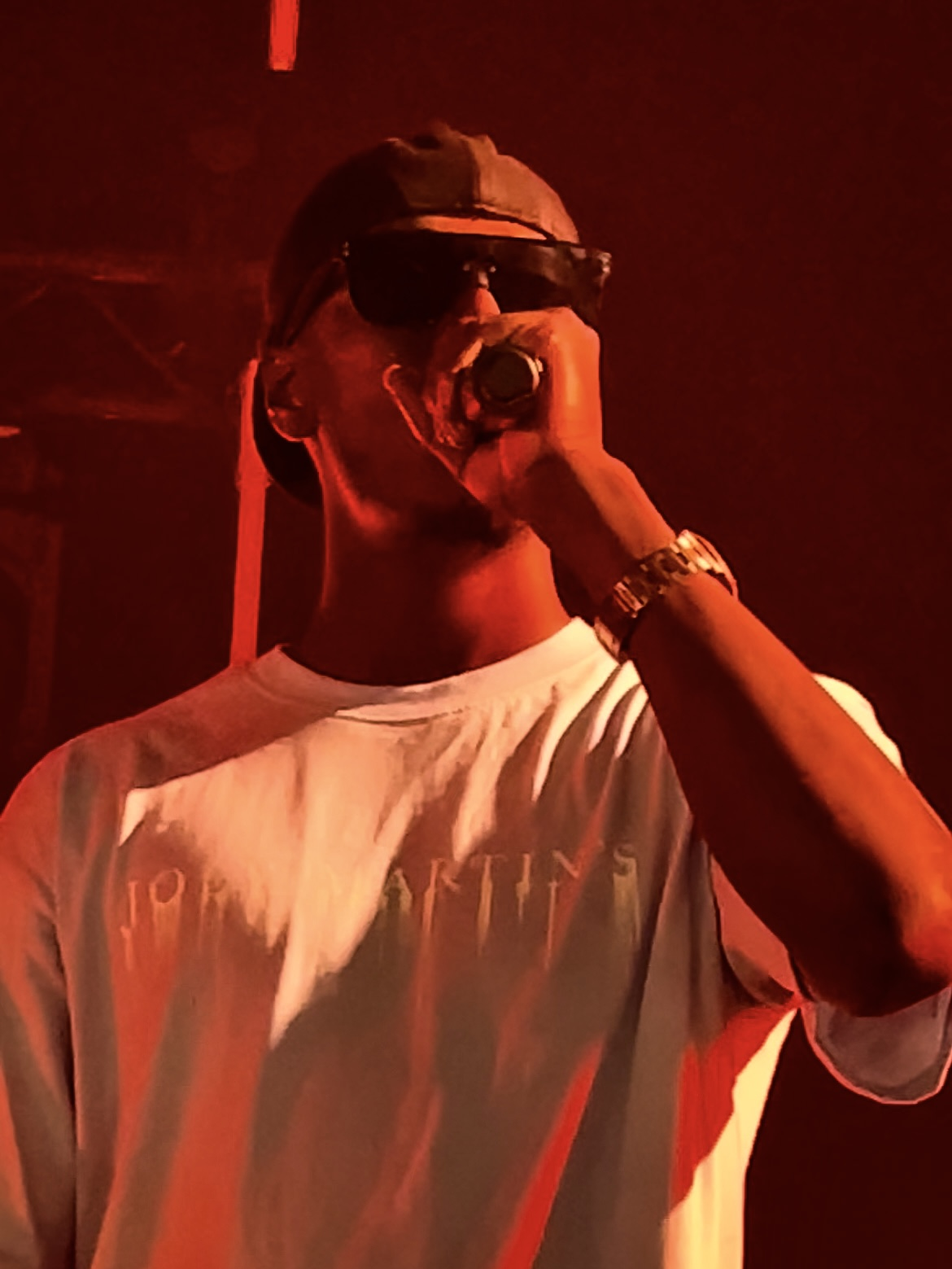
- Werenoi in the Montreux Jazz Festival, 2023

Background information
- Born: Jérémy Bana Owona; 30 January 1994; Melun, France
- Died: 17 May 2025 (aged 31) Paris, France
- Genres: Hip hop
- Occupation: Rapper
- Years active: 2021–2025
- Labels: PLR Music, PGP Records, AllPoints

Jérémy Bana Owona (French pronunciation: [ʒeʁemi bana owɔna]; 30 January 1994 – 17 May 2025), known professionally as Werenoi (pronounced [weʁənwa]), was a French rapper. He was voted the male revelation of the year at the Les Flammes ceremony in 2023. Werenoi held the number 1 position in album sales in France in 2023 and 2024. He released four studio albums and two EPs.

== Early and personal life ==
Jérémy Bana Owona was born on 30 January 1994 in Melun. Little was known about Owona's personal life, due to his desire to keep his personal life and his family matters private. He grew up in Montreuil in a family of Cameroonian origin. He was related to the rapper Zequin. He was a Muslim. He had 3 children.

== Musical career ==
Werenoi released his first song, "Guadalajara", in February 2021, under the name We Renoi. During the year he released several other singles, including "Señor de los Gallos", featuring Lacrim. In May 2022 Werenoi signed a contract with label AllPoints France, announcing the release of his first official project, Telegram, a 12-track EP released on 3 June of the same year. It was then re-released a few months later with two additional tracks, one of which was created together with rapper Ninho. Telegram was certified gold, whereas the song "Solitaire", featured on it, obtained the diamond certification.

On 23 February 2023, Werenoi released the freestyle "10.03.2023", in reference to the release date of his first studio album, titled Carré. The album featured rappers PLK, Ninho, Tiakola, and Lacrim, and achieved good success, selling more than 18,000 copies in the first week. Carré turned out to be the best-selling album in France in 2023, ahead of projects by notable artists such as Hamza and Ninho. On 22 September 2023, Werenoi released a new project, the EP Telegram 2, announced the day before its release. He was voted the male revelation of the year at the Les Flammes ceremony in 2023. Werenoi held the number 1 position in album sales in France in 2023 and 2024.

His second album, Pyramide, was released on 16 February 2024. In May 2024, his album Carré received the “Rap Album of the Year” award at the Les Flammes ceremony. On 17 October 2024 Werenoi performed at the Accor Arena in Paris.

Werenoi released the second opus of the project, Pyramide 2, on 18 October 2024. Carried by the single "Pétunias" released two weeks earlier, this 14-track extension includes two features: with Gazo on "La famine" and PLK on "En pétard". In November 2024, his label announced the release of his new album for April 2025. Lil Tjay was announced as one of the collaborators. On 24 March 2025, he announced the release of Diamant noir for 11 April 2025. Other guests include Damso & Ninho, Dystinct, SDM & Vacra, Gunna, and Kalash. In 2025, Werenoi received the award for "Best Album" for Pyramide 2 at the 2025 Les Flammes ceremony.

== Death ==
On the 17th of May, 2025, Owona was rushed to the Pitié-Salpêtrière hospital in Paris, and was reported to be in critical condition. The day before, Owona missed a scheduled appearance, and on the day of his hospitalisation, he was scheduled to perform at a concert in Lyon, which he also did not attend. Following these missed events, public concerns about Owona's whereabouts began to grow, however, his situation was kept strictly private. Later on in the day, Owona would be pronounced dead, at the age of 31, with his cause of death widely being reported as a cardio-respiratory arrest, however, other sources would claim he suffered a fatal heart attack. The cause of his cardiac arrest, however, has not been fully confirmed. Reports of Owona's death being a result of hyperkalemia, due to undiagnosed type-1 diabetes, would quickly circulate, however, would not be confirmed. He was buried in Montreuil.

His record label, Believe, confirmed his death on Instagram. His producer, Babiry "Babs" Sacko, also posted on X, saying that "All our thoughts go out to his family, loved ones, team, and all those who knew him." "Rest in peace, my brother, I love you." A showcase scheduled for 16 May 2025, the day before Werenoi's death, was cancelled; he was also scheduled to perform on the day of his death. Many personalities paid tribute to Werenoi, including Aya Nakamura, Gims, Kaaris, Jul, SCH, Maes, Lacrim, Pascal Obispo, N.O.S., and the Minister of Culture Rachida Dati. Following the death of Werenoi, his producer Babs publicly condemned fake fundraisers appearing online.

In June 2025, a young woman claiming to be Werenoi's partner, filed a complaint against Werenoi's producer, Babiry "Babs" Sacko. A judicial investigation was subsequently opened for "aggravated theft" and "extortion." The young woman accused Sacko of assaulting her in a hookah bar a few days after the rapper's death and demanding of her a large sum of money, between 1 and 2 million euros. On June 24, 2025, Sacko and Werenoi's widow claimed a million euros were held by the young woman.

Werenoi had been scheduled to perform at Les Ardentes in Belgium on July 7, 2025.

After his death, the listening and sales of all his albums jumped in the SNEP rankings, for the period from May 16 to 22: 197% increase in one week for Pyramide 2, 223% for Carré and 5500% for Telegram. His latest album Diamant noir increased its sales by 72%, including 963% in physical format and 37% in streaming.

== Discography ==
=== Studio albums ===
- Carré (2023)
- Pyramide (2024)
- Pyramide 2 (2024)
- Diamant noir (2025)

=== EPs ===
- Telegram (2022)
- Telegram 2 (2023)
