= Ninao =

Single by Gims

from the EP Le Nord se souvient
- Language: French
- Released: 20 February 2025
- Genre: Pop
- Length: 2:47
- Label: Géante Rouge
- Composer: Maximum Beats
- Lyricist: Gims
- Producer: Maximum Beats

Music video
- "Ninao" on YouTube

"Ninao" is a song by Congolese singer Gims. Released on 20 February 2025, the song topped the French Singles Chart where he stayed for seven weeks. It also charts in Austria, Belgium, Germany, Luxembourg, Netherlands, and Switzerland. Further, Ninao's musical background traces back to the Adjara region of Georgia, taking much of its melody from traditional folk song "Gandagana".

== Charts ==
=== Weekly charts ===
Weekly chart performance for "Ninao"
Chart (2025)	Peak position
Austria (Ö3 Austria Top 40)	60
Belgium (Ultratop 50 Wallonia)	2
France (SNEP)	1
Germany (GfK)	81
Hungary (Single Top 40)	28
Luxembourg (Billboard)	5
Netherlands (Single Top 100)	63
Switzerland (Schweizer Hitparade)	7

=== Year-end charts ===
Year-end chart performance for "Ninao"
Chart (2025)	Position
Belgium (Ultratop 50 Flanders)	182
Belgium (Ultratop 50 Wallonia)	7
Hungary (Single Top 40)	90
Switzerland (Schweizer Hitparade)	24
