= Disiz =

French rapper

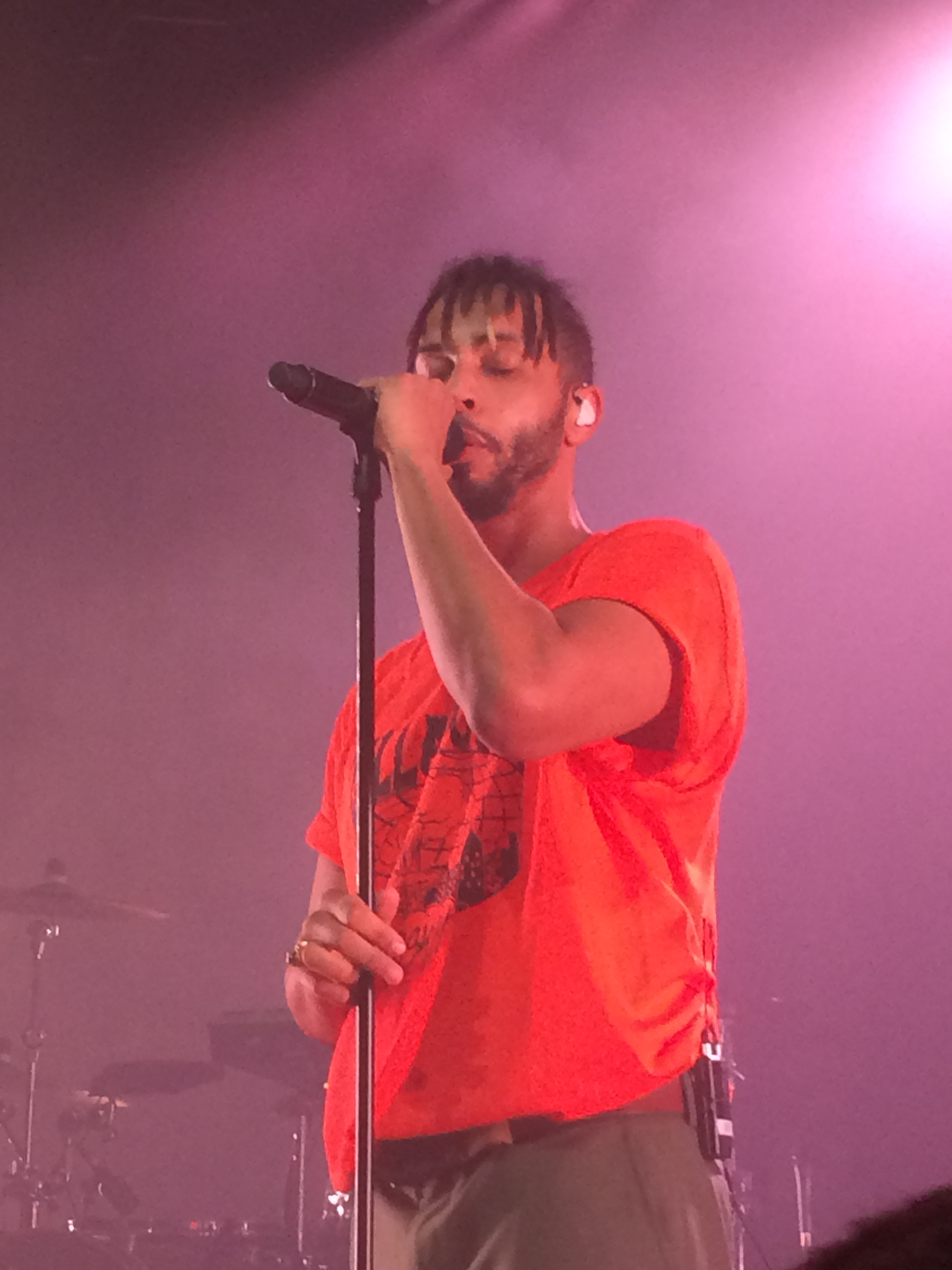
- French rapper Disiz in concert in Saint-Avé, France on 22 February 2019.

Background information
- Also known as: Disiz la Peste; Disiz Peter Punk; Disiz (since 2009)
- Born: Sérigne M'Baye Gueye; 22 March 1978 (age 48)
- Origin: Évry, Île-de-France, France
- Genre: Hip hop
- Occupations: Rapper, actor
- Years active: 1999–present
- Label: Lucidream

Sérigne M'Baye Gueye (French pronunciation: [seʁiɲ ɛmbaj ɡɛj]; born 28 March 1978), better known by his stage name Disiz (formerly Disiz la Peste, pronounced [disiz la pɛst]), is a French rapper and actor. Born to a Senegalese father and French mother, he grew up listening to hip hop music.

He was a great fan of the French rap groups NTM and IAM. He was discovered by JoeyStarr, one of the members of the famous rap group NTM after listening to a sample tape named Bête de bombe.

== Discography ==
=== Albums ===
Year	Album	Peak positions				Label
Year	Album	FRA	BEL (Fl)	BEL (Wa)	SWI	Label
2000	Le poisson rouge (Disiz la peste)	5	—	—	—	Barclay (Universal Music)
2003	Jeu de société (Disiz la peste)	31	—	—	—	Barclay (Universal Music)
2004	Itinéraire d'un enfant bronzé (Serigne M'Baye)	—	—	—	—	Barclay (Universal Music)
2006	Les histoires extra-ordinaires d'un jeune de banlieue (Disiz la peste)	30	—	—	—	Barclay (Universal Music)
2009	Disiz the End (Disiz)	45	—	74	—	Naïve
2010	Dans le ventre du crocodile (Disiz Peter Punk)	—	—	—	—	Naïve
2012	Lucide (Disiz)	21	—	—	—	Lucidream
2012	Extra-Lucide (Disiz)	6	—	18	—	Lucidream; Def Jam France (Universal Music)
2014	Transe-Lucide (Disiz)	14	191	12	58	Lucidream; Def Jam France (Universal Music)
2015	Rap Machine (Disiz)	12	—	26	—	Lucidream
2017	Pacifique (Disiz la peste)	8	—	38	49	Polydor
2018	Disizilla (Disiz la peste)	—	—	14	55	Polydor
2022	L'Amour (Disiz)	4	—	7	33	Capitol
2025	On s'en rappellera pas (Disiz)	2	—	15	20	Sony

=== Singles ===
Year	Title	Peak positions				Album
Year	Title	FRA	BEL (Wa)	BEL (Wa) Tip	SWI	Album
2000	"J'pète les plombs" (Disiz la peste)	6	4	–	33	Le Poisson rouge
2000	"Lettre ouverte" (One Shot presente Disiz La Peste & Jalane)	36	–	–	–	Taxi 2 (OST)
2000	"Le poisson rouge"	55	–	8	–	Le Poisson rouge
2001	"Ghetto Sitcom"	36	–	9	–	Le Poisson rouge
2001	"Volte face" (ft. Busta Flex)	80	–	–	–	Première Classe Vol. 2
2005	"Dans tes rêves"	37	–	14	–	Dans tes rêves (OST)
2005	"Métis(se)" (feat. Yannick Noah)	11	22	–	41	Métisse(s) (Yannick Noah)
2005	"Inspecteur Disiz"	43	–	9	–	Les histoires extraordinaires d'un jeune de banlieue
2006	"Jeune de banlieue"	44	–	18	–	Les histoires extraordinaires d'un jeune de banlieue
2009	"Bête de bombe 4" (Disiz)	–	–	–	–	Disiz The End
2010	"Dans le ventre du crocodile" (Disiz Peter Punk)	–	–	16	–	Dans le ventre du crocodile
2010	"Rien comme les autres"	–	–	32	–	Dans le ventre du crocodile
2012	"Moïse" (Disiz)	–	–	–	–	Lucide
2012	"Extra-Lucide"	120	–	42	–	Extra-lucide
2012	"Best Day" (feat. Autumn Rowe)	156	–	8	–	Extra-lucide
2013	"Le rap c mieux! (wesh !)"	120	–	–	–	
2013	"F**k les problèmes"	186	–	–	–	Transe-Lucide
2014	"Rap Genius"	73	–	–	–	Transe-Lucide
2014	"Burn Out (Sayonara)"	62	–	–	–	Transe-Lucide
2014	"Laisse béton"	115	–	–	–	La Bande à Renaud
2015	"Abuzeur"	157	–	–	–	Rap Machine
2017	"Autre espèce"	115	–	–	–	Pacifique
2017	"Splash"	193	–	–	–	Pacifique
2022	"Recontre" (feat. Damso)	1	11	–	–	L'Amour
2025	"Melodrama" (with Theodora)	1	1	–	8	Non-album single

== Acting career ==
=== Actor ===
- "Petits meurtres en famille" .... Éloi (4 episodes, 2006)

... aka A Family Murder Party (International: English title)

- Dans tes rêves (2005) (as Sérigne M'Baye) .... Ixe

... aka In Your Dreams (Australia: TV title)

- Chepor, La (2004) (as Sérigne Gueye) .... Franck

=== TV appearances ===
- "Salut les Terriens" (1 episode, 2006)
- Noirs (2006) (TV)
- "Tout le monde en parle" (3 episodes, 2005)
- Live 8 (2005) (TV)
- Chanson de l'année, La (2005) (TV)
- Tout le monde ELA (2005) (TV)
- "Taratata" (2 episodes, 2005)
- Podium (2005) (TV)
- "Matinale, La" (1 episode, 2005)
- "Comme au cinéma" .... Himself (1 episode, 2005)

... aka Comme au cinéma: l'émission (France: long new title)

- "20h10 pétantes" .... Himself (1 episode, 2005)

=== Radio Show ===
- "Planète Rap" on Skyrock (1 week, 2006)
- "Planète Rap" on Skyrock (1 week, 2009)
- "Planète Rap" on Skyrock (2 weeks, 2012)
- "Planète Rap" on Skyrock (1 week, 2013)
- "Planète Rap" on Skyrock (1 week, 2014)
