= Danse avec les stars season 14 =

Season of French television series

Danse avec les stars
- Season 14
- Celebrity winner: Lénie
- Professional winner: Jordan Mouillerac
- No. of episodes: 11

Release
- Original network: TF1
- Original release: 7 February – 25 April 2025

Season chronology
- ← Previous; Season 13 Next → Season 15

The fourteenth season of Danse avec les stars (the French version of Strictly Come Dancing) premiered in February 2025 on TF1, hosted by Camille Combal.

Things To Know Florent Manaudou already appears on the show in season 8 for cheering Camille Lacourt and sharing a few steps with Candice Pascal during a game

== Participants ==
Celebrity	Known for	Partner	Status
Nelson Monfort	Sports commentator	Calisson Goasdoué	Eliminated 1st on 21 February 2025
Sophie Davant	Journalist, TV and radio host	Nicolas Archambault	Eliminated 2nd on 28 February 2025
Charlotte de Turckheim	Actress, comedian and film director	Yann-Alrick Mortreuil	Eliminated 3rd on 14 March 2025
Frank Leboeuf	Former footballer, sports commentator & actor	Candice Pascal	Eliminated 4th on 21 March 2025
Ève Gilles	Miss France 2024	Nino Mosa	Eliminated 5th on 28 March 2025
Claude Dartois	Koh-Lanta participant	Katrina Patchett	Eliminated 6th on 4 April 2025
Julie Zenatti	Singer	Adrien Caby	Eliminated 7th on 11 April 2025
Jungeli	Singer	Inès Vandamme	Eliminated 8th & 9th on 18 April 2025
Mayane	Actress	Christophe Licata	Eliminated 8th & 9th on 18 April 2025
Adil Rami	Footballer	Ana Riera	Third Place on 25 April 2025
Florent Manaudou	Swimmer	Elsa Bois	Runners-up on 25 April 2025
Lénie	Singer	Jordan Mouillerac	Winners on 25 April 2025

Lénie

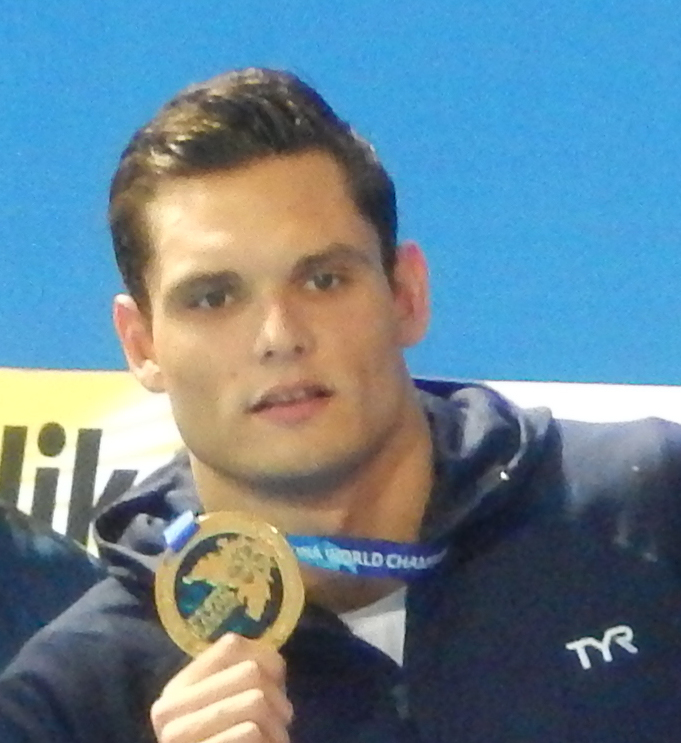
Florent Manaudou

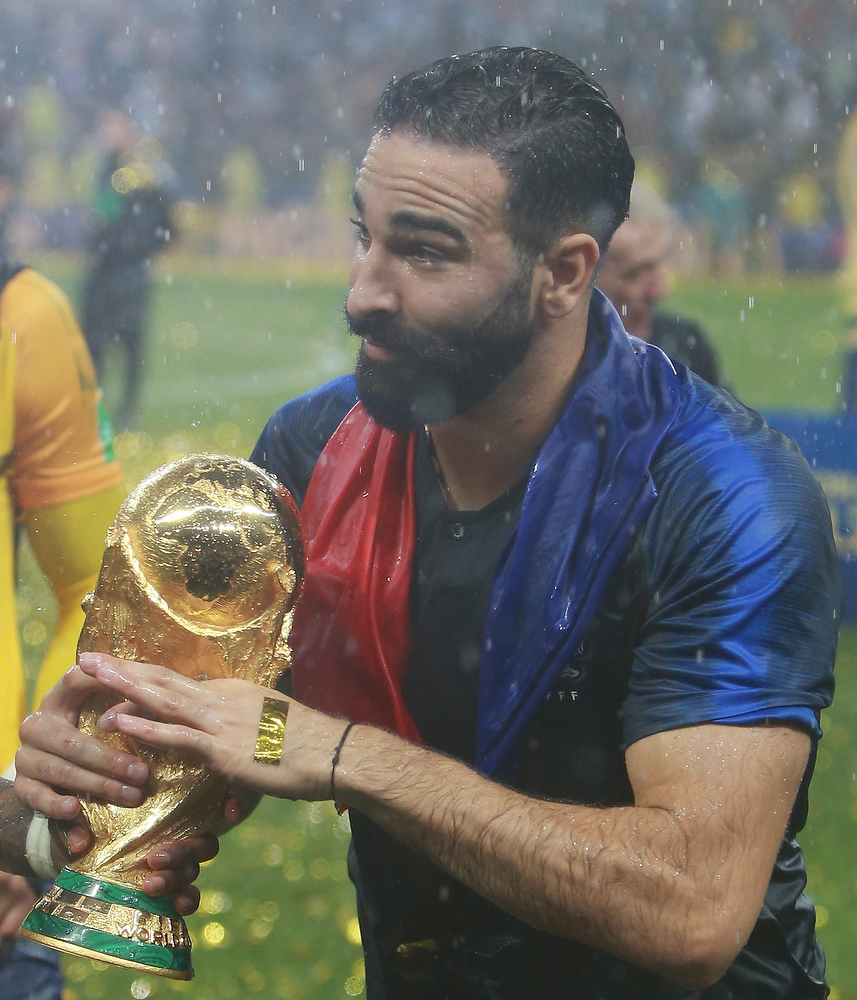
Adil Rami

Jungeli

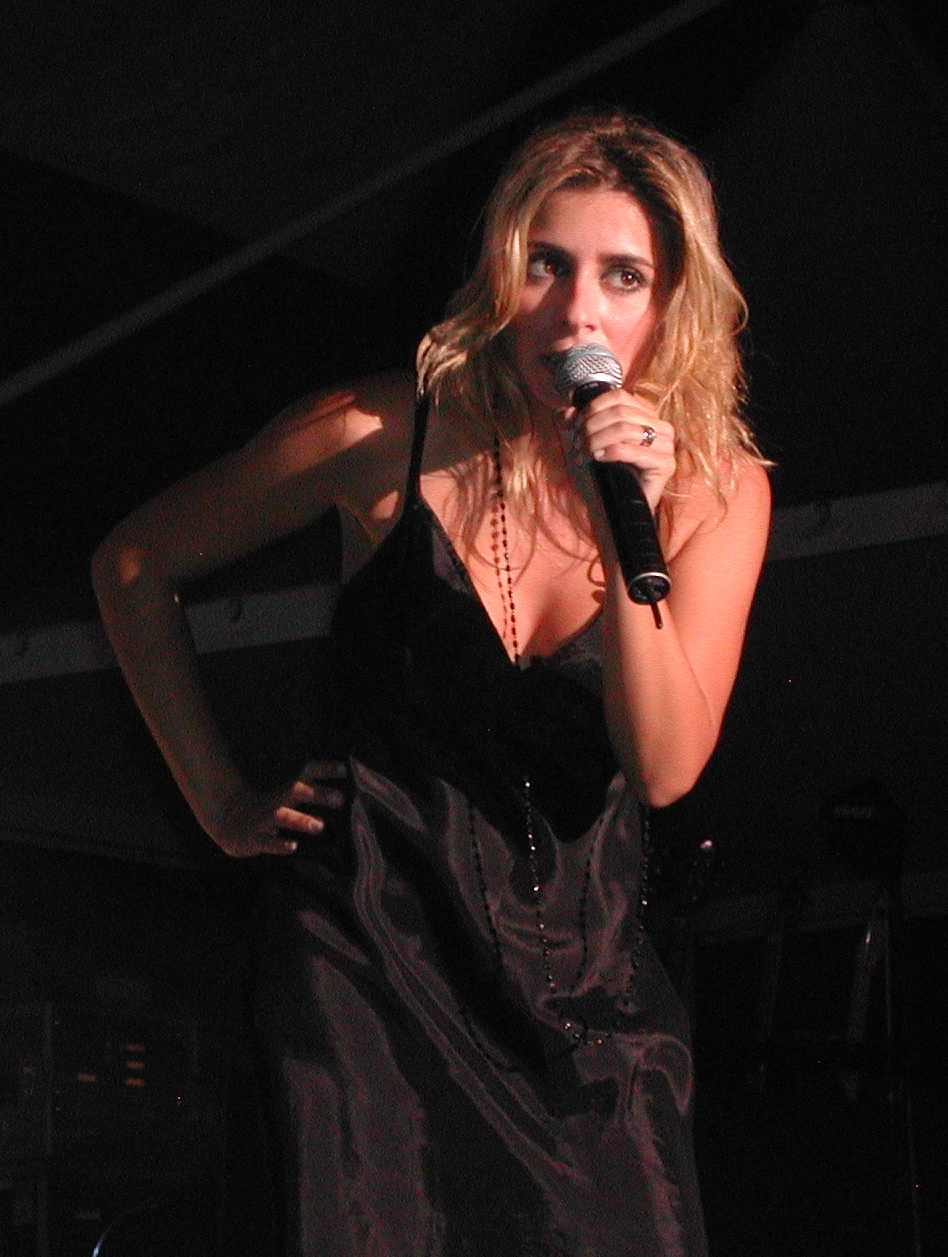
Julie Zenatti

Claude Dartois

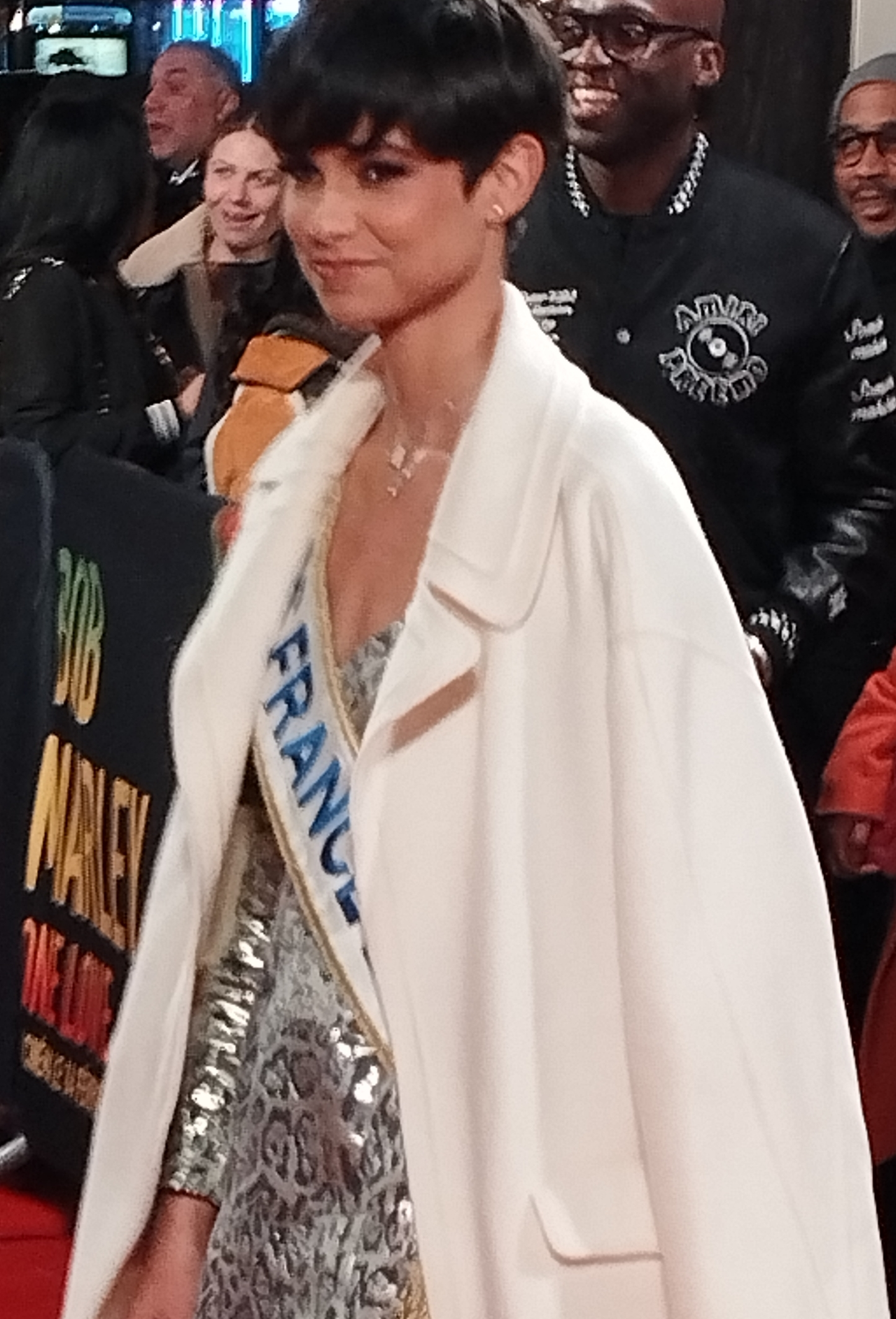
Ève Gilles

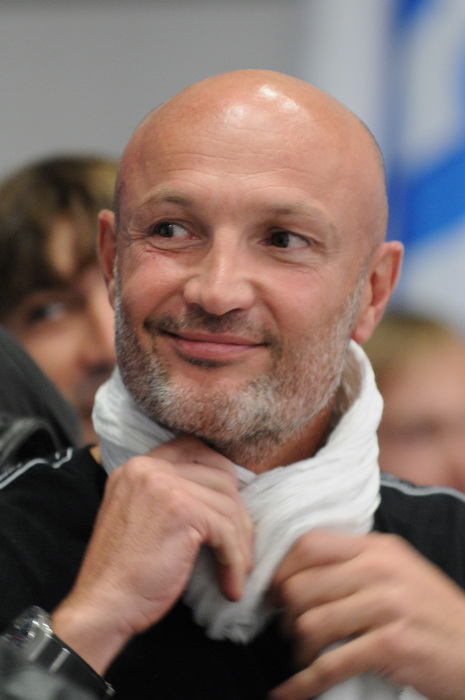
Frank Leboeuf

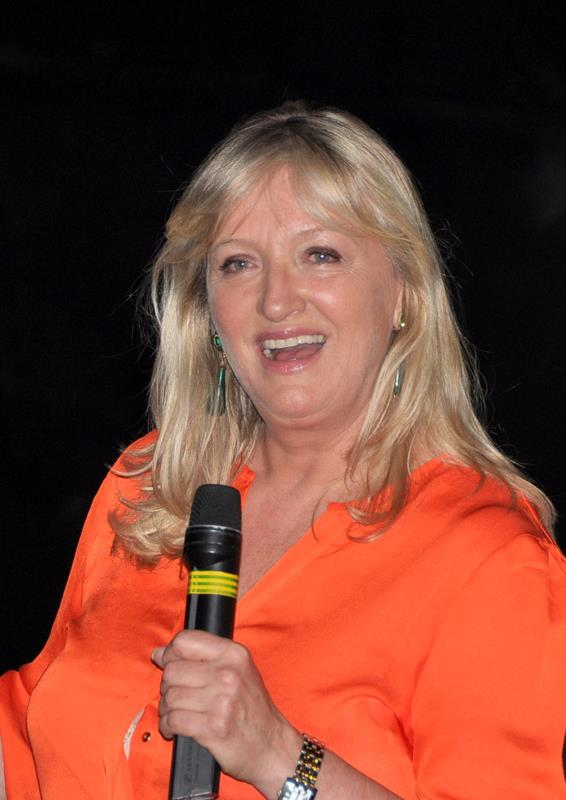
Charlotte de Turckheim

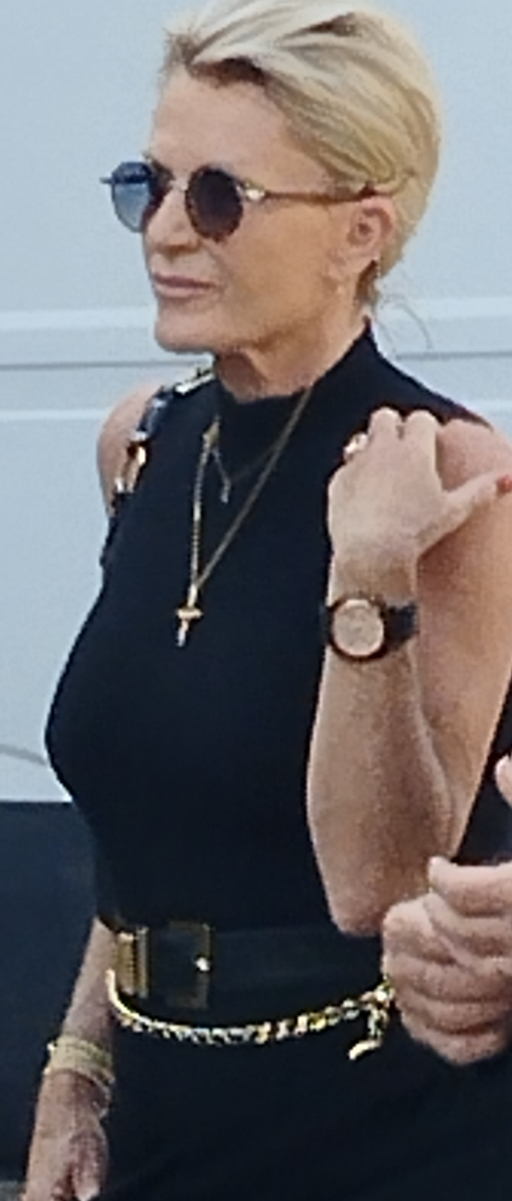
Sophie Davant

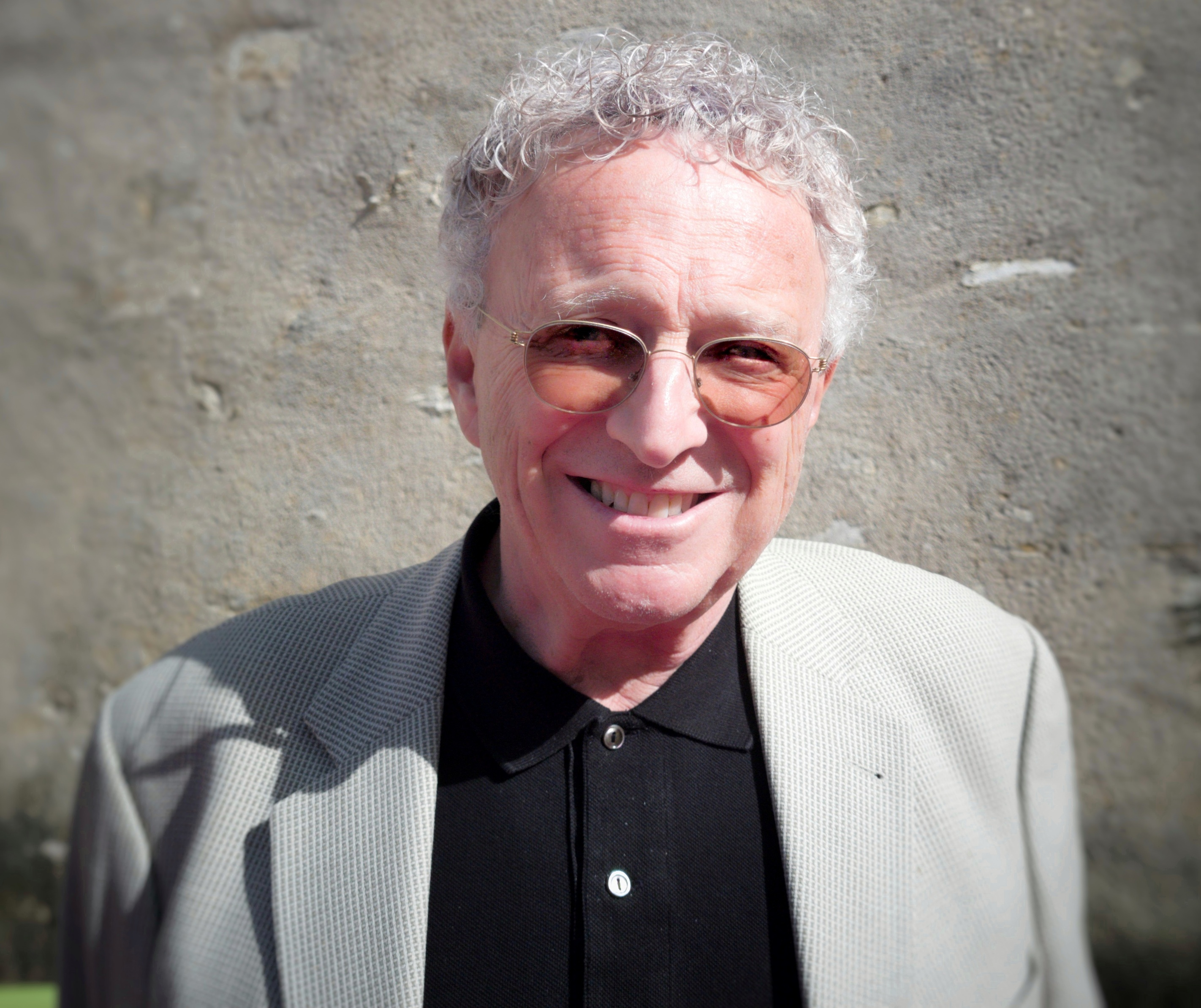
Nelson Monfort

== Scoring ==
Couple	Place	1	2	3	1/2 + 3	4	5	6	7	8	9	10	11
Lénie & Jordan	1	33 + 5 = 38		34	72	36	36	38	36	/	38	39 + 38 = 77	39 + 40 = 79
Florent & Elsa	2	25 + 4 = 29		28	57	32	31	35	31	35	35	33 + 33 = 66	36 + 35 = 71
Adil & Ana	3	26 + 3 = 29		32	61	29	36	34	30	36	39	39 + 38 = 77	38 + 38 = 76
Jungeli & Inès	4		32 + 5 = 37	32	69	36	35	35	34	30	34	34 + 36 = 70	
Mayane & Christophe	4		26 + 3 = 29	25	54	27	27	31	31	26	29	31	
Julie & Adrien	6	23 + 0 = 23		28	51	31	32	30	34	32	30		
Claude & Katrina	7		30 + 0 = 30	32	62	31	29	32	32	28			
Ève & Nino	8		32 + 4 = 36	30	66	26	35	31	31				
Frank & Candice	9		26 + 0 = 26	26	52	28	/	27					
Charlotte & Yann-Alrick	10	20 + 0 = 20		26	46	28	26						
Sophie & Nicolas	11		18	24	42	20							
Nelson & Calisson	12	15		17	32								

Red numbers indicate couples with the lowest score for each week.
Blue numbers indicate couples with the highest score for each week.
indicates couples eliminated that week.
indicates the returning couple who finished in the bottom two or three.
indicates the winning couple.
indicates the runner-up couple.
indicates the third place couple.

=== Notes of each couples ===
Couple	Total	10	9	8	7	6	5	4	3	2	1	Average
Lénie & Jordan	44	18	20	5	1	—N/a						9.3
Florent & Elsa	48	2	16	19	8	2	1	—N/a				8.1
Adil & Ana	48	15	14	8	9	2	—N/a					8.6
Jungeli & Inès	40	3	18	13	6	—N/a						8.5
Mayane & Christophe	36	—N/a	1	8	20	5	2	—N/a				7.0
Julie & Adrien	32	1	1	17	8	4	1	—N/a				7.5
Claude & Katrina	28	—N/a		19	8	1	—N/a					7.6
Ève & Nino	24	—N/a	4	11	7	2	—N/a					7.7
Franck & Candice	16	—N/a			11	5	—N/a					6.7
Charlotte & Yann-Alrick	16	—N/a		1	6	5	4	—N/a				6.3
Sophie & Nicolas	12	—N/a				4	6	2	—N/a			5.2
Nelson & Calisson	8	—N/a					3	3	1	1	—N/a	4.0
Total	352	39	74	101	84	30	17	5	1	1	0	7.8

== Averages ==
This table only counts dances scored on the traditional 40-point scale.

Rank by average	Place	Couple	Total	Number of dances	Average
1	1	Lénie & Jordan	407	11	37.00
2	3	Adil & Ana	415	12	34.58
3	4	Jungeli & Inès	338	10	33.80
4	2	Florent & Elsa	389	12	32.42
5	8	Ève & Nino	185	6	30.83
6	7	Claude & Katrina	214	7	30.57
7	6	Julie & Adrien	240	8	30.00
8	4	Mayane & Christophe	253	9	28.11
9	9	Frank & Candice	107	4	26.75
10	10	Charlotte & Yann-Alrick	100	4	25.00
11	11	Sophie & Nicolas	62	3	20.67
12	12	Nelson & Calisson	32	2	16.00

== Highest and lowest scoring performances ==
The best and worst dance performances according to the judges' marks were, out of 40 points:

Dance	Best dancer	Best score	Worst dancer	Worst score
Salsa	Adil Rami	38	Florent Manaudou	25
Contemporary dance	Jungeli; Florent Manaudou	35	Frank Leboeuf	26
Cha-cha-cha	Jungeli	36	Sophie Davant	18
American Smooth	Adil Rami	39	Nelson Monfort	15
Tango	Jungeli	34	Nelson Monfort	17
Waltz	Lénie	40	Frank Leboeuf; Mayane	26
Quickstep	Adil Rami	38	Frank Leboeuf	28
Rumba	Lénie	38	Ève Gilles	26
Argentine Tango	Lénie	38	Frank Leboeuf	26
Foxtrot	Lénie	36	Charlotte de Turckheim	26
Samba	Jungeli	36	Sophie Davant	20
Paso Doble	Adil Rami; Lénie	39	Frank Leboeuf	27
Jive	Lénie	36	Florent Manaudou	35
Bollywood	Lénie	38	Lénie	38
Freestyle	Lénie	39	Florent Manaudou	36

== Couples' Highest and lowest scoring performances ==
According to the traditional 40-point scale:

Couple	Highest Scoring Dances	Lowest Scoring Dances
Lénie & Jordan	Waltz (40)	Contemporary (33)
Florent & Elsa	Freestyle (36)	Salsa (25)
Adil & Ana	Paso Doble; American Smooth (39)	Salsa (26)
Jungeli & Inès	Samba; Cha-cha-cha (36)	Rumba (30)
Mayane & Christophe	Salsa; Contemporary; Paso Doble (31)	Cha-Cha-Cha (25)
Julie & Adrien	Rumba / Contemporary (34)	Cha-Cha-Cha (23)
Claude & Katrina	American Smooth; Quickstep; Waltz (32)	Cha-Cha-Cha (28)
Ève & Nino	Quickstep (35)	Rumba (26)
Frank & Candice	Quickstep (28)	Waltz / Contemporary; Argentine Tango (26)
Charlotte & Yann-Alrick	Waltz (28)	Cha-Cha-Cha (20)
Sophie & Nicolas	American Smooth (24)	Cha-Cha-Cha (18)
Nelson & Calisson	Tango (17)	American Smooth (15)

== Weekly Scores ==
=== Week 1 ===
Individual judges scores in the chart below (given in parentheses) appeared in this order from left to right: Jean-Marc Généreux, Fauve Hautot, Mel Charlot, and Chris Marques.

Running order

Couple	Score	Style	Music	
Florent & Elsa	25 (7,7,6,5)	Salsa	(I've Had) The Time of My Life - Bill Medley & Jennifer Warnes	
Lénie & Jordan	33 (8,9,8,8)	Contemporary	À Fleur De Toi - Vitaa	
Adil & Ana	26 (6,7,7,6)	Salsa	Sapés comme jamais - Maître Gims Ft Niska	
Charlotte & Yann-Alrick	20 (5,5,5,5)	Cha-Cha-Cha	Recommence-moi - Santa	
Julie & Adrien	23 (6,6,5,6)	Cha-Cha-Cha	I Wanna Dance with Somebody (Who Loves Me) - Whitney Houston	
Nelson & Calisson	15 (4,4,4,3)	American Smooth	Parade - Victor Le Masne	
Imposed Choreography
Lénie & Jordan	+5	Samba	Despacito - Luis Fonsi Ft Daddy Yankee	38
Florent & Elsa	+4	Samba	Despacito - Luis Fonsi Ft Daddy Yankee	29
Adil & Ana	+3	Samba	Despacito - Luis Fonsi Ft Daddy Yankee	29
Julie & Adrien	+0	Samba	Despacito - Luis Fonsi Ft Daddy Yankee	23
Charlotte & Yann-Alrick	+0	Samba	Despacito - Luis Fonsi Ft Daddy Yankee	20

=== Week 2 ===
Individual judges scores in the chart below (given in parentheses) appeared in this order from left to right: Jean-Marc Généreux, Fauve Hautot, Mel Charlot, and Chris Marques.

Running order

Couple	Score	Style	Music	
Claude & Katrina	30 (7,8,8,7)	Tango	Être à la Hauteur - Le Roi Soleil	
Mayane & Christophe	26 (7,6,7,6)	Waltz	À corps perdu - Grégory Lemarchal	
Frank & Candice	26 (6,7,7,6)	Waltz/Contemporary	Beautiful Things - Benson Boone	
Ève & Nino	32 (9,8,8,7)	Tango	Toxic - Britney Spears	
Sophie & Nicolas	18 (5,4,5,4)	Cha-Cha-Cha	Mamma Mia! - ABBA	
Jungeli & Inès	32 (7,9,9,7)	American Smooth	Chaque seconde - Pierre Garnier	
Imposed Choreography
Jungeli & Inès	+5	Salsa	Who Do You Think You Are - Spice Girls	37
Ève & Nino	+4	Salsa	Who Do You Think You Are - Spice Girls	36
Mayane & Christophe	+3	Salsa	Who Do You Think You Are - Spice Girls	29
Claude & Katrina	+0	Salsa	Who Do You Think You Are - Spice Girls	30
Frank & Candice	+0	Salsa	Who Do You Think You Are - Spice Girls	26

=== Week 3 : Personal Story Week ===
Individual judges scores in the chart below (given in parentheses) appeared in this order from left to right: Jean-Marc Généreux, Fauve Hautot, Mel Charlot, and Chris Marques.

Running order

Couple	Score	Style	Music	Result
Florent & Elsa	28 (8,7,7,6)	Waltz	We Are The Champions - Queen	Safe
Lénie & Jordan	34 (9,9,8,8)	Quickstep	Single Ladies (Put A Ring On It) - Beyoncé	Safe
Adil & Ana	32 (9,8,8,7)	Rumba	Les yeux de la mama - Julien Doré	Safe
Mayane & Christophe	25 (7,7,6,5)	Cha-Cha-Cha	Clic Clic Pan Pan - Yanns	Safe
Frank & Candice	26 (7,6,7,6)	Argentine Tango	Que je t'aime - Johnny Hallyday	Bottom 2
Charlotte & Yann-Alrick	26 (6,7,7,6)	Tango	La Chanson des Restos - Les Enfoirés	Safe
Claude & Katrina	32 (8,8,8,8)	American Smooth	(Everything I Do) I Do It for You - Bryan Adams	Safe
Nelson & Calisson	17 (5,5,5,2)	Tango	Everybody (Backstreet's Back) - Backstreet Boys	Eliminated
Ève & Nino	30 (7,8,8,7)	American Smooth	Immortelle - Lara Fabian	Safe
Sophie & Nicolas	24 (6,6,6,6)	American Smooth	Encore un soir - Celine Dion	Safe
Jungeli & Inès	32 (8,8,8,8)	Cha-Cha-Cha	Can You Feel It - The Jackson 5	Safe
Julie & Adrien	28 (7,7,7,7)	American Smooth	Je t'écris - Grégory Lemarchal	Safe
Face to face
Franck & Candice		Paso Doble	Freed from Desire — Gala	Safe
Nelson & Calisson		Paso Doble	Freed from Desire — Gala	Eliminated

=== Week 4 : Disney Week ===
Individual judges scores in the chart below (given in parentheses) appeared in this order from left to right: Jean-Marc Généreux, Fauve Hautot, Mel Charlot, and Chris Marques.

Running order

Couple	Score	Style	Music	Movie	Result
Florent & Elsa	32 (8,8,8,8)	Rumba	L'amour Brille Sous Les Étoiles - Le Roi Lion	Le Roi Lion	Safe
Lénie & Jordan	36 (9,9,9,9)	Fox-Trot	Alice's Theme - Danny Elfman	Alice Au Pays Des Merveilles	Safe
Adil & Ana	29 (8,7,7,7)	Samba	Prince Ali - Richard Darbois	Aladdin	Safe
Mayane & Christophe	27 (7,6,7,7)	American Smooth	Partir Là-bas - Marie Galey	La Petite Sirène	Safe
Charlotte & Yann-Alrick	28 (6,7,7,8)	Waltz	Le Festin - Camille	Ratatouille	Safe
Claude & Katrina	31 (8,8,8,7)	Paso Doble	He's a Pirate - Klaus Badelt	Pirates Des Caraïbes	Bottom 2
Ève & Nino	26 (7,7,6,6)	Rumba	L'Air Du Vent - Laura Mayne	Pocahontas	Safe
Sophie & Nicolas	20 (5,5,5,5)	Samba	Sous L'Océan - Henri Salvador	La Petite Sirène	Eliminated
Jungeli & Inès	36 (9,9,9,9)	Samba	Je Voudrais Déjà Être Roi - Dimitri Rougeul & Michel Prud'homme	Le Roi Lion	Safe
Frank & Candice	28 (7,7,7,7)	Quickstep	Incredibles 2 theme - Michael Giacchino	Les Indestructibles	Safe
Julie & Adrien	31 (8,8,8,7)	Contemporary	Libérée, Délivrée - Anaïs Delva	La Reine Des Neiges	Safe
Face to face
Claude & Katrina		Cha-Cha-Cha	Try Everything — Shakira	Zootopia	Safe
Sophie & Nicolas		Cha-Cha-Cha	Try Everything — Shakira	Zootopia	Eliminated

=== Week 5 : Cinema and TV series week ===
Individual judges scores in the chart below (given in parentheses) appeared in this order from left to right: Jean-Marc Généreux, Fauve Hautot, Mel Charlot, and Chris Marques.

Frank Leboeuf & Candice Pascal were supposed to perform but, Frank got injured and was unable to perform.

Running order

Couple	Score	Style	Music	Movie	Result
Florent & Elsa	31 (8,8,8,7)	Paso Doble	Theme from Mission: Impossible - Lalo Schifrin	Mission: Impossible	Bottom 2
Lénie & Jordan	36 (9,9,9,9)	Rumba	Hymne à l'amour - Édith Piaf	La Môme	Safe
Mayane & Christophe	27 (7,7,7,6)	Rumba	Reality – Richard Sanderson	La Boum	Safe
Adil & Ana	36 (9,9,10,8)	Argentine Tango	Skyfall - Adele	Skyfall	Safe
Charlotte & Yann-Alrick	26 (6,7,7,6)	Fox-Trot	Ouragan - Stéphanie	Les Tuche	Eliminated
Ève & Nino	35 (9,9,9,8)	Quickstep	You're the One That I Want - Olivia Newton-John & John Travolta	Grease	Safe
Claude & Katrina	29 (8,7,7,7)	Rumba	Shallow - Lady Gaga and Bradley Cooper	A Star Is Born	Safe
Julie & Adrien	32 (8,8,8,8)	Tango	Theme From Beverly Hills, 90210 -John E. Davis	Beverly Hills, 90210	Safe
Jungeli & Inès	35 (9,9,9,8)	Contemporary	This Is Me - Keala Settle	The Greatest Showman	Safe
Frank & Candice	N/A	Paso Doble	Bella ciao - Naestro Ft Maître Gims, Slimane, Vitaa & Dadju	La Casa De Papel	Safe
Face to face
Florent & Elsa		Freestyle	Just Because Of You — Jean-Denis Perez	Les Bronzés font du ski	Safe
Charlotte & Yann-Alrick		Freestyle	Just Because Of You — Jean-Denis Perez	Les Bronzés font du ski	Eliminated

=== Week 6 : Mystery guest week ===
Individual judges scores in the chart below (given in parentheses) appeared in this order from left to right: Individual judges scores in the chart below (given in parentheses) appeared in this order from left to right: Jean-Marc Généreux, Fauve Hautot, Mel Charlot, and Chris Marques.

Running order

Couple	Guest(s)	Score	Style	Music	Result
Florent & Elsa	Laurie (mother of Elsa)	35 (9,9,9,8)	Contemporary	SOS d'un terrien en détresse - Daniel Balavoine	Safe
Lénie & Jordan	Nikos Aliagas	38 (9,10,10,9)	Argentine Tango	Ta Reine - Angèle	Safe
Mayane & Christophe	Mathilda (friend of Mayane)	31 (8,8,8,7)	Salsa	Le sens de la vie - Tal	Safe
Adil & Ana	Feda & Nadia (sisters of Adil)	34 (9,8,9,8)	Contemporary	Les Murs Porteurs - Florent Pagny	Safe
Frank & Candice	Vincent Moscato	27 (7,7,7,6)	Paso Doble	Bella ciao - Naestro Ft Maître Gims, Slimane, Vitaa & Dadju	Eliminated
Ève & Nino	Simon Favier (boyfriend of Ève)	31 (8,8,8,7)	Contemporary	All by Myself – Céline Dion	Bottom 2
Claude & Katrina	Julie (mother of Katrina)	32 (8,8,8,8)	Quickstep	Another Day of Sun from La La Land	Safe
Jungeli & Inès	Élodie Michon (teacher of Jungeli)	35 (9,9,9,8)	Waltz	Je Fais De Toi Mon Essentiel - Emmanuel Moire	Safe
Julie & Adrien	Anggun	30 (8,8,7,7)	Samba	Crazy in Love - Beyoncé & Jay-Z	Safe
Face to face
Ève & Nino			Paso Doble	Eye of the Tiger — Survivor	Safe
Franck & Candice			Paso Doble	Eye of the Tiger — Survivor	Eliminated

=== Week 7 : Battle of the judges week ===
Individual judges scores in the chart below (given in parentheses) appeared in this order from left to right: Individual judges scores in the chart below (given in parentheses) appeared in this order from left to right: Jean-Marc Généreux, Fauve Hautot, Kamel Ouali, Mel Charlot and Chris Marques.

Each couples dance in trio with one of the judge.

Running order

Couple	Judge	Score	Style	Music	Result
Florent & Elsa	Fauve Hautot	31 (8,X,7,9,7)	Argentine Tango	À ma place - Zazie & Axel Bauer	Bottom 3
Lénie & Jordan	Jean-Marc Généreux	36 (X,10,7,10,9)	Jive	Proud Mary - Ike & Tina Turner	Safe
Adil & Ana	Mel Charlot	30 (7,7,9,X,7)	Cha-Cha-Cha	Miami - Will Smith	Bottom 3
Claude & Katrina	Chris Marques	32 (8,8,8,8,X)	Waltz	Die with a Smile - Lady Gaga & Bruno Mars	Safe
Mayane & Christophe	Jean-Marc Généreux	31 (X,7,9,7,8)	Contemporary	Aimée Pour De Vrai - Helena	Safe
Eve & Nino	Fauve Hautot	31 (8,X,7,8,8)	Paso Doble	XXL - Mylène Farmer	Eliminated
Julie & Adrien	Mel Charlot	34 (8,7,10,X,9)	Rumba / Contemporary	Ordinaire - Céline Dion	Safe
Jungeli & Inès	Chris Marques	34 (7,9,10,8,X)	Tango	Celui Qui Part - Joseph Kamel	Safe
Face to face
Florent & Elsa			Samba	Et c'est parti... — Nâdiya	Safe
Adil & Ana			Samba	Et c'est parti... — Nâdiya	Safe
Ève & Nino			Samba	Et c'est parti... — Nâdiya	Eliminated

=== Week 8 : 90's and 00's week ===
Individual judges scores in the chart below (given in parentheses) appeared in this order from left to right: Individual judges scores in the chart below (given in parentheses) appeared in this order from left to right: Jean-Marc Généreux, Fauve Hautot, Mel Charlot and Chris Marques.

Lénie & Jordan were supposed to perform but, Lénie was sick and was unable to perform.

Running order

Couple	Score	Style	Music	Result
Florent & Elsa	35 (9,9,9,8)	Samba	Je danse le Mia - IAM	Safe
Lénie & Jordan	N/A	Samba	Get Right - Jennifer Lopez	Safe
Adil & Ana	36 (9,10,9,8)	Waltz	End Of The Road - Boyz II Men	Safe
Mayane & Christophe	26 (7,7,7,5)	Samba	Jeune Demoiselle - Diam's	Bottom 2
Claude & Katrina	28 (7,8,7,6)	Cha-Cha-Cha	Femme Like U (Donne-moi ton corps) - K.Maro	Eliminated
Julie & Adrien	32 (8,8,8,8)	Paso Doble	Les Rois du monde - Roméo et Juliette	Safe
Jungeli & Inès	30 (8,7,8,7)	Rumba	Sous le vent - Garou & Céline Dion	Safe
Face to face
Mayane & Christophe		Tango	Partir Un Jour — 2Be3	Safe
Claude & Katrina		Tango	Partir Un Jour — 2Be3	Eliminated

=== Week 9 : The troupes ===
Individual judges scores in the chart below (given in parentheses) appeared in this order from left to right: Individual judges scores in the chart below (given in parentheses) appeared in this order from left to right: Jean-Marc Généreux, Fauve Hautot, Mel Charlot and Chris Marques.

Each couple will be accompanied by a dance troupe for their routine.

Running order

Couple	Troupe	Score	Style	Music	Result
Lénie & Jordan	Mahina Khanum	38 (10,10,9,9)	Bollywood	Jai Ho! (You Are My Destiny) - A R. Rahman ft The Pussycat Dolls	Safe
Florent & Elsa	Les Folies Gruss	35 (9,9,10,7)	American Smooth	Your Song - Ewan McGregor & Alessandro Safina	Safe
Mayane & Christophe	Gam Compagnie & Paris Marais Dance School	29 (8,7,7,7)	Tango	L'assasymphonie - Mozart, l'opéra rock	Bottom 2
Adil & Ana	MagicLab	39 (10,10,10,9)	Paso Doble	O Fortuna – Carmina Burana	Safe
Julie & Adrien	Cabaret troupe	30 (8,8,8,6)	Quickstep	Show Me How You Burlesque - Christina Aguilera	Eliminated
Jungeli & Inès	Irish Celtic	34 (9,9,9,7)	Paso Doble	Fan - Pascal Obispo	Safe
Face to face
Mayane & Christophe			Waltz	Lose Control — Teddy Swims	Safe
Julie & Adrien			Waltz	Lose Control — Teddy Swims	Eliminated

=== Week 10 : Semi-Final ===
Individual judges scores in the chart below (given in parentheses) appeared in this order from left to right: Individual judges scores in the chart below (given in parentheses) appeared in this order from left to right: Jean-Marc Généreux, Fauve Hautot, Mel Charlot, and Chris Marques.

In the first round, the couple finishing last according to the judges is directly sent in face-to-face without passing by the second round.
On the second dance, each couple will discover their routine, the music, the costumes, the scenography approximatively 1mn45 before the dance.

Running order

Couple	Score	Total	Style	Music	Result
Lénie & Jordan	39 (10,9,10,10)	77	Paso Doble	Désenchantée - Mylène Farmer	Safe
Lénie & Jordan	38 (9,10,10,9)	77	Rumba	Popcorn Salé - Santa	Safe
Florent & Elsa	33 (9,8,8,8)	66	Cha-cha-cha	You Should Be Dancing - Bee Gees	Bottom 3
Florent & Elsa	33 (9,8,8,8)	66	Rumba	Nous On Sait - Pierre Garnier	Bottom 3
Mayane & Christophe	31 (8,8,8,7)	31	Paso Doble	Tourner dans le vide - Indila	Eliminated
Mayane & Christophe	N/A	31	/	/	Eliminated
Adil & Ana	39 (10,10,10,9)	77	American Smooth	I'll Never Love Again - Lady Gaga	Safe
Adil & Ana	38 (9,9,10,10)	77	Salsa	Wanna Be Startin' Somethin' – Michael Jackson	Safe
Jungeli & Inès	34 (8,9,9,8)	70	Quickstep	It's Not Unusual - Tom Jones	Eliminated
Jungeli & Inès	36 (8,10,10,8)	70	Cha-cha-cha	Alexandrie Alexandra - Claude François	Eliminated
Face to face
Florent & Elsa			Samba	Bella — Maître Gims	Safe
Mayane & Christophe			Samba	Bella — Maître Gims	Eliminated
Jungeli & Inès			Samba	Bella — Maître Gims	Eliminated

=== Week 11 : Final ===
Individual judges scores in the chart below (given in parentheses) appeared in this order from left to right: Individual judges scores in the chart below (given in parentheses) appeared in this order from left to right: Jean-Marc Généreux, Fauve Hautot, Mel Charlot, and Chris Marques.

Running order

Couple	Score	Total	Style	Music	Result
Lénie & Jordan	39 (10,10,10,9)	79	Freestyle	Waka Waka (This Time for Africa) - Shakira	Winner
Lénie & Jordan	40 (10,10,10,10)	79	Waltz	Don't Speak - Postmodern Jukebox & Haley Reinhart	Winner
Florent & Elsa	36 (10,9,9,8)	71	Freestyle	Je suis malade - Serge Lama	2nd place
Florent & Elsa	35 (9,9,9,8)	71	Jive	Footloose - Kenny Loggins	2nd place
Adil & Ana	38 (10,10,10,8)	76	Freestyle	Papaoutai - Stromae	3rd Place
Adil & Ana	38 (9,10,10,9)	76	Quickstep	Everybody Needs Somebody to Love - The Blues Brothers	3rd Place
The Last Dance
Lénie & Jordan	69%		Rumba	Hymne à l'amour - Édith Piaf	
Florent & Elsa	31%		Salsa	(I've Had) The Time of My Life - Bill Medley & Jennifer Warnes	

== Dance Chart ==
Couple	1		2		3	4	5	6	7	8	9	10		11		
Lénie & Jordan	Contemporary	Samba	-	-	Quickstep	Foxtrot	Rumba	Argentine Tango	Jive	-	Bollywood	Paso Doble	Rumba	Freestyle	Waltz	Rumba
Florent & Elsa	Salsa	Samba	-	-	Waltz	Rumba	Paso Doble	Contemporary	Argentine Tango	Samba	American Smooth	Cha-Cha-Cha	Rumba	Freestyle	Jive	Salsa
Adil & Ana	Salsa	Samba	-	-	Rumba	Samba	Argentine Tango	Contemporary	Cha-cha-cha	Waltz	Paso Doble	American Smooth	Salsa	Freestyle	Quickstep	
Jungeli & Inès	-	-	American Smooth	Salsa	Cha-Cha-Cha	Samba	Contemporary	Waltz	Tango	Rumba	Paso Doble	Quickstep	Cha-cha-cha			
Mayane & Christophe	-	-	Waltz	Salsa	Cha-Cha-Cha	American Smooth	Rumba	Salsa	Contemporary	Samba	Tango	Paso Doble				
Julie & Adrien	Cha-Cha-Cha	Samba	-	-	American Smooth	Contemporary	Tango	Samba	Rumba / Contemporary	Paso Doble	Quickstep					
Claude & Katrina	-	-	Tango	Salsa	American Smooth	Paso Doble	Rumba	Quickstep	Waltz	Cha-Cha-Cha						
Ève & Nino	-	-	Tango	Salsa	American Smooth	Rumba	Quickstep	Contemporary	Paso Doble							
Frank & Candice	-	-	Waltz / Contemporary	Salsa	Argentine Tango	Quickstep	-	Paso Doble								
Charlotte & Yann-Alrick	Cha-Cha-Cha	Samba	-	-	Tango	Waltz	Foxtrot									
Sophie & Nicolas	-	-	Cha-Cha-Cha	-	American Smooth	Samba										
Nelson & Calisson	American Smooth	-	-	-	Tango											

Highest scoring dance
Lowest scoring dance
Danced, but not scored
