= Reality (Richard Sanderson song) =

1980 single by Richard Sanderson

Single by Richard Sanderson

from the album La Boum
- B-side: "Gotta Get a Move On"; "Maybe You're Wrong" (1987 re-release)
- Released: 1980
- Recorded: 1980
- Studio: Barclay Studios, Paris, France
- Genre: Soft rock
- Length: 4:47 (Album version); 3:58 (Radio edit)
- Label: Barclay; Polydor; Universal
- Songwriter: Vladimir Cosma
- Producer: Pierre Richard Muller

Audio sample
- file; help

Music video
- "Reality" on YouTube

1987 re-release

"Reality" is a song by French composer Vladimir Cosma, performed by English singer Richard Sanderson. It was released in 1980 as part of the soundtrack to the popular 1980 French film La Boum, which starred French actress Sophie Marceau.

"Reality" is a ballad composed and written by Vladimir Cosma (under the name of Jeff Jordan) and produced by Pierre Richard Muller. In the film La Boum, it appears frequently (usually during the actors' romantic scenes), being the film's main theme song. For the film's 1982 sequel, La Boum 2, the main song was changed to "Your Eyes", performed by Cook da Books. Because "Reality" has the same key as "Go On Forever" (another song played in the last part of the film, from the La Boum soundtrack and sung by Sanderson and Chantal Curtis), both songs are musically linked at the end of the film.

Between 1980 and 1982, then in 1987 after its re-release, "Reality" became a major hit in Europe and Asia, topping the charts in fifteen countries including Germany, France, Italy, Austria, Finland and Switzerland. The song led Richard Sanderson to stardom, giving him more hits with Cosma such as "Your Eyes", "She's a Lady", and "Sun".

"Reality" has been covered many times by various artists, including one singing a Spanish version of the song ("Sin ti" by Hombres G). On DSDS, the German equivalent of American Idol, the song has been sung multiple times.

It also served as the theme song to the 2011 Korean film Sunny.

== Versions ==
In the 1980s, "Reality" became an instant hit in some countries in Europe, Japan, South Korea, Hong Kong and the Philippines. It has been released in various forms. Some of them were remixed or mashed up, and released on one of Sanderson's compilation albums and/or played on radio stations.

=== Single ===
The single version of the song omits some verses on the second repetition of the chorus (Maybe my foolishness is past, and maybe now at last, I see how the real thing can be), and ends with a fade effect. This version can be found on the singles released between 1980 and 1987, normally with another song from La Boum (most original copies had "Gotta Get a Move On" (Instrumental) by Karoline Krüger on the B-side, although some came with "I Can't Swim" or "Swingin' Around") and on The Best of Richard Sanderson.

=== Album ===
The album version of the song has the omitted lines and ends with a defined musical melody. This is the most common version. It can be found on La Boum Original Soundtrack (old and new editions and the English edition), Sanderson's studio album Reality and compilation albums of his.

=== Instrumental ===
An instrumental version appears on some vinyl editions of the single, the new edition of La Boum Original Soundtrack and The Best of Richard Sanderson. This version has a synth sound replacing Sanderson's voice, and a different guitar solo.

=== Extended ===
There's an extended version of the song whose duration is about eight minutes and which repeats the verses and the chorus, as well as the guitar solo three times. It appears on The Best of Richard Sanderson.

=== The Special Mix ===
Finally, there's a version called The Special Mix, which is a mashup of the album version and the instrumental version. It appears on some of Sanderson's EPs and compilation albums.

=== 2009 ===
In 2009, Cosma and Sanderson made a new version of the song – this one having an orchestra style instead of synthesized sounds, and replacing the guitar solo. Sanderson's vocals were rerecorded for this version, except for the first verses.

=== 2010 ===
There's also a 2010 version of the song with new synthesized sounds made by Sanderson.

=== Instrumental or orchestral versions ===
In the film, the song's main melody is heard repeatedly with different sounds. Here are the songs that have the main melody and appear on the new edition of La Boum Soundtrack:

- La rentrée
- Poupette harpiste
- Retrouvailles sentimentales
- Vic et Mathieu au ralenti

== Chart positions ==
=== Weekly charts ===
Chart (1981—1987)	Peak position
Austria (Ö3 Austria Top 40)	1
Belgium (Ultratop 50 Flanders)	16
France (SNEP)	1
Italy (AFI)	1
Japan (Oricon)	11
Switzerland (Schweizer Hitparade)	1
West Germany (GfK)	1

== Certifications ==
Region	Certification	Certified units/sales
France (SNEP)	Platinum	1,000,000^{*}
Italy (FIMI)	Platinum	600,000
^{*} Sales figures based on certification alone.

== See also ==
- List of best-selling singles in France
- "Your Name Engraved Herein"

== Notes ==
- I singoli più venduti del 1981 at Hit Parade Italia
- German Top 20 - Top 400 Of The Decade, The 80s by Markus Tolksdorf
