= Resonnances =

- Official Teaser Poster
- Directed by: Philippe Robert
- Written by: Philippe Robert
- Produced by: Guillaume Raphoz; Philippe Robert
- Starring: Majorie Dubesset; Franck Monsigny; Sophie Michard
- Cinematography: Philippe Robert
- Edited by: Philippe Robert
- Music by: Richard Sanderson
- Production company: Origin Art
- Distributed by: Ascot Elite
- Release dates: July 2006 (Fantasia Film Festival); 5 April 2007
- Running time: 80 minutes
- Country: France
- Language: French

Resonnances is a 2006 French horror film written and directed by Philippe Robert. It stars Marjorie Dubesset, Franck Monsigny and Sophie Michard.

== Plot ==
After the three law students Thomas, Yann and Vincent have passed their tests, it says "party time". The aim of the boisterous Party Weekend is the low-lying forest in a disco "Panorama". Along the way they meet at a gas station acting suspiciously leaving the hitch-hiker Sébastien, whom they take in spite of the news story about a psychopath who had escaped.

Just when this begins to show his nasty side, they got into an unnaturally dense mist coming off the road and plunging into a deep ravine. The fatal crash is however hampered by the thick branches of fir trees, so that the four men arrive, although injured, some seriously, but still alive on the ground. No reception for mobile phones, the next village several kilometers away, a mortally wounded friend, and probably a psychopathic killer in their group.

As the men have to quickly discover, has taken root in the ground beneath their feet a bit. Something very big. Something that moves fast in the ground as the men on the earth. And it prefers to eat men!

== Cast ==
- Johanna Andraos
- Marjorie Dubesset
- Vincent Lecompte
- Sophie Michard
- Franck Monsigny
- Patrick Mons
- Romain Ogerau
- Livane Revel
- Yann Sundberg
- Thomas Vallegeas

== Release ==
The film premiered on 5 April 2007 as part of the Festival Mauvais and was released as Direct to DVD on 9 April 2008 in France.

== Soundtrack ==
The soundtrack was composed by British musician Richard Sanderson.
