= Richard Sanderson =

English musician (born 1953)

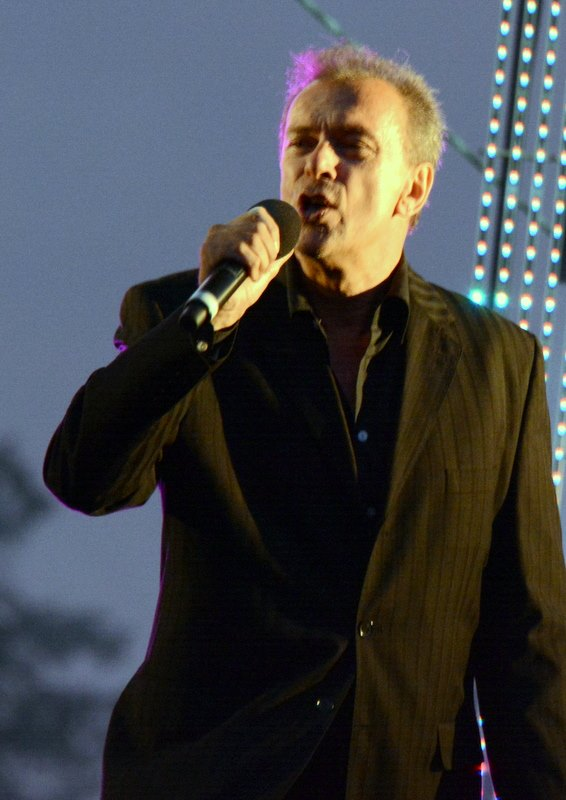
- Sanderson in 2013

Background information
- Also known as: Richard Lory
- Born: 5 March 1953 (age 73); Taplow, England
- Genres: Pop
- Occupations: Singer, composer
- Years active: 1968–present
- Labels: Disques Vogue, Warner Bros.
- Website: Richard Sanderson official website

Richard Sanderson (born 5 March 1953 in Taplow) is an English singer, best known for his hit songs, "Reality", "So Many Ways" and "She's a Lady".

== Career ==
Born in England to a Scottish drum-playing father and a French accordionist mother, Sanderson was instilled with a love of music at a young age, and soon become a musician himself.

He started playing classical music on the piano at age five. At 15, he studied guitar and two years later became the organ player of a local rock band, Lover's Love. The band released four singles, one of them being "Youth Has Gone (Amour De Papier)", a song that he would revisit years later, "Find a Reason Why". Three years later he became the official pianist of Nancy Hollaway and David Christie. At 21, he formed his own band and played in hotels all around the world. He then left for the United States and played with different bands while studying harmony and orchestration at the Berklee College of Music.

At 25, Sanderson returned to England and was hired at the famous Trident recording studio. Under Vogue Records he released his first solo single "Un Vent de Folie" under the name 'Richard Lory'. Then he released No Stickers Please in 1979, his first album. At Trident studio, he met film composer Vladimir Cosma and was selected to perform the main theme of the hit film La Boum starring Sophie Marceau. He sings lead vocals on the songs "Reality", "Murky Turkey", and "Go On Forever". The songs appeared on the film's soundtrack album and as singles with other songs of the film.

The song "Reality" became a number one hit in 15 countries, including France, Germany, Austria, Italy and Switzerland, and sold eight million copies all around Europe and Asia. "Reality" is well known in Germany and it has been covered multiple times on DSDS, the German version of American Idol.

In 1982, Polygram released Sanderson's album I'm in Love. The German version is different in two tracks from the French version ("Not Made for Me" and "Reality"). The single "She's a Lady" became number one in Italy and number four in Europe and Asia, selling more than three million copies. The album Surprise was released in 1984, with "Your Eyes" from La Boum 2, sung by him instead of Cook da Books. The album is now a rarity.

Fairy Tale was released in 1984 as the film score of L'unique. The album would be released in CD format three years later. In 1987, he released the album Reality, under the Carrere label, and Songs for Lovers under the label Blow Up.

In 1990, he released his last pop music album, Anytime at All. The song "When the Night Comes" became number one in Asia, and "So Many Ways" reached the top ten in RFA.

Sanderson composed for Barbara Hendricks, and produced a few albums of Jewish music. The beauty of these Shabbat songs inspired him to record some of them in English with modern orchestrations. His album Legend: Visiting the Testament was released in 1999.

In 2009, he made the album Re-creátion where he sang his favourite songs. In 2011, he released Sings the Classics (Re-creátion under the Sound and Vision label).

Sanderson has two compilation albums: The Best of Richard Sanderson, released in 1984 as a two-CD album, and Greatest Hits: The Very Best of Richard Sanderson, another two-CD album where the first CD has digital remasterizations of his hits and the second CD has covers of his favourite songs.

=== As composer ===
At age 35, Sanderson began working on film scores and became the official composer of Daniel Costelle, director of many historical documentary films such as La Victoire en Couleurs, which was nominated for an Emmy award in 1995 for Best Foreign Film.

He has scored four films: Resonnances, Acharnés, Adam et Ève, C'est facile et ça peut rapporter... 20 ans and the TV miniseries Unknown Images: The Vietnam War.

== Discography ==
=== Albums ===
- 1979: No Stickers Please
- 1980: La Boum (film score)
- 1981: I'm in Love
- 1982: Surprise (with songs from the film La Boum 2)
- 1983: Gym Tonic (writer of fifteen songs)
- 1984: Fairy Tale (film score of the film L'unique)
- 1987: Reality
- 1990: Anytime at All
- 1999: Legend: Visiting the Testament
- 2006: Les Plus Belles Chansons D'amour Du Cinema
- 2009: Re-creátion
- 2011: Sings the Classics
- 2018: How to Be Elegant
- 2023: Legend (Visiting the Testament)

=== Compilations ===
- 1984: The Best of Richard Sanderson
- 1987: Songs for Lovers
- 2005: Dreams Are My Reality
- 2010: Greatest Hits: The Best of Richard Sanderson

=== Singles ===
- 1971: "Youth Has Gone (Amour Du Papier)/After Yours" with Lover's Love
- 1971: "Le Balayeur de Harlem/Comme un Enfant" with Lover's Love
- 1979: "Un Vent de Folie/Viens Voir un film de Fred Astaire" as Richard Lory
- 1979: "Never Let You Go"
- 1980: "Reality"
- 1980: "I Feel the Music"
- 1980: "Go On Forever"
- 1980: "Reality/Swingin' Around"
- 1981: "She's a Lady/Junie Bug"
- 1981: "When I'm in Love/Close the Gate"
- 1982: "Your Eyes/Playground"
- 1982: "L'Hôtel/Une Semaine Avec Toi"
- 1982: "Lovely Lady"
- 1982: "When I'm in Love"
- 1983: "Stiamo Insieme/L'Hôtel"
- 1983: "Sun"
- 1983: "Check on the List/Let There Be Belief"
- 1984: "Find a Reason Why"
- 1984: "See What's Going On"
- 1984: "Check on the List/Something New"
- 1987: "Lovely Lady"
- 1988: "So Many Ways"
- 1988: "Maybe You're Wrong"
- 1990: "When the Night Comes"
- 1990: "Anytime at All"
