= Jungeli =

Congolese-French musician (born 2008)

- Jungeli in 2026

Background information
- Born: Joel Ungeli Shinga; 6 October 2008 (age 18); Kinshasa, Democratic Republic of the Congo
- Genres: Congolese rumba; Ndombolo; hip-hop; R&B
- Occupations: singer; songwriter
- Instrument: Vocals
- Years active: 2023–present
- Labels: Next Génération; Fulgu Prod; 2054 Records; The Orchard; Capitol Music France

Joel Ungeli Shinga (born 6 October 2008), known professionally as Jungeli, is a Congolese singer, songwriter and television personality. Raised in Sevran, he began his recording career in mid-2023 and later introduced his debut single, "À moi" on 12 July of that year, which went relatively unnoticed.

Ungeli received widespread mainstream recognition following the release of his second single, "Petit Génie" (featuring Imen Es, Alonzo, Abou Debeing, and Lossa), which debuted on 4 August 2023 and achieved commercial success in France, topping SNEP's Top Singles chart for 18 non-consecutive weeks. It became the fastest song of the year in France to achieve platinum certification and earned the Best African or African-inspired Music award at Les Flammes, as well as a nomination for Best New International Artist at the BET Awards. The song later appeared on his 2024 debut studio album, En attendant pour le peuple, which was certified gold by SNEP.

== Early years ==
Jungeli was born Joel Ungeli Shinga on 6 October 2008, in Kinshasa, Democratic Republic of the Congo, and moved to France at the age of nine. He was raised in Sevran, a commune located in the Seine-Saint-Denis department, part of the northeastern suburbs of Paris in Île-de-France. During his childhood, he listened to music from the Democratic Republic of the Congo and considers Fally Ipupa one of his influences. In an interview with the French weekly television magazine Télé-Loisirs, Jungeli revealed that he is currently a high school freshman working toward his Baccalauréat while balancing his studies with his music career.

== Career ==
=== Mid to late 2023: "À moi", breakthrough with "Petit Génie" and standalone releases ===
In the early summer of 2023, Jungeli introduced his debut single, "À moi", through social media platforms, though it initially garnered limited attention. The song was officially released on multiple music platforms on 12 July, and its accompanying music video on YouTube accumulated over 620,000 views.

Jungeli commenced work on his second single "Petit Génie" shortly after "À moi" debut. Excerpts of the single were prematurely leaked and extensively shared on TikTok, leading to a surge in popularity even before its official release on 4 August 2023. In an interview with Ivorian Life TV on the WAM show, hosted by Willy Dumbo, he revealed that "Petit Génie" was meant to "make people happy", and did not anticipate its overwhelming success. Produced by Next Génération, 2054 Records, and Fulgu Prod, labels he had just signed with, "Petit Génie" was composed by DJ Wiils, with the music video directed by Bastos and produced by Mania Film, featuring guest appearances from Imen Es, Alonzo, Abou Debeing, and Lossa. Jungeli's refrain "Mwana natikaka moke sima ekoli oya oye" pays tribute to the famed Congolese atalaku Brigade Sabarti, who popularized this phrase in their 2009 smash hit "Techno Malewa Automatique" by Werrason and Wenge Musica Maison Mère. Alonzo's rap verse makes a nod to the legendary Pépé Kallé. "Petit Génie" quickly attained commercial success in France, dominating the SNEP Top Singles chart for 18 non-consecutive weeks and surpassing the previous record set by Ed Sheeran's "Shape of You", which held the top spot for 15 non-consecutive weeks. The song broke records as the fastest to reach platinum in France that year. It also won the Best African or African-inspired Music award at Les Flammes and earned Jungeli a nomination for Best New International Artist at the BET Awards. He later signed a distribution deal with Capitol Music France, a subsidiary of Universal Music France.

On 24 November 2023, Jungeli was featured as a guest artist on Emma'a's single "Katana", from her self-titled album. The following month, he made an appearance on Big Ben's track "C'est qui?" and released the single "Rashel" in collaboration with Moroccan-Belgian singer Dystinct.

=== 2024–present: Collaborations and En attendant pour le peuple ===
On 19 January 2024, Jungeli made another appearance on Emma'a's single "Biso Mibale", preceding the release of his singles "Bijou" and "Yebisa Bango" on 23 January 2024. "Yebisa Bango", produced by Gabriel and Zafy, explored the theme of love, a motif that is also central to "Bijou", which was composed by YAM and Unleaded.

On 2 February 2024, Jungeli teamed up with Vegedream, Alonzo, and Zaho for the platinum-certified hit "T'étais où?", which was produced by DJ Wiils, directed by Styck, and co-produced under Daylight Productions and Ma Nia Film. On 22 March, Jungeli appeared on fellow Congolese-French singer Singuila's song "Tricheur" before featuring on Bolémvn's "On y va" from his four-track Extended Play (EP), Canada Goose. On 7 June, he made a guest appearance on Youka's single "Allo", followed by a showing on the final day of the Somarôho Festival at Ambodivoanio Stadium in Andoany, Nosy-Be, on 11 August. On 1 November 2024, he made a guest appearance on Imagine Dragons' third remix of "Take Me to the Beach" off their album Loom.

Jungeli released his debut studio album En attendant pour le peuple on 8 November under the labels Next Génération, Fulgu Prod, and 2054 Records. The project spans three discs, featuring 15 tracks on the first, 11 bonus tracks on the second, including previously released hits like "Petit Génie", "Rashel", "Briller", "Bijou", "Yebisa Bango", and "T'étais où?", and an additional five tracks on the third disc. He shared with CNews that the album aims to appeal to "both younger and older generations" with the art cover depicting his student life by showing him sitting on a school desk, holding a microphone, and surrounded by scattered classroom supplies. The standout track, "Évidemment", featuring Dadju, quickly rose on YouTube trends. Later that month, on 22 November, he opened for Fally Ipupa at the Zénith de Lille.

On 4 April 2025, he teamed up with French singer Lenie for the single "À tes côtés", which gained over 300,000 views on YouTube within a day, topped the platform's trending list, and quickly entered the SNEP Top Singles chart, peaking at No. 44. On 16 August, he appeared on Fort Boyard with Élodie Gossuin's team to support UNICEF. On 5 October, at just 16 years old, Jungeli became the second youngest artist ever to perform at the Olympia, following Priscilla Betti, who was 13 in 2003, and ahead of Elsa Lunghini, who was 17 in 1990.

== Television career ==
On 14 February 2025, Jungeli joined Danse avec les stars for its 14th season on TF1, hosted by Camille Combal. Partnered with professional dancer Inès Vandamme, he competed until the semi-finals, where they were eliminated on 19 April.

== Discography ==
=== Studio album ===
Title	Details	Peak chart position				Certifications
Title	Details	FRA	WAL	FLA	SUI	Certifications
En attendant pour le peuple	Single, Released: 12 July 2023; Label: Next Génération, 2054 Records, and Fulgu Prod	32	–	–	–	FR: Gold (SNEP)

=== Singles ===
Title	Year	Peak chart positions			Certifications	Album
Title	Year	FRA	BEL	SUI	Certifications	Album
"À moi"	2023	–	–	–		–
"Petit Génie" (feat. Abou Debeing, Imen Es, Alonzo and Lossa)	2023	1	6	33	FR: Platinum (SNEP)	En attendant pour le peuple
"Rashel" (feat. Dystinct)	2023	188	–	–		En attendant pour le peuple
"Pleure pas" (feat. Melina)	2024	–	–	–		–
"Biso Mibale"	2024	–	–	–		–
"Yebisa Bango"	2024	–	–	–		En attendant pour le peuple
"Bijou"	2024	–	–	–		En attendant pour le peuple
"T'étais où?" (feat. Vegedream, Alonzo, Zaho)	2024	47	–	–	FR: Platinum (SNEP)	–
"C'est toi (Kk Yo)"	2024	–	–	–		–
"Petit Génie" (Italian Remix) (feat. Rhove, Germo67, Imes Es, Lossa)	2024	–	–	–		–
"Briller"	2024	–	–	–		En attendant pour le peuple
"L'envers du décor"	2024	–	–	–		En attendant pour le peuple
"Évidemment" (feat. Dadju)	2024	130	–	–		En attendant pour le peuple
"Doku"	2025	–	–	–		En attendant pour le peuple
"À tes côtés" (feat. Lenie)	2025	44	–	–	FR: Gold (SNEP)	En attendant pour le peuple
"Dans la vie"	2025	–	–	–		En attendant pour le peuple
"T'en fais pas"	2025	–	–	–		En attendant pour le peuple

== Awards and nominations ==
Year	Event	Prize	Recipient	Result	Ref.
2024	Les Flammes	Best African or African-inspired Music	"Petit Génie" (with Imen Es, Alonzo, Abou Debeing, and Lossa)	Won	
2024	BET Awards	Best New International Act	Himself	Nominated	
2024	NRJ Music Awards	Francophone Revelation	Himself	Nominated	
2024	NRJ Music Awards	Social Hit	"Petit Génie" (with Imen Es, Alonzo, Abou Debeing, and Lossa)	Won	
2024	African Entertainment Awards USA	Best Collaboration	"Petit Génie" (with Imen Es, Alonzo, Abou Debeing, and Lossa)	Nominated	
2024	Grand prix SACEM	SDRM Prize	"Petit Génie" (with Imen Es, Alonzo, Abou Debeing, and Lossa)	Won	
2024	Les Bravos d'Or	Most-listened Song on Digital	"Petit Génie" (with Imen Es, Alonzo, Abou Debeing, and Lossa)	Won	
2025	Trace Awards & Festival	Best Artist (Europe)	Himself	Nominated	
2025	NRJ Music Awards	Francophone Collaboration of the Year	"À tes côtés" (with Lenie)	Won	
