= Danse avec les stars season 15 =

Season of French television series

Danse avec les stars
- Season 15
- No. of episodes: 11

Release
- Original network: TF1
- Original release: 23 January – 17 April 2026

Season chronology
- ← Previous; Season 14

The fifteenth season of Danse avec les stars (the French version of Strictly Come Dancing) will premiere in January 2026 on TF1, hosted by Camille Combal.

== Participants ==
Celebrity	Known for	Partner	Status
Philippe Lellouche	Actor, Film director & TV host	Katrina Patchett	Eliminated 1st on 13 February 2026
Stéphane Bern	TV host, Radio host & Actor	Calisson Goasdoué	Eliminated 2nd on 20 February 2026
Ian Ziering	Actor	Denitsa Ikonomova	Eliminated 3rd on 6 March 2026
Angélique Angarni-Filopon	Miss France 2025	Yann-Alrick Mortreuil	Eliminated 4th on 13 March 2026
Laure Manaudou	Swimmer	Christian Millette	Eliminated 5th on 20 March 2026
Julien Lieb	Singer	Elsa Bois	Eliminated 6th on 27 March 2026
Marcus	Social media influencer	Marie Denigot	Eliminated 7th on 3 April 2026
Lucie Bernardoni	Singer & Star Academy coach	Christophe Licata	Eliminated 8th on 10 April 2026
Maghla	Streamer & YouTuber	Adrien Caby	Eliminated 8th on 10 April 2026
Emma	Singer	Dorian Rollin	Third Place on 17 April 2026
Juju Fitcats	YouTuber & TV host	Jordan Mouillerac	Runners-up on 17 April 2026
Samuel Bambi	Comedian & Actor	Ana Riera	Winners on 17 April 2026

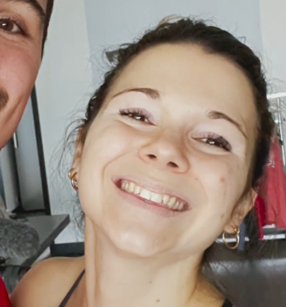
Juju Fitcats

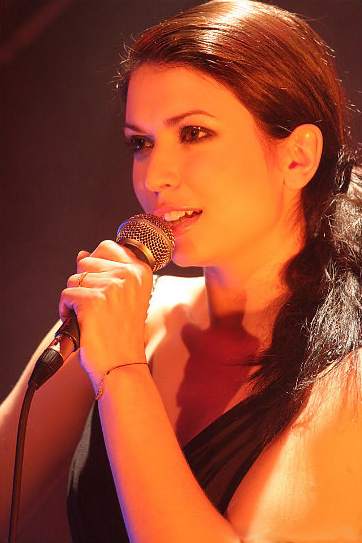
Lucie Bernardoni

Maghla

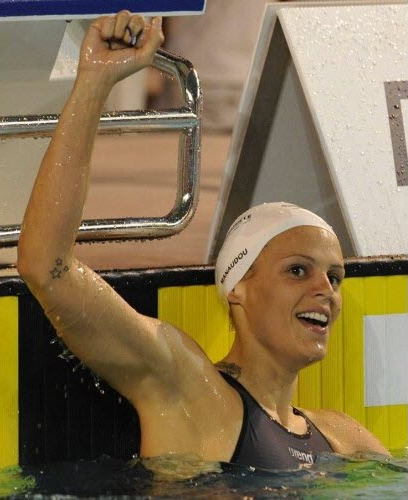
Laure Manaudou

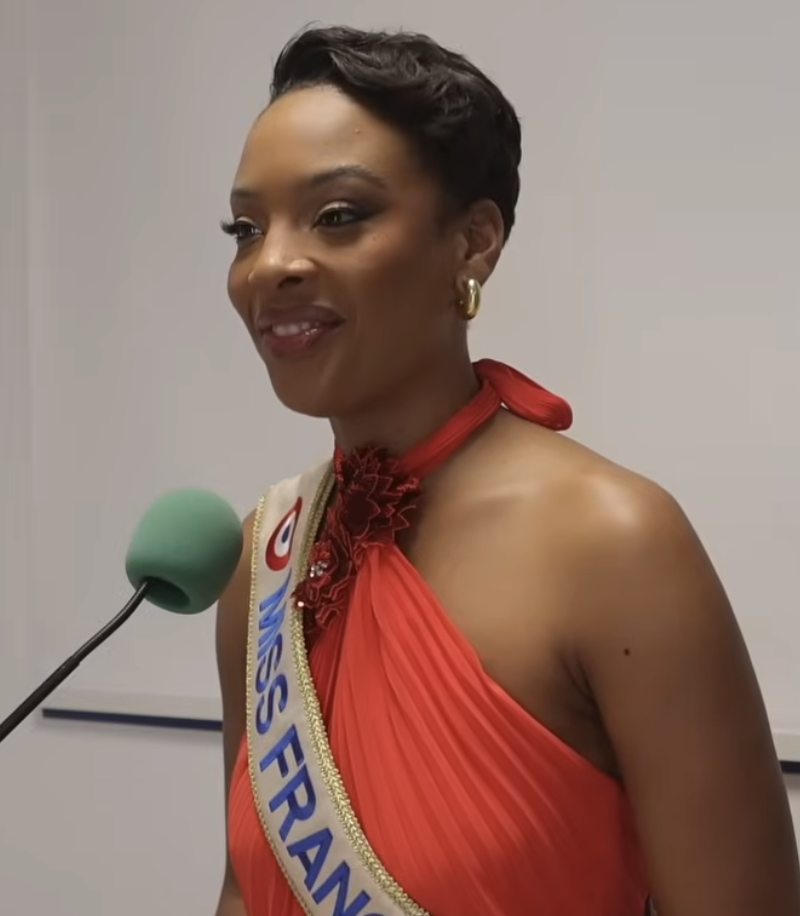
Angélique Angarni-Filopon

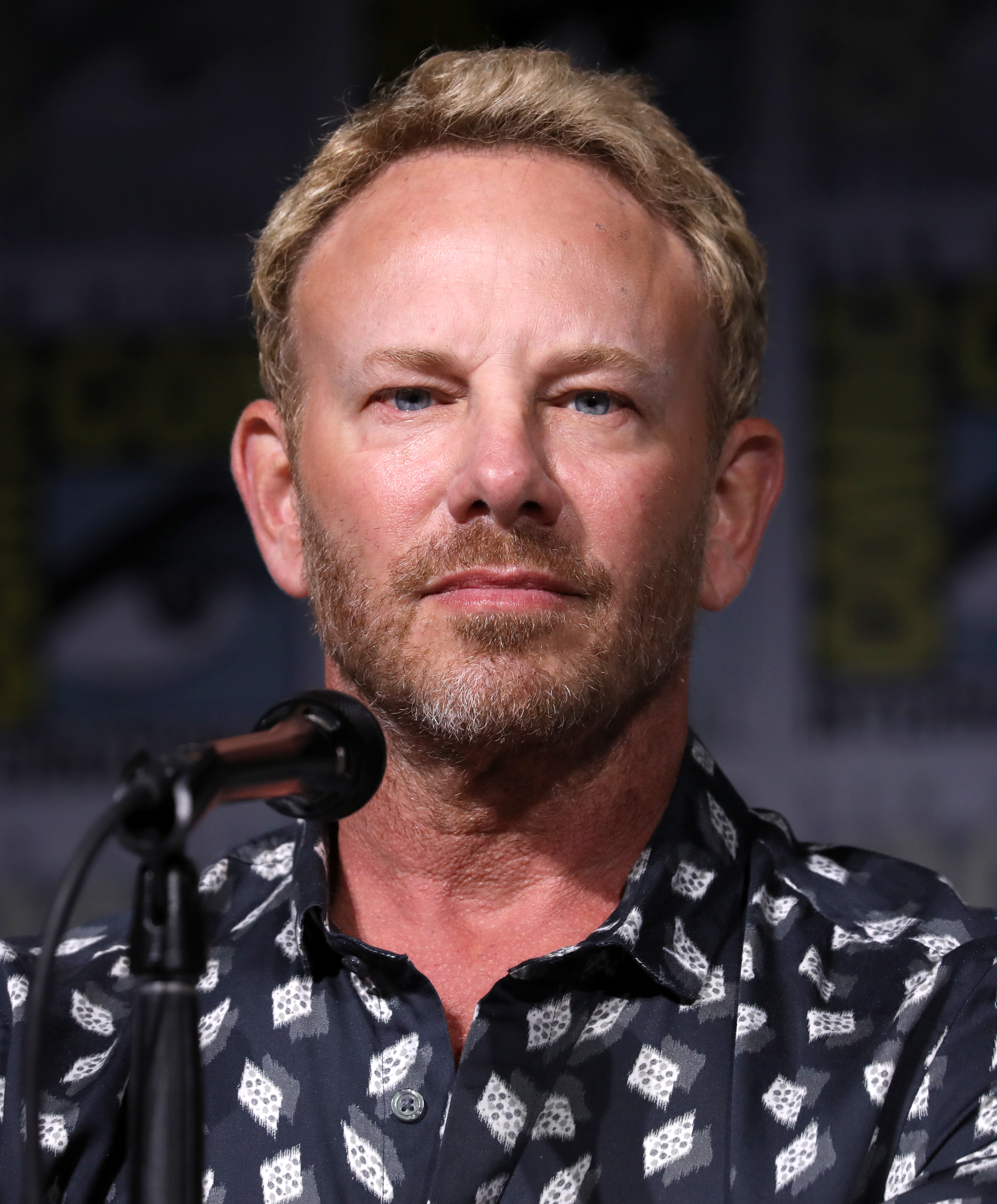
Ian Ziering

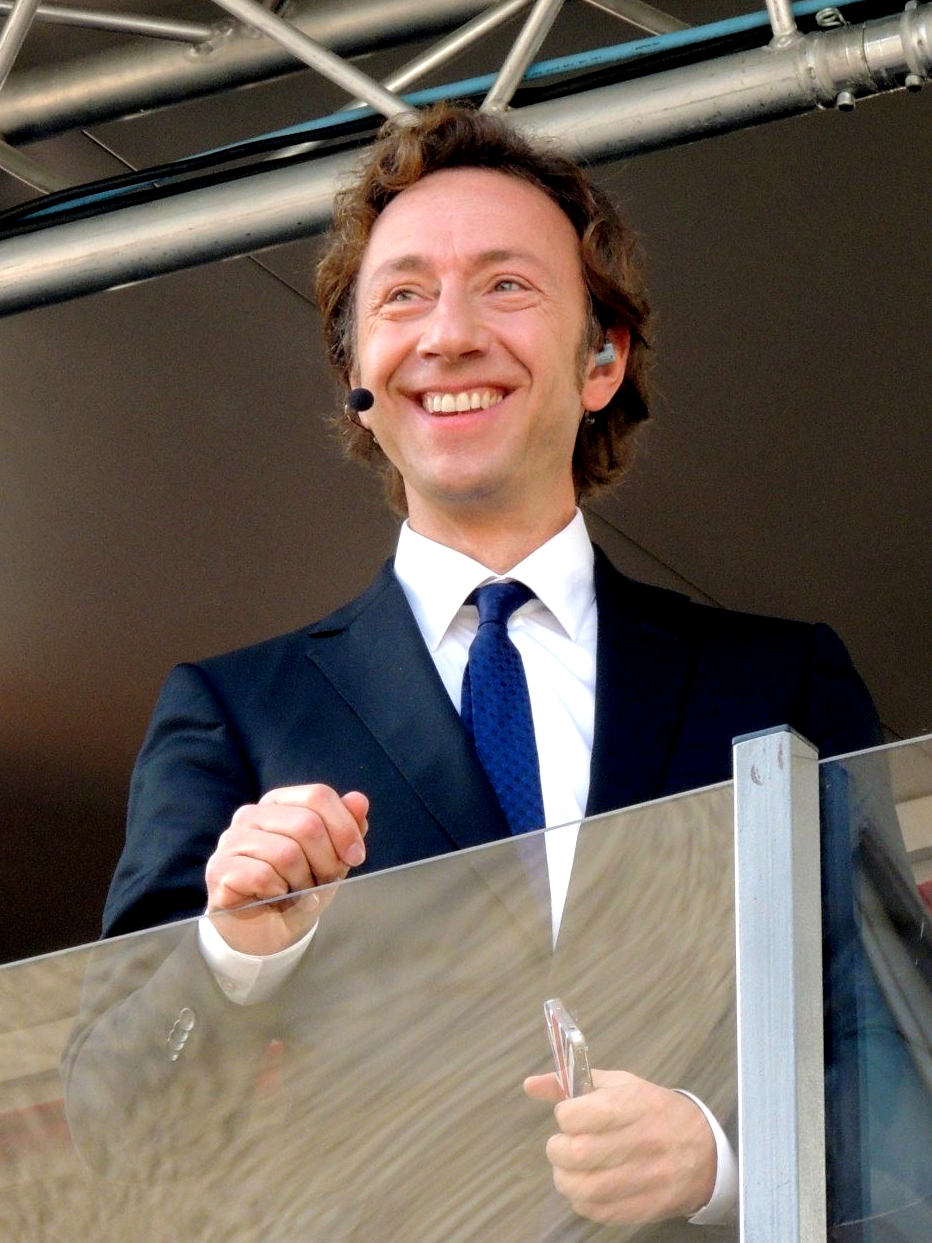
Stéphane Bern

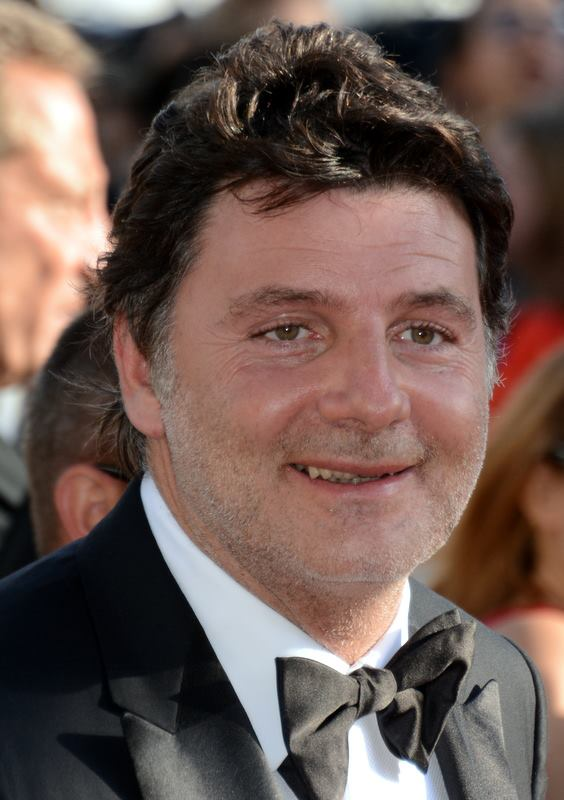
Philippe Lellouche

== Scoring ==
Couple	Place	1	2	3	1/2 + 3	4	5	6	7	8	9	10	11
Samuel & Ana	1	27 + 5 = 32		30	62	46	31	34	26	36	35	38 + 32 = 70	39 + 40 =79
Juju & Jordan	2	31 + 4 = 35		32	67	41	37	35	27	35	38	39 + 35 = 74	36 + 38 = 74
Emma & Dorian	3		30 + 4 = 34	31	65	37	33	35	24	30	34	35 + 29 = 64	33 + 36 = 69
Lucie & Christophe	4		29 + 3 = 32	32	64	42	33	33	24	28	/	32 + 33 = 65	
Maghla & Adrien	4		31 + 0 = 31	33	64	38	32	29	21	/	31	31	
Marcus & Marie	6		29 + 5 = 34	32	66	41	31	29	28	30	32		
Julien & Elsa	7	27 + 0 = 27		31	58	/	34	27	19	24			
Laure & Christian	8	23 + 0 = 23		26	49	32	28	/	18				
Angélique & Yann-Alrick	9	27 + 3 = 30		30	60	38	30	30					
Ian & Denitsa	10		27 + 0 = 27	26	53	35	25						
Stéphane & Calisson	11	23		24	47	29							
Philippe & Katrina	12		22	22	44								

Red numbers indicate couples with the lowest score for each week.
Blue numbers indicate couples with the highest score for each week.
indicates couples eliminated that week.
indicates the returning couple who finished in the bottom two or three.
indicates the winning couple.
indicates the runner-up couple.
indicates the third place couple.

=== Notes of each couples ===
Couple	Total	10	9	8	7	6	5	4	3	2	1	Average
Samuel & Ana	48	12	15	14	5	2	—N/a					8.63
Juju & Jordan	48	11	19	17	1	—N/a						8.83
Emma & Dorian	48	1	13	24	8	2	—N/a					8.06
Lucie & Christophe	36	—N/a	5	25	5	1	—N/a					7.94
Maghla & Adrien	32	—N/a	4	15	12	1	—N/a					7.69
Marcus & Marie	32	2	3	19	5	3	—N/a					7.88
Julien & Elsa	23	—N/a	2	5	9	6	1	—N/a				7.04
Laure & Christian	20	—N/a		1	8	8	3	—N/a				6.35
Angélique & Yann-Alrick	21	—N/a		9	11	1	—N/a					7.38
Ian & Denitsa	17	—N/a			12	4	1	—N/a				6.65
Stéphane & Calisson	13	—N/a			1	9	3	—N/a				5.85
Philippe & Katrina	8	—N/a				5	2	1	—N/a			5.50
Total	346	26	61	129	77	42	10	1	0	0	0	7.76

== Averages ==
This table only counts dances scored on the traditional 40-point scale.

Rank by average	Place	Couple	Total	Number of dances	Average
1	2	Juju & Jordan	416	12	35.42
2	1	Samuel & Ana	405	12	34.47
3	3	Emma & Dorian	379	12	32.25
4	4	Lucie & Christophe	286	9	31.78
5	6	Marcus & Marie	243	8	31.35
6	4	Maghla & Adrien	238	8	30.63
7	9	Angélique & Yann-Alrick	147	5	29.40
8	7	Julien & Elsa	162	6	28.06
9	10	Ian & Denitsa	106	4	26.50
10	8	Laure & Christian	120	5	25.20
11	11	Stéphane & Calisson	70	3	23.33
12	12	Philippe & Katrina	44	2	22.00

== Highest and lowest scoring performances ==
The best and worst dance performances according to the judges' marks were, out of 40 points:

Dance	Best dancer	Best score	Worst dancer	Worst score
Cha-Cha-Cha	Juju Fitcats; Samuel Bambi	35	Laure Manaudou	23
American Smooth	Lucie Bernardoni	33	Philippe Lellouche	22
Contemporary dance	Samuel Bambi	40	Laure Manaudou	25.6
Salsa	Emma	36	Ian Ziering	26
Samba	Samuel Bambi	40	Laure Manaudou; Julien Lieb	24
Argentine Tango	Julien Lieb; Samuel Bambi	34	Marcus	30
Tango	Juju Fitcats	38	Philippe Lellouche	22
Quickstep	Lucie Bernardoni	32	Stéphane Bern	23.2
Jazz Broadway	Emma	36	Emma	31
Rumba	Samuel Bambi	40	Julien Lieb	25.3
Waltz	Samuel Bambi	36.8	Julien Lieb	27
Jive	Marcus	37.3	Samuel Bambi	31
Paso Doble	Juju Fitcats	38	Marcus	29
Jazz	Juju Fitcats	38	Lucie Bernardoni	28
Bollywood	Emma	34	Emma	34
Foxtrot	Maghla	31	Maghla	31
Freestyle	Juju Fitcats; Samuel Bambi	39	Maghla	31
Medley	Samuel Bambi	40	Emma	36

== Couples' Highest and lowest scoring performances ==
According to the traditional 40-point scale:

Couple	Highest Scoring Dances	Lowest Scoring Dances
Samuel & Ana	Samba; Rumba; Contemporary (40)	Salsa (27)
Juju & Jordan	Freestyle (39)	Contemporary (31)
Emma & Dorian	Jazz Broadway; Salsa; Contemporary (36)	Cha-Cha-Cha (29)
Lucie & Christophe	Tango (33.6)	Jazz / Contemporary (28)
Maghla & Adrien	Contemporary (33)	Samba (28)
Marcus & Marie	Jive (37.3)	Quickstep; Paso Doble (29)
Julien & Elsa	Argentine Tango (34)	Samba (24)
Laure & Christian	Contemporary (28)	Cha-Cha-Cha (23)
Angélique & Yann-Alrick	Argentine Tango (30.4)	Cha-Cha-Cha (27)
Ian & Denitsa	Rumba (28)	Cha-Cha-Cha (25)
Stéphane & Calisson	Tango (24)	American Smooth (23)
Philippe & Katrina	Tango; American Smooth (22)	Tango; American Smooth (22)

== Weekly Scores ==
=== Week 1 ===
Individual judges scores in the chart below (given in parentheses) appeared in this order from left to right: Jean-Marc Généreux, Fauve Hautot, Mel Charlot, and Chris Marques.

Running order

Couple	Score	Style	Music	
Laure & Christian	23 (6,6,6,5)	Cha-Cha-Cha	Last Dance - Ariana DeBose, LaChanze & Storm Lever	
Julien & Elsa	27 (7,7,7,6)	American Smooth	Nous On Sait - Pierre Garnier	
Juju & Jordan	31 (8,8,8,7)	Contemporary	Versus - Slimane & Vitaa	
Stéphane & Calisson	23 (6,6,6,5)	American Smooth	Somebody To Love - Queen	
Angélique & Yann-Alrick	27 (7,7,7,6)	Cha-Cha-Cha	Feel Good - Charlotte Cardin	
Samuel & Ana	27 (6,7,7,7)	Salsa	Parisienne - Gims & La Mano 1.9	
Imposed Choreography
Samuel & Ana	+5	Flamenco	Un, Dos, Tres - Kendji Girac	32
Juju & Jordan	+4	Flamenco	Un, Dos, Tres - Kendji Girac	35
Angélique & Yann-Alrick	+3	Flamenco	Un, Dos, Tres - Kendji Girac	30
Julien & Elsa	+0	Flamenco	Un, Dos, Tres - Kendji Girac	27
Laure & Christian	+0	Flamenco	Un, Dos, Tres - Kendji Girac	23

=== Week 2 ===
Individual judges scores in the chart below (given in parentheses) appeared in this order from left to right: Jean-Marc Généreux, Fauve Hautot, Mel Charlot, and Chris Marques.

Emma & Dorian should have danced a contemporary on Chandelier by Sia but because of an injury they have changed the choreography to make a Cha-Cha-Cha on Dancing Queen by ABBA.

Running order

Couple	Score	Style	Music	
Lucie & Christophe	29 (7,7,8,7)	Cha-Cha-Cha	Lola - Superbus, Hoshi & Nicola Sirkis	
Ian & Denitsa	27 (7,7,7,6)	Samba	Azizam - Ed Sheeran	
Emma & Dorian	30 (8,7,8,7)	Cha-Cha-Cha	Dancing Queen - ABBA	
Maghla & Adrien	31 (8,8,8,7)	Argentine Tango	Balance Ton Quoi - Angèle	
Philippe & Katrina	22 (6,6,6,4)	Tango	L'assasymphonie - Mozart, l'opéra rock	
Marcus & Marie	29 (6,8,8,7)	Quickstep	Single Ladies (Put A Ring On It) - Beyoncé	
Imposed Choreography
Marcus & Marie	+5	Salsa	Hips Don't Lie - Shakira & Wyclef Jean	34
Emma & Dorian	+4	Salsa	Hips Don't Lie - Shakira & Wyclef Jean	34
Lucie & Christophe	+3	Salsa	Hips Don't Lie - Shakira & Wyclef Jean	32
Maghla & Adrien	+0	Salsa	Hips Don't Lie - Shakira & Wyclef Jean	31
Ian & Denitsa	+0	Salsa	Hips Don't Lie - Shakira & Wyclef Jean	27

=== Week 3 : Personal Story Week ===
Individual judges scores in the chart below (given in parentheses) appeared in this order from left to right: Jean-Marc Généreux, Fauve Hautot, Mel Charlot, and Chris Marques.

Running order

Couple	Score	Style	Music	Result
Emma & Dorian	31 (8,8,8,7)	Jazz Broadway	This Is Me - Keala Settle	Safe
Laure & Christian	26 (7,7,7,5)	American Smooth	The Winner Takes It All - Mamma Mia!	Bottom 2
Julien & Elsa	31 (8,8,8,7)	Contemporary	Si seulement je pouvais lui manquer - Calogero	Safe
Ian & Denitsa	26 (7,6,7,6)	Salsa	(I've Had) The Time of My Life - Bill Medley & Jennifer Warnes	Safe
Juju & Jordan	32 (8,8,8,8)	Rumba	Shallow - Lady Gaga and Bradley Cooper	Safe
Stéphane & Calisson	24 (7,6,6,5)	Tango	Être à la Hauteur - Le Roi Soleil	Safe
Lucie & Christophe	32 (8,8,8,8)	Contemporary	SOS d'un terrien en détresse - Grégory Lemarchal	Safe
Samuel & Ana	30 (7,8,8,7)	Samba	I Want You Back - The Jackson 5	Safe
Marcus & Marie	32 (8,8,9,7)	Cha-Cha-Cha	Grace Kelly - Mika	Safe
Maghla & Adrien	33 (8,8,9,8)	Contemporary	Respire Fort - Jeanne Viard	Safe
Angélique & Yann-Alrick	30 (8,7,8,7)	Samba	Fashion Designa - Theodora	Safe
Philippe & Katrina	22 (5,6,6,5)	American Smooth	Longtemps - Amir Haddad	Bottom 2
Face to face
Laure & Christian		Paso Doble	Survivor - Destiny's Child	Safe
Philippe & Katrina		Paso Doble	Survivor - Destiny's Child	Eliminated

=== Week 4 : Guest judge Week ===
Individual judges scores in the chart below (given in parentheses) appeared in this order from left to right: Jean-Marc Généreux, Fauve Hautot, Mel Charlot, Chris Marques and Malika Benjelloun.

This week, a 5th judge is added to the 4 usual jury-members.

Julien Lieb & Elsa Bois were supposed to perform but, Julien got injured and was unable to perform.

Running order

Couple	Score	Style	Music	Result
Emma & Dorian	37 (8,7,8,6,8)	Rumba	M'Envoler - Carla Lazzari & Jeck	Safe
Lucie & Christophe	42 (8,8,9,8,9)	Tango	Flamme - Juliette Armanet	Safe
Laure & Christian	32 (7,6,7,5,7)	Rumba / Contemporary	Puis T’as Dansé Avec Moi - Hoshi	Safe
Ian & Denitsa	35 (7,7,7,7,7)	Rumba	I Want It That Way - Backstreet Boys	Safe
Julien & Elsa	/	/	/	Safe
Juju & Jordan	41 (9,8,8,8,8)	Samba	Toutes les femmes de ta vie - L5	Safe
Stéphane & Calisson	29 (6,6,6,5,6)	Quickstep	I'm Still Standing – Elton John	Eliminated
Marcus & Marie	41 (8,8,8,8,9)	Contemporary	Casting - Christophe Maé	Bottom 2
Maghla & Adrien	38 (8,7,8,7,8)	Cha-Cha-Cha	Tant Pis Pour Elle - Charlotte Cardin	Safe
Angélique & Yann-Alrick	38 (7,8,8,7,8)	Argentine Tango	Gabriela - Katseye	Safe
Samuel & Ana	46 (9,10,10,8,9)	Waltz	You Don't Own Me - Grace & G-Eazy	Safe
Face to face
Marcus & Marie		Salsa	I Just Might - Bruno Mars	Safe
Stéphane & Calisson		Salsa	I Just Might - Bruno Mars	Eliminated

=== Week 5 : Mystery guest week ===
Individual judges scores in the chart below (given in parentheses) appeared in this order from left to right: Jean-Marc Généreux, Fauve Hautot, Mel Charlot and Chris Marques.

Running order

Couple	Guest(s)	Score	Style	Music	Result
Laure & Christian	Florent Manaudou	28 (8,7,7,6)	Contemporary	Pull Marine – Isabelle Adjani	Safe
Emma & Dorian	Carole & Sylvain (Emma's parents)	33 (9,8,9,7)	Tango	Mauvais Garçon - Helena	Safe
Julien & Elsa	Roman Doduik	34 (9,9,8,8)	Argentine Tango	Moi... Lolita - Julien Doré	Safe
Ian & Denitsa	Pavel (Denitsa's brother)	25 (7,6,7,5)	Cha-Cha-Cha	Spider - Gims & DYSTINCT	Eliminated
Lucie & Christophe	Magalie, (Lucie's sister) & Mayane-Sarah El Baze	33 (8,8,9,8)	American Smooth	Lucie - Pascal Obispo	Safe
Samuel & Ana	Stéphane Bern	31 (8,8,9,6)	Jive	Footloose - Kenny Loggins	Bottom 2
Juju & Jordan	Suzane	37 (9,10,10,8)	Tango	Virile - Suzane	Safe
Angélique & Yann-Alrick	Jonathan Jenvrin	30 (7,8,8,7)	Salsa	Who Do You Think You Are - Spice Girls	Safe
Maghla & Adrien	Anyme	32 (8,9,9,6)	Rumba	Ils Me Rient Tous Au Nez - Theodora	Safe
Marcus & Marie	Bilal Hassani	31 (8,8,8,7)	Rumba / Contemporary	Rise Like a Phoenix - Conchita Wurst	Safe
Face to face
Samuel & Ana			Salsa	No Stress - Aya Nakamura	Safe
Ian & Denitsa			Salsa	No Stress - Aya Nakamura	Eliminated

=== Week 6 : Friday the 13th week ===
Individual judges scores in the chart below (given in parentheses) appeared in this order from left to right: Jean-Marc Généreux, Fauve Hautot, Mel Charlot and Chris Marques.

Laure Manaudou & Christian Millette were supposed to perform but, Laure got injured and was unable to perform.

Running order

Couple	Score	Style	Music	Result
Julien & Elsa	27 (6,7,7,7)	Waltz	A Thousand Years - Christina Perri	Bottom 2
Emma & Dorian	35 (9,9,9,8)	Contemporary	Particule - Miki	Safe
Juju & Jordan	35 (8,10,9,8)	Cha-Cha-Cha	The Dead Dance - Lady Gaga	Safe
Samuel & Ana	34 (8,9,9,8)	Argentine Tango	Cry Me a River - Justin Timberlake	Safe
Lucie & Christophe	33 (8,8,9,8)	Rumba	Nuit magique - Mathilde & Francœur	Safe
Laure & Christian	/	/	/	Safe
Marcus & Marie	29 (8,7,8,6)	Paso-Doble	Abracadabra - Lady Gaga	Safe
Maghla & Adrien	29 (7,7,8,7)	American Smooth	Boule Au Ventre - Helena	Safe
Angélique & Yann-Alrick	30 (7,8,8,7)	Paso-Doble	Like a Prayer - Madonna	Eliminated
Face to face
Julien & Elsa		Freestyle	Murder on the Dancefloor - Sophie Ellis-Bextor	Safe
Angélique & Yann-Alrick		Freestyle	Murder on the Dancefloor - Sophie Ellis-Bextor	Eliminated

=== Week 7 : Battle of the judges week ===
Individual judges scores in the chart below (given in parentheses) appeared in this order from left to right: Jean-Marc Généreux, Fauve Hautot, Mel Charlot and Chris Marques.

Each couples dance in trio with one of the judge.

Running order

Couple	Judge	Score	Style	Music	Result
Laure & Christian	Chris Marques	18 (6,6,6,X)	Samba	Espresso - Sabrina Carpenter	Eliminated
Emma & Dorian	Mel Charlot	24 (8,8,X,8)	Salsa	Zoo - Shakira	Bottom 3
Julien & Elsa	Fauve Hautot	19 (6,X,7,6)	Rumba	Ensemble - Aliocha Schneider & Charlotte Cardin	Safe
Lucie & Christophe	Jean-Marc Généreux	24 (X,8,8,8)	Quickstep	You're the One That I Want - John Travolta & Olivia Newton-John	Safe
Samuel & Ana	Fauve Hautot	26 (8,X,9,9)	Contemporary	Formidable - Stromae	Safe
Marcus & Marie	Jean-Marc Généreux	28 (X,10,10,8)	Jive	Proud Mary - Tina Turner & Ike Turner	Safe
Juju & Jordan	Chris Marques	27 (9,9,9,X)	Jive	J'irai où tu iras – Céline Dion & Jean-Jacques Goldman	Safe
Maghla & Adrien	Mel Charlot	21 (7,7,X,7)	Samba	Tití Me Preguntó - Bad Bunny	Bottom 3
Face to face
Emma & Dorian			Tango	The Fate of Ophelia - Taylor Swift	Safe
Maghla & Adrien			Tango	The Fate of Ophelia - Taylor Swift	Safe
Laure & Christian			Tango	The Fate of Ophelia - Taylor Swift	Eliminated

=== Week 8 : 15 Years Week ===
Individual judges scores in the chart below (given in parentheses) appeared in this order from left to right: Jean-Marc Généreux, Fauve Hautot, Mel Charlot and Chris Marques.

To celebrate the 15 years of the show, some previous iconic couple of the show come back to dance:

• Amel Bent & Christophe Licata (Season 3 finalists)
• Alizée & Grégoire Lyonnet (Season 4 winners)
• Loïc Nottet & Denitsa Ikonomova (Season 6 winners)
• Bilal Hassani & Jordan Mouillerac (Season 11 finalists)
• Florent Manaudou & Elsa Bois (Season 14 finalists)

Maghla & Adrien Caby were supposed to perform but, Maghla got injured and was unable to perform.

Running order

Couple	Score	Style	Music	Result
Emma & Dorian	30 (8,8,8,6)	Paso Doble	Soirée Mondaine - Oria	Bottom 2
Julien & Elsa	24 (6,6,7,5)	Samba	Despacito - Luis Fonsi Ft Daddy Yankee	Eliminated
Lucie & Christophe	28 (8,7,7,6)	Jazz / Contemporary	Roar - Katy Perry	Safe
Juju & Jordan	35 (9,9,9,8)	Paso Doble	Berghain - Rosalía, Björk & Yves Tumor	Safe
Samuel & Ana	36 (8,9,10,9)	Rumba	Risk It All - Bruno Mars	Safe
Maghla & Adrien	/	/	/	Safe
Marcus & Marie	30 (9,8,7,6)	Argentine Tango	...Baby One More Time - Miriam-Teak Lee	Safe
Face to face
Emma & Dorian		Cha-Cha-Cha	You Should Be Dancing - Bee Gees	Safe
Julien & Elsa		Cha-Cha-Cha	You Should Be Dancing - Bee Gees	Eliminated

=== Week 9 : The troupes ===
Individual judges scores in the chart below (given in parentheses) appeared in this order from left to right: Jean-Marc Généreux, Fauve Hautot, Mel Charlot and Chris Marques.

Each couple will be accompanied by a dance troupe for their routine.

Lucie Bernardoni & Christophe Licata were supposed to perform but, Lucie was unable to perform.

Running order

Couple	Troupe	Score	Style	Music	Result
Lucie & Christophe	/	/	/	/	Safe
Emma & Dorian	Sri Desi Dance	34 (9,8,9,8)	Bollywood	Sapphire - Ed Sheeran	Safe
Juju & Jordan	Tataki Company	38 (9,10,10,9)	Jazz / Contemporary	Elastic Heart - Sia	Safe
Samuel & Ana	Paradis Latin	35 (9,9,9,8)	Cha-Cha-Cha	Can't Stop the Feeling! - Justin Timberlake	Safe
Marcus & Marie	MagicLab	32 (8,8,8,8)	American Smooth	Roi - Bilal Hassani	Bottom 2
Maghla & Adrien	GAM Compagnie	31 (9,7,8,7)	Fox-Trot	I Wanna Dance with Somebody (Who Loves Me) - Calum Scott & Whitney Houston	Bottom 2
Face to face
Maghla & Adrien			Cha-Cha-Cha	Voulez-Vous - ABBA	Safe
Marcus & Marie			Cha-Cha-Cha	Voulez-Vous - ABBA	Eliminated

=== Week 10 : Semi-Final ===
Individual judges scores in the chart below (given in parentheses) appeared in this order from left to right: Individual judges scores in the chart below (given in parentheses) appeared in this order from left to right: Jean-Marc Généreux, Fauve Hautot, Mel Charlot, and Chris Marques.

On the first dance, every couple dance a freestyle on a song chose by the contestant.

On the second dance, each couple will discover their routine, the music, the costumes, the scenography approximatively 1mn45 before the dance.

Running order

Couple	Score	Total	Style	Music	Result
Emma & Dorian	35 (9,9,9,8)	64	Freestyle	Chandelier - Sia	Safe
Emma & Dorian	29 (7,7,8,7)	64	Cha-Cha-Cha	Hush Hush; Hush Hush, - The Pussycat Dolls	Safe
Lucie & Christophe	32 (8,8,8,8)	65	Freestyle	All That Jazz - Catherine Zeta-Jones & Renée Zellweger	Eliminated
Lucie & Christophe	33 (8,8,9,8)	65	Rumba	Pour que tu m'aimes encore - Céline Dion	Eliminated
Samuel & Ana	38 (9,10,10,9)	70	Freestyle	Wanna Be Startin' Somethin' – Michael Jackson	Safe
Samuel & Ana	32 (8,8,8,8)	70	Waltz	Lose Control - Teddy Swims	Safe
Juju & Jordan	39 (10,10,10,9)	74	Freestyle	Corps - Yseult	Bottom 3
Juju & Jordan	35 (9,9,9,8)	74	Cha-Cha-Cha	Firework - Katy Perry	Bottom 3
Maghla & Adrien	31 (8,8,8,7)	31	Freestyle	En Boucle - Adèle Castillon & Zamdane	Eliminated
Maghla & Adrien	/	31	/	/	Eliminated
Face to face
Juju & Jordan			Salsa	Lush Life - Zara Larsson	Safe
Lucie & Christophe			Salsa	Lush Life - Zara Larsson	Eliminated
Maghla & Adrien			Salsa	Lush Life - Zara Larsson	Eliminated

=== Week 11 : Final ===
Individual judges scores in the chart below (given in parentheses) appeared in this order from left to right: Jean-Marc Généreux, Fauve Hautot, Mel Charlot, and Chris Marques.

In the first round, each couple dance a Freestyle.

In the second round, each couple dance a medley of 3 dances they previously made.

Running order

Couple	Score	Total	Style	Music	Result
Emma & Dorian	33 (9,8,8,8)	69	Freestyle	Regarde! - Monroe	3rd Place
Emma & Dorian	36 (10,9,9,8)	69	Jazz Broadway + Salsa + Contemporary	This Is Me - Keala Settle + Zoo - Shakira + Particule - Miki	3rd Place
Juju & Jordan	36 (10,9,9,8)	74	Freestyle	Let's Get Loud - Jennifer Lopez	2nd Place
Juju & Jordan	38 (9,10,10,9)	74	Rumba + Tango + Paso Doble	Shallow - Lady Gaga and Bradley Cooper + Virile - Suzane + Berghain - Rosalía, Björk & Yves Tumor	2nd Place
Samuel & Ana	39 (10,10,10,9)	79	Freestyle	Caruso - Luciano Pavarotti	Winner
Samuel & Ana	40 (10,10,10,10)	79	Samba + Rumba + Contemporary	I Want You Back - The Jackson 5 + Risk It All - Bruno Mars + Formidable - Stromae	Winner
The Last Dance
Samuel & Ana	53%		American Smooth	Next Summer - Damiano David	
Juju & Jordan	47%		American Smooth	All by Myself – Céline Dion	

== Dance Chart ==
Couple	1		2		3	4	5	6	7	8	9	10		11		
Samuel & Ana	Salsa	Flamenco	-	-	Samba	Waltz	Jive	Argentine Tango	Contemporary	Rumba	Cha-Cha-Cha	Freestyle	Waltz	Freestyle	Samba / Contemporary / Rumba	American Smooth
Juju & Jordan	Contemporary	Flamenco	-	-	Rumba	Samba	Tango	Cha-Cha-Cha	Jive	Paso Doble	Jazz / Contemporary	Freestyle	Cha-Cha-Cha	Freestyle	Rumba / Tango / Paso Doble	American Smooth
Emma & Dorian	-	-	Cha-Cha-Cha	Salsa	Jazz Broadway	Rumba	Tango	Contemporary	Salsa	Paso Doble	Bollywood	Freestyle	Cha-Cha-Cha	Freestyle	Jazz Broadway / Contemporary / Salsa	
Lucie & Christophe	-	-	Cha-Cha-Cha	Salsa	Contemporary	Tango	American Smooth	Rumba	Quickstep	Jazz	~~Samba~~	Freestyle	Rumba			
Maghla & Adrien	-	-	Argentine Tango	Salsa	Contemporary	Cha-Cha-Cha	Rumba	American Smooth	Samba	~~Paso Doble~~	Foxtrot	Freestyle				
Marcus & Marie	-	-	Quickstep	Salsa	Cha-Cha-Cha	Contemporary	Rumba / Contemporary	Paso-Doble	Jive	Argentine Tango	American Smooth					
Julien & Elsa	American Smooth	Flamenco	-	-	Contemporary	~~Quickstep~~	Argentine Tango	Waltz	Rumba	Samba						
Laure & Christian	Cha-Cha-Cha	Flamenco	-	-	American Smooth	Rumba / Contemporary	Contemporary	~~Argentine Tango~~	Samba							
Angélique & Yann-Alrick	Cha-Cha-Cha	Flamenco	-	-	Samba	Argentine Tango	Salsa	Paso-Doble								
Ian & Denitsa	-	-	Samba	Salsa	Salsa	Rumba	Cha-Cha-Cha									
Stéphane & Calisson	American Smooth	-	-	-	Tango	Quickstep										
Philippe & Katrina	-	-	Tango	-	American Smooth											

Highest scoring dance
Lowest scoring dance
Danced, but not scored

== Things to know ==
- Ian Ziering has already participated in the American version in 2007 where he reached the semi-final.
- Laure Manaudou is the sister of Florent Manaudou who reached the final in Season 14 in 2025.
- Four dancers of Season 14 didn't get back this year:
  - Candice Pascal (dancer since season 1) didn't participate for the first time ever
  - Inès Vandamme (dancer since season 10)
  - Nicolas Archambault (dancer since season 13)
  - Nino Mosa (dancer since season 14)
- Three dancers made their return this year:
  - Christian Millette (who participated for the last time in season 13)
  - Denitsa Ikonomova (dancer from season 3 to 10)
  - Marie Denigot (dancer from season 7 to 9)
- One dancer made its debut this year:
  - Dorian Rollin
