= Peter Deary =

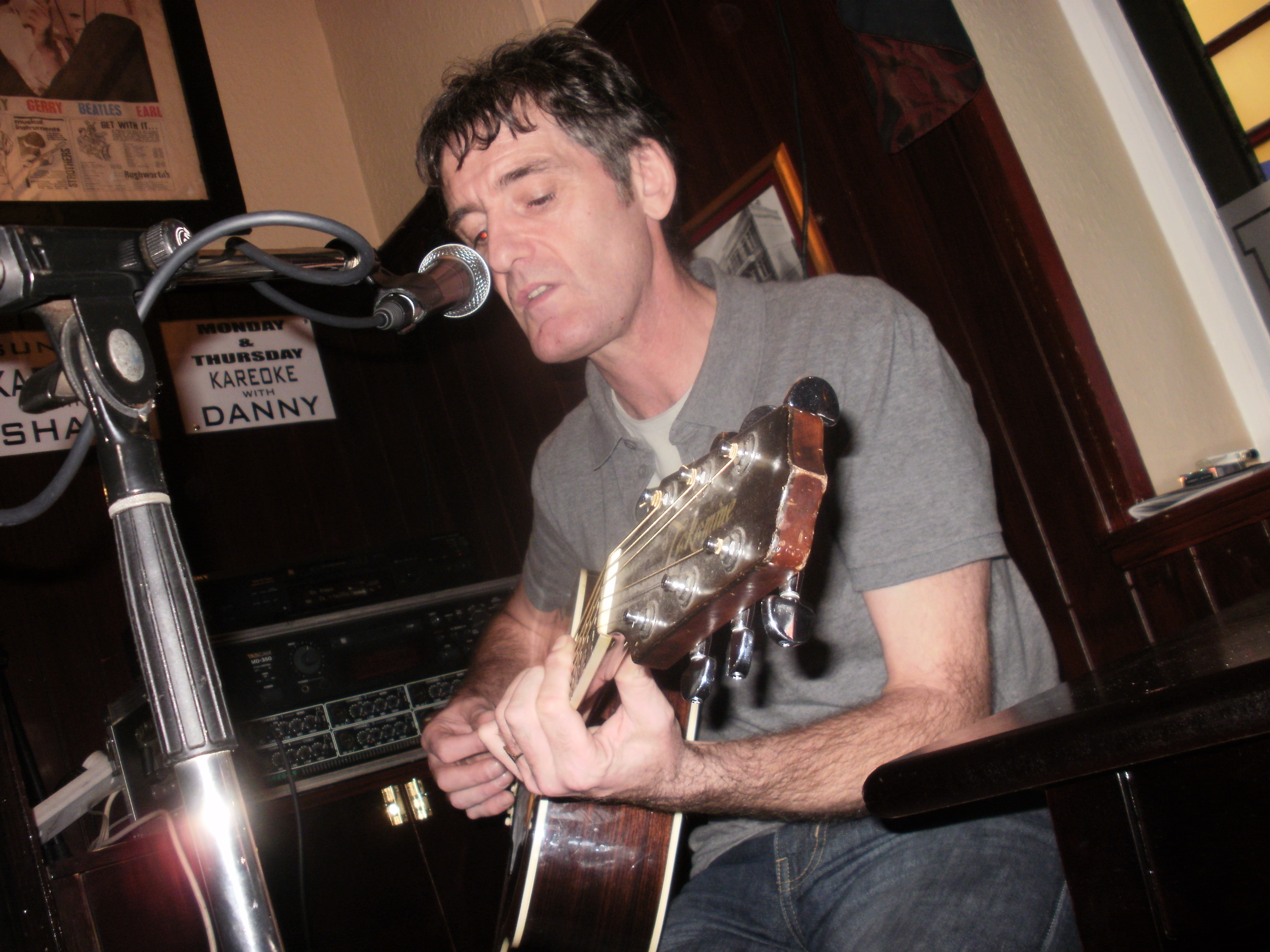

Background information
- Also known as: Digsy
- Born: Early 1960s Liverpool, England
- Genres: New wave, alternative rock
- Occupations: Musician, songwriter
- Instruments: Guitar, vocals
- Years active: Late 1970s–present

Peter Deary is an English musician and singer-songwriter.

He was lead singer for 1980s band Cook da Books, went on to front Small, and then Smaller, who had two hit singles in the mid-1990s, and is now in The Sums. He has enjoyed a long friendship with Noel Gallagher, who guested on several tracks by Smaller. He was also the inspiration for the Oasis song "Digsy's Dinner" on their album Definitely Maybe, and was mentioned in the lyric to "Be Here Now" ("Your shit jokes remind me of Digsy's").
