= Fabienne Égal =

French announcer and television host

Fabienne Égal (born 21 July 1954 in Rabat, Morocco) is a French announcer and television host.

== Career ==
She became an announcer on TF1 in the 1970s, then hosted Les pieds au mur with Nicolas Hulot in 1980 and La Une chez vous (1985-1987). She became famous presenting TV show Tournez manège from 1985 to 1993, alongside Evelyne Leclercq and Simone Garnier. When the show was no longer broadcast, she hosted Double mixte and Doublé gagnant on RTL 9, then Jeux sans frontières with Nelson Monfort on France 2. She also participated as a guest star in the TV series Pas de pitié pour les croissants ! She started working as a television announcer on TF1 in 1976, after answering a classified ad in Télé 7 Jours and being selected from among 2,600 candidates.

== TV shows ==
- Les pieds au mur, 1980
- La Une chez vous, 1985-1987
- Tournez manège, 1985-1993
- Double mixte and Doublé gagnant, RTL 9
- Jeux sans frontières, 1999
