= Cook da Books =

British new wave band

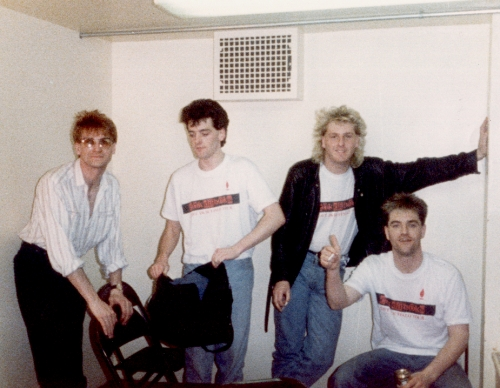
- Cook Da Books backstage at DAR Constitution Hall, Washington D.C. 1985

Background information
- Also known as: Cook the Books; Big in France; Da Books
- Origin: Fazakerley, Liverpool, England
- Genres: New wave, synthpop
- Years active: 1980–1988
- Labels: 10, Carrere, Kiteland Records
- Members: Owen Moran; Peter Deary; Tony Prescott; John Legget

Cook da Books (also known as Cook the Books, Big in France and Da Books) were a British new wave band from Liverpool, England, formed in 1980. The band were signed to indie labels throughout their career, and much of their music was politically charged, though they also contributed music to popular film soundtracks. They released two albums and eleven singles before splitting up in 1988.

== History ==
Cook da Books formed in 1980 in Fazakerley, Liverpool composed of former members of pub/cabaret circuit groups The Dogems and Brooklyn, two bands not connected with the city's punk and new wave scene, but competent musicians with close harmonies gained from the Hilda Fallon Roadshow days, similar to other local bands such as Our Kid. The initial line-up was Kevin Kunky Kelly (Guitar/vocals) Peter "Digsy" Deary (vocals, guitar), Owen Moran (bass, vocals), Tony Prescott (keyboards), and John Legget (drums).

They initially gained attention with their acclaimed and politically charged debut single "Piggie in the Middle 8", with provocative lyrics about the Toxteth riots. The band's manager played a demo to well-known reggae producer Dennis Bovell, who had recently produced a number two record with Janet Kay's "Silly Games", upon which he agreed to produce the track at his Studio80 in London. A further deal was reached with Probe Records to release the record in the emerging independent market. This was the first record ever released on the Probe label, which went on to find success with many other artists following this release. Local photographer John Stoddart was enlisted to produce the artwork for the 7" & 12" sleeves. After this first band session, Stoddart went on to photograph many bands, most notably Frankie Goes to Hollywood through their major success.

The single brought them to the attention of musician Vladimir Cosma, who included three tracks by the band on the soundtrack to the French film La Boum 2. Several scenes in the movie are set during a Cook da Books live show, culminating with the band performing "Your Eyes", which was a hit in Europe, Hong Kong, and the Philippines, selling over 900,000 copies and earning the band a gold disc. It brought the band international recognition, while remaining relatively unknown in their home country and the United States. There followed further live shows including high-profile supporting tours in the UK and USA with Men at Work, Joan Armatrading and the Undertones, among others. They established a recording and rehearsal space in central Liverpool during the Virgin records deal. However, following the demise of the deal their manager, John Smith sold this on to another Liverpool band, Echo & the Bunnymen.

The band recorded two further sessions (in 1983 and 1984) for John Peel's BBC Radio 1 show, and one for Simon Bates. They appeared on the BBC TV show Whistle Test in 1985. In 1984, they contributed the demo version of "Piggy In The Middle 8" to Ronnie Flood's Jobs For the Boys compilation album, released to highlight the lack of employment available in Thatcher's Britain, particularly Liverpool.

Though the soundtrack to La Boum 2 was released on Polymer Records, and they were also signed to 10 Records (part of Virgin Records), Cook Da Books remained fiercely independent throughout their career, running their own label, Kiteland Records. According to the band themselves in an interview with Explicit magazine in 1983: "Being independent means that we've got the freedom to choose whatever we want, have whatever product we want marketed when we want".

In 1985, they sang the song "Spartakus", written by Cosma, for the soundtrack of the French sci-fi cartoon TV Les Mondes Engloutis (Spartakus and the Sun Beneath the Sea). That year they performed a concert with Joan Armatrading at the Gammage Performing Arts Center in Arizona.

After Prescott's departure, the remaining three members became simply 'Da Books', and re-emerged a year later with a cover of Stevie Wonder's "Living for the City", released on Probe Plus. They also recorded "The Lookout Is Out" with new lyrics (based on the melody of "Asterix est là" by Plastic Bertrand), the theme song for the 1986 animated film Asterix in Britain.

Singer/guitarist Peter "Digsy" Deary went on to front Smaller, featuring his brother Stephen on drums, which had UK hit singles in 1996 and 1997 with "Wasted" and "Is", and was celebrated in the Oasis song "Digsy's Dinner" from their debut album Definitely Maybe. Oasis's Noel Gallagher was also a guest on Smaller's 1997 album Badly Badly. He then fronted The Sums in the 2000s.

In 2012, Digsy and Owen were the subject of a documentary entitled We Wouldn't Want to Knock It by Liverpool filmmakers Daniel Draper and Frankie Cowley.

== Style ==
The band were compared to Duran Duran, U2, and Squeeze.

== Discography ==
=== Albums ===
- 1983: Outch
- 1989: Big Dreams (as Da' Books)

=== Singles/EPs ===
Chart placings shown are from the UK Indie Chart.

- 1982: "Piggie in the Middle Eight"/"Turn to Black" (No. 18)
- 1982: "Rich Men Don't"/"Low Profile"
- 1983: "Piggie in the Middle Eight"/"I Wouldn't Want to Knock It"
- 1983: "Your Eyes" (No. 1)
- 1983: "Low Profile"/"Rich Men Don't" (No. 13)
- 1983: "I Wouldn't Want to Knock It"/"Up in Smoke"/"In da Papers" (No. 20)
- 1984: "Caress Me Like a Flower"/"Say Something Good"
- 1984: "Golden Age"/"Soho"
- 1985: "You Hurt Me Deep Inside"/"Piggie in the Middle Eight"/"Low Profile"
- 1986: "Living for the City"/"All I Want is Everything"/"How Could You Be So Low"/"Giving Up the Acid"/"England May as Well Be Cuba"
- 1986: "The Lookout Is Out" (theme song for the animated film Asterix in Britain)

=== Compilation appearances ===
- "This Is Not the Time" (included on Crackin' Up at the Pyramid compilation) (May 1982)
- "Get It Together"/"Your Eyes"/"Silver Man" (included on La Boum 2 soundtrack LP) (France: Philips, Germany: Carrere)
- "Piggie in the Middle Eight" (new version) (Jobs for the Boys compilation (Natalie Records) (January 1985)
