= La Boum 2 =

- Theatrical release poster
- Directed by: Claude Pinoteau
- Screenplay by: Danièle Thompson; Claude Pinoteau
- Dialogue by: Danièle Thompson
- Produced by: Marcel Dassault; Alain Poiré
- Starring: Sophie Marceau; Claude Brasseur; Brigitte Fossey
- Cinematography: Edmond Séchan
- Edited by: Marie-Josèphe Yoyotte
- Music by: Vladimir Cosma
- Production company: Gaumont
- Distributed by: Gaumont Distribution
- Release date: 8 December 1982 (France)
- Running time: 109 minutes
- Country: France
- Language: French
- Box office: $30.5 million

La Boum 2 is a 1982 French teen romantic comedy film directed by Claude Pinoteau and starring Claude Brasseur, Brigitte Fossey, and Sophie Marceau. Written by Danièle Thompson and Claude Pinoteau, the film is about a girl who falls in love with a boy and must deal with the question of making love for the first time. La Boum 2 is the sequel to 1980's La Boum (The Party). The music group Cook da Books became famous in many countries through their soundtrack song "Your Eyes". Like its predecessor, La Boum 2 was a financial success, earning 4,071,600 admissions in France. In 1983, the film received the César Award for Most Promising Actress (Sophie Marceau), and was nominated for Best Music (Vladimir Cosma) and Best Supporting Actress (Denise Grey).

== Plot ==
Fifteen-year-old Vic (Sophie Marceau) has no boyfriend. Her parents are happily together again, and her great-grandmother Poupette (Denise Grey) thinks about finally marrying her long-term boyfriend. Vic meets Philippe (Pierre Cosso) and is overcome by his charm. She considers having sex with him – a step that her girlfriend Penelope (Sheila O'Connor) already has taken.

== Cast ==
- Sophie Marceau as Victoire "Vic" Beretton
- Claude Brasseur as François Beretton
- Brigitte Fossey as Françoise Beretton
- Denise Grey as Poupette, Great-Grandmother
- Pierre Cosso as Philippe Berthier
- Lambert Wilson as Félix Maréchal
- Alexandre Sterling as Mathieu
- Sheila O'Connor as Pénélope Fontanet
- Alexandra Gonin as Samantha Fontanet
- Jean-Philippe Léonard as Stéphane
- Jean Leuvrais as Portal
- Claudia Morin as Mme Fontanet
- Daniel Russo as Etienne
- Zabou Breitman as Catherine

== Production ==
=== Soundtrack ===
1. "Your Eyes" (Cosma-Jordan) by Cook da Books – 4:38
2. "I Can't Swim" (Cosma-Harvest) by Paul Hudson – 2:25
3. "Get It Together" (Cosma-Jordan) by Cook da Books – 3:35
4. "Disillusion" (instrumental) (Cosma) by King Harvest Group – 4:06
5. "Maybe You're Wrong" (Cosma-Jordan-Harvest) by Freddie Meyer & King Harvest Group – 3:25
6. "Silverman" (Cosma-Jordan) by Cook da Books – 3:38
7. "Reaching Out" (Cosma-Harvest) by Freddie Meyer & King Harvest Group – 4:57
8. "Rockin’ at the Hop" (Cosma-Jordan) by Paul Hudson – 3:20
9. "Silverman" (instrumental) (Cosma) by King Harvest Group – 2:48
10. "La boum 2" (instrumental) (Cosma) by King Harvest Group – 3:07

== Reception ==
=== Box office ===
Like its predecessor, La Boum 2 was a financial success, earning 4,071,600 admissions in France, and 651,235 admissions in West Germany.

=== Awards and nominations ===
- 1983 César Award for Most Promising Actress (Sophie Marceau) Won
- 1983 César Award Nomination for Best Music (Vladimir Cosma)
- 1983 César Award Nomination for Best Supporting Actress (Denise Grey)
