= Smaller =

English alternative rock/Britpop band

- Origin: Liverpool, England
- Genres: Britpop; alternative rock
- Years active: Early 1990s–late 1990s
- Label: Better
- Past members: Peter Deary; Jason Riley; Paul Cavanagh; Steven Deary; Barry Sutton

Smaller were an English Britpop band from Liverpool, active during the 1990s. They had a Top 5 hit in UK Independent Charts with God I hate this town and top 55 UK national hits with "Wasted" and "Is" in 1996 and 1997.

== History ==
The band was formed in the early 1990s by Steven Deary, his brother Peter Digsy Deary ( ex Cook da books ) Jason Riley and Paul Cavanagh. They were originally known as Small and had built up a strong local fan base due to their regular sellout shows around Liverpool at venues such as The Picket and The Lomax. It was at this point that Steven was introduced to Noel Gallagher for the first time by his cousins The Real People at an Inspiral Carpets show in Birmingham,( Noel and Mark Coyle worked for the Inspirals as guitar tech and sound engineer ) they exchanged demo tapes and met up the next night at the Manchester Academy show professing their love for each other's bands and promising to play support to each other's next hometown shows. Smaller then supported Oasis at The Boardwalk in Manchester and Oasis supported Smaller at Le Bateau in Liverpool. Soon after Oasis signed to Creation records they invited Smaller to support them on their first major headline tour along with Scottish band Whiteout. Around this time Polydor records made an offer to sign Smaller but they decided to sign to ex Creation records MD Tim Abbots new label Better Records with whom they recorded their debut single "God I Hate This Town"reaching no 5 in the UK independent chart .Work had now started on their debut album Badly Badly with Oasis producer Mark Coyle. The follow up single Stray Dogs and Bin Bags was released with national press, radio 1 interviews, John Peel sessions, TV appearances ( The Big Breakfast, The Chart Show amongst others ) as well as a sellout tour of Japan now booked in after a successful b- sides album release over there. Following their own headline tour of Britain Smaller embarked on an arena tour with Oasis as well as guesting at Oasis Irvine beach show with The Verve. They recorded a session for John Peel's BBC Radio 1 show in November that year. A second single failed to chart, but they broke into the UK top 75 with "Wasted" in September 1996. Their next single, "Is", which featured Noel Gallagher on guitar, gave them their biggest hit, reaching number 55 in the UK in March 1997. The band's debut album, Badly Badly, was released in April 1997, featuring further contributions from Gallagher. A second album was recorded, featuring a guest appearance from Richard Hawley, but it remained unreleased.

The band's lyrical themes included relationships, financial problems, and Digsy's experiences with drugs.

== Discography ==
=== Albums ===
- Badly Badly (1997) No. 86

=== Singles ===
- "God I Hate This Town" (1995) No. 141
- "The Smaller EP" (October 1995) No. 100 (4-song EP)
- "Stray Dogs and Bin Bags" (1996) No. 160
- "Wasted" (September 1996) No. 72
- "Is" (March 1997) No. 55
