= Dimitri Rougeul =

French actor

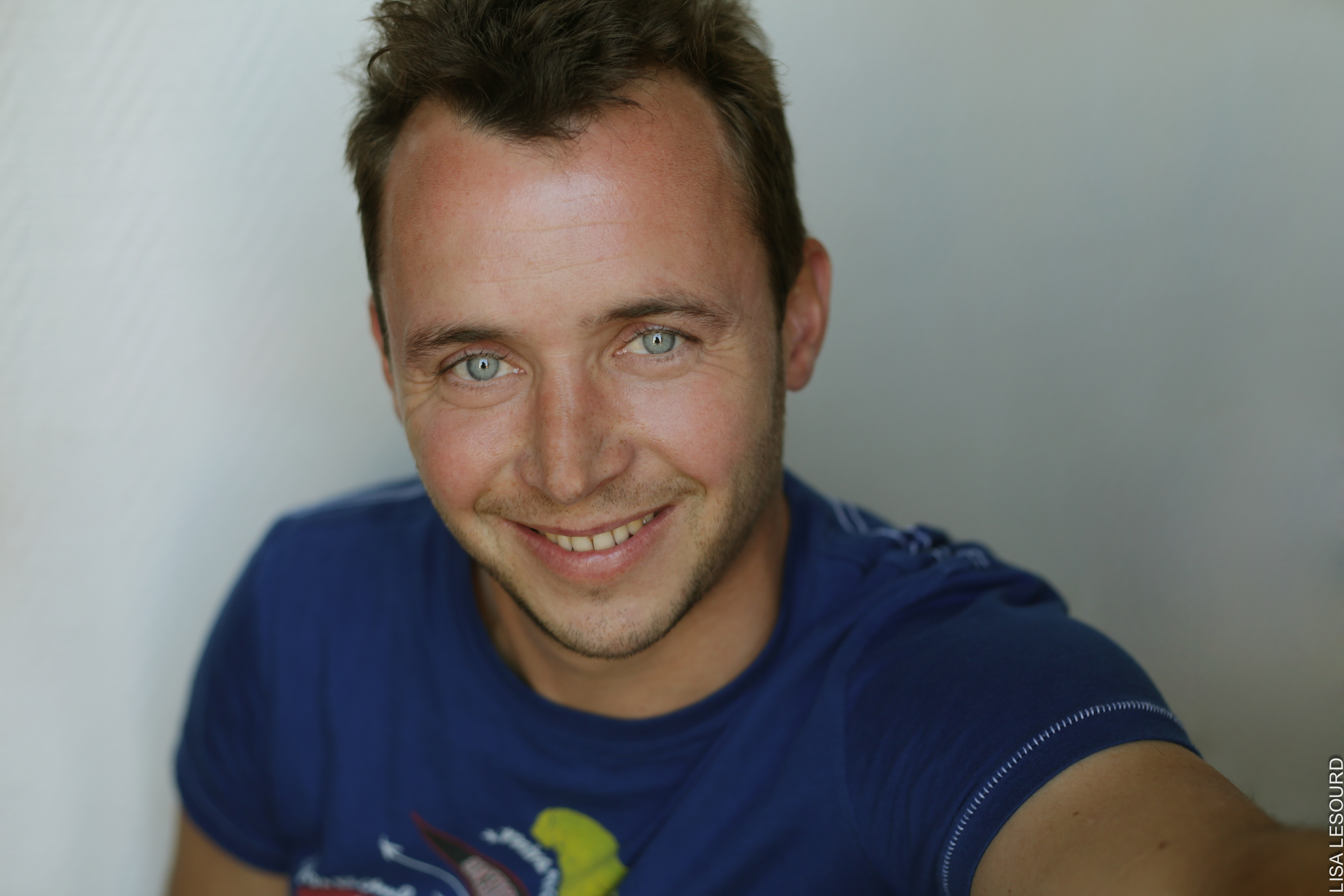
Dimitri Rougeul

Dimitri Rougeul (born 7 September 1981 in Thiais) is a French actor who specializes in dubbing.

== Filmography ==
=== Cinema ===
- 1987: Voulez-vous mourir avec moi?
- 1989: Vanille Fraise
- 1990: L'Opération Corned-Beef
- 1992: La Crise
- 1994: Quand j'avais cinq ans je m'ai tué
- 1995: Au petit Marguery

=== Television ===
==== TV specials ====
- 1991: Appelez-moi Tonton from Dominique Baron
- 1991: Les Ritals from Marcel Bluwal.
- 1994: L'Île aux mômes – TV special from Caroline Huppert: Alexandre
- 1995: Le sang du renard from Serge Meynard, avec Marianne Basler
- 1997: Entre terre et mer ou Le Grand Banc, French miniseries with 6 episodes created and directed by Hervé Baslé: Félix Guibert
- 1998: Beautiful Grandmother from Marion Sarrault.
- 2000: Patagonia's Friend from Olivier Langlois.
- 2009: I, François Villon from Serge Meynard.

==== Television series ====
- Commissaire Moulin: Nicolas Fournier ("The Little Home" episode)
- P.J. (season 7): Florent
- The Eloise Investigations Rome, produced by Christophe Douchand (2003)
- The Emergency Medical Team: 2 episodes – Paparazzi (2007), Je t'aime un peu, beaucoup (2008)

== Dubbing ==
=== Cinema ===
- Jumanji: Alan Parish (child) (French dub)
- The River Wild: Roarke Hartman (French dub)
- The Santa Clause: Charlie Calvin (French dub)
- The Lion King: Young Simba (French dub)
- Thumbelina: Little Bees (French dub)
- An American Tail: Fievel Goes West: Fievel Mousekewitz (French dub)
- An American Tail: The Treasure of Manhattan Island: Tony Topponi (French dub)
- Bambi: Young Thumper (French dub)
- A Bronx Tale: Calogero 'C' Anello (9 years old) (French dub)
- The Mighty Ducks: Peter (French dub)
- Home Alone 2: Lost in New York: Fuller (French dub)

=== Television ===
- Summerland: Cameron Bale (season 2) (French dub)
- Alles was zählt: Jan Niklas Berg (Ben Roschinski) (French dub)
- Recess: Vince (French dub)
- United States of Tara: Marshall (French dub)
- Roméo: Romeo Miller (Lil' Romeo) (French dub)
- The Little Prince: Thery (French dub)
- The Replacements: Todd Daring (French dub)
- Toriko: Komatsu (anime adaptation, French dub)

== Theater ==
- 1994: On purge bébé by Georges Feydeau, stage performance by Bernard Murat, Théâtre Édouard VII
- 1997: Les Côtelettes by Bertrand Blier, stage performance by Bernard Murat, Théâtre de la Porte-Saint-Martin
