= Nelson Monfort =

French sports journalist and television host

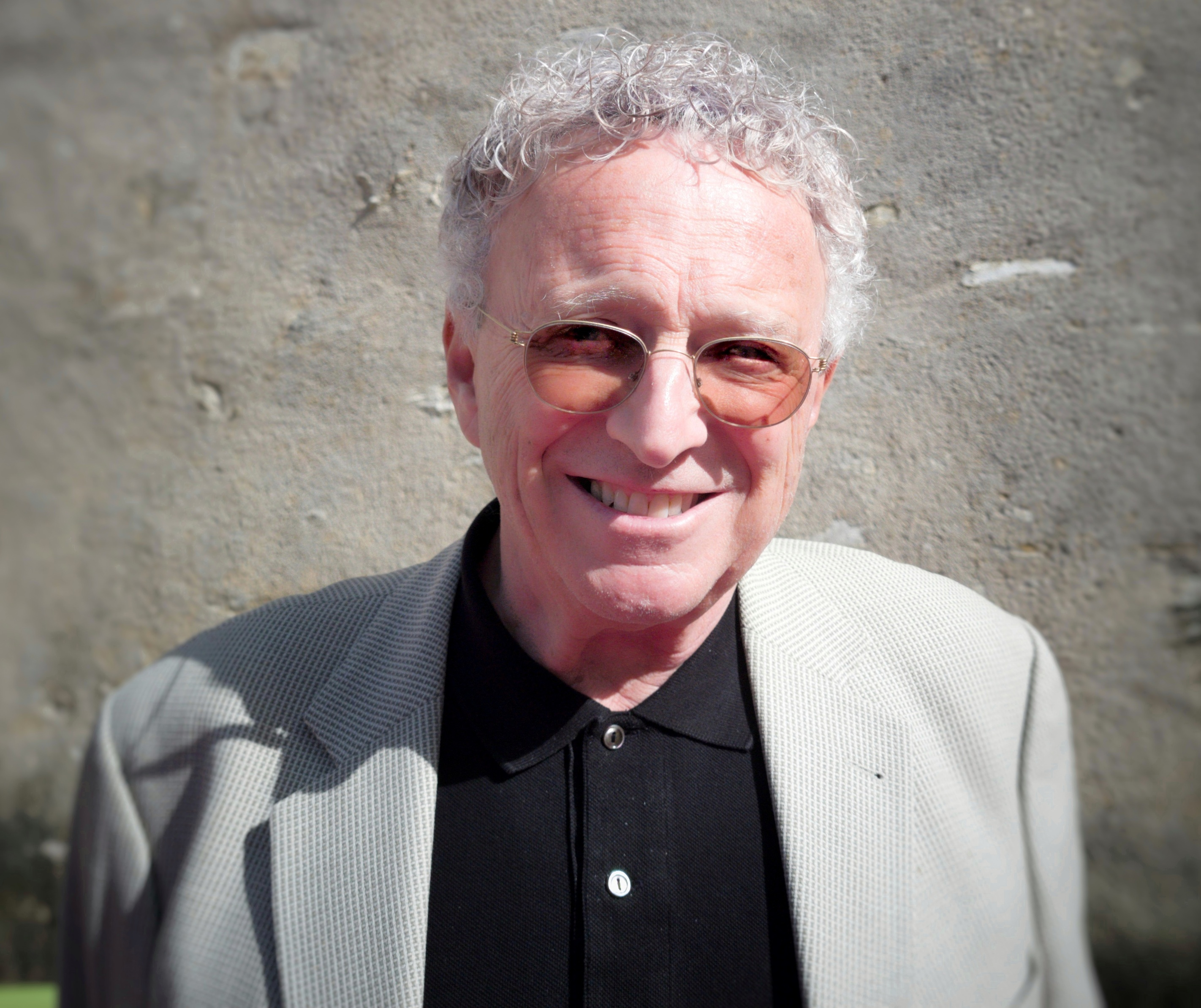
- Nelson Monfort in 2023
- Born: 12 March 1953 (age 72); Boulogne-Billancourt, France
- Occupation: Television journalist

Nelson Monfort (born March 12, 1953) is a French sports journalist, linguist and television host.

== TV and radio career ==
After his studies at the Paris Institute of Political Studies, Monfort began his career as a sports journalist by commenting figure skating events. A Frenchman of American heritage, he is fluent in English in addition to his native French, and can also speak Spanish, Italian and German, which helped him in his career as he was able to interview various international athletes. Among his most famous interviews are that of Martina Navratilova in 1987, Carl Lewis, Bill Clinton at Roland Garros in 2001 and sprinter Michael Johnson during the Olympic Games in Atlanta.

He hosted sports TV show Le Journal des Sports during the 1980s and 1990s on FR3, then Les Mélodies de Nelson on Radio Classique, and wrote for newspaper Le Figaro.

In September 2008, he became a columnist of Le Club Sports on Europe 1, alongside Alexandre Delpérier.

He also hosted the game shows Jeux Sans Frontières in 1999 (with Fabienne Égal), Une semaine chrono in 2006 (with Pierre Mathieu) and Intervilles (with Philippe Candeloro).

== Controversies ==
In June 2009, Monfort was criticized by some journalists' unions within France Télévisions for interviewing "Mickey Mouse" on his TV show Tennis Club. While the character was officially here to campaign for a charity, the unions questioned Monfort's adherence to journalism ethics and accused him of promoting the Disneyland Park, as he was in the park a few days before to provide commentary for a "Tennis Party".

== Personal life ==
Nelson Monfort was born on March 12, 1953, in Boulogne-Billancourt in the Hauts-de-Seine department of France, to an American father, Colonel Nelson W. Monfort, and a Dutch mother, Bequita van de Kerkove. He was raised in France in his father's Protestant religion.

According to Monfort, while his father was American, his surname is French and was originally "de Montfort"; the "de" part allegedly being a nobiliary particle that was dropped when Monfort's Huguenot ancestors emigrated out of France to escape religious persecution following the revocation of the Edict of Nantes.

He is married and has two children; one of his daughters, Victoria, is an actress and TV host.

Monfort claimed he and his wife saw an unidentified flying object (UFO) at night in 1985 in the Alps. He described the object as a "shiny rectangle" that was "making no sound at all" and eventually "did a 45-degree turn and flew amazingly fast into the sky".

== Bibliography ==
- Monfort, Nelson; de Laborderie, Renaud (2000). Nelson Monfort hors antenne. Solar. ISBN 978-2263027055. Prefaced by Stéphane Diagana.
- Monfort, Nelson (2009). C'est à vous, Nelson. Le Moment. ISBN 978-2354170479. Prefaced by Nicolas Canteloup.
