= La Boum =

1980 French film

- Theatrical release poster
- Directed by: Claude Pinoteau
- Screenplay by: Danièle Thompson; Claude Pinoteau
- Dialogue by: Danièle Thompson
- Produced by: Marcel Dassault
- Starring: Sophie Marceau; Brigitte Fossey; Claude Brasseur
- Cinematography: Edmond Séchan
- Edited by: Marie-Josèphe Yoyotte
- Music by: Vladimir Cosma
- Production company: Gaumont
- Distributed by: Gaumont Distribution
- Release date: 17 December 1980 (France)
- Running time: 110 minutes
- Country: France
- Language: French
- Box office: $32.8 million

La Boum (English title: The Party or Ready for Love) is a 1980 French teen romantic comedy film directed by Claude Pinoteau and starring Sophie Marceau, appearing in her film début. Written by Danièle Thompson and Pinoteau, the film is about a thirteen-year-old French girl finding her way at a new high school and coping with domestic problems. The film earned 4,378,500 admissions in France and was an international box-office hit. The music was written by Vladimir Cosma, with Richard Sanderson singing the song "Reality". A sequel, La Boum 2, was released in 1982.

== Plot ==
François, a dentist, and his wife Françoise, an illustrator, move to Paris and place their daughter Vic, aged 13, in one of the capital's best schools. Making friends, her free time becomes a whirl of discos, cinemas, and parties.

François is contacted by Vanessa, a former lover, who insists he spends a final night with her and, when he tries to go home, rings Françoise to say he was taken to a hospital with a broken leg. After keeping up that pretense for a while, François comes clean with his wife, who kicks him out, smashes up Vanessa's shop, and starts an affair with Éric, one of Vic's teachers, who is then punched in the street by François.

Trying to make sense of her parents' behaviour, Vic is helped by her great-grandmother Poupette, who encourages her in her pursuit of Matthieu, the boy of her dreams.

Françoise discovers that she is pregnant and decides to reconcile with François. At Vic's 14th birthday party, she is in the arms of Matthieu when she suddenly sees another boy of her dreams.

== Cast ==
- Sophie Marceau as Victoire "Vic" Beretton
- Brigitte Fossey as Françoise Beretton
- Claude Brasseur as François Beretton
- Denise Grey as Poupette Valadier
- Alexandre Sterling as Matthieu
- Dominique Lavanant as Vanessa
- Jean-Michel Dupuis as Étienne
- Sheila O'Connor as Pénélope Fontanet
- Alexandra Gonin as Samantha Fontanet
- Bernard Giraudeau as Éric Lehmann/Thompson
- Jean-Pierre Castaldi as Brassac
- Jacques Ardouin as Père de Raoul
- Evelyne Bellego as Éliane
- Richard Bohringer as Guibert
- Jean-Claude Bouillaud as Father Boum 2
- Olivier Gins as Marc
- Vladimir Cosma as himself

== Production ==
=== Soundtrack ===
1. "Reality" (Cosma-Jordan) by Richard Sanderson – 4:45
2. "It Was Love" (Cosma-Jordan) by The Regiment – 4:30
3. "Formalities (instrumental)" (Cosma-Jordan) by Orchestra Vladimir Cosma – 3:40
4. "Gotta Get a Move On" (Cosma-Jordan) by Karoline Krüger – 2:58
5. "Swingin' Around" (Cosma-Jordan) by The Cruisers – 2:47
6. "Gotta Get a Move On" (Cosma-Jordan) by The Regiment – 4:42
7. "Formalities" (Cosma-Jordan) by The Regiment – 3:41
8. "Gotta Get a Move On (instrumental)" (Cosma-Jordan) by Orchestra Vladimir Cosma – 3:00
9. "Murky Turkey" (Cosma-Jordan) by Richard Sanderson – 3:48
10. "Go On Forever" (Cosma-Jordan) by Richard Sanderson – 3:43

== Reception ==
=== Box office ===
La Boum was an international box office success, earning 4,378,500 admissions (ticket sales) in France, 1,289,289 admissions in Hungary, and 664,981 admissions in West Germany.

=== Critical response ===
In his review for AllMovie, Hal Erickson called the film "disarmingly diverting" and a "real audience pleaser".

== Sequel ==
A sequel, La Boum 2, was released in 1982 in which Marceau reprised her role as Vic. In the sequel, Vic does not have a boyfriend, while her parents are happily back together, and her great-grandmother is considering marriage to her long-term boyfriend. When Vic meets a young boy and becomes attracted to him, she faces the important decision of making love for the first time, as her friends have already done.
