= List of top 10 singles in 2023 (France) =

This is a list of singles that have peaked in the top 10 of the French Singles Chart in 2023.

== Top 10 singles ==
Key

Symbol	Meaning
◁	Indicates single's top 10 entry was also its French Singles Chart top 100 debut

Artist(s)	Single	Peak	Peak date	Weeks at #1	Ref.
Pierre de Maere	"Un jour je marierai un ange"	6	15 January	-	
Bizarrap and Shakira	"Shakira: Bzrp Music Sessions, Vol. 53"	3	22 January	-	
Miley Cyrus	"Flowers"	1	22 January	33	
Aya Nakamura	"Baby"	10	5 February	-	
Robin Schulz and Oliver Tree	"Miss You"	9	19 February	-	
Sofia Carson	"Come Back Home"	8	19 February	-	
Depeche Mode	"Ghosts Again"	2	19 February	-	
Ed Sheeran	"Celestial"	7	5 March	-	
Lil Nas X	"Star Walkin'"	7	12 March	-	
Dermot Kennedy	"Kiss Me"	3	12 March	-	
Jimin	"Set Me Free Pt. 2"	5	26 March	-	
Christophe Maé and Ceuzany	"Pays des merveilles"	3	26 March	-	
Jimin	"Like Crazy"	10	2 April	-	
Benson Boone and Philippine Lavrey	"In the Stars"	7	2 April	-	
Zaho de Sagazan	"Tristesse"	10	9 April	-	
Kendji Girac and Florent Pagny	"Encore"	2	9 April	-	
Nuit Incolore	"Dépassé"	9	16 April	-	
Louane	"Secret"	3	16 April	-	
Lizzo	"2 Be Loved (Am I Ready)"	8	23 April	-	
Jain	"The Fool"	2	23 April	-	
Black Eyed Peas and Daddy Yankee	"Bailar Contigo"	7	30 April	-	
Sound of Legend	"Some Kind of Kiss"	4	7 May	-	
Ed Sheeran	"Eyes Closed"	3	14 May	-	
David Guetta featuring Anne-Marie and Coi Leray	"Baby Don't Hurt Me"	2	14 May	-	
DJ Belite	"All Eyez on Me"	8	21 May	-	
La Zarra	"Évidemment"	4	21 May	-	
Karol G and Shakira	"TQG"	6	28 May	-	
Purple Disco Machine and Kungs featuring Julian Perretta	"Substitution"	3	28 May	-	
Ayra Starr	"Rush"	2	28 May	-	
Christopher	"A Beautiful Life" ◁	9	11 June	-	
Kygo featuring Paul McCartney and Michael Jackson	"Say Say Say"	7	11 June	-	
Halsey and Suga	"Lilith" ◁	6	11 June	-	
Rosalía and Rauw Alejandro	"Beso"	5	11 June	-	
Calvin Harris and Ellie Goulding	"Miracle"	9	18 June	-	
BTS	"Take Two"	6	18 June	-	
Måneskin	"Baby Said"	6	25 June	-	
David Kushner	"Daylight"	8	2 July	-	
Imagine Dragons	"Waves"	5	2 July	-	
Jungkook	"Still with You" ◁	5	9 July	-	
Kendji Girac and Vianney	"Le feu"	2	9 July	-	
R3hab featuring Inna and Sash!	"Rock My Body"	6	16 July	-	
Mentissa	"Mamma Mia"	7	23 July	-	
Jungkook featuring Latto	"Seven"	3	23 July	-	
Peggy Gou	"(It Goes Like) Nanana"	10	13 August	-	
Trinix and Fafá de Bélem	"Emorio"	7	20 August	-	
King Serenity, Locko and Sergio Alejandro	"All for U (Ameyatchi)"	4	20 August	-	
Dua Lipa	"Dance the Night"	3	20 August	-	
Vianney and Zazie	"Comment on fait"	3	27 August	-	
Loreen	"Tattoo"	1	3 September	6	
Becky G featuring Omega	"Arranca"	4	10 September	-	
Louane	"Pardonne-moi"	10	17 September	-	
The Rolling Stones	"Angry"	7	17 September	-	
OneRepublic	"Runaway"	10	24 September	-	
Trinix and One-T	"The Magic Key"	8	24 September	-	
Marnik, Naeleck and Vinai	"Boyz in Paris"	7	24 September	-	
Soolking featuring Gazo	"Casanova"	5	24 September	-	
Jungeli, Imen Es, Alonzo, Abou Debeing and Lossa	"Petit génie"	2	24 September	-	
Doja Cat	"Paint the Town Red"	4	15 October	-	
Francis Cabrel	"Un morceau de Sicre"	8	22 October	-	
Sia	"Gimme Love"	2	22 October	-	
Iñigo Quintero	"Si No Estás"	1	22 October	3	
Vianney and Renaud	"Maintenant"	9	5 November	-	
Ofenbach featuring Norma Jean Martine	"Overdrive"	6	5 November	-	
Jungkook	"Standing Next to You"	6	12 November	-	
The Beatles	"Now and Then"	2	12 November	-	
Santa	"Popcorn salé" ◁	1	12 November	15	
KeBlack	"Laisse moi"	10	26 November	-	
Bennett	"Vois sur ton chemin"	6	26 November	-	
Mika	"Jane Birkin"	4	3 December	-	
Slimane	"Mon amour"	2	3 December	-	
Grand Corps Malade	"Retiens les rêves"	7	10 December	-	
Aliocha Schneider	"Ensemble"	9	17 December	-	
Teddy Swims	"Lose Control"	2	24 December	-	

== Entries by artist ==
The following table shows artists who achieved two or more top 10 entries in 2023. The figures include both main artists and featured artists and the peak position in brackets.

Entries	Artist	Singles
3	Jungkook	"Still with You" (5), "Seven" (3), "Standing Next to You" (6)
3	Vianney	"Le feu" (2), "Comment on fait" (3), "Maintenant" (9)
2
2	Ed Sheeran	"Celestial" (7), "Eyes Closed" (3)
2	Jimin	"Set Me Free, Pt. 2" (5), "Like Crazy" (10)
2	Kendji Girac	"Encore" (2), "Le feu" (2)
2	Louane	"Secret" (3), "Pardonne-moi" (10)
2	Shakira	"Shakira: Bzrp Music Sessions, Vol. 53" (3), "TQG" (6)
2	Trinix	"Emorio" (7), "The Magic Key" (8)

== See also ==
- 2023 in music
- List of number-one hits of 2023 (France)
