= NRJ Music Award =

French music event

NRJ Music Awards
- 2023 edition's logo.
- Awarded for: Best in music and pop culture
- Country: France
- Presented by: NRJ & TF1
- Hosted by: Ophélie Winter (2000); Anthony Kavanagh (2001–2006); Arthur (2007); Benjamin Castaldi (2008); Camille Combal (2022); Nikos Aliagas (2009–2021 and 2023-)
- First award: 22 January 2000; 26 years ago
- Website: https://www.nrj.fr/music-awards

Television/radio coverage
- Network: TF1, NRJ

An NRJ Music Award (commonly abbreviated as an NMA) is an award presented by the French radio station NRJ to honor the best in the French and worldwide music industry. The awards ceremony, created in 2000 by NRJ in partnership with the television network TF1, traditionally took place every year in mid-January at Cannes (Provence-Alpes-Côte d'Azur, France) as the opening of MIDEM (Marché international de l'édition musicale). It is now held in the month of November. They give out awards to popular musicians in different categories.

The name "NRJ" means "Nouvelle Radio des Jeunes" (new radio of the young). It is a play on words between the pronunciation of the French letters and the French word "énergie" (energy). Val Kahl hosted and presented "Les Coulisses des NRJ Music Awards" Season 2011, 2012 and 2013 on NRJ12.

== Award categories ==
Awards in the following categories are awarded to the musicians each year:

- Francophone Breakthrough of the Year (Révélation francophone de l'année)
- International Breakthrough of the Year (Révélation internationale de l'année)
- Francophone Male Artist of the Year (Artiste masculin francophone de l'année)
- International Male Artist of the Year (Artiste masculin international de l'année)
- Francophone Female Artist of the Year (Artiste féminine francophone de l'année)
- International Female Artist of the Year (Artiste féminine internationale de l'année)
- Francophone Song of the Year (Chanson francophone de l'année)
- International Song of the Year (Chanson internationale de l'année)
- Francophone Album of the Year (Album francophone de l'année)
- International Album of the Year (Album international de l'année)
- Francophone Duo/Group of the Year (Groupe/duo francophone de l'année)
- International Duo/Group of the Year (Groupe/duo international de l'année)
- Video of the Year (Clip de l'année)

NRJ chooses 5 nominees in each category, and subjects them to online voting on their website. Subsequently, the winners are determined by a system where the public weighs in at 75% of the decision, and a jury established by NRJ and TF1 at 25%.

== Award winners ==
Award Winners: 2000 – 2001 – 2002 – 2003 – 2004 – 2005 – 2006 – 2007 – 2008 – 2009

=== 2000 Award Winners – 1st NRJ Music Awards ===
- Francophone Breakthrough of the Year: Hélène Ségara
- International Breakthrough of the Year: Tina Arena
- Francophone Male Artist of the Year: David Hallyday
- International Male Artist of the Year: Will Smith
- Francophone Female Artist of the Year: Mylène Farmer
- International Female Artist of the Year: Mariah Carey
- Francophone Song of the Year: Zebda – "Tomber la chemise"
- International Song of the Year: Lou Bega – "Mambo No. 5"
- Francophone Album of the Year: Mylène Farmer – Innamoramento
- International Album of the Year: Whitney Houston – My Love Is Your Love
- Francophone Duo/Group of the Year: Zebda
- International Duo/Group of the Year: Texas
- Music Website of the Year: Indochine
- Best concert of the Year: Mylène Farmer

=== 2001 Award Winners – 2nd NRJ Music Awards ===
- Francophone Breakthrough of the Year: Alizée
- International Breakthrough of the Year: Anastacia
- Francophone Male Artist of the Year: Pascal Obispo
- International Male Artist of the Year: Moby
- Francophone Female Artist of the Year: Mylène Farmer
- International Female Artist of the Year: Madonna
- Francophone Song of the Year: Damien Sargue & Grégori Baquet & Philippe D'Avilla – "Les Rois du monde" (Extrait De spectacle musical de gérard presgurvic "Roméo et Juliette, de la Haine à l'Amour")
- International Song of the Year: Anastacia – "I'm Outta Love"
- Francophone Album of the Year: Hélène Ségara – Au nom d'une femme
- International Album of the Year: Madonna – Music
- Francophone Duo/Group of the Year: Les Dix Commandements
- International Duo/Group of the Year: The Corrs
- Music Website of the Year: Alizée

=== 2002 Award Winners – 3rd NRJ Music Awards ===
- Francophone Breakthrough of the Year: Ève Angeli
- International Breakthrough of the Year: Dido
- Francophone Male Artist of the Year: Garou
- International Male Artist of the Year: Michael Jackson
- Francophone Female Artist of the Year: Mylène Farmer
- International Female Artist of the Year: Jennifer Lopez
- Francophone Song of the Year: Axel Bauer & Zazie – "À ma place"
- International Song of the Year: Geri Halliwell – "It's Raining Men"
- Francophone Album of the Year: Gérald De Palmas – Marcher dans le sable
- International Album of the Year: Dido – No Angel
- Francophone Duo/Group of the Year: Garou & Céline Dion
- International Duo/Group of the Year: Destiny's Child
- Music Website of the Year: Garou

=== 2003 Award Winners – 4th NRJ Music Awards ===
- Francophone Breakthrough of the Year: Jenifer
- International Breakthrough of the Year: Las Ketchup
- Francophone Male Artist of the Year: Gérald De Palmas
- International Male Artist of the Year: Billy Crawford
- Francophone Female Artist of the Year: Mylène Farmer
- International Female Artist of the Year: Shakira
- Francophone Song of the Year: Renaud & Axelle Red – "Manhattan-Kaboul"
- International Song of the Year: Shakira – "Whenever, Wherever"
- Francophone Breakthrough of the Year: Lorie
- Francophone Album of the Year: Indochine – Paradize
- International Album of the Year: Shakira – Laundry Service
- Francophone Duo/Group of the Year: Renaud & Axelle Red
- International Duo/Group of the Year: The Calling
- Music Website of the Year: Jennifer Lopez
- NRJ Award of Honor for the Career: Phil Collins

=== 2004 Award Winners – 5th NRJ Music Awards ===
- Francophone Breakthrough of the Year: Nolwenn Leroy
- International Breakthrough of the Year: Evanescence
- Francophone Male Artist of the Year: Calogero
- International Male Artist of the Year: Justin Timberlake
- Francophone Female Artist of the Year: Jenifer
- International Female Artist of the Year: Dido
- Francophone Song of the Year: Kyo feat. Sita – "Le Chemin"
- International Song of the Year: Blue featuring Elton John – "Sorry Seems to Be the Hardest Word"
- Francophone Album of the Year: Kyo – Le Chemin
- International Album of the Year: Dido – Life for Rent
- Francophone Duo/Group of the Year: Kyo
- International Duo/Group of the Year: Good Charlotte
- Music website of the Year: Kyo
- NRJ Award of Honor for the Career: Madonna

=== 2005 Award Winners – 6th NRJ Music Awards ===
- Francophone Breakthrough of the Year: Emma Daumas
- International Breakthrough of the Year: Maroon 5
- Francophone Male Artist of the Year: Roch Voisine
- International Male Artist of the Year: Usher
- Francophone Female Artist of the Year: Jenifer
- International Female Artist of the Year: Avril Lavigne
- Francophone Song of the Year: K-Maro featuring Nancy Martinez – "Femme Like U (Donne-moi ton corps)"
- International Song of the Year: Maroon 5 – "This Love"
- Francophone Album of the Year: Jenifer – Le Passage
- International Album of the Year: Black Eyed Peas – Elephunk
- Francophone Duo/Group of the Year: Calogero & Passi
- International Duo/Group of the Year: Placebo
- Video of the Year: Corneille – "Parce qu'on vient de loin"
- NRJ Award of Honor for the Career: U2

=== 2006 Award Winners – 7th NRJ Music Awards ===
- Francophone Breakthrough of the Year: Grégory Lemarchal
- International Breakthrough of the Year: James Blunt
- Francophone Male Artist of the Year: Raphaël
- International Male Artist of the Year: Robbie Williams
- Francophone Female Artist of the Year: Jenifer
- International Female Artist of the Year: Madonna
- Francophone Song of the Year: M. Pokora feat. Sweety – "Elle me contrôle"
- International Song of the Year: Anastacia – "Left Outside Alone"
- Francophone Album of the Year: Mylène Farmer – Avant que l'ombre...
- International Album of the Year: Black Eyed Peas – Monkey Business
- Francophone Duo/Group of the Year: Le Roi Soleil
- International Duo/Group of the Year: Black Eyed Peas
- Video of the Year: M. Pokora feat. Sweety – "Elle me contrôle"
- NRJ Award of Honor: Bob Geldof (for organizing the Live 8)

=== 2007 Award Winners – 8th NRJ Music Awards ===
- Francophone Breakthrough of the Year: Christophe Maé
- International Breakthrough of the Year: Nelly Furtado
- Francophone Female Artist of the Year: Diam's
- International Female Artist of the Year: Christina Aguilera
- Francophone Male Artist of the Year: M. Pokora
- International Male Artist of the Year: Justin Timberlake
- Francophone Duo/Group of the Year: Le Roi Soleil
- International Duo/Group of the Year: Evanescence
- International Song of the Year: Rihanna – "Unfaithful"
- Francophone Album of the Year: Diam's – Dans ma bulle
- International Album of the Year: Christina Aguilera – Back to Basics
- Francophone Song of the Year: Diam's – "La Boulette (Génération Nan Nan)"
- Video of the Year: M. Pokora – "De retour"
- DJ of the Year: Bob Sinclar

=== 2008 Awards Winners – 9th NRJ Music Awards ===
- Francophone Breakthrough of the Year: Christophe Willem
- International Breakthrough of the Year: Mika
- Francophone Female Artist of the Year: Jenifer
- International Female Artist of the Year: Avril Lavigne
- Francophone Male Artist of the Year: Christophe Maé
- International Male Artist of the Year: Justin Timberlake
- Francophone Duo/Group of the Year: Superbus
- International Duo/Group of the Year: Tokio Hotel
- International Song of the Year: Rihanna – "Don't Stop the Music"
- Francophone Album of the Year: Christophe Willem – Inventaire
- International Album of the Year: Britney Spears – Blackout
- Francophone Song of the Year: Christophe Maé – "On s'attache"
- Video of the Year: Fatal Bazooka – "Parle à ma main"
- NRJ Award of Honor: Céline Dion, Michael Jackson and Kylie Minogue

=== 2009 Awards Winners – 10th NRJ Music Awards ===
- Francophone Breakthrough of the Year: Zaho
- International Breakthrough of the Year: Jonas Brothers
- Francophone Female Artist of the Year: Jenifer
- International Female Artist of the Year: Britney Spears
- Francophone Male Artist of the Year: Christophe Maé
- International Male Artist of the Year: Enrique Iglesias
- Francophone Duo/Group of the Year: Cléopâtre
- International Duo/Group of the Year: The Pussycat Dolls
- International Song of the Year: Rihanna – "Disturbia"
- Francophone Album of the Year: Mylène Farmer - Point de suture
- International Album of the Year: Katy Perry – One of the Boys
- Francophone Song of the Year: Christophe Maé – "Belle Demoiselle"
- Video of the Year: Britney Spears – "Womanizer"
- NRJ Award of Honor: Coldplay

=== 2010 Awards Winners – 11th NRJ Music Awards ===
- Francophone Breakthrough of the Year: Florent Mothe
- International Breakthrough of the Year: Lady Gaga
- Francophone Female Artist of the Year: Sofia Essaïdi
- International Female Artist of the Year: Rihanna
- Francophone Male Artist of the Year: Christophe Willem
- International Male Artist of the Year: Robbie Williams
- Francophone Duo/Group of the Year: Mozart, l'opéra rock
- International Duo/Group of the Year: Tokio Hotel
- Francophone Song of the Year: Florent Mothe - "L'Assasymphonie" (Mozart l'Opéra Rock)
- International Song of the Year: Black Eyed Peas - "I Gotta Feeling"
- Francophone Album of the Year: Christophe Willem - Caféine
- International Album of the Year: David Guetta - One Love
- Song Most Downloaded of the Year in France: Helmut Fritz - "Ça m'énerve"
- NRJ Award of Honor: Robbie Williams and Beyoncé

=== 2011 Awards Winners – 12th NRJ Music Awards ===
- Francophone Breakthrough of the Year: Joyce Jonathan
- International Breakthrough of the Year: Justin Bieber
- Francophone Female Artist of the Year: Jenifer
- International Female Artist of the Year: Shakira
- Francophone Male Artist of the Year: M. Pokora
- International Male Artist of the Year: Usher
- Francophone Duo/Group of the Year: Justin Nozuka feat. Zaho
- International Duo/Group of the Year: Black Eyed Peas
- Francophone Song of the Year: M. Pokora – "Juste une photo de toi"
- International Song of the Year: Shakira – "Waka Waka (This Time for Africa)"
- Concert of the Year: The Black Eyed Peas
- Video of the Year: Lady Gaga featuring Beyoncé – "Telephone"
- Hit of the Year: Flo Rida and David Guetta - "Club Can't Handle Me"
- NRJ Award of Honor: David Guetta

=== 2012 Awards Winners – 13th NRJ Music Awards ===
- NRJ Award of Diamond: Mylène Farmer
- NRJ Award of Honor: Shakira and Justin Bieber
- Francophone Breakthrough of the Year: Keen'V
- International Breakthrough of the Year: Adele
- Francophone Female Artist of the Year: Shy'm
- International Female Artist of the Year: Rihanna
- Francophone Male Artist of the Year: M. Pokora
- International Male Artist of the Year: Mika
- Francophone Duo/Group of the Year: Simple Plan
- International Duo/Group of the Year: LMFAO
- Best-selling Francophone Album of the Year : Nolwenn Leroy - Bretonne
- Francophone Song of the Year: M. Pokora - "À nos actes manqués"
- International Song of the Year: Adele – "Someone like You"
- Video of the Year: LMFAO featuring Lauren Bennett and GoonRock – "Party Rock Anthem"

=== 2013 Awards Winners – 14th NRJ Music Awards ===
- Francophone Breakthrough of the Year: Tal
- International Breakthrough of the Year: Carly Rae Jepsen
- Francophone Female Artist of the Year: Shy'm
- International Female Artist of the Year: Rihanna
- Francophone Male Artist of the Year: M. Pokora
- International Male Artist of the Year: Bruno Mars
- Francophone Duo/Group of the Year: Sexion d'Assaut
- International Duo/Group of the Year: One Direction
- Francophone Song of the Year: Sexion d'Assaut - "Avant qu'elle parte"
- International Song of the Year: Psy - "Gangnam Style"
- Video of the Year: Psy - "Gangnam Style"
- NRJ Award of Honor: Psy, Johnny Hallyday and Patrick Bruel

=== 2013 Awards Winners – 15th NRJ Music Awards ===
- Francophone Breakthrough of the Year: Louis Delort
- International Breakthrough of the Year: James Arthur
- Francophone Female Artist of the Year: Shy'm
- International Female Artist of the Year: Sia
- Francophone Male Artist of the Year: Stromae
- International Male Artist of the Year: Mika
- Francophone Duo/Group of the Year: Robin des Bois
- International Duo/Group of the Year: One Direction
- Francophone Song of the Year: Stromae - "Formidable"
- International Song of the Year: Katy Perry - "Roar"
- Video of the Year: One Direction - "Best Song Ever"
- NRJ Award of Honor: Christophe Maé

=== 2014 Awards Winners – 16th NRJ Music Awards ===
- Francophone Breakthrough of the Year: Kendji Girac
- International Breakthrough of the Year: Ariana Grande
- Francophone Female Artist of the Year: Tal
- International Female Artist of the Year: Sia
- Francophone Male Artist of the Year: M. Pokora
- International Male Artist of the Year: Pharrell Williams
- Francophone Duo/Group of the Year: Daft Punk
- International Duo/Group of the Year: One Direction
- Francophone Song of the Year: Kendji Girac - "Color Gitano"
- International Song of the Year: Sia - "Chandelier"
- Video of the Year: Black M - "Mme Pavoshko"
- NRJ Award of Honor: Stromae and Lenny Kravitz

=== 2015 Awards Winners – 17th NRJ Music Awards ===
- Francophone Breakthrough of the Year: Louane
- International Breakthrough of the Year: Ellie Goulding
- Francophone Female Artist of the Year: Shy'm
- International Female Artist of the Year: Taylor Swift
- Francophone Male Artist of the Year: M. Pokora
- International Male Artist of the Year: Ed Sheeran
- Francophone Duo/Group of the Year: Fréro Delavega
- International Duo/Group of the Year: Maroon 5
- Francophone Song of the Year: Kendji Girac - "Conmigo"
- International Song of the Year: Wiz Khalifa featuring Charlie Puth - "See You Again"
- Video of the Year: Taylor Swift featuring Kendrick Lamar - "Bad Blood"
- DJ of the Year: David Guetta
- NRJ Award of Honor: Adele, Justin Bieber, Sting and Charles Aznavour

=== 2016 Awards Winners – 18th NRJ Music Awards ===
- Francophone Breakthrough of the Year: Amir
- International Breakthrough of the Year: Twenty One Pilots
- Francophone Female Artist of the Year: Tal
- International Female Artist of the Year: Sia
- Francophone Male Artist of the Year: Soprano
- International Male Artist of the Year: Justin Bieber
- Francophone Duo/Group of the Year: Fréro Delavega
- International Duo/Group of the Year: Coldplay
- Francophone Song of the Year: Amir - "J'ai cherché"
- International Song of the Year: Justin Bieber - "Love Yourself"
- Video of the Year: Christophe Maé - "Il est où le bonheur"
- DJ of the Year: David Guetta
- Most Streamed Song: Coldplay featuring Beyoncé - "Hymn for the Weekend"
- NRJ Award of Honor: Bruno Mars, Enrique Iglesias and Coldplay

=== 2017 Awards Winners – 19th NRJ Music Awards ===
- Francophone Breakthrough of the Year: Lisandro Cuxi
- International Breakthrough of the Year: Rag'n'Bone Man
- Francophone Female Artist of the Year: Louane
- International Female Artist of the Year: Selena Gomez
- Francophone Male Artist of the Year: Soprano
- International Male Artist of the Year: Ed Sheeran
- Francophone Duo/Group of the Year: Bigflo & Oli
- International Duo/Group of the Year: Imagine Dragons
- Francophone Song of the Year: Amir - "On dirait"
- International Song of the Year: Luis Fonsi and Daddy Yankee featuring Justin Bieber - "Despacito"
- Video of the Year: Ed Sheeran - "Shape of You"
- DJ of the Year: Kungs
- Most Streamed Song: Ed Sheeran - "Shape of You"
- NRJ Award of Honor: The Weeknd, U2 and Indochine

=== 2018 Awards Winners – 20th NRJ Music Awards ===
- Francophone Breakthrough of the Year: Dadju
- International Breakthrough of the Year: Camila Cabello
- Francophone Female Artist of the Year: Jain
- International Female Artist of the Year: Ariana Grande
- Francophone Male Artist of the Year: Soprano
- International Male Artist of the Year: Ed Sheeran
- Francophone Duo/Group of the Year: Bigflo & Oli
- International Duo/Group of the Year: Imagine Dragons
- Francophone Song of the Year: Kendji Girac - "Pour oublier"
- International Song of the Year: Maroon 5 featuring Cardi B - "Girls Like You"
- Video of the Year: Bigflo & Oli - "Demain"
- DJ of the Year: DJ Snake
- Most Streamed Song: Calvin Harris featuring Dua Lipa - "One Kiss"
- NRJ Award of Honor: Shawn Mendes and Muse

=== 2019 Awards Winners – 21st NRJ Music Awards ===
- Francophone Song of the Year: Angèle feat. Roméo Elvis - "Tout oublier"
- Francophone Female Artist of the Year: Angèle
- International Female Artist of the Year: Ariana Grande
- Francophone Male Artist of the Year: M. Pokora
- International Male of the Year: Ed Sheeran
- Francophone Breakthrough of the Year: Bilal Hassani
- Francophone Duo/Group of the Year: Bigflo & Oli
- International Breakthrough of the Year: Billie Eilish
- Video of the Year: Bigflo & Oli - "Promesses"
- DJ of the Year: DJ Snake
- International Song of the year: Shawn Mendes featuring Camila Cabello - "Señorita"

=== 2020 Awards Winners – 22nd NRJ Music Awards ===
- Francophone Breakthrough of the Year: Squeezie
- International Breakthrough of the Year: Doja Cat
- Francophone Female Artist of the Year: Aya Nakamura
- International Female Artist of the Year: Dua Lipa
- Francophone Male Artist of the Year: Dadju
- International Male Artist of the Year: The Weeknd
- Francophone Duo/Group of the Year: Vitaa and Slimane
- International Duo/Group of the Year: BTS
- Francophone Song of the Year: Vitaa and Slimane - "Avant toi"
- International Song of the Year: Master KG and Burna Boy featuring Nomcebo Zikode - "Jerusalema"
- Francophone Collaboration of the Year: Soolking feat. Dadju - "Meleğim"
- International Collaboration of the Year: Lady Gaga featuring Ariana Grande - "Rain on Me"
- Francophone Performance of the Night: M. Pokora - "Si on disait"
- Video of the Year: Vitaa and Slimane - "Ça ira"
- DJ of the Year: DJ Snake
- NRJ Award of Honor: Elton John, Indochine, Gims
- International Icon: Mariah Carey

=== 2021 Awards Winners – 23rd NRJ Music Awards ===
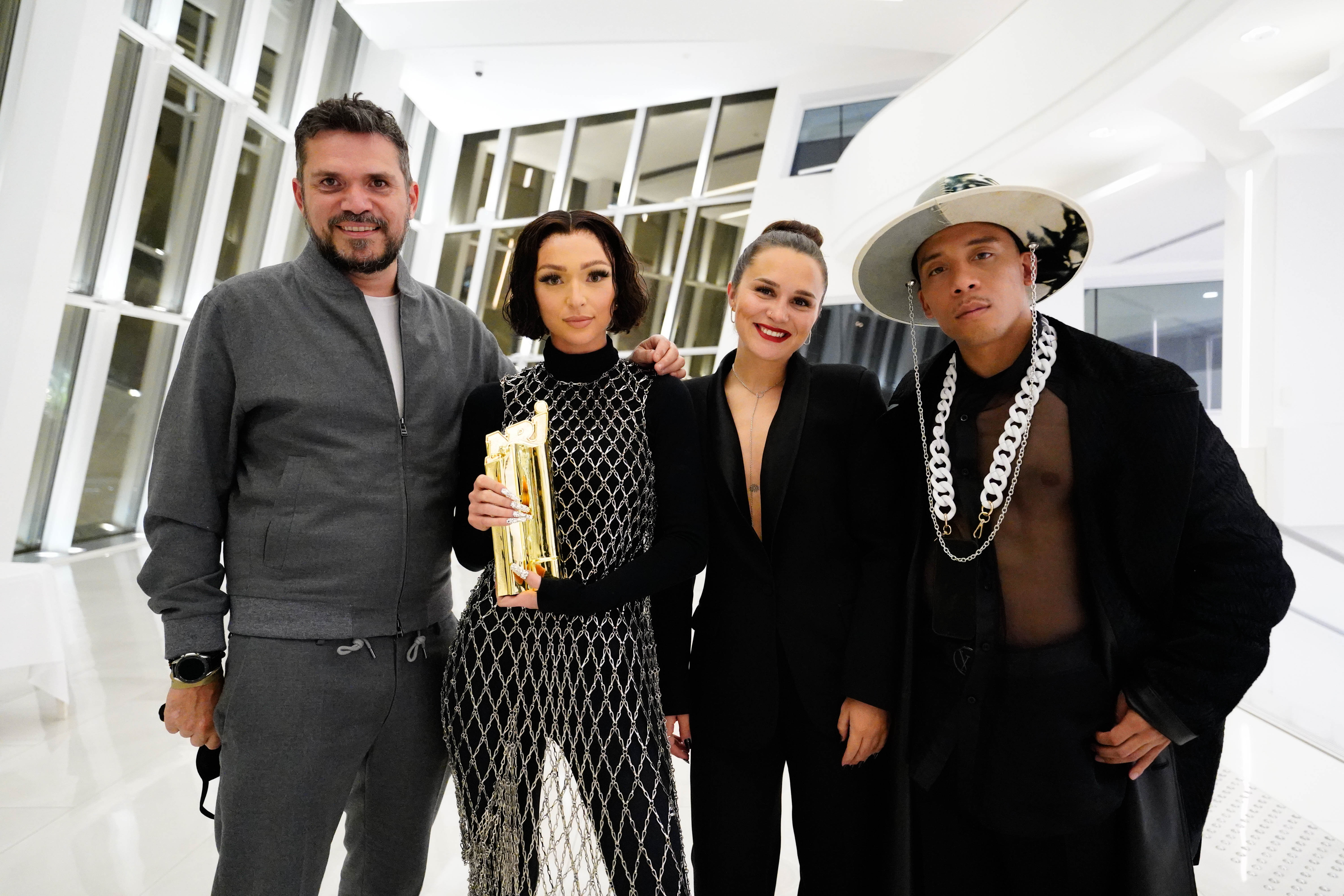
French singer Eva winner of Francophone Female Artist of 2021

- Francophone Female Artist of the Year: Eva
- Francophone Male Artist of the Year: Dadju
- Francophone Breakthrough of the Year: Naps
- Francophone Duo/Group of the Year: Vitaa and Slimane
- Francophone Collaboration of the Year: Amel Bent feat. Hatik - "1, 2, 3"
- International Female Artist of the Year: Dua Lipa
- International Male Artist of the Year: Ed Sheeran
- International Breakthrough of the Year: Olivia Rodrigo
- International Duo/Group of the Year: Coldplay
- International Collaboration of the Year: Coldplay featuring BTS - "My Universe"
- International Song of the Year: Ed Sheeran - "Bad Habits"
- Video of the Year: Vitaa and Slimane - "De l'or"
- DJ of the Year: DJ Snake
- NRJ Award of Honor: Imagine Dragons
- Francophone Song of the Year: Kendji Girac - "Evidemment"

=== 2022 Awards Winners – 24th NRJ Music Awards ===
- Francophone Male Artist of the Year: Orelsan
- Francophone Female Artist of the Year: Angèle
- Francophone Breakthrough of the Year: Lujipeka
- Francophone Duo/Group of the Year: Bigflo & Oli
- Francophone Collaboration of the Year: Bigflo & Oli feat. Julien Doré - "Coup de vieux"
- Francophone Video of the Year: Bigflo & Oli feat. Julien Doré - "Coup de vieux"
- Best Recovery or Adaptation: Soolking - "Suavemente"
- Social Hit: Alonzo feat. Ninho and Naps - "Tout va bien"
- International Male Artist of the Year: Ed Sheeran
- International Female Artist of the Year: Lady Gaga
- International Breakthrough of the Year: Sofia Carson
- International Duo/Group of the Year: Imagine Dragons
- International Collaboration of the Year: Camila Cabello featuring Ed Sheeran - "Bam Bam"
- International Song of the Year: Harry Styles - "As It Was"
- Francophone Tour of the Year: Orelsan
- DJ of the Year: David Guetta
- NRJ Award of Honour: Jenifer, Renaud
- Francophone Song of the Year: M. Pokora - "Qui on est"

=== 2023 Awards Winners – 25th NRJ Music Awards ===
- Francophone Male Artist of the Year: Slimane
- Francophone Female Artist of the Year: Vitaa
- Francophone Breakthrough of the Year: Nuit Incolore
- Francophone Duo/Group of the Year: Bigflo & Oli
- Francophone Collaboration of the Year: Slimane and Claudio Capéo - "Chez toi"
- Francophone Video of the Year: Bigflo & Oli - "Dernière"
- Francophone Song of the Year: Louane - "Secret"
- Social Hit: Jain - "Makeba"
- International Male Artist of the Year: Ed Sheeran
- International Female Artist of the Year: Dua Lipa
- International Breakthrough of the Year: Loreen
- International Duo/Group of the Year: Imagine Dragons
- International Collaboration of the Year: Rosalía featuring Rauw Alejandro - "Beso"
- International Song of the Year: Miley Cyrus - "Flowers"
- DJ of the Year: David Guetta
- International Video of the Year: Miley Cyrus - Flowers
- Best Recovery or Adaptation: Aqua and Tiësto - "Barbie Girl"
- Francophone Tour of the Year: M. Pokora
- NRJ Award of Honour: Diddy, Måneskin

=== 2024 Awards Winners – 26th NRJ Music Awards ===
- Francophone Male Artist of the Year: Slimane
- Francophone Female Artist of the Year: Vitaa
- Francophone Breakthrough of the Year: Pierre Garnier
- Francophone Collaboration of the Year: "I Love You" by Dadju and Tayc
- Francophone Group of the Year: Indochine
- Francophone Song of the Year: "Ceux qu'on était" by Pierre Garnier
- Social Hit: "Petit génie" by Jungeli feat. Imen Es, Alonzo, Abou Debeing and Lossa
- International Male Artist of the Year: The Weeknd
- International Female Artist of the Year: Taylor Swift
- International Breakthrough of the Year: Benson Boone
- Internation Duo/Group of the Year: Coldplay
- International Collaboration of the Year: "Die with a Smile" by Lady Gaga featuring Bruno Mars
- International Song of the Year: "Beautiful Things" by Benson Boone
- DJ of the Year: David Guetta
- Tour of the Year: Bigflo & Oli
- Most Airplay of the Year: "Lose Control" by Teddy Swims
- French Tour of the Year Abroad: Justice

=== 2025 Awards Winners – 27th NRJ Music Awards ===
- Francophone Female Artist of the Year: Helena
- Francophone Male Artist of the Year: Pierre Garnier
- Francophone Male Breakthrough of the Year: Julien Lieb
- Francophone Female Breakthrough of the Year: Marine
- International Male Artist of the Year: Ed Sheeran
- International Song of the Year: "Azizam" by Ed Sheeran
- Francophone Collaboration of the Year: Jungeli and Lenie - "À tes côtés"
- Francophone Song of the Year: "Mauvais garçon" by Helena
- International Female Artist of the Year: Lady Gaga
- International Collaboration of the Year: "APT." by Rosé featuring Bruno Mars
- International Breakthrough of the Year: Alex Warren
- DJ of the Year: David Guetta
- Social Hit: "Golden" (David Guetta remix) by KPop Demon Hunters
- Concert Tour: Gims
