= List of number-one hits of 2022 (France) =

This is a list of the French SNEP Top 200 Singles and Top 200 Albums number-ones of 2022.

== Number ones by week ==
=== Singles chart ===
Week	Issue date	Download + Streaming		
Week	Issue date	Artist(s)	Title	Ref.
1	7 January	Ninho	"Jefe"	
2	14 January	Ninho	"Jefe"	
3	21 January	Stromae	"L'enfer"	
4	28 January	Ninho	"Jefe"	
5	4 February	Ninho	"Jefe"	
6	11 February	Vald featuring Orelsan	"Peon"	
7	18 February	Ninho	"Jefe"	
8	25 February	Timal & Gazo	"Filtré"	
9	4 March	Timal & Gazo	"Filtré"	
10	11 March	Stromae	"L'enfer"	
11	18 March	Aya Nakamura featuring Damso	"Dégaine"	
12	25 March	Aya Nakamura featuring Damso	"Dégaine"	
13	1 April	Disiz featuring Damso	"Recontre"	
14	8 April	Disiz featuring Damso	"Recontre"	
15	15 April	Disiz featuring Damso	"Recontre"	
16	22 April	Disiz featuring Damso	"Recontre"	
17	29 April	Harry Styles	"As It Was"	
18	6 May	Soolking	"Suavemente"	
19	13 May	Soolking	"Suavemente"	
20	20 May	Gazo	"Celine 3x"	
21	27 May	Alonzo featuring Ninho & Naps	"Tout va bien"	
22	3 June	Alonzo featuring Ninho & Naps	"Tout va bien"	
23	10 June	Alonzo featuring Ninho & Naps	"Tout va bien"	
24	17 June	Alonzo featuring Ninho & Naps	"Tout va bien"	
25	24 June	Alonzo featuring Ninho & Naps	"Tout va bien"	
26	1 July	Fresh	"Chop"	
27	8 July	Fresh	"Chop"	
28	15 July	Fresh	"Chop"	
29	22 July	Zeg P featuring SCH & Hamza	"Fade Up"	
30	29 July	Zeg P featuring SCH & Hamza	"Fade Up"	
31	5 August	Gambi	"Petete"	
32	12 August	Zeg P featuring SCH & Hamza	"Fade Up"	
33	19 August	Gazo	"Die"	
34	26 August	Gazo	"Die"	
35	2 September	Gazo	"Die"	
36	9 September	Gazo	"Die"	
37	16 September	Gazo	"Die"	
38	23 September	Gazo	"Die"	
39	30 September	Gazo	"Die"	
40	7 October	Gazo	"Die"	
41	14 October	Gazo	"Die"	
42	21 October	Gazo	"Die"	
43	28 October	Gazo	"Die"	
44	4 November	SCH	"Lif"	
45	11 November	Gazo	"Die"	
46	18 November	Gazo	"Die"	
47	25 November	Zola	"Amber"	
48	2 December	Zola	"Amber"	
49	9 December	Zola	"Amber"	
50	16 December	Zola	"Amber"	
51	23 December	Central Cee	"Let Go"	
52	30 December	Mariah Carey	"All I Want for Christmas Is You"	

=== Albums chart ===
Week	Issue date	Artist(s)	Album	Ref.
1	7 January	Ninho	Jefe	
2	14 January	Ninho	Jefe	
3	21 January	Orelsan	Civilisation	
4	28 January	Jazzy Bazz	Memoria	
5	4 February	Kaaris and Kalash Criminel	SVR	
6	11 February	Vald	V	
7	18 February	Vald	V	
8	25 February	Orelsan	Civilisation	
9	4 March	Orelsan	Civilisation	
10	11 March	Stromae	Multitude	
11	18 March	Les Enfoirés	2022: Un air d'Enfoirés	
12	25 March	Josman	M.A.N (Black Roses & Lost Feelings)	
13	1 April	Stromae	Multitude	
14	8 April	Red Hot Chili Peppers	Unlimited Love	
15	15 April	Stromae	Multitude	
16	22 April	Green Montana	Nostalgia+	
17	29 April	Ninho	Jefe	
18	6 May	Rammstein	Zeit	
19	13 May	Renaud	Métèque	
20	20 May	Dadju	Cullinan	
21	27 May	Harry Styles	Harry's House	
22	3 June	Tiakola	Mélo	
23	10 June	Jul	Extraterrestre	
24	17 June	S-Crew	SZR2001	
25	24 June	Jul	Extraterrestre	
26	1 July	Bigflo & Oli	Les Autres C’est Nous	
27	8 July	Gazo	KMT	
28	15 July	Keen'V	Diamant	
29	22 July	Gazo	KMT	
30	29 July	Gazo	KMT	
31	5 August	Beyoncé	Renaissance	
32	12 August	Gazo	KMT	
33	19 August	Gazo	KMT	
34	26 August	Gazo	KMT	
35	2 September	Muse	Will of the People	
36	9 September	Slimane	Chroniques d'un Cupidon	
37	16 September	Benjamin Biolay	Saint-Clair	
38	23 September	Lomepal	Mauvais ordre	
39	30 September	Lomepal	Mauvais ordre	
40	7 October	Lomepal	Mauvais ordre	
41	14 October	Lomepal	Mauvais ordre	
42	21 October	Red Hot Chili Peppers	Return of the Dream Canteen	
43	28 October	Taylor Swift	Midnights	
44	4 November	Orelsan	Civilisation	
45	11 November	Dinos	Hiver à Paris	
46	18 November	Kendji Girac	L'École de la Vie	
47	25 November	SCH	Autobahn	
48	2 December	Mylène Farmer	L'Emprise	
49	9 December	Lorenzo	Légende vivante	
50	16 December	Jul	Cœur Blanc	
51	23 December	Jul	Cœur Blanc	
52	30 December	Jul	Cœur Blanc	

== See also ==
- 2022 in music
- List of number-one singles in France
- List of top 10 singles in 2022 (France)
