= List of number-one hits of 2023 (France) =

This is a list of the French SNEP Top 200 Singles and Top 200 Albums number-ones of 2023.

== Number ones by week ==
=== Singles chart ===
Week	Issue date	Download + Streaming		
Week	Issue date	Artist(s)	Title	Ref.
1	6 January	Zola	"Amber"	
2	13 January	Maes	"Galactic"	
3	20 January	Gaulois featuring Ninho	"Jolie"	
4	27 January	Miley Cyrus	"Flowers"	
5	3 February	Miley Cyrus	"Flowers"	
6	10 February	Miley Cyrus	"Flowers"	
7	17 February	Miley Cyrus	"Flowers"	
8	24 February	Hamza featuring Damso	"Nocif"	
9	3 March	Hamza featuring Damso	"Nocif"	
10	10 March	Hamza featuring Damso	"Nocif"	
11	17 March	Miley Cyrus	"Flowers"	
12	24 March	Zola	"Coeur De Ice"	
13	31 March	Miley Cyrus	"Flowers"	
14	7 April	Miley Cyrus	"Flowers"	
15	14 April	Miley Cyrus	"Flowers"	
16	21 April	PLK	"Demain"	
17	28 April	PLK	"Demain"	
18	5 May	Naps featuring Gazo and Ninho	"C'est carré le S"	
19	12 May	Ninho	"Freestyle Lvl Up 1"	
20	19 May	No Limit	"La Rue"	
21	26 May	No Limit	"La Rue"	
22	2 June	SDM	"Bolide allemand"	
23	9 June	SDM	"Bolide allemand"	
24	16 June	SDM	"Bolide allemand"	
25	23 June	SDM	"Bolide allemand"	
26	30 June	SDM	"Bolide allemand"	
27	7 July	Ninho featuring Central Cee	"Eurostar"	
28	14 July	Ninho featuring Central Cee	"Eurostar"	
29	21 July	Soolking featuring Gazo	"Casanova"	
30	28 July	Soolking featuring Gazo	"Casanova"	
31	4 August	Soolking featuring Gazo	"Casanova"	
32	11 August	Soolking featuring Gazo	"Casanova"	
33	18 August	Soolking featuring Gazo	"Casanova"	
34	25 August	Soolking featuring Gazo	"Casanova"	
35	1 September	Dave and Tiakola	"Meridian"	
36	8 September	Dave and Tiakola	"Meridian"	
37	15 September	Jungeli featuring Abou Debeing, Alonzo, Lossa and Imen Es	"Petit Génie"	
38	22 September	Jungeli featuring Abou Debeing, Alonzo, Lossa and Imen Es	"Petit Génie"	
39	29 September	Jungeli featuring Abou Debeing, Alonzo, Lossa and Imen Es	"Petit Génie"	
40	6 October	Jungeli featuring Abou Debeing, Alonzo, Lossa and Imen Es	"Petit Génie"	
41	13 October	Jungeli featuring Abou Debeing, Alonzo, Lossa and Imen Es	"Petit Génie"	
42	20 October	Iñigo Quintero	"Si No Estás"	
43	27 October	Iñigo Quintero	"Si No Estás"	
44	3 November	Jungeli featuring Abou Debeing, Alonzo, Lossa and Imen Es	"Petit Génie"	
45	10 November	Jungeli featuring Abou Debeing, Alonzo, Lossa and Imen Es	"Petit Génie"	
46	17 November	Jungeli featuring Abou Debeing, Alonzo, Lossa and Imen Es	"Petit Génie"	
47	24 November	Jungeli featuring Abou Debeing, Alonzo, Lossa and Imen Es	"Petit Génie"	
48	1 December	Jungeli featuring Abou Debeing, Alonzo, Lossa and Imen Es	"Petit Génie"	
49	8 December	Gazo and Tiakola	"Notre Dame"	
50	15 December	Jungeli featuring Abou Debeing, Alonzo, Lossa and Imen Es	"Petit Génie"	
51	22 December	Jungeli featuring Abou Debeing, Alonzo, Lossa and Imen Es	"Petit Génie"	
52	29 December	Mariah Carey	"All I Want for Christmas Is You"	

=== Albums chart ===
Week	Issue date	Artist(s)	Album	Ref.
1	6 January	Jul	Cœur Blanc	
2	13 January	Jul	Cœur Blanc	
3	20 January	Indochine	Central Tour 2022	
4	27 January	Måneskin	Rush!	
5	3 February	Aya Nakamura	DNK	
6	10 February	Aya Nakamura	DNK	
7	17 February	Niro	Taulier	
8	24 February	Hamza	Sincèrement	
9	3 March	Hamza	Sincèrement	
10	10 March	Les Enfoirés	2023: Enfoirés un jour, toujours	
11	17 March	Les Enfoirés	2023: Enfoirés un jour, toujours	
12	24 March	Zola	Diamant du Bled	
13	31 March	Depeche Mode	Memento Mori	
14	7 April	Depeche Mode	Memento Mori	
15	14 April	Djadja & Dinaz	Alpha	
16	21 April	Metallica	72 Seasons	
17	28 April	Agust D	D-Day	
18	5 May	Naps	En temps réel	
19	12 May	Ed Sheeran	−	
20	19 May	Étienne Daho	Tirer la nuit sur les étoiles	
21	26 May	Luv Resval	Mustafar	
22	2 June	Werenoi	Carré	
23	9 June	Stray Kids	5-Star	
24	16 June	Jul	C'est quand qu'il s'éteint ?	
25	23 June	Jul	C'est quand qu'il s'éteint ?	
26	30 June	Jul	C'est quand qu'il s'éteint ?	
27	7 July	Ninho	NI	
28	14 July	Ninho	NI	
29	21 July	Ninho	NI	
30	28 July	Ninho	NI	
31	4 August	Travis Scott	Utopia	
32	11 August	Ninho	NI	
33	18 August	Ninho	NI	
34	25 August	Ninho	NI	
35	1 September	Ninho	NI	
36	8 September	Florent Pagny	2bis	
37	15 September	Calogero	A.M.O.U.R	
38	22 September	Freeze Corleone	ADC	
39	29 September	Werenoi	Telegram 2	
40	6 October	Niaks	Mandat de Dépôt	
41	13 October	Vitaa	Charlotte	
42	20 October	Favé	Il le fallait	
43	27 October	The Rolling Stones	Hackney Diamonds	
44	3 November	Taylor Swift	1989 (Taylor's Version)	
45	10 November	Jungkook	Golden	
46	17 November	Vianney	À 2 à 3	
47	24 November	Johnny Hallyday	Made in Rock'n'Roll	
48	1 December	Florent Pagny	2bis	
49	8 December	Gazo and Tiakola	La Melo est Gangx	
50	15 December	Jul	Le route est longue	
51	22 December	Jul	Le route est longue	
52	29 December	Jul	Le route est longue	

== See also ==
- 2023 in music
- List of number-one singles in France
- List of top 10 singles in 2023 (France)
