= La Reine =

La Reine can refer to

== Organizations ==
- Régiment de La Reine, a regiment of the French Army of the Ancien Régime

== Places ==
- La Reine, Quebec, a municipality in Quebec, Canada
- La Reine, a populated place in the commune of Saint-Priest-des-Champs, Puy-de-Dôme, France
- La Reine, U.S. Virgin Islands

== See also ==
- Reine, Norway
- "Reine" (song)
