= List of top 10 singles in 2022 (France) =

This is a list of singles that have peaked in the top 10 of the French Singles Chart in 2022. 71 singles were in the Top 10 this year which 10 were on the number-one spot.

== Top 10 singles ==
Key

Symbol	Meaning
◁	Indicates single's top 10 entry was also its French Singles Chart top 100 debut

Artist(s)	Single	Peak	Peak date	Weeks at #1	Ref.
Swedish House Mafia and The Weeknd	"Moth to a Flame"	10	9 January	-	
Imagine Dragons	"Wrecked"	2	16 January	-	
Stromae	"L'enfer" ◁	1	16 January	11	
The Weeknd	"Sacrifice"	2	23 January	-	
Trei Degete	"Time Time"	5	30 January	-	
Imagine Dragons and JID	"Enemy"	3	30 January	-	
Gayle	"ABCDEFU"	2	30 January	-	
Gabry Ponte, Lum!x and Prezioso	"Thunder"	9	6 February	-	
Rosalía featuring The Weeknd	"La Fama"	5	6 February	-	
Amir	"Rétine"	4	20 February	-	
Jaymes Young	"Infinity"	3	27 February	-	
Madonna and Sickick	"Frozen"	2	6 March	-	
Angèle and Damso	"Démons"	4	13 March	-	
La Zarra	"Tu t'en iras"	3	13 March	-	
Orelsan	"La quête"	4	20 March	-	
Kungs	"Clap Your Hands"	3	27 March	-	
Farruko, Victor Cardenas and Dj Adoni	"El Incomprendido"	2	27 March	-	
Juliette Armanet	"Le dernier jour du disco"	1	27 March	2	
CKay	"Emiliana"	5	3 April	-	
Inna featuring Sean Paul	"Up"	7	10 April	-	
Purple Disco Machine and Sophie and the Giants	"In the Dark"	5	10 April	-	
Willy William	"Trompeta"	4	10 April	-	
Soolking	"Suavemente"	1	10 April	1	
Clara Luciani	"Amour toujours"	8	17 April	-	
Yanns	"Clic clic pan pan"	1	17 April	1	
Pascal Letoublon featuring Leony	"Friendships (Lost My Love)"	8	24 April	-	
Camila Cabello featuring Ed Sheeran	"Bam Bam"	1	24 April	7	
Jimin and Ha Sung-woon	"With You" ◁	7	1 May	-	
Sound of Legend	"Maniac"	4	8 May	-	
Kendrick Lamar	"The Heart Part 5" ◁	8	15 May	-	
Patrick Fiori, Patrick Bruel, Florent Pagny and Jean-Charles Papi	"Terra Corsa" ◁	10	29 May	-	
Alonzo featuring Ninho and Naps	"Tout va bien" ◁	7	29 May	-	
Mentissa	"Et bam !"	3	29 May	-	
Harry Styles	"As It Was"	1	29 May	3	
Lady Gaga	"Hold My Hand"	3	5 June	-	
DJ Snake	"Disco Maghreb"	8	19 June	-	
Rema	"Calm Down"	1	19 June	16	
Slimane	"La recette"	9	3 July	-	
Beyoncé	"Break My Soul"	8	3 July	-	
Fresh	"Chop"	8	10 July	-	
Boris Way	"Running Up That Hill"	6	10 July	-	
Keen'V	"Outété"	10	17 July	-	
The Avener and Waldeck featuring Patrizia Ferrara	"Quando Quando"	5	17 July	-	
Zeg P featuring Hamza and Sch	"Fade Up"	7	21 August	-	
Elton John and Britney Spears	"Hold Me Closer"	6	4 September	-	
Mylène Farmer	"À tout jamais"	4	4 September	-	
Benjamin Biolay	"Rends l'amour"	8	18 September	-	
Lofie	"Lofi Chad" ◁	1	18 September	1	
Black Eyed Peas featuring Shakira and David Guetta	"Don't You Worry"	3	25 September	-	
Adé	"Tout savoir"	5	2 October	-	
Rosalía	"Despechá"	3	9 October	-	
David Guetta and Bebe Rexha	"I'm Good (Blue)"	1	9 October	1	
Vianney and Ed Sheeran	"Call on Me"	3	16 October	-	
Beyoncé	"Cuff It"	6	23 October	-	
OneRepublic	"I Ain't Worried"	4	23 October	-	
Star Academy	"Ne partez pas sans moi" ◁	2	30 October	-	
Orelsan and Angèle	"Évidemment" ◁	7	6 November	-	
Rihanna	"Lift Me Up"	1	6 November	11	
Juliette Armanet	"Flamme"	9	13 November	-	
Sam Smith and Kim Petras	"Unholy"	6	13 November	-	
Christophe Willem	"PS : je t'aime"	5	13 November	-	
La petite culotte	"La goffa Lolita"	2	13 November	-	
Rosa Linn	"Snap"	5	20 November	-	
Slimane	"Des milliers de je t'aime"	2	20 November	-	
Aime Simone	"Shining Light"	3	27 November	-	
Jungkook featuring Fahad Al Kubaisi	"Dreamers" ◁	2	27 November	-	
Anisha	"De là-haut" ◁	6	4 December	-	
Claudio Capéo	"Si j'avais su"	4	4 December	-	
-M- and Gail Ann Dorsey	"À toi"	10	11 December	-	
Calema and DJ Youcef	"Te amo"	9	11 December	-	
Måneskin	"The Loneliest"	2	18 December	-	

== Entries by artists ==
The following table shows artists who achieved two or more top 10 entries in 2022. The figures include both main artists and featured artists and the peak position in brackets.

Entries	Artist	Singles
3	The Weeknd	"Moth to a Flame" (10), "Sacrifice" (2), "La Fama" (5)
2	Angèle	"Démons" (4), "Évidemment" (7)
2	Beyoncé	"Break My Soul" (8), "Cuff It" (6)
2	David Guetta	"Don't You Worry" (3), "I'm Good (Blue)" (1)
2	Ed Sheeran	"Bam Bam" (1), "Call on Me" (3)
2	Imagine Dragons	"Wrecked" (2), "Enemy" (3)
2	Juliette Armanet	"Le dernier jour du disco" (1), "Flamme" (9)
2	Orelsan	"La quête" (4), "Évidemment" (7)
2	Rosalía	"La Fama" (5), "Despechá" (3)
2	Slimane	"La recette" (9), "Des milliers de je t'aime" (2)

== See also ==
- 2022 in music
- List of number-one hits of 2022 (France)
