= Django (Dadju song) =

2018 song by Dadju

Single by Dadju featuring Franglish

from the album Gentleman 2.0
- Released: 2018
- Recorded: 2017
- Length: 4:09
- Label: Amaterasu
- Songwriters: Djuna Nsungula; Franglish
- Producer: E Kelly

Dadju featuring Franglish singles chronology
"J'ai dit non" (2017)	"Django" (2018)	"Bob Marley" (2018)

Music video
- "Django" on YouTube

"Django" is a song by French singer Dadju featuring vocals from French rapper Franglish. It peaked at number 16 in the SNEP singles chart in France.

== Charts ==
Chart performance for "Django"
Chart	Peak position
Belgium (Ultratop 50 Wallonia)	35
France (SNEP)	16
