= Compliqué =

Single by Dadju

from the album Poison ou Antidote
- Released: 28 June 2019
- Recorded: 2019
- Length: 3:33
- Songwriters: Djuna Nsungula, MKL
- Producer: MKL

Dadju singles chronology
"Jaloux" (2018)	"Compliqué" (2019)	"Ma vie" (2019)

Music video
- "Compliqué" on YouTube

"Compliqué" is a song by Dadju from his album Poison ou Antidote. It was released on 28 June 2019.

== Charts ==
=== Weekly charts ===
Chart performance for "Compliqué"
Chart (2019)	Peak position
Belgium (Ultratop 50 Wallonia)	41
France (SNEP)	6
Switzerland (Schweizer Hitparade)	86

=== Year-end charts ===
Year-end chart performance for "Compliqué"
Chart (2019)	Position
France (SNEP)	29

== Certifications ==
Region	Certification	Certified units/sales
France (SNEP)	Diamond	333,333^{‡}
^{‡} Sales+streaming figures based on certification alone.
