= Ma vie =

Ma vie may refer to:

- "Ma vie" (Amine song), released in 2005
- "Ma vie" (Dadju song), released in 2019
- "Ma vie", a 1964 song by Alain Barrière
- Ma vie, a 1964 album by Alain Barrière
