= Balader (song) =

Single by Soolking featuring Niska

from the album Sans visa
- Language: French
- Released: 27 May 2022
- Genre: Urban pop, drill
- Length: 2:56
- Songwriter: Soolking
- Producer: William Thomas

Music video
- "Balader" on YouTube

"Balader" is a song by Algerian singer Soolking featuring with French rapper Niska released in May 2022, produced by William Thomas. The song peaked at number two on the French Singles Chart.

== Music video ==
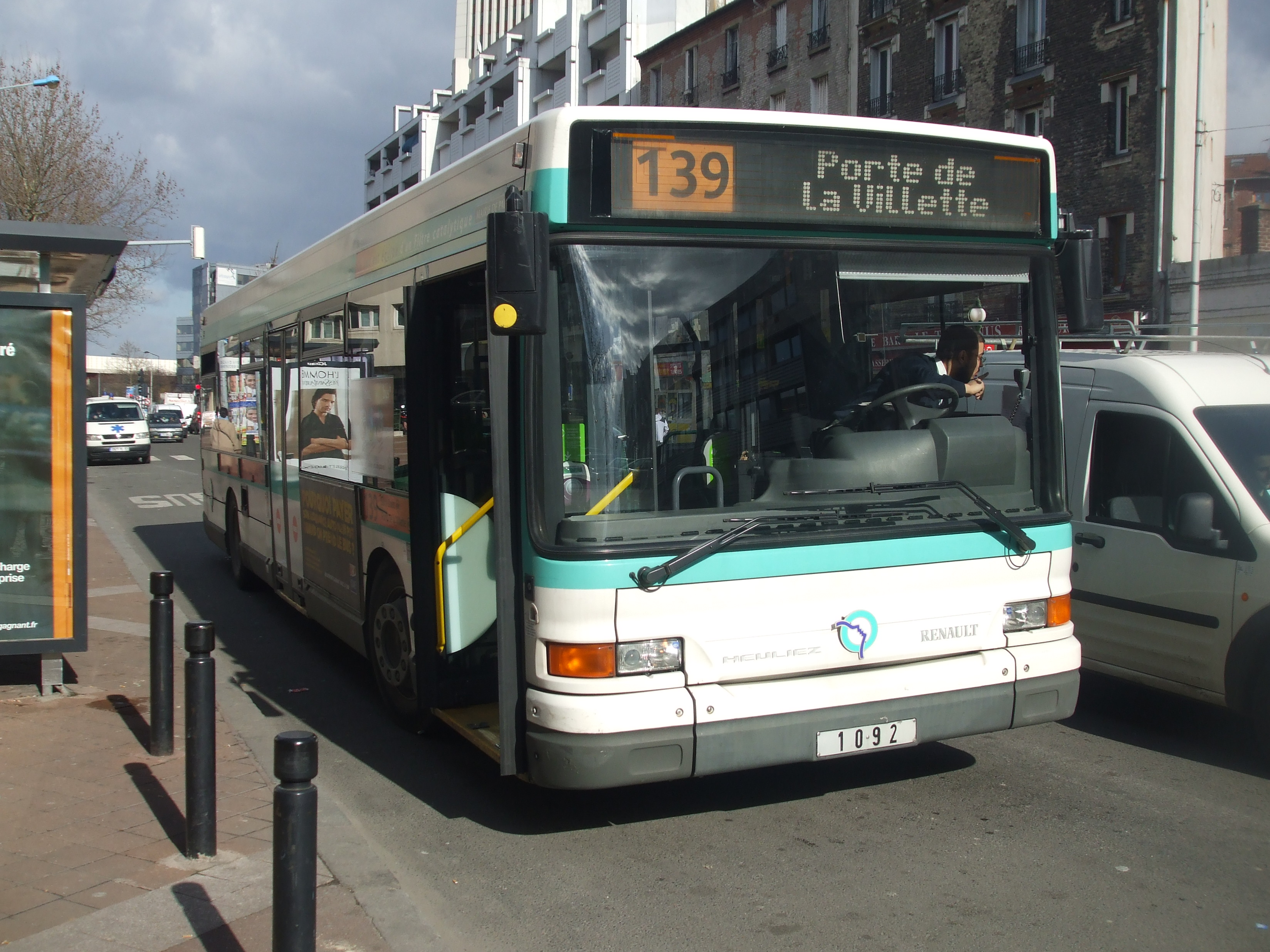
A preserved-Heuliez GX 317 from RATP appears in the music video.

Balader was released on June 22, 2023 on YouTube, the video was produced by William Thomas and filmed in Lésigny, the music video shows Soolking moved in his new house, celebrating this by a housewarming party with Niska and many friends. Many motors and a ex-RATP preserved Heuliez GX 317 appears in the video.

== Charts ==
Chart performance for "Balader"
Chart (2022)	Peak position
Belgium (Ultratop 50 Wallonia)	22
France (SNEP)	2
Switzerland (Schweizer Hitparade)	72

== Certifications ==
Certifications for "Balader"
Region	Certification	Certified units/sales
Belgium (BRMA)	Platinum	40,000^{‡}
France (SNEP)	Diamond	333,333^{‡}
^{‡} Sales+streaming figures based on certification alone.
