= Le temps (song) =

Single by Tayc

from the album Fleur froide
- Released: 26 February 2021
- Recorded: 2020
- Genre: R&B
- Length: 3:16
- Label: H24
- Songwriter: Tayc
- Producer: Nyadjiko

Tayc singles chronology
| "Parle-moi" (2021) | "Le temps" (2021) | "Dis moi comment." (2021) |

Music video
- "Le Temps" on YouTube

"Le temps" is a song by French-Cameroonian singer Tayc. It was released as the fifth single from him album Fleur froide.

== Charts ==
=== Weekly charts ===
| Chart (2020) | Peak position |
|---|---|
| Belgium (Ultratip Bubbling Under Flanders) | 38 |
| Belgium (Ultratop 50 Wallonia) | 7 |
| France (SNEP) | 1 |
| Switzerland (Schweizer Hitparade) | 10 |

=== Year-end charts ===
| Chart (2021) | Position |
|---|---|
| France (SNEP) | 7 |
| Belgium (Ultratop Wallonia) | 54 |

== Certifications ==
| Region | Certification | Certified units/sales |
|---|---|---|
| France (SNEP) | Diamond | 333,333^{‡} |
| Belgium (BRMA) | Gold | 20,000^{‡} |
^{‡} Sales+streaming figures based on certification alone.
