= Guérilla (song) =

2018 single by Soolking

Single by Soolking

from the album Fruit du démon
- Language: French
- Released: 23 January 2018 (YouTube); 23 February 2018 (streaming)
- Recorded: 2017
- Studio: Studio de l'étoile (Paris, France)
- Genre: Pop-rap
- Length: 3:49
- Label: Affranchis; Hyper Focal
- Songwriters: Abderraouf Derradji; Diias
- Producer: Diias

Soolking singles chronology
"Milano" (2018)	"Guérilla" (2018)	"Dalida" (2018)

"Guérilla" is a song by Algerian rapper Soolking. It was released as the lead single from his debut album Fruit du démon, on 23 January 2018 through Affranchis and Hyper Focal.

== Background ==
In an interview, Soolking said that he composed the song in a car with his friends.

== Live performance ==
In January 2018, Soolking performed Guérilla on Planète Rap on the French radio station Skyrock and was uploaded to YouTube. The video garnered over 280 million views and it is Skyrock's most-viewed video.

== Charts ==
Chart	Peak position
Belgium (Ultratip Bubbling Under Wallonia)	13
France (SNEP)	33

== Certifications ==
Region	Certification	Certified units/sales
France (SNEP)	Diamond	333,333^{‡}
^{‡} Sales+streaming figures based on certification alone.
