= 1ère fois =

Single by Imen Es featuring Alonzo

from the album Nos vies
- Released: March 25, 2020
- Recorded: February 14, 2020
- Length: 2:37
- Label: Fulgu
- Songwriter(s): Imen Essrhir; Kassimou Djae; Abou Debeing; Zaka2054
- Producer(s): Abys One

Imen Es singles chronology
"Mon bébé" (2020)	"1ère fois" (2020)	"Jusqu'au bout" (2020)

Alonzo singles chronology
"10/10" (2019)	"1ère fois" (2020)	"F.L.P" (2020)

Music video
- 1ère fois on YouTube

"1ère fois" is a song by French singer Imen Es featuring French rapper Alonzo. It was released on March 25, 2020.

== Music video ==
As of November 2022, the music video for 1ère fois had over 117 million views on YouTube.

== Charts ==
Chart (2020)	Peak position
Belgium (Ultratip Bubbling Under Wallonia)	7
France (SNEP)	11

=== Certifications ===
Region	Certification	Certified units/sales
France (SNEP)	Diamond	333,333^{‡}
^{‡} Sales+streaming figures based on certification alone.
