= Franglish (rapper) =

French rapper

- Franglish in 2025

Background information
- Born: 2 August 1994 (age 32); Ménilmontant, Paris, France
- Genres: Hip hop; R&B
- Occupations: Rapper; singer
- Years active: 2013–present
- Label: Brownie Dubz Gang

Gédéon Mundele Ngolo (French pronunciation: [ʒedeɔ̃ mundele (ɛŋ)ɡɔlo]; born 2 August 1994), better known by his stage name Franglish, is a French rapper and singer.

== Life and Career ==
Originating from the 20th arrondissement of Paris and of Congolese origin, he was passionate about hip hop, rap, and French and American R&B. After seeing his beginnings, Brownie Dubz Gang collective started calling him Mr. Franglish because of his mixed freestyle. He collaborated greatly with the rap group BFBC originating from Montfermeil. In 2013, he released his own Franglish Prototype, followed in 2017 with a second mixtape Changement d'ambiance and a third in 2017 as Signature. His album Monsieur reached number 16 on the French Albums chart in 2019. His biggest single hit was "My Salsa" featuring Tory Lanez.

== Discography ==
=== Albums ===
| Title | Album details | Peak positions | | | | Certification |
| Title | Album details | FRA | BEL (Fl) | BEL (Wa) | SWI | Certification |
|---|---|---|---|---|---|---|
| Monsieur | Released: 5 April 2019; Label: Universal; Format: CD, digital download, streaming | 16 | — | 57 | 99 | SNEP: Platinum |
| Vibe | Released: 9 July 2021; Label: Capitol; Format: Digital download, streaming | 3 | 176 | 14 | 40 | SNEP: Gold |
| Glish | Released: 28 October 2022; Label: Capitol; Format: Digital download, streaming | 6 | — | 21 | 48 | SNEP: Platinum |
| Prime | Released: 5 March 2024; Label: Lutèce Music; Format: Digital download, streaming | 9 | — | 39 | 49 | SNEP: Gold |
| Aura | Released: 11 April 2025; Label: Lutèce Music; Format: Digital download, streaming | 3 | — | 29 | 49 | SNEP: Gold |
| Love & Sugar | Released: 6 March 2026; Label: Lutèce Music; Format: Digital download, streaming | 37 | — | 41 | 60 | |
"—" denotes a recording that did not chart or was not released in that territory.

=== Mixtapes ===
| Title | Album details | Peak positions | | Certification |
| Title | Album details | FRA | BEL (Wa) | Certification |
|---|---|---|---|---|
| Franglish Prototype | Released: 16 September 2013; Label: Lutèce Music; Format: Digital download, streaming | — | — | |
| Changement d'ambiance | Released: 16 February 2015; Label: Lutèce Music; Format: Digital download, streaming | — | — | |
| Signature | Released: 10 November 2017; Label: Lutèce Music; Format: Digital download, streaming | 144 | 187 | |
| Mood | Released: 12 June 2020; Label: Def Jam / Island; Format: Digital download, streaming | — | — | |
| Mood 2 | Released: 25 March 2022; Label: Lutèce Music; Format: Digital download, streaming | — | — | SNEP: Gold |
| Mood 3 | Released: 2 June 2023; Label: Lutèce Music; Format: Digital download, streaming | 17 | 77 | |
"—" denotes a recording that did not chart or was not released in that territory.

=== Singles ===
| Title | Year | Peak positions | | Certifications | Album |
| Title | Year | FRA | BEL (Wa) | Certifications | Album |
|---|---|---|---|---|---|
| "C'est plus l'heure" (featuring Dadju and Vegedream) | 2016 | — | — | SNEP: Gold | Signature |
| "Plus rien" (featuring KeBlack) | 2018 | 185 | — | | Monsieur |
| "My Salsa" (solo or featuring Tory Lanez) | 2020 | 5 | 35 | SNEP: Diamond | Mood |
| "Baby Mama" | 2021 | 106 | — | SNEP: Gold | Vibe |
| "Trucs de choses" (with Gradur) | 2021 | 22 | — | SNEP: Diamond | Non-album single |
| "Big Drip" (featuring Gazo) | 2022 | 60 | — | | Mood 2 |
| "La calle" (featuring Koba LaD) | 2022 | 33 | — | | Mood 2 |
| "Mano" | 2022 | 96 | — | SNEP: Gold | Mood 3 |
| "Sécu" | 2022 | 16 | — | SNEP: Gold | Non-album singles |
| "Dans la chambre/Money" | 2023 | 62 | — | SNEP: Platinum | Non-album singles |
| "DJO" (with Aya Nakamura) | 2023 | 18 | — | | Mood 3 |
| "Trop parler" | 2023 | 64 | — | SNEP: Platinum | Mood 3 |
| "Ca c'est bien" | 2023 | 71 | — | | Mood 3 |
| "Position" | 2024 | 3 | 45 | SNEP: Diamond | Prime |
| "Génération impolie" (with KeBlack) | 2025 | 5 | 15 | SNEP: Gold | Non-album single |
"—" denotes a recording that did not chart or was not released in that territory.

=== Featured singles ===
| Title | Year | Peak positions | | Certifications | Album |
| Title | Year | FRA | BEL (Wa) | Certifications | Album |
|---|---|---|---|---|---|
| "Django" (Dadju featuring Franglish) | 2017 | 16 | 35 | SNEP: Platinum | Gentleman 2.0 |
| "Fiable" (Eva featuring Franglish) | 2019 | 156 | — | | Queen |
| "Go" (Gazo featuring Franglish and Landy) | 2021 | 37 | — | SNEP: Gold | Drill FR |
| "Mayday" (Alonzo featuring Franglish) | 2021 | 139 | — | | Capo dei capi - Vol. II & III |
| "Excuse My French" (L'Algérino featuring Franglish) | 2021 | 135 | — | | Moonlight |
| "Comme avant" (Lynda featuring Franglish) | 2021 | 154 | — | | Papillon (Réédition) |
"—" denotes a recording that did not chart or was not released in that territory.

=== Other charted songs ===
| Title | Year | Peak positions | Certifications | Album |
| Title | Year | FRA | Certifications | Album |
|---|---|---|---|---|
| "DSL" (Imen Es featuring Franglish) | 2020 | 132 | | Nos vies |
| "Biberon" | 2020 | 69 | | Mood |
| "Ex" | 2020 | 140 | SNEP: Gold | Mood |
| "Mauvais garçon" | 2020 | 64 | | Mood |
| "Bonnie & Clyde" | 2021 | 152 | | Vibe |
| "Sans moi" (featuring Aya Nakamura) | 2021 | 41 | SNEP: Gold | Vibe |
| "Glish vs Glish" | 2021 | 153 | | Vibe |
| "Peur d'aimer" | 2021 | 176 | SNEP: Gold | Vibe |
| "Nuit blanche" | 2021 | 188 | | Vibe |
| "Slide" (with Hamza) | 2021 | 141 | | Vibe |
| "Jolie" (Negrito featuring Franglish) | 2021 | 110 | | Le Bien ou le Mal |
| "Black Card" (Tayc featuring MHD and Franglish) | 2021 | 76 | | Fleur froide - Second état : la cristallisation |
| "No More Drama" (Joé Dwèt Filé featuring Franglish) | 2022 | 198 | | Calypso : Winter Edition |
| "La Pluie" (featuring Dinos) | 2025 | 24 | SNEP: Gold | |
"—" denotes a recording that did not chart or was not released in that territory.
