= My Salsa =

2021 single by Franglish featuring Tory Lanez

Single by Franglish featuring Tory Lanez
- Released: 26 June 2020
- Recorded: 2020
- Length: 3:30
- Songwriter(s): Daystar Peterson; Gédéon Mundele Ngolo; Tommy Djib
- Producer(s): Franglish; Tommy Djib

Franglish singles chronology
"Mauvais garçon" (2020)	"My Salsa" (2020)

Tory Lanez singles chronology
"Whats Poppin (remix)" (2020)	"My Salsa" (2020)

"My Salsa" is a song by the French rapper Franglish featuring Canadian rapper Tory Lanez released in 2020.

== Charts ==
=== Weekly charts ===
Chart (2020)	Peak position
Belgium (Ultratop 50 Wallonia)	36
France (SNEP)	5

=== Year-end charts ===
Chart (2020)	Position
France (SNEP)	33
