= Attentat (song) =

Single by Imen Es
- Released: November 23, 2018
- Recorded: 2018
- Length: 3:11
- Label: Fulgu
- Songwriter(s): Abou Debeing; Imen Essrhir
- Producer(s): DJ Erise; Abou Debeing

Imen Es singles chronology
"Attentat" (2018)	"Je sais" (2019)

Music video
- Attentat on YouTube

"Attentat" is a song by French singer Imen Es, released on November 23, 2018 as her debut, non-album single.

== Music video ==
As of January 2025, the music video for Attentat had over 79 million views on YouTube.

== Charts ==
Chart (2019)	Peak position
Belgium (Ultratip Bubbling Under Wallonia)	4
France (SNEP)	23

=== Certifications ===
Region	Certification	Certified units/sales
France (SNEP)	Platinum	200,000^{‡}
^{‡} Sales+streaming figures based on certification alone.
