= La Reine, U.S. Virgin Islands =

Coordinates: 17°43′58″N 64°46′25″W

La Reine, United States Virgin Islands
- Village
- Interactive map of La Reine, United States Virgin Islands
- Country: United States Virgin Islands
- Island: Saint Croix
- Time zone: UTC-4 (AST)

La Reine is a settlement on the island of Saint Croix in the United States Virgin Islands.

== History ==
La Reine is a former sugar cane plantation. It was for a while owned by bailiff and scribe (Danish: Bygoged and skriver) in Frederiksted Wilfelm Schæffer (died July 1884).
