= Vaitimbora =

Single by Trinix and Mari Froes

from the album Origin
- Released: 2 May 2025
- Length: 2:15
- Label: RCA; Sony
- Songwriters: Josh Chergui; Lois Serre; Mariana Froes; Seu Pereira
- Producer: Trinix

Trinix singles chronology
"Narina" (2025)	"Vaitimbora" (2025)	"Aje" (2025)

Music video
- "Vaitimbora" on YouTube

"Vaitimbora" is a song written by Brazilian musician Seu Pereira and originally recorded by Brazilian singer Polyana Resende. A rendition by singer-songwriter Mari Froes was later remixed by French electronic music duo Trinix and released in May 2025 by RCA Records and Sony Music, from Trinix's fourth studio album, Origin (2025).

The song's title is a contraction of "Vai-te embora", which translates to "go away".

== Trinix remix ==
The collaboration between the artists came about after Froes went viral on social media with a video of herself singing a snippet of the original version of the song, giving Trinix the idea to remix it. After its release, the track became popular on TikTok and Instagram, with users creating videos on the theme of escape.

=== Production ===
The song evokes a summery vibe, blending elements of electronic music with Brazilian influences. It has been described as "a lush fusion of MPB-inspired melodies and sleek electronic production".

=== Weekly charts ===
Weekly chart performance for "Vaitimbora"
Chart (2025)	Peak position
Belgium (Ultratop 50 Flanders)	19
Belgium (Ultratop 50 Wallonia)	47
France (SNEP)	23
Greece International (IFPI)	71
Luxembourg (Billboard)	20
Netherlands (Single Top 100)	45
Portugal (AFP)	39
Switzerland (Schweizer Hitparade)	25

=== Year-end charts ===
Year-end chart performance for "Vaitimbora"
Chart (2025)	Position
Belgium (Ultratop 50 Wallonia)	183
Switzerland (Schweizer Hitparade)	72

=== Certifications ===
Certifications and sales for "Vaitimbora"
Region	Certification	Certified units/sales
Belgium (BRMA)	Gold	20,000^{‡}
France (SNEP)	Platinum	200,000^{‡}
Hungary (MAHASZ)	Gold	2,000^{‡}
Portugal (AFP)	Gold	12,000^{‡}
Switzerland (IFPI Switzerland)	Gold	15,000^{‡}
^{‡} Sales+streaming figures based on certification alone.
