= Meleğim =

2020 single by Soolking feat. Dadju

Single by Soolking featuring Dadju

from the album Vintage
- Language: French
- Released: 7 February 2020
- Recorded: 2019
- Length: 3:41
- Label: Affranchis; Hyper Focal
- Songwriters: Djuna Nsungula; Abderraouf Derradji; Raphaël Nyadjiko
- Producer: Nyadjiko

Soolking singles chronology
"Bébé allô" (2019)	"Meleğim" (2020)	"Hayati" (2020)

Dadju singles chronology
"10/10" (2020)	"Meleğim" (2020)	"Bobo au coeur" (2020)

Music video
- "Meleğim" on YouTube

edit

"Meleğim" (transl. My angel) is a song by the French-Algerian singer Soolking featuring the French singer Dadju. It was released on 7 February 2020. It was written by Dadju, Soolking and Raphaël Nyadjiko. Nyadjiko also produced the song.

== Charts ==
=== Weekly charts ===
Weekly chart performance for "Meleğim"
Chart (2020)	Peak position
Belgium (Ultratip Bubbling Under Flanders)	41
Belgium (Ultratop 50 Wallonia)	26
France (SNEP)	2
Switzerland (Schweizer Hitparade)	52

=== Year-end charts ===
Year-end chart performance for "Meleğim"
Chart (2020)	Position
France (SNEP)	14

== Certifications ==
Certifications for "Meleğim"
Region	Certification	Certified units/sales
Belgium (BRMA)	Gold	20,000^{‡}
France (SNEP)	Diamond	333,333^{‡}
^{‡} Sales+streaming figures based on certification alone.
