= Imen Es =

French singer

- Born: Imen Essrhir; 3 June 1998 (age 28); Sevran, France
- Genres: Pop; R&B; urban pop; hip-hop; raï
- Occupation: Singer
- Instrument: Vocals
- Years active: 2018–present
- Labels: Fulgu; TuneCore; Universal
- Website: imenes.shop

Imen Essrhir better known as Imen Es (born 3 June 1998 in Sevran) is a French singer. In 2020 she released her debut album Nos vies. She has many collaborations and singles most notably "1ère fois" certified diamond.

== Career ==
She was born to Moroccan immigrants coming from Meknès, Morocco. She grew up in Sevran and was initially involved in football and boxing. After releasing videos online, she was supported by French rapper Abou Debeing, who became her producer. The two released "Mes défauts" in 2018. She also collaborated with Lartiste and DJ Kayz in "Fonce". Then she launched a solo career with her first major hit in "Attentat". On 14 February 2020, she released her debut album Nos vies with 20 tracks and collaborations with Dadju, Alonzo, Marwa Loud, Abou Debeing, Jul and Franglish. Other releases included collaborations with Kaaris, Da Uzi, DJ Hamida, Benab and many others. Her biggest hit is "1ère fois" with Alonzo that was certified platinum. On 3 December 2021, Imen released her second album entitled ES with 14 tracks and collaborations with Niro, Vitaa, MHD, Camille Lellouche, Abou Debeing and Fedoua Es.

On 8 May 2021, she had her first child, a boy named Djibril.

== Discography ==
=== Albums ===
Title	Year	Peak positions		Certification
Title	Year	FRA	BEL (Wa)	Certification
Nos vies	2020	5	23	SNEP: Platinum
Es	2021	14	63	
Train de vie	2023	5	48	

=== Singles ===
Year	Title	Peak positions		Certification	Album
Year	Title	FRA	BEL (Wa)	Certification	Album
2018	"Attentat"	23	4 (Ultratip)	FRA: Platinum	Non-album release
2020	"1ère fois" (feat. Alonzo)	11	7 (Ultratip)	FRA: Diamond	Nos vies
2020	"Jusqu'au bout" (with Amel Bent)	47	6	FRA: Gold	Nos vies
2021	"Essaie encore"	5	—	FRA: Platinum	Es
2021	"Fantôme"	9	—		Es

=== Featured in ===
Year	Title	Peak positions		Certification	Album
Year	Title	FRA	BEL (Wa)	Certification	Album
2018	"Mes défauts" (Abou Debeing feat. Imen Es)	133	—		Non-album release
2020	"Lumière" (Kaaris feat. Imen Es)	46	—		2.7.0
2020	"Unité" (with Dadju, Hatik, Soolking)	59	27 (Ultratip)		Non-album release
2020	"Dernière fois" (Alonzo feat. Imen Es)	41	—		Capo dei capi - Vol. II & III
2020	"Maladie" (Benab feat. Imen Es)	50	—		Au clair de la rue (Part. 1)
2020	"Le choix" (Nahir feat. Imen Es)	136	—		Non-album release

=== Other charted songs ===
Year	Title	Peak positions	Certification	Album
Year	Title	FRA	Certification	Album
2019	"Je sais"	117		Non-album release
2019	"Mayday"	157		Nos vies
2019	"Oui"	58		Nos vies
2020	"Je t'aime en silence"	68		Nos vies
2020	"Mon mari"	91		Nos vies
2020	"D'ennemi à bébé"	104		Nos vies
2020	"Mama"	172		Nos vies
2020	"DSL" (featuring Franglish)	132		Nos vies
2020	"Turbulence"	194		Nos vies
2020	"Mon bébé"	200		Nos vies
2020	"Au début"	119		Nos vies
2020	"Fausse sœur"	162		Nos vies
2021	"La Go"	75		Es
2021	"Vendeur de rêve"	136		Es
2021	"Djibril"	147		Es
2021	"Lovés"	168		Es
2021	"Ma chérie"	196		Es
