= Nuit Incolore =

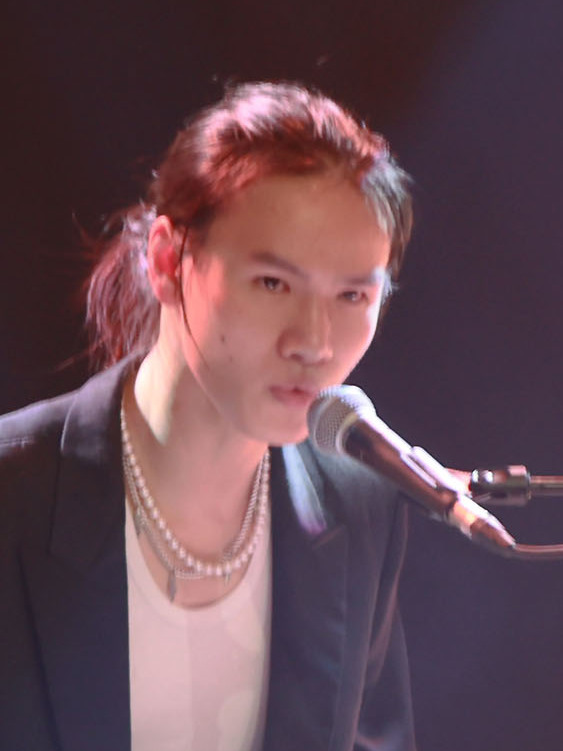

Background information
- Also known as: Nuit Incolore
- Born: Théo Marclay; 2001 (age 24–25); Vietnam
- Genres: Pop, Electronic
- Occupations: Musician, composer, director
- Years active: 2019-present
- Label: Cinq7
- Website: nuitincolore.shop

Théo Marclay (born 2001), known professionally as Nuit Incolore, is a Swiss musician and composer, most known for his song Dépassé, which went Platinum in France. He was named French Speaking Revelation of the Year by the NRJ Music Awards, where he was the first Swiss artist to receive the honor.

== Early life and education ==
He was born in 2001 in Vietnam, but was adopted by a Swiss couple at the age of five months. When growing up, he faced racism because of his Asian ethnicity.

Marclay begun playing piano at the age of seven and went on to study music at the University of Fribourg.

== Career ==
Marclay begun posting videos of his songs on social media at the age of 19, where he received some mild success. In July 2021, he signed with the Cinq7 record label and appeared at the Japan Expo from February 18 to 20, 2022 in Marseille. He made a second appearance at the expo in July 2023. His stage name translates to "Colorless Night".

Marclay held his first concert at Les Étoiles in Paris on October 7, 2022, and held a tour across France, Switzerland, and Belgium in 2023.

His song Dépassé received high praise and has been streamed over 30 million times.

=== Inspiration ===
Marclay has cited the works of Studio Ghibli and the music of Joe Hisaishi as some of his inspirations. In addition, he stated that he looks up to Charles Aznavour and Alfred Hitchcock.

== Discography ==
=== Singles ===
- "Asian Flush" (2020)
- "Je" (2020)
- "Pleurs du soir" (2020)
- "Plume filante" (2021)
- "Astre noir" (2021)
- "Dépassé" (2022)
- "Crush" (2023)
- "Adieux" (2024)
- "On s'écrira" (2024)

=== Albums ===
- Monotonie d'hiver (2020)
- La loi du papillon (2023)
- Re:Naissance Part. 1 (2026)
