= Reine (song) =

Single by Dadju

from the album Gentleman 2.0
- Released: May 5, 2017
- Recorded: 2017
- Genre: Hip-Hop
- Length: 3:19
- Songwriter(s): Djuna Nsungula, Yohann Doumbia
- Producer(s): Dadju

Dadju singles chronology
| "Reine" (2017) | "Gentleman 2.0" (2017) |

Music video
- "Reine" on YouTube

Reine (as known Queen in English) is a song of the French rapper Dadju from the album Gentleman 2.0 was recorded in 2017 and released on May 5, 2017 as the debut single.

== Music video ==
The music video was released on YouTube on May 5, 2017; as of April 2020 the video combined 236 million views.

== Charts ==
| Chart (2017–18) | Peak position |
|---|---|
| Belgium (Ultratop 50 Wallonia) | 36 |
| France (SNEP) | 2 |
| Switzerland (Schweizer Hitparade) | 84 |

== Certifications ==
Certifications for Reine
| Region | Certification | Certified units/sales |
|---|---|---|
| France (SNEP) | Diamond | 233,333^{‡} |
^{‡} Sales+streaming figures based on certification alone.
