= Jaloux (Dadju song) =

2018 song by Dadju

Single by Dadju

from the album Gentleman 2.0
- Released: 5 October 2018
- Recorded: 2018
- Length: 3:54
- Songwriters: Djuna Nsungula, Stan-E Music
- Producer: Dadju

Dadju singles chronology
"Christina" (2018)	"Jaloux" (2018)	"Mafuzzy Style" (2018)

Music video
- "Jaloux" on YouTube

"Jaloux" is a song by French singer Dadju. It was released on 5 October 2018, alongside its music video.

== Charts ==
=== Weekly charts ===
Chart performance for "Jaloux"
Chart (2018)	Peak position
Belgium (Ultratop 50 Wallonia)	17
France (SNEP)	1
Switzerland (Schweizer Hitparade)	37

=== Year-end charts ===
Year-end chart performance for "Jaloux"
Chart (2018)	Position
France (SNEP)	39
Chart (2019)	Position
France (SNEP)	69

== Certifications ==
Region	Certification	Certified units/sales
France (SNEP)	Diamond	333,333^{‡}
^{‡} Sales+streaming figures based on certification alone.
