= Ma vie (Dadju song) =

Single by Dadju

from the album Poison ou Antidote
- Released: 11 October 2019
- Recorded: 2019
- Length: 3:26
- Label: Amaterasu
- Songwriters: Djuna Nsungula; Tommy Djibz
- Producer: Tommy Djibz

Dadju singles chronology
"Compliqué" (2019)	"Ma vie" (2019)	"Confessions" (2019)

Music video
- "Ma vie" on YouTube

"Ma vie" is a song by French singer Dadju from his album Poison ou Antidote. It was released on 11 October 2019.

== Charts ==
=== Weekly charts ===
Chart performance for "Ma vie"
Chart (2019)	Peak position
Belgium (Ultratop 50 Wallonia)	33
France (SNEP)	3

=== Year-end charts ===
Year-end chart performance for "Ma vie"
Chart (2019)	Position
France (SNEP)	147

== Certifications ==
Region	Certification	Certified units/sales
France (SNEP)	Platinum	200,000^{‡}
^{‡} Sales+streaming figures based on certification alone.
