= Casanova (Soolking and Gazo song) =

Single by Soolking featuring Gazo
- Language: French
- Released: 6 July 2023
- Length: 3:10
- Label: Capitol
- Songwriters: Abderraouf Derradji; Ibrahima Diakité; Nassim Diane; Nass Brans
- Producers: Voluptyk; Brans

Music video
- "Casanova" on YouTube

"Casanova" is a song by Algerian singer Soolking featuring French rapper Gazo. It was released on 6 July 2023, produced by Voluptk and Nass Brans. The song peaked at number one on the French Singles Chart.

Due to this success, Casanova has a total of four different versions in German, Swedish, Turkish and Spanish. Milano was featured on the German version, ADAAM on the Swedish version and Sefo on the Turkish version. In December 7 2023, Soolking released the official remix for Casanova, featuring the Spanish artists Lola Indigo and Rvfv. This version was also a huge success, reaching number one at Spain charts and reaching over more than 110 million streams at Spotify.

== Charts ==
=== Weekly charts ===
Chart performance for "Casanova" (Soolking and Gazo)
Chart (2023)	Peak position
Belgium (Ultratop 50 Wallonia)	3
Czech Republic Singles Digital (ČNS IFPI)	92
France (SNEP)	1
Germany (GfK)	88
Italy (FIMI)	40
Luxembourg (Billboard)	3
Netherlands (Single Tip)	1
Spain (Promusicae)	93
Switzerland (Schweizer Hitparade)	7

Chart performance for "Casanova" (Soolking and Adaam)
Chart (2024)	Peak position
Sweden Heatseeker (Sverigetopplistan)	6

=== Year-end charts ===
2023 year-end chart performance for "Casanova"
Chart (2023)	Position
Switzerland (Schweizer Hitparade)	50

2025 year-end chart performance for "Casanova"
Chart (2025)	Position
France (SNEP)	153

== Certifications ==
Certifications for "Casanova"
Region	Certification	Certified units/sales
Belgium (BRMA)	2× Platinum	80,000^{‡}
France (SNEP)	Platinum	200,000^{‡}
Spain (Promusicae)	Gold	30,000^{‡}
^{‡} Sales+streaming figures based on certification alone.
