= Tayc =

French singer

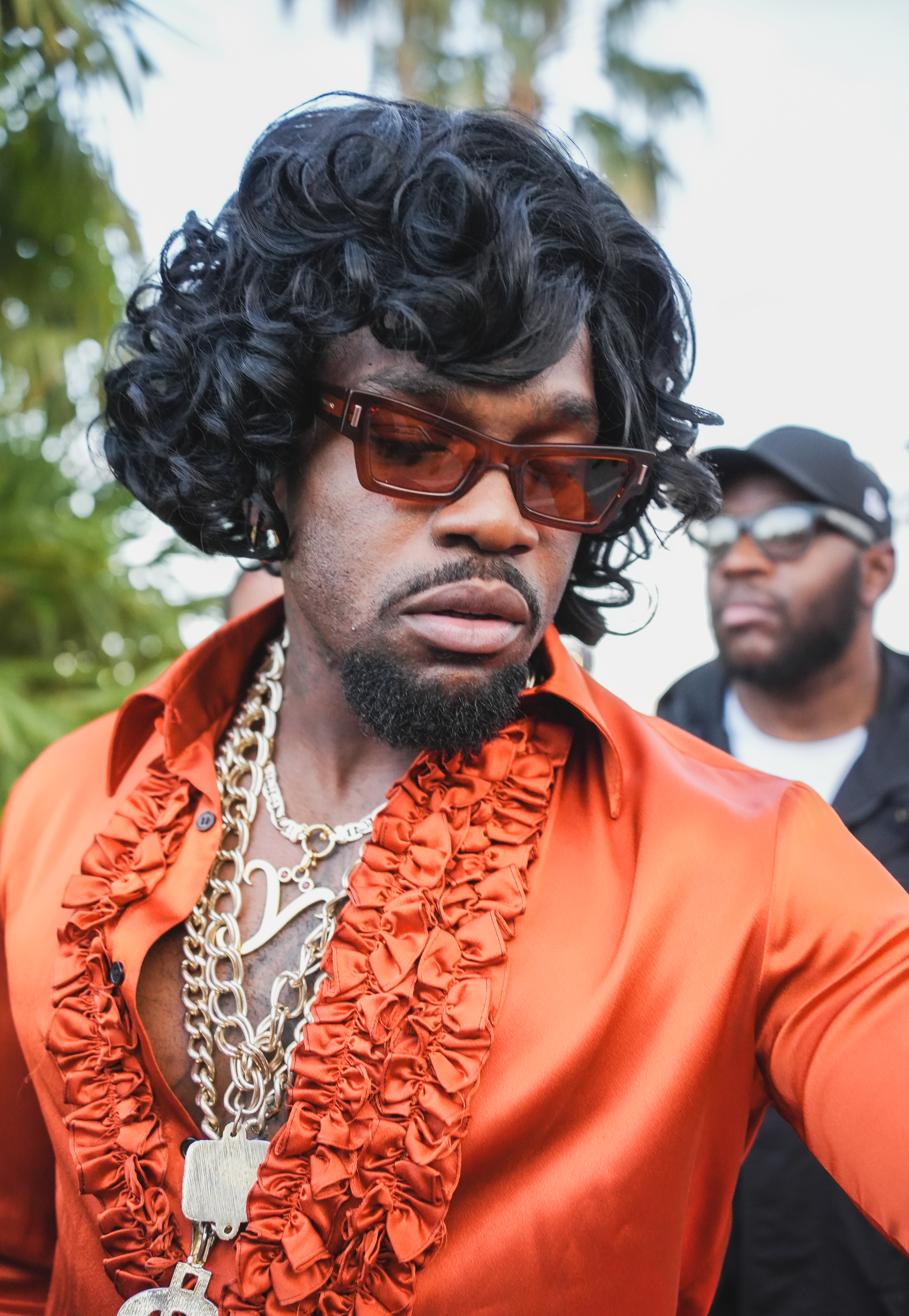
- Tayc in 2026

Background information
- Also known as: Taykee de Taykee
- Born: Julien Franck Bouadjie Monono Kamgang; 2 May 1996 (age 30); Marseille, Provence-Alpes-Côte d'Azur, France
- Genres: R&B; Afroswing; afropop; hip hop
- Occupations: Singer; songwriter
- Years active: 2012–present
- Label: H24 • Universal Music France • Good Mood Publishing • Play Two

Julien Franck Bouadjie Monono Kamgang (French pronunciation: [ʒyljɛ̃ fʁɑ̃k bwadʒi monono kamɡɑ̃ɡ]; born 2 May 1996), better known as Tayc (/taɪk/ TYKE, French: [tajk]), is a French singer.

== Career ==
He studied theatre and dance before moving to song and writing. His first release was a10-track mixtape, Alchemy on 30 May 2017 followed by a second mixtape H.E.L.I.O.S on 27 July 2018.

Signing with the label H24 founded by Barack Adama of Sexion D'assaut, he worked on his debut studio album. In February 2019, Tayc released debut album NYXIA which reissued two more times with, the Tome II on 21 June 2019 Tome III on 13 December 2019 all under the title Nyxia. Tome II particularly concentrated on his Cameroonian roots. He featured songs from his triple album with a big concert in Trianon de Paris on 19 October 2019.

Prior to the release of his triple album titled Nyxia (2019), he released two mixtapes and a number of singles. His second album called Fleur froide (2020) hit the charts which launched his international career. Tayc's latest release is called Fleur froide - Second état : la cristallisation (2021) accounts for various new singles as well as previous one from Fleur Froide.

== Personal life ==
Born in Marseille to Cameroonian parents, Bouadjie launched his musical career in 2012 after relocating to Paris.

When asked to mention his idols Tayc said that "I’m a really big Michael Jackson fan, I love Marvin Gaye, and I grew up listening to Ne-Yo, Joe, and all those artists. There are a few French ones too, Singuila is amazing, he’s a legend."

Tayc describes himself as "lover of the R&B genre first". He stated his style of music to be "Afrolov"; which blends the elements of R&B and Afrobeat.

== Discography ==
=== Albums and EPs ===
Title	Year	Peak positions			
Title	Year	FRA	BEL (Fl)	BEL (Wa)	SWI
Nyxia	2019	100	—	100	—
Nyxia, Tome II	2019	78	—	64	—
Nyxia, Tome III	2019	39	—	70	—
Fleur froide	2020	3	33	6	55
Fleur froide – Second état: la cristallisation	2022	—	—	71	—
Room 96	2023	18	—	14	16
Héritage (with Dadju)	2024	1	171	2	6
Testimony	2024	51	—	48	33
Joÿa	2026	2	—	17	19

=== Mixtapes ===
Title	Year
Alchemy	2017
H.E.L.I.O.S	2018

=== Singles ===
Title	Year	Peak positions			Album
Title	Year	FRA	BEL (Wa)	SWI	Album
"Moi, je prouve." (feat. Tayc)	2019	30	28* (Ultratrip)	—	Non-album release
"N'y pense plus"	2020	10	13* (Ultratrip)	—	Fleur froide
"Pour nous" (with Vegedream)	2020	47	—	—	Non-album release
"Comme toi"	2020	17	20* (Ultratrip)	—	Fleur froide
"Le temps"	2021	1	7	10	Fleur froide (Donum Novae)
"Dis moi comment."	2021	23	—	90	Fleur froide (DMC)
"Dodo"	2021	21	42	45	Fleur froide (DMC)
"Sans effet"	2022	—	48	—	Non-album singles
"Salomé" (with Marcus)	2022	28	—	—	Non-album singles
"Carry Me"	2023	43	—	—	Non-album singles
"Room 69"	2023	4	30	—	Non-album singles
"Makila: Wablé" (with Dadju)	2023	29	—	—	Non-album singles
"I Love You" (with Dadju)	2023	2	11	—	Non-album singles
"Yimmy Yimmy" (with Shreya Ghoshal and Jacqueline Fernandez)	2024	—	—	—	Non-album singles

=== Songs featured in ===
Title	Year	Peak positions	Album
Title	Year	FRA	Album
"Please" (Dadju feat. Tayc)	2019	38	(Dadju album); Poison ou antidote
"My Love" (Josman feat. Tayc)	2021	67	Non-album release
"Bye Bye" (Soolking feat. Tayc)	2021	50	Non-album release

=== Other charting songs ===
Title	Year	Peak positions	Album
Title	Year	FRA	Album
"Les larmes"	2019	152	
"Vous deux"	2020	67	Fleur froide
"Le miel"	2020	88	Fleur froide
"Et si" (feat. Camille Lellouche)	2020	93	Fleur froide
"Haine colorée" (feat. Christine and the Queens)	2020	104	Fleur froide
"Qui"	2020	115	Fleur froide
"J'ai mal"	2020	132	Fleur froide
"Cette vie"	2020	149	Fleur froide
"Better"	2020	152	Fleur froide
"Baby papa"	2020	155	Fleur froide
"Vrai og"	2020	164	Fleur froide
"Mieux"	2020	169	Fleur froide
"Toxic Boy"	2020	177	Fleur froide
"Parle moi"	2020	178	Fleur froide
"No."	2020	193	Fleur froide
"5 ans"	2020	198	Fleur froide

=== Collaborations ===
- 2018: "Dana" (feat Rawdolff)
- 2019: "Tu mens" (Dj Leska feat. Barack Adama, Tayc)
- 2019: "Poison ou antidote" (Dadju feat. Tayc)
- 2019: "Trip" (Lefa feat. Tayc)
- 2019: "Ewondo ou Bami" (feat Manu Dibango)
- 2020: "Libertad" (Chapitre 2) (Barack Adama feat. Tayc)
- 2020: "Mon Histoire - Part 1" (Abou Debeing feat. Tayc)
- 2020: "Meilleurs" (Abou Debeing feat. Tayc)
- 2020: "Cocktail" (DJ R'AN feat. Tayc)
- 2020: "Cocktail Remix" (DJ R'AN feat. Tayc)
- 2020: "Mes défauts (Barack Adama feat. Lefa)
- 2020: "Melody" (Gracy Hopkins feat. Tayc)
- 2020: "Pour nous" (Vegedream feat. Tayc)
- 2020: "Je Wanda" (Dinos feat. Tayc)

== Awards and nominations ==
Year	Organisation	Prize	Result
2020	NRJ Music Awards	Francophone Revelation of the year	Nominated
2023	The Future Awards Africa	Prize for Music	Nominated
