= Gazo (rapper) =

French rapper (born 1994)

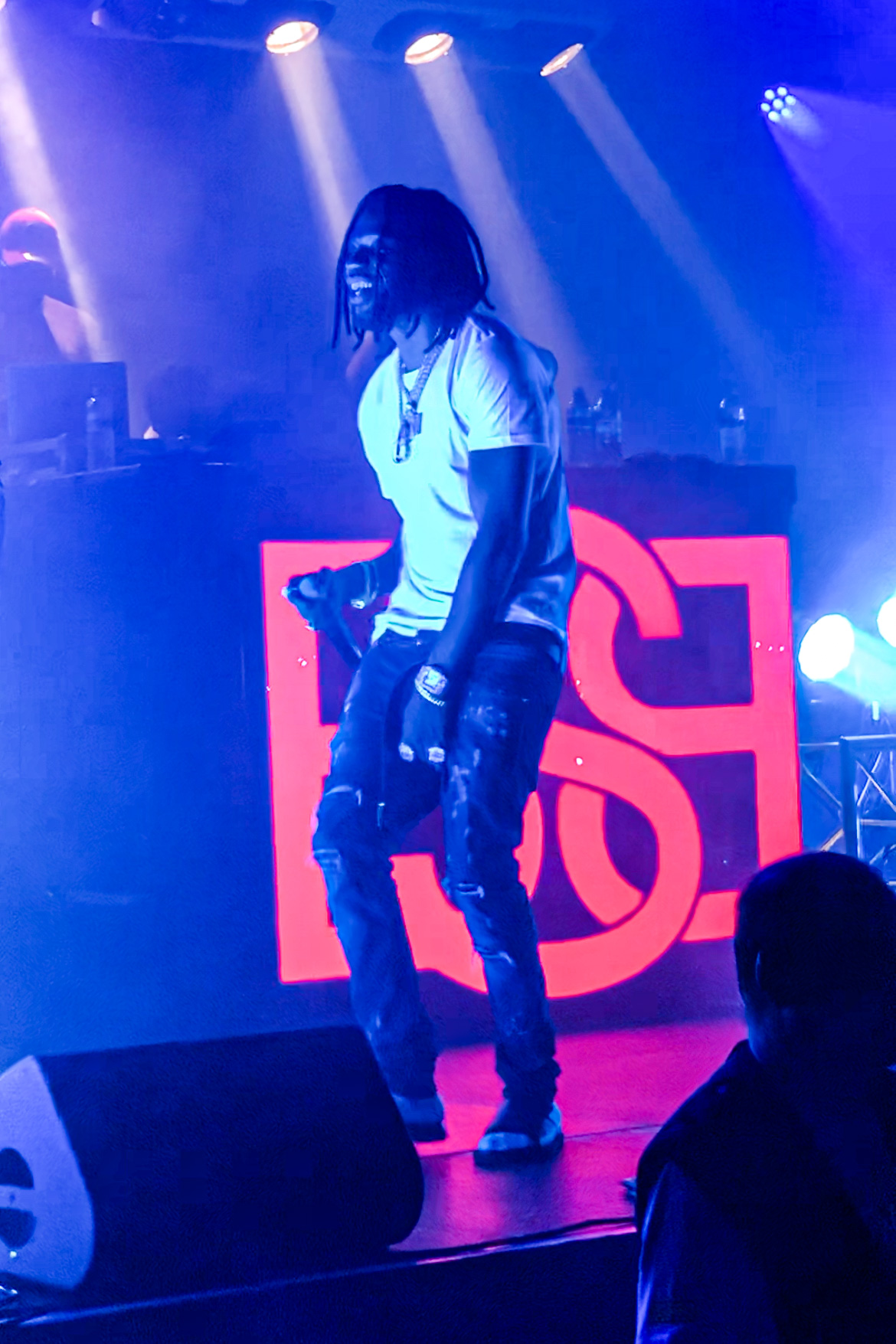

Background information
- Born: Ibrahima Diakité; 5 August 1994 (age 32); Châteauroux, Indre, Centre-Val de Loire, France
- Genres: French rap; UK drill; hip hop
- Occupations: Rapper
- Years active: 2015–present
- Labels: Epic Records France, BSB Productions
- Website: https://www.gazostore.fr/

Ibrahima Diakité (French pronunciation: [ibʁaima djakite]; born 5 August 1994), better known by his stage name Gazo (pronounced [ɡazo]), is a French rapper of Guinean descent.

Gazo is from a suburb of Paris called Saint-Denis. It is often named in many of his songs and also often identified as the "93" based on the French INSEE code for the region. In his youth, he got involved with a lot of troublemaking. His parents kicked him out by age 12, and by age 15 he left school, deciding to embark on his rap career along with some of his friends in Saint-Denis, eventually leading him to join the Gangster Disciple Nation (GDN) around the age of 16 with his friends. Putting a number of songs on YouTube, he got the attention of Gims who offered a joint track to him on his own album Le Fléau. Gazo released his own mixtape Drill FR on 26 February 2021. It reached number 1 on the French Albums Chart with the single "Haine&Sex" reaching number 2 on the French Single Chart.

Gazo has had much success in his rap career since. "Haine&Sex" has since received diamond certification. He is commonly known as "The Prince of French Drill". Per one of his producers, Flem KGB, as well as a general consensus among fans of French rap, Gazo created an identifiable brand for French drill music, taking influence from UK and US drill yet unique on its own.

== Early life ==
Ibrahima Diakhaté was born on 5 August 1994 in Châteauroux, to a Guinean family. He is the youngest of a family of five children. He grew up in small apartments in Belleville and then in the Roquette district. He is rapper MHD's cousin. From the age of 11, he was placed in an educational home. He stopped school in the sixth grade and went on to placements in a home and foster family until he came of age. He then went on to live between Saint-Denis and the street, without identity papers. In 2017, he was imprisoned for the first time in a remand center, only to return there a few weeks after his release.

== Career ==
=== Bramsou (until 2019) ===
Gazo began rapping under the name of Bramsou, sometimes Bram's, in reference to his first name, Ibrahima. From 5th grade, he wrote texts to "clash" one of his friends. Later, he founded a group with other young people from his home: the Barrodeur Music. Music was his only escape and allowed him to forget his difficult daily life. In 2017, he collaborated several times with the 4Keus Gang, the second entity of the 4Keus group and the former group of Tiakola, with whom he would go on to make a platinum single in 2021 and two in 2022. According to his statements, Bramsou is a name that has closed doors to him. “I had nothing more to lose. There was Bramsito, Brvmsoo La Deb and me who was called Bramsou, I passed for a fake because they had more light.” This caused him to change his musical style and so he took the name Gazo, a gazo being the nickname of trusted people in his neighborhood, those on whom you can count in case of trouble. He says: "I started with rap then I discovered drill, something dirty that reflects what happens in underprivileged neighborhoods but at the same time very melodious and even dancing, since it has its roots in Jamaica”.

=== Revelation to the general public and Drill FR (2019–2021) ===
In October 2019, he began a series of five freestyles "Drill FR" that would make him known nationally, allowing him in August 2020 to be the first artist to sign on the label Epic Records France of Sony Music, whose American leaning includes Drake and Travis Scott, among others. He would later confess that he would have quit music if the first sound of this series had not taken off: "I was out of breath. Luckily, this is done when the drill is a hit in France, including Dior of Pop Smoke”. With this he took on the look of mid-length braided locks accompanied by impressive jewelry including diamond teeth and gold glasses without frames, this was inspired by American stars Pop Smoke, Lil Wayne and XXXTentacion. On 18 June 2020, featuring Freeze Corleone, Gazo offers Drill FR 4, still considered in 2022 as the French drill sound. On 27 August 2020, the track Inceste was released, which marked Gazo's debut with Sony. Building on his new success, Gazo unveiled the track Tchin 2X12, which appeared on Kaaris' album, One song, which is now of Gazo's best-known, reached number 44 on the Top Singles chart on the day of the mixtape's release, and number 78 the next day20. It is called HAINE&SEX. A few weeks later, videos using this sound emerged on the social network TikTok, before it finally became a viral trend, which made him known to a wider and wider audience, so much so that he was certified a diamond record in September 2021. The success led him to many collaborations. On his first mixtape with foreign artists, like the British Russ Millions. Gazo has begun putting subtitles in his clips in English to export himself beyond the borders of the French-speaking world.

== Discography ==
=== Studio albums ===
Year	Title	Peak chart positions			
Year	Title	FRA	BEL (Fl)	BEL (Wa)	SWI
2022	KMT	1	54	1	2
2023	La Melo est Gangx (with Tiakola)	1	69	1	3
2024	Apocalypse	1	71	1	2

=== Mixtapes ===
Year	Title	Peak chart positions			
Year	Title	FRA	BEL (Fl)	BEL (Wa)	SWI
2021	Drill FR	1	93	3	20

=== Singles ===
Year	Title	Peak chart positions				Album / Mixtape
Year	Title	FRA	BEL (Wa)	SWI	WW	Album / Mixtape
2020	"Drill FR 4" (feat. Freeze Corleone)	135	—	—	—	
2020	"Drill FR 5" (feat. Hamza)	43	11 (Ultratip*)	—	—	Drill FR
2020	"Tchin 2x"	45	—	—	—	Drill FR
2021	"Kassav" (feat. Tiakola)	19	17 (Ultratip*)	—	—	Drill FR
2021	"Haine&Sex"	2	13	27	—	Drill FR
2021	"Tu le sais" (with Kalash)	21	—	—	—	Non-album releases
2021	"Grokuwa"	22	—	—	—	Non-album releases
2021	"Mauvais 2x" (featuring Ninho)	10	32	—	—	KMT
2022	"My Men" (with Rapi Sati)	—	—	—	—	Non-album single
2022	"Celine 3x"	1	26	—	—	KMT
2022	"Molly – A Colors Show"	4	28	—	—	KMT
2022	"Bodies" (feat. Damso)	2	12	—	—	KMT
2023	"No lèche" (with Leto, Kerchak and Favé)	4	19	47	—	Non-album singles
2023	"La rue" (with No Limit and Damso)	1	2	—	—	Non-album singles
2023	"Casanova" (with Soolking)	1	3	7	—	Non-album singles
2023	"Saiyan" (with Heuss l'Enfoiré)	2	8	53	—	Non-album singles
2023	"100K"	2	13	51	—	La Melo est Gangx
2024	"Mami wata" (with Tiakola)	5	28	—	—	Non-album single
2024	"Probation"	6	13	54	—	Apocalypse
2024	"Nanani Nanana"	1	1	3	191	Apocalypse
2025	"Kat" (featuring La Rvfleuze)	27	35	—	—	Non-album single

*Did not appear in the official Belgian Ultratop 50 charts, but rather in the bubbling under Ultratip charts.

=== Featured in ===
Year	Title	Peak chart positions		Album
Year	Title	FRA	BEL (Wa)	Album
2020	"Oro Jackson" (Gims feat. Gazo)	79	—	Gims album Le Fléau
2020	"Dors on te piétine" (Jul feat. Gazo)	22	—	Jul album Loin du monde
2021	"Gas" (Mister V feat. Gazo)	41	14 (Ultratip*)	
2021	"Spaghetti" (Hamza feat. Gazo & Guy2Bezbar)	35	—	Hamza album 140 BPM 2
2021	"Kalitada" (Unité feat. Heuss l'Enfoiré, Gazo & SLK)	94	—	Non-album release
2022	"Filtré" (Timal feat.Gazo)	1	45	Timal album Arès
2022	"Reggae & Calypso - Remix" (Russ Millions, Buni, YV, Gazo, SwitchOTR, CH, Rose Real)	—	—	Non-album release
2022	"22 Carats" (Headie One featuring Gazo)	—	—	
2023	"C'est carré le S" (Naps featuring Gazo and Ninho)	1	21	En temps réel
2023	"Flashback" (Favé featuring Gazo)	7	9	Non-album releases
2024	"Ça mène à rien" (PLK featuring Gazo)	—	18	Non-album releases
2024	"Ce soir" (Adèle Castillon featuring Gazo)	—	—	Non-album releases
2024	"Vrais Salauds" (Lacrim featuring. Gazo, Kore	34	—	Non-album releases
2024	"La famine" (Werenoi featuring Gazo)	—	35	Non-album releases

*Did not appear in the official Belgian Ultratop 50 charts, but rather in the bubbling under Ultratip charts.

=== Other charted songs ===
Year	Title	Peak chart positions			Album / Mixtape
Year	Title	FRA	BEL (Wa)	SWI	Album / Mixtape
2021	"A$AP"	32	—	—	Drill FR
2021	"Go" (feat. Franglish & Landy)	37	—	—	Drill FR
2021	"Euphon"	59	—	—	Drill FR
2021	"Parkinson"	68	—	—	Drill FR
2021	"Intro"	80	—	—	Drill FR
2021	"Cache cou" (feat. Hache-P)	83	—	—	Drill FR
2021	"Inhumain"	102	—	—	Drill FR
2021	"BSB"	124	—	—	Drill FR
2021	"On a" (feat. Luciano)	127	—	—	Drill FR
2021	"Malagangx"	161	—	—	Drill FR
2021	"Mon cher" (feat. Unknown T & Pa Salieu)	179	—	—	Drill FR
2021	"Message groupé" (with Kore)	161	—	—	En Passant Pécho (Soundtrack)
2021	"X3" (with Ashe 22)	113	—	—	Ashe 22 Mixtape; Ashe Tape Vol. 3
2021	"Daddy chocolat" (with Koba LaD)	2	29	72	Koba LaD album Cartel vol. 1
2022	"Rappel"	4	22	—	KMT
2022	"Fleurs" (feat. Tiakola)	10	—	—	KMT
2022	"Lettre a un Opps"	13	—	—	KMT
2022	"Die"	1	2	7	KMT
2022	"Becte"	17	—	—	KMT
2022	"Jeux Dangereux"	26	—	—	KMT
2022	"M.A.L.A" (feat. M Huncho)	27	—	—	KMT
2022	"Hennessy"	28	—	—	KMT
2022	"Gra Gra Boom" (feat. Skread)	29	—	—	KMT
2022	"Boss"	31	—	—	KMT
2022	"Impact"	32	—	—	KMT
2023	"Notre Dame" (with Tiakola)	1	18	43	La Melo est Gangx
2023	"Cartier" (with Tiakola)	4	34	76	La Melo est Gangx
2023	"24/34" (with Tiakola)	7	33	—	La Melo est Gangx
2023	"SoBad" (with Tiakola)	10	—	—	La Melo est Gangx
2023	"Mami Wata" (with Tiakola)	12	—	—	La Melo est Gangx
2023	"AfricanBadman" (with Tiakola)	14	—	—	La Melo est Gangx
2023	"A.V.S.D" (with Tiakola)	16	—	—	La Melo est Gangx
2023	"Ambitions" (with Tiakola)	17	—	—	La Melo est Gangx
2023	"Interlude" (with Tiakola)	18	—	—	La Melo est Gangx
2023	"Outro" (with Tiakola)	19	—	—	La Melo est Gangx
2024	"Pure Codei" (featuring Yame)	12	40	96	Apocalypse
2024	"Wemby" (featuring Offset)	18	46	—	Apocalypse
2024	"Toki"	19	—	—	Apocalypse
2024	"Optimale"	20	—	—	Apocalypse
2024	"Birthday"	21	—	—	Apocalypse
2024	"La Belle Et la Bete"	24	—	—	Apocalypse
2024	"Fiesta"	25	—	—	Apocalypse
2024	"Encore Plus Fort Elle Aime Ça"	26	—	—	Apocalypse
2024	"Wayans"	30	—	—	Apocalypse
2024	"Selele"	33	—	—	Apocalypse
2024	"ILuv"	47	—	—	Apocalypse
2024	"Sevice"	50	—	—	Apocalypse
