= Suavemente (Soolking song) =

Single by Soolking

from the album Sans visa
- Language: French
- Released: 23 February 2022
- Recorded: 2022
- Genre: Hip-hop; urban pop; R&B
- Length: 2:39
- Label: Affranchis Music; Hyper Focal
- Songwriters: Abderraouf Deradji; Elvis Crespo; Nassim Voluptyk
- Producers: Voluptyk; Scar Productions

Music video
- "Suavemente" on YouTube

"Suavemente" is a song by Algerian singer Soolking released by Hyper Focal and Affranchis Music on 23 February 2022. The song peaked at number one on the French Singles Chart. The refrain comes from Elvis Crespo's song, "Suavemente".

A remix featuring Italian singer Boro Boro was released on April 22, 2022.

== Music video ==
The music video was filmed in the streets of the Saint-Jacques district in Perpignan, the hometown of influencer Nasdas, who can also be seen with his team. It was released on the same day as the single. It reached one million views in 10 days.

== Charts ==
=== Weekly charts ===
Weekly chart performance for "Suavemente"
Chart (2022)	Peak position
Belgium (Ultratop 50 Flanders)	22
Belgium (Ultratop 50 Wallonia)	5
Canada AC (Billboard)	39
France (SNEP)	1
Italy (FIMI)	17
Luxembourg (Billboard)	11
Netherlands (Single Tip)	25
Switzerland (Schweizer Hitparade)	6

=== Year-end charts ===
Year-end chart performance for "Suavemente"
Chart (2022)	Position
Belgium (Ultratop Flanders)	114
Belgium (Ultratop Wallonia)	12
France (SNEP)	4
Italy (FIMI)	63

== Certifications ==
Certifications for "Suavemente"
Region	Certification	Certified units/sales
Belgium (BRMA)	Platinum	40,000^{‡}
Canada (Music Canada)	Gold	40,000^{‡}
France (SNEP)	Diamond	333,333^{‡}
Italy (FIMI)	2× Platinum	200,000^{‡}
Switzerland (IFPI Switzerland)	Platinum	20,000^{‡}
^{‡} Sales+streaming figures based on certification alone.
