= Dadju =

French singer (born 1991)

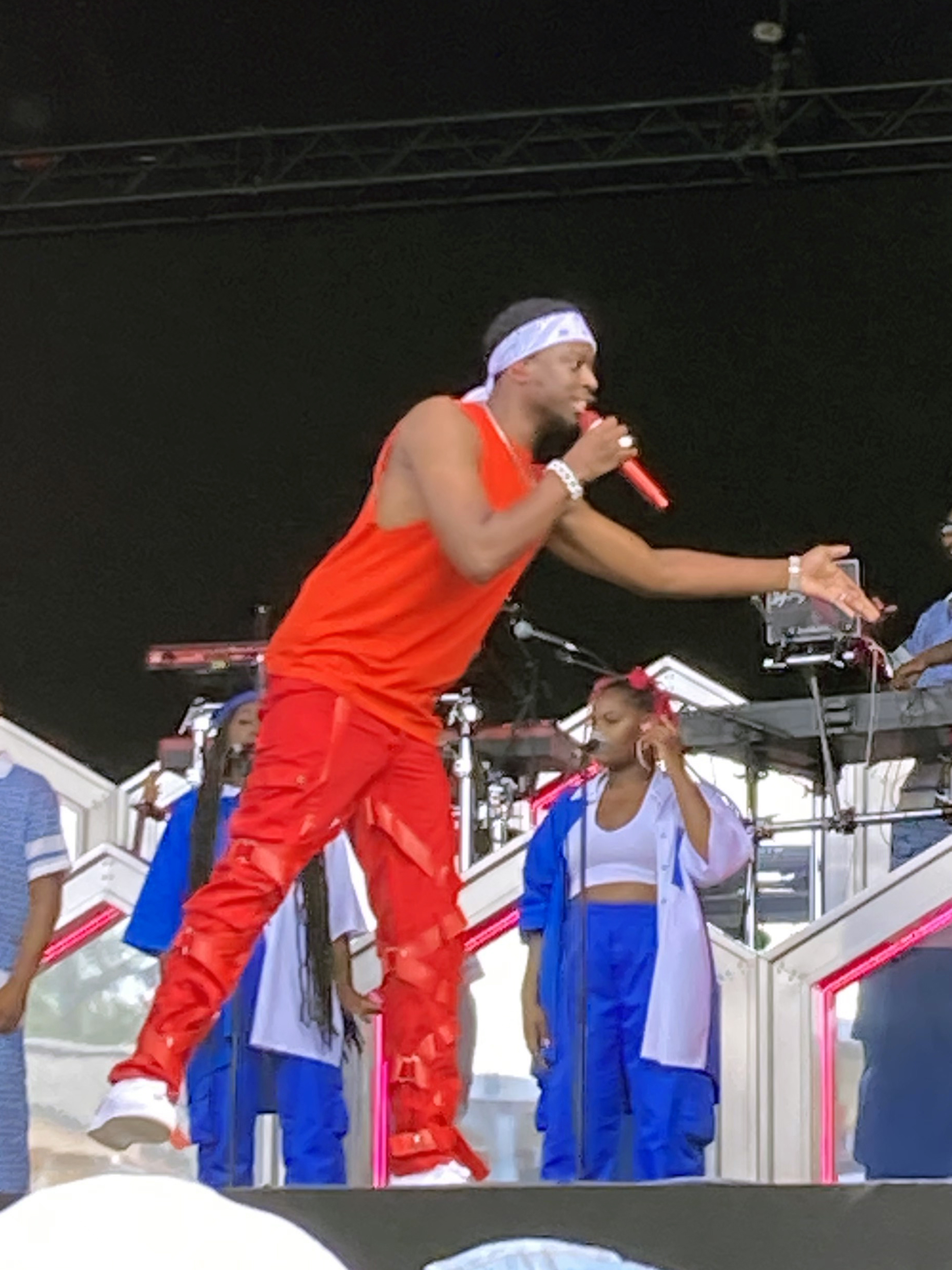
- Dadju in 2022

Background information
- Also known as: Prince Dadj
- Born: Dadju Djuna Nsungula Alimasi; 2 May 1991 (age 35); Melun, Île-de-France, France
- Genres: R&B; hip hop; afropop; soul
- Occupation: Singer
- Labels: Wati B (2012-2016); Polydor; Universal Music Group (since 2017)
- Formerly of: Shin Sekaï
- Website: www.dadjuofficiel.com

Dadju Alimasi Nsungula (French pronunciation: [dadʒu dʒuna ɛnsunɡula]; born 2 May 1991), better known by the mononym Dadju or at times Prince Dadj, is a French-Congolese singer. He was signed to the label Wati B and in 2017 signed with Polydor Records of Universal Music Group. He was a member of the musical formation Shin Sekaï alongside rapper Abou Tall from 2012 to 2016. The duo was part of the label Wati B and released the album Indéfini. The duo announced that they were breaking up so they can each follow solo careers. Dadju released his solo album Gentleman 2.0 in 2017.

== Personal life ==
Dadju comes from a musical family. His father is Djanana Djuna, a Congolese vocalist of Papa Wemba's band. His half-brother is Gims, a famous solo singer and ex-member of the successful French rap group Sexion d'Assaut, a major act under the music label Wati B. His other brothers Bedjik and Xgangs are also rappers in their own right.

In 2016, he got married and had a daughter a few months later. He welcomed a baby boy in 2020.

On 22 April 2025, performed at the sold-out benefit concert called Solidarité Congo at the Accor Arena. This charitable event featured 30 prominent artists from the French rap industry, along with internationally recognized and Congolese musicians to raise funds for children affected by the Rwandan-backed M23 insurgency in eastern DRC, with proceeds directed to his Give Back Charity.

== Discography ==
=== Albums ===
as part of Shin Sekaï

- 2013: The Shin Sekaï Vol. I (mixtape)
- 2014: Volume II (mixtape)
- 2016: Indéfini

Solo

Year	Album	Peak positions				Units	Certifications
Year	Album	FRA	BEL (Fl)	BEL (Wa)	SWI	Units	Certifications
2017	Gentleman 2.0	1	74	7	35	FRA: 500,000	SNEP: Diamond
2019	Poison	1	47	6	6	FRA: 128,120	SNEP: 3× Platinum
2019	Antidote	1	—	74	—	FRA: 128,120	
2022	Cullinan	1	65	7	23		
2024	Héritage (with Tayc)	1	171	2	6		

=== EPs ===
Year	Title	Peak positions
Year	Title	BEL (Wa)
2023	Cullinan: Gelée royale (Partie 2)	143

=== Singles ===
Year	Single	Peak positions			Certifications	Album
Year	Single	FRA	BEL (Wa)	SWI	Certifications	Album
2017	"Reine"	2	36	84	SNEP: Diamond	Gentleman 2.0
2017	"Déjà trouvé"	42	—	—	SNEP: Gold	Gentleman 2.0
2017	"J'ai dit non"	54	—	—	SNEP: Gold	Gentleman 2.0
2017	"Bob Marley"	3	6	—	SNEP: Diamond; BEA: Gold	Non-album single
2018	"Django" (feat. Franglish)	16	35	—	SNEP: Platinum	Gentleman 2.0
2018	"Christina"	31	37* (Ultratip)	—	SNEP: Gold	Gentleman 2.0
2018	"Jaloux"	1	17	37	SNEP: Diamond	Non-album singles
2018	"Mafuzzy Style"	80	—	—		Non-album singles
2019	"Compliqué"	6	41	86	SNEP: Diamond	Poison
2019	"Ma vie"	3	33	—	SNEP: Platinum	Poison
2020	"Grand bain" (feat. Ninho)	1	14	53	SNEP: Diamond; BEA: Gold	Non-album single
2020	"Dieu merci" (feat. Tiakola)	8	1* (Ultratip)	94	SNEP: Gold	Non-album single
2021	"Belle" (with Gims and Slimane)	45	—	—		Les vestiges du fléau (Gims album)
2021	"Mon soleil" (with Anitta)	8	22	—	SNEP: Diamond	Poison ou Antidote
2021	"Dans mes bras" (with Kendji Girac)	50	12	—		Mi Vida
2023	"Makila: Wablé" (with Tayc)	29	—	—		Non-album singles
2023	"I Love You" (with Tayc)	2	11	—		Non-album singles

*Did not appear in the official Belgian Ultratop 50 charts, but rather in the bubbling under Ultratip charts

=== Featured in ===
Year	Single	Peak positions			Certifications	Album
Year	Single	FRA	BEL (Wa)	SWI	Certifications	Album
2015	"Sans rétro" (Maître Gims feat. Dadju (of The Shin Sekaï))	184				Maître Gims album Mon cœur avait raison
2017	"Enfants d'Afrique" (KeBlack feat. Dadju)	162				KeBlack album Premier étage
2017	"La paix n'a pas de prix" (Alonzo feat. Dadju)	53				Alonzo album 100%
2017	"Fuego" (Aya Nakamura feat. Dadju)	119				Aya Nakamura album Journal Intime
2017	"Moi je vérifie" (Naza feat. Dadju & Aya Nakamura)	185				Naza album Incroyable
2017	"C'est pas bon" (Abou Debeing feat. Dadju)	58	29* (Ultratip)		SNEP: Platinum	
2018	"Tant pis" (Dry feat. Dadju)	89			SNEP: Gold	
2018	"Tout se passe après minuit" (Black M feat. Dadju)		20* (Ultratip)			Black M album Éternel insatisfait [Réédition]
2018	"Tu ne le vois pas" (Maître Gims feat. Dadju)	13	49		SNEP: Gold	Maître Gims album Ceinture noire
2018	"Bella ciao" (Naestro feat. Maître Gims, Dadju, Vitaa and Slimane)	2	13	41	SNEP: Diamond	
2018	"Bébé" (MHD feat. Dadju)	6	14* (Ultratip)	83	SNEP: Platinum	MHD album 19
2019	"Muerte" (Landy feat. Dadju)	13			SNEP: Platinum	Landy album Assa Baing
2019	"Adieu" (Lynda feat. Dadju)	36			SNEP: Gold	
2019	"Jamais" (Ninho feat. Dadju)	6			SNEP: Platinum	Ninho album Destin
2019	"M.D.V" (Alonzo feat. Dadju)	120				Alonzo album Stone
2019	"Calimero" (Vegedream feat. Dadju)	136				Vegedream album Ategban
2019	"10/10" (Maître Gims feat. Dadju & Alonzo)	94	6* (Ultratip)		SNEP: Gold	Maître Gims album Ceinture noire (Transcendance - Ré-édition)
2020	"Comme ça" (Franglish feat. Dadju)		23* (Ultratip)			Franglish album Monsieur
2020	"Meleğim" (Soolking feat. Dadju)	2	26	52	SNEP: Diamond; BEA: Gold	Soolking album Vintage
2020	"Piquée" (Kaaris feat. Dadju)	26				Kaaris album 2.7.0
2020	"Sécurisé" (Rohff feat. Dadju)	40				Non-album release
2022	"Dançarina (Remix)" (Pedro Sampaio feat. Anitta, Nicky Jam, Dadju, Mc Pedrinho)	33				Anitta album Versions of Me

*Did not appear in the official Belgian Ultratop 50 charts, but rather in the bubbling under Ultratip charts

=== Other charted songs ===
Year	Single	Peak positions		Certifications	Album
Year	Single	FRA	BEL (Wa)	Certifications	Album
2017	"Ma fierté" (feat. Maître Gims & Alonzo)	28	14* (Ultratip)	SNEP: Gold	Gentleman 2.0
2017	"Intuition"	29		SNEP: Gold	Gentleman 2.0
2017	"Comme si de rien n'était"	12		SNEP: Platinum	Gentleman 2.0
2017	"Seconde chance"	34	7* (Ultratip)	SNEP: Gold	Gentleman 2.0
2017	"Gentleman 2.0"	80			Gentleman 2.0
2017	"Lionne"	18	13* (Ultratip)	SNEP: Platinum	Gentleman 2.0
2017	"Oublie le"	11		SNEP: Gold	Gentleman 2.0
2017	"Monica"	70			Gentleman 2.0
2017	"#PTD"	61			Gentleman 2.0
2017	"Sous contrôle" (feat. Niska)	19	19* (Ultratip)	SNEP: Gold	Gentleman 2.0
2017	"Par amour" (feat. Maître Gims)	10	6* (Ultratip)	SNEP: Diamond	Gentleman 2.0
2017	"Trouvez la moi" (feat. KeBlack & Fally Ipupa)	38		SNEP: Gold	Gentleman 2.0
2017	"#Déjà donné"	55			Gentleman 2.0
2017	"Jenny" (feat. S.Pri Noir)	52		SNEP: Gold	Gentleman 2.0
2018	"Mon cœur à ta taille" (feat. Kalash)	71			
2018	"Apollonia" (Dadju & Sofiane)	48			93 Empire
2018	"Sans thème"	25			
2018	"Comme à chaque fois"	180			
2018	"Escort"	171			
2018	"Tu n'es pas moi"	124			
2019	"Confessions"	20			Poison
2019	"Paire d'As" (feat. Nekfeu)	10			Poison
2019	"TPB" (feat. Koba LaD)	11			Poison
2019	"Je ne t'aime plus"	12			Poison
2019	"Bobo au cœur"	19	43	SNEP: Gold	Poison
2019	"Ma faute"	27			Poison
2019	"Perdu"	30			Poison
2019	"Toi d'abord"	31			Poison
2019	"Mémoire courte"	34			Poison
2019	"Robe" (feat. Damso)	38			Poison
2019	"Papa"	45			Poison
2019	"Jure-le"	50			Poison
2019	"Please" (feat. Tayc)	53			Poison
2019	"Wouli liya" (feat. Kaly, Soolking & Aymane Serhani)	67			Poison
2019	"Ma Woman"	118			Poison
2019	"Donne-moi l'accord" (feat. Burna Boy)	131			Poison
2019	"Normal"	153			Poison
2019	"Back It Up"	159			Poison
2019	"Cette femme"	164			Poison
2019	"Promesse"	181			Poison
2019	"Maamou"	185			Poison
2020	"Amour toxic"	14	34	SNEP: Gold	Non-album release
2020	"Va dire à ton ex"	18			Non-album release
2020	"Elle me demande"	20			Non-album release
2020	"Le mâle honnête"	55			Non-album release
2020	"Provoquer"	56			Non-album release
2020	"La roue tourne"	111			Non-album release
2020	"Piqûre de rappel"	135			Non-album release
2020	"Tout ou rien du tout" (feat. Ocevne)	87			Non-album release
2022	"Toko Toko"	17		SNEP: Gold	Poison
2024	"Le Contrat" (with Tayc)	56	—	—	
2024	"Tout Essayer?" (with Tayc)	65	—	—	
2024	"Apprends Moi" (with Tayc)	71	—	—	
2024	"Sold Out" (with Tayc)	73	—	—	
2024	"Makila : Wable" (with Tayc)	78	—	—	
2024	"Épouse-Moi" (with Tayc)	80	—	—	
2024	"Une Semaine Pour Oublier..." (with Tayc)	86	—	—	
2024	"Terminal 2F" (with Gims)	26	—	—	
