= Soolking =

Algerian singer and rapper (born 1989)

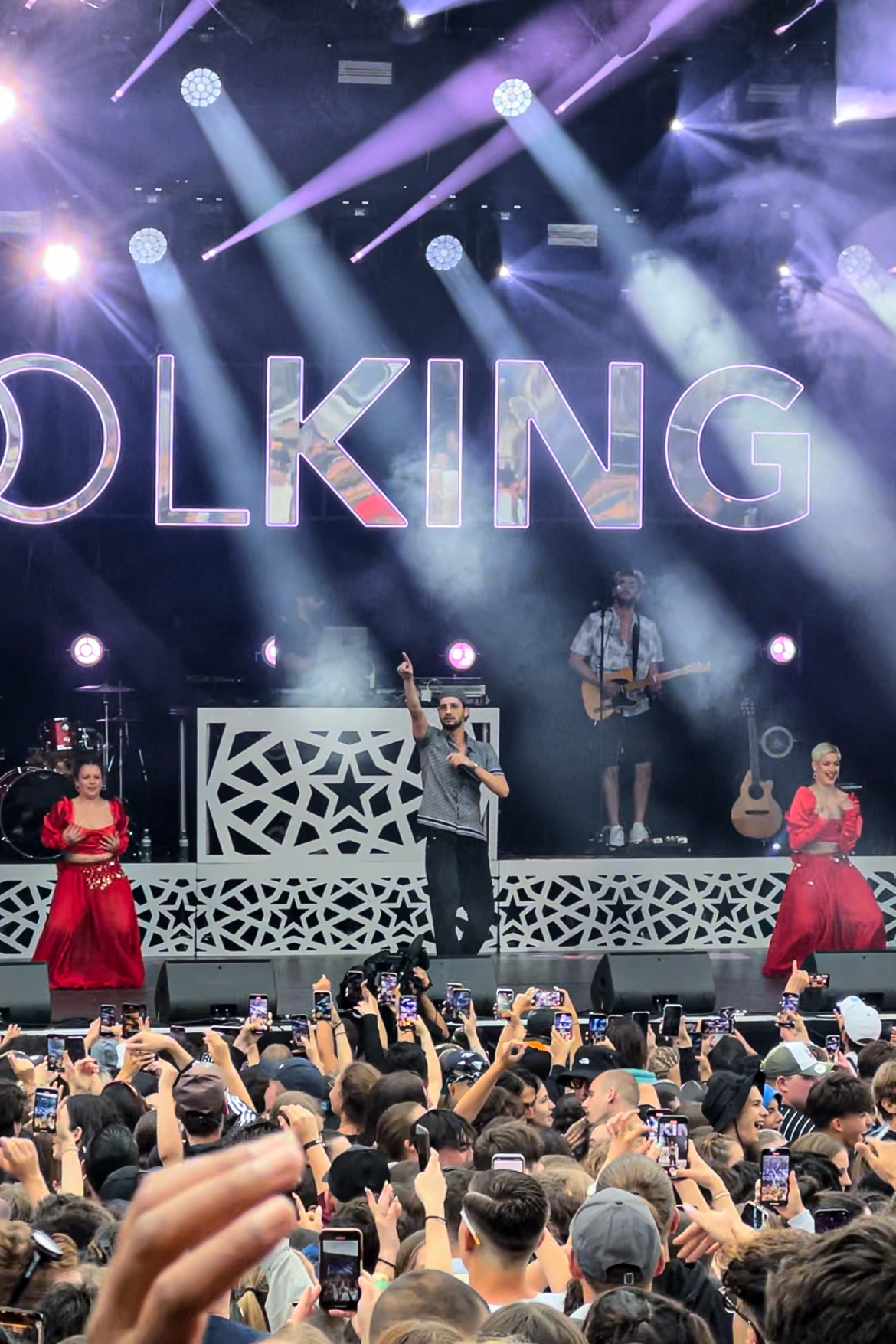
- Soolking in 2023

Background information
- Also known as: Soolking
- Born: Abderraouf Deradji; 10 December 1989 (age 36); El Hammamet, Algiers, Algeria
- Genres: Hip hop music, raï music, soul music
- Occupations: Singer; rapper
- Years active: 2008–present
- Labels: Capitol, Universal

Abderraouf Deradji (Arabic: عبد الرؤوف دراجي; born 10 December 1989), known professionally as Soolking, is an Algerian singer and rapper. He started his career under the pseudonym MC Sool until 2013 before adopting his new stage name. He incorporates reggae, soul, hip-hop and Algerian raï in his music.

== Life and career ==
Derradji was born in Algeria in a northern suburb of the capital Algiers, also known as Staouali .His father was a percussionist and he started very young in a rock band that incorporated music and dance. He arrived in France in 2008 but returned to Algeria to join the Algerian rap group Africa Jungle. The band released two albums.

He started his solo career in 2016 and is signed to the label Affranchis Music launched by Sofiane. He had initial success with 'Milano' and 'Guérilla' before achieving phenomenal success with 'Dalida', an homage to the singer Dalida, sampling her hit "Paroles, paroles". On November 2, 2018, Soolking released his debut solo album, Fruit du Démon, which was certified Gold in France. The singles "Guérilla" and "Dalida" were certified Platinum. He released his second studio album, Vintage, in 2020. On 26 May 2022, he released Sans visa, his third album. In February 2025, he released his fourth album, Africa Jungle Part 1.

== 2019 accident ==
On August 23, 2019, Soolking held a large concert at Stade 20 Août 1955, accompanied by L'Algérino, Fianso, Alonzo, and Dhurata Dora. During the entrance to the stadium, five people died due to a stampede. Soolking said after the concert that if he had known what happened he would have cancelled the concert. One of the reasons for the accident was that more tickets were sold than the stadium's capacity could accommodate.

== Discography ==
=== Albums ===
Year	Title	Chart positions					Certifications
Year	Title	FRA	BEL (Fl)	BEL (Wa)	NLD	SWI	Certifications
2018	Fruit du démon	5	70	7	57	32	SNEP: Platinum
2020	Vintage	3	31	5	38	12	SNEP: Platinum
2022	Sans visa	2	136	9	—	25	SNEP: Platinum; BEA: 3× Platinum
2025	Africa Jungle Part 1	14	—	52	—	—	

=== Singles ===
==== As lead artist ====
Year	Title	Chart positions							Certifications	Album
Year	Title	FRA	AUT	BEL (Wa)	BEL (Fl)	GER	ITA	SWI	Certifications	Album
2018	"Milano"	157	–	–	–	–	–	–	SNEP: Gold	Fruits du démon
2018	"Guérilla"	33	–	13* (Ultratip)	–	–	–	–	SNEP: Diamond	Fruits du démon
2018	"Dalida"	11	–	3* (Ultratip)	–	–	–	–	SNEP: Platinum	Fruits du démon
2019	"Bébé allô"	158	–	–	–	–	–	–		Non-album single
2020	"Meleğim" (featuring Dadju)	2	–	26	40* (Ultratip)	–	–	52	SNEP: Diamond; BEA: Gold	Vintage
2020	"Hayati" (featuring Mero)	165	31	–	–	10	–	23		Vintage
2020	"Rockstar II"	150	–	–	–	–	–	–		Vintage Gearforth
2020	"Jennifer" (remix) (feat. Lynda, Heuss, L'Algérino, Franglish)	–	–	–	–	–	–	–		Vintage Gearforth
2021	"Fada"	127	–	–	–	–	–	–		Sans visa
2021	"Mal à la tête" 4.4.2 - Soolking X Heuss l'Enfoiré	65	–	–	–	–	–	–		Non-album single
2021	"Bye Bye"; Soolking X Tayc	50	–	–	–	–	–	–		Sans visa
2022	"Suavemente" (solo or featuring Boro Boro)	1	–	5	22	–	17	6		Sans visa
2022	"Balader" (featuring Niska)	2	–	22	–	–	–	72		Sans visa
2023	"Après vous madame" (with Gims)	74	–	46	–	–	–	–		Non-album singles
2023	"Casanova" (with Gazo)	1	–	3	–	–	40	7		Non-album singles
2024	"Carré OK" (featuring Gims)	19	–	9	–	–	–	–		Non-album singles
2025	"Tour du monde" (with L2B)	11	–	45	–	–	–	–		Non-album singles

==== As featured artist ====
Year	Title	Chart positions			Certifications	Album
Year	Title	FRA	BEL (Wa)	SWI	Certifications	Album
2017	"Ajajaj" (Mert feat. Soolking)	56				
2018	"Madame courage" (Sofiane feat. Soolking)	35				
2018	"Vai nova" (YL feat. Soolking)	38				
2018	"Favela" (Naps feat. Soolking)	38	Tip		SNEP: Gold	
2018	"Adios" (L'Algérino feat. Soolking)	100			SNEP: Gold	
2018	"Woah" (Sofiane feat. Vald, Mac Tyer, Soolking, Kalash Criminel, Sadek & Heuss l'Enfoiré)	7	12* (Ultratip)		SNEP: Gold	93 Empire album 93 Empire
2018	"Savage" (Kalash Criminel feat. Soolking)	85				
2018	"Come vai" (Jul feat. Soolking)	33				
2019	"Zemër" (Dhurata Dora feat. Soolking)	21	6* (Ultratip)	13	SNEP: Platinum	
2019	"Benda" (Heuss l'Enfoiré feat. Soolking)	23			SNEP: Gold	Heuss l'Enfoiré album En Esprit
2019	"Maladie" (Lacrim feat. Soolking)	15			SNEP: Gold	Lacrim album Lacrim
2019	"Dans mon délire" (Black M feat. Heuss L'Enfoiré & Soolking)	138	15			Lacrim album Lacrim
2020	"T'es allée où?" (Leto feat. Soolking)	74				Leto album 100 visages
2020	"Pas la peine" (Sifax feat. Soolking)	150				Sifax album La mentale
2020	"Luna" (Lynda feat. Soolking)	70				Lynda album Papillon
2020	"Unité" (Dadju - Hatik - Soolking - Imen Es)	59				
2021	"Aquí" (with AriBeatz and Ozuna)	–	45* (Ultratip)			
2021	"Bebeto" (Kendji Girac with Soolking)	45	13			Kendji Girac album Mi vida
2021	"Nouveaux parrains" (Sofiane with Soolking)	42				Sofiane album La direction
2021	"Dinero" (Alonzo with Soolking)	118				Alonzo album Capo dei capi - Vol. II & III
2021	"Amiga" (Niro with Soolking)	137				
2021	"Tagada " (Naps feat. Le Rat Luciano & Soolking)	184				Naps album Les mains faites pour l'or

=== Other charting songs ===
Year	Title	Chart positions	Certifications	Album
Year	Title	FRA	Certifications	Album
2018	"Rockstar"	36	SNEP: Gold	Fruit du démon
2018	"Bambina"	50		Fruit du démon
2018	"Amsterdam"	42		Fruit du démon
2018	"Gucci"	90		Fruit du démon
2018	"Tata"	51		Fruit du démon
2018	"Vroom vroom"	30		Fruit du démon
2018	"HLM"	84		Fruit du démon
2018	"Chica"	86		Fruit du démon
2018	"Youv"	64		Fruit du démon
2018	"Paradise"	122		Fruit du démon
2018	"Cosa nostra" (feat. Sofiane, Lacrim)	39		Fruit du démon
2018	"Mirage" (feat. Khaled)	74		Fruit du démon
2018	"Fruit de la zone" (feat. Jul)	90		Fruit du démon
2019	"Liberté"	195		
2019	"Espérance"	119		
2020	"Ça fait des années" (feat. Cheb Mami)	34		Vintage
2020	"La Kichta" (feat. Heuss l'Enfoiré)	47	SNEP: Gold	Vintage
2020	"Chihuahua" (feat. Gambi)	65		Vintage
2020	"CNLZ" (feat. Jul & Kliff)	68		Vintage
2020	"Maryline" (feat. SCH)	70		Vintage
2020	"Marbella"	123		Vintage
2020	"Vida loca 2"	142		Vintage
2020	"Corbeau"	162		Vintage
2020	"On ira" (feat. 13 Block)	174		Vintage
2020	"Wahda"	183		Vintage
2020	"Solo"	195		Vintage
2020	"Dangereuse"	196		Vintage
2022	"Askim"	70		

=== Various releases ===
- 2016: "Vida Loca"
- 2016: "Barbe noire"
- 2017: "Fuego" (feat. Ghost ST)
- 2017: "Dounia"
- 2017: "Yeah!"
- 2017: "Blanco Griselda"
- 2017: "T.R.W" (feat. Alonzo)
- 2017: "Bilal" (feat. 7Liwa)
- 2017: "Mi Amigo"

== Appearance in movies ==
- 2024: Barbès Little Algérie by Hassan Guerrar as Aziz

== See also ==
- Algerians in France
- List of Algerian artists
- Algerian hip-hop
- Music of Algeria
