= Black M discography =

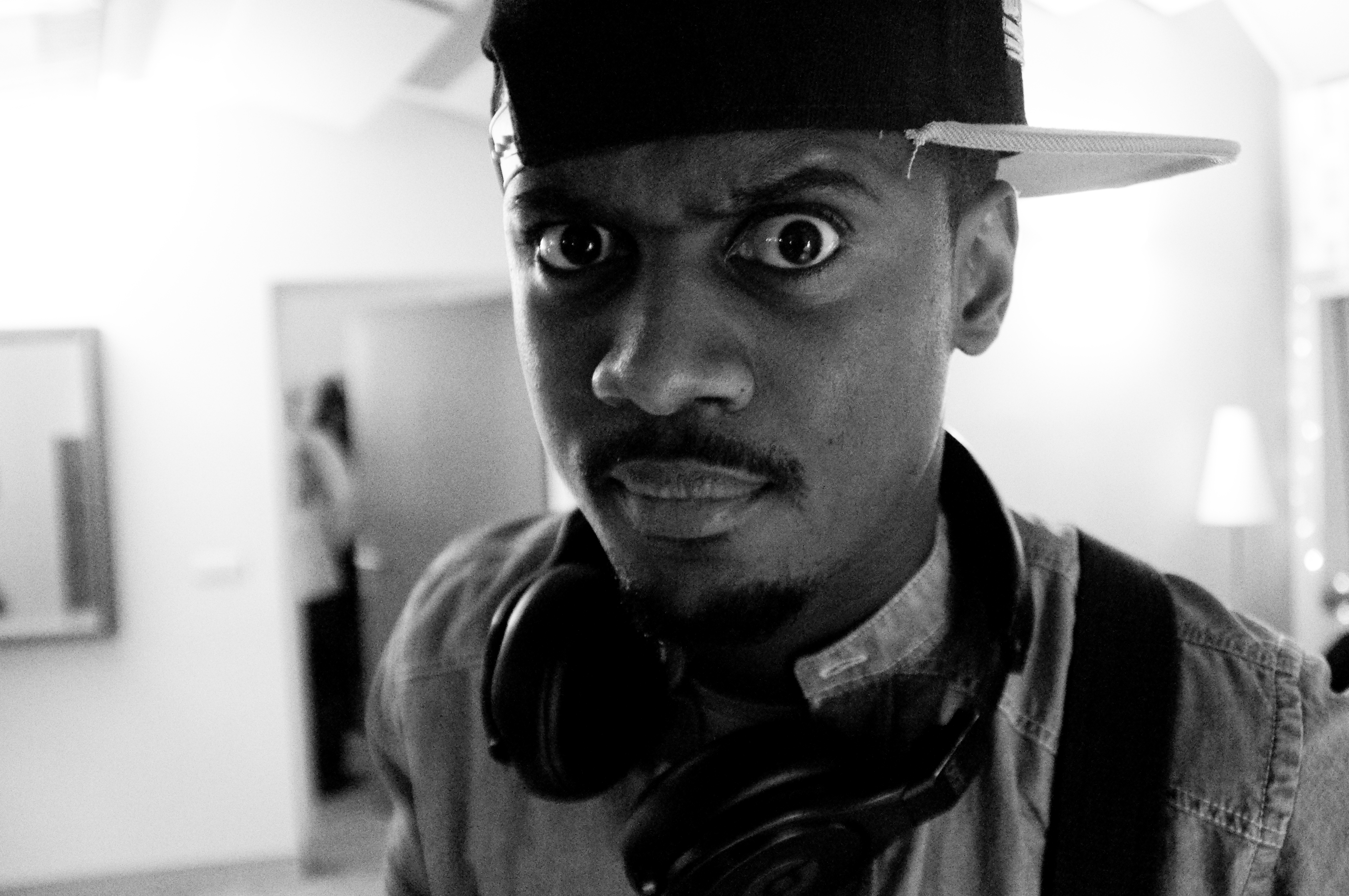
- Studio albums: 4
- EPs: 1
- Live albums: 1
- Singles: 33

Alpha Diallo, better known by his stage name Black Mesrimes or Black M (born 27 December 1984), is a French rapper, singer and songwriter.

== Albums ==
=== Studio albums ===
List of studio albums, with selected chart positions, sales figures and certifications
Title	Album details	Peak chart positions				Certifications
Title	Album details	FRA	BEL (Fl)	BEL (Wa)	SWI	Certifications
Les yeux plus gros que le monde	Released: 31 March 2014; Label: Wati B; Formats: CD, digital download	2	125	8	29	SNEP: Diamond
Éternel insatisfait	Released: 28 October 2016; Label: Wati B, Sony Music, Jive, Epic; Formats: CD, digital download	2	99	3	18	SNEP: 2× Platinum
Il était une fois...	Released: 13 September 2019; Label: Wati B, Sony Music; Formats: CD, digital download, streaming	9	—	18	—	
Alpha...	Released: 22 May 2021; Label: Wati B, Sony Music; Formats: CD, digital download	183	—	—	—	

=== Live albums ===
Title	Album details
Les yeux plus gros que l'Olympia	Released: 5 June 2015; Label: Wati B, Jive; Formats: CD, digital download

== EPs ==
Title	EP details
Le pacte (credited as Bakry et Black Mesrimes)	Released: 2005; Label: Self-released; Formats: CD, digital download

== Singles ==
List of singles as lead artist, with selected chart positions, showing year released and album name
Title	Year	Peak chart positions				Album
Title	Year	FRA	BEL (Fl)	BEL (Wa)	SWI	Album
"Mme Pavoshko"	2014	11	—	15	—	Les yeux plus gros que le monde
"Sur ma route"	2014	1	5	2	40	Les yeux plus gros que le monde
"La légende black" (featuring Dr. Beriz)	2014	8	—	19	—	Les yeux plus gros que le monde
"Je ne dirai rien" (featuring Shin Sekaï and Doomams)	2014	9	—	21	—	Les yeux plus gros que le monde
"Je garde le sourire"	2014	14	—	25	—	Les yeux plus gros que le monde
"On s'fait du mal"	2014	35	50	41	—	Les yeux plus gros que le monde
"Le prince Aladin" (featuring Kev Adams)	2015	3	—	5	—	Non-album singles
"La nuit porte conseil"	2016	33	—	—	—	Non-album singles
"A l'ouest" (featuring MHD)	2016	—	—	—	—	Éternel insatisfait
"Je suis chez moi"	2016	24	—	—	—	Éternel insatisfait
"#Askip"	2016	17	—	50	—	Éternel insatisfait
"French Kiss"	2016	26	—	31	—	Éternel insatisfait
"Comme moi" (featuring Shakira)	2017	35	—	—	—	Éternel insatisfait
"Dress Code" (featuring Kalash Criminel)	2017	—	—	—	—	Éternel insatisfait
"Tic-Tac"	2017	—	—	—	—	Éternel insatisfait
"Dans mon délire" (featuring Heuss l'Enfoiré and Soolking)	2019	138	—	15	—	Il était une fois...
"Grandir" (with Amir)	2023	—	—	50	—	Non-album single

== As featured artist ==
List of singles as a featured artist, with selected chart positions, showing year released and album name
Title	Year	Peak chart positions	Album
Title	Year	FRA	Album
"Pas de nouvelle bonne nouvelle" (DJ Abdel featuring Maître Gims and Black M)	2011	84	Evolution
"Ça décoiffe" (Maître Gims featuring JR O Crom and Black M)	2013	104	Subliminal
"Bubble Butt" (remix) (Major Lazer featuring Bruno Mars, 2 Chainz, Tyga, Mystic and Black M)	2013	—	Free the Universe
"Profiter de ma life" (Maska featuring Dr Berize and Black M)	2014	72	Espace-temps
"Aucun mytho" (H Magnum featuring Black M)	2015	21	Gotham City
"Adios" (Abou Debeing featuring Black M)	2015	167	Non-album single
"Illegal" (Gradur featuring Black M)	2016	134	ShegueyVara Vol. 2
"Comme Moi" (Shakira featuring Black M)	2017	4	El Dorado
"Je ne parle pas français" (Beatgees remix) (Namika featuring Black M)	2018	—	Que Walou

== Other charted songs ==
List of charted songs, with selected chart positions, showing year released and album name
Title	Year	Peak chart positions	Album
Title	Year	FRA	Album
"Ailleurs"	2014	45	Les yeux plus gros que le monde
"Spectateur"	2014	36	Les yeux plus gros que le monde
"À la vôtre" (featuring JR O Crom, Dry and Big Ali)	2014	27	Les yeux plus gros que le monde
"À force d'être"	2014	165	Les yeux plus gros que le monde
"C'est tout moi"	2014	49	Les yeux plus gros que le monde
"Pour oublier"	2014	123	Les yeux plus gros que le monde
"Money"	2014	192	Les yeux plus gros que le monde
"Jessica"	2014	183	Les yeux plus gros que le monde
"Qataris"	2014	114	Les yeux plus gros que le monde
"Casse pas ton dos"	2014	25	Les yeux plus gros que le monde
"Le regard des gens"	2014	24	Les yeux plus gros que le monde
"Solitaire"	2014	185	Les yeux plus gros que le monde
"Blacklines"	2014	184	Les yeux plus gros que le monde
"Foutue mélodie"	2014	56	Les yeux plus gros que le monde
"Black Shady, Pt. 3"	2014	187	Les yeux plus gros que le monde
"Cheveux blancs"	2016	147	Éternel insatisfait
"Tout ce qu'il faut" (featuring Gradur, Alonzo and Abou Debeing)	2016	146	Éternel insatisfait
"Parle-moi" (featuring Zaho)	2016	156	Éternel insatisfait
"Frérot" (featuring Soprano)	2016	33	Éternel insatisfait
"Le plus fort du monde"	2018	144	
"Tout se passe après minuit"	2018	116	
