= List of top 10 singles in 2013 (France) =

This is a list of singles that have peaked in the top 10 of the French Singles Chart in 2013.

== Top 10 singles ==
Entry date	Artist(s)	Single	Peak	Peak date	Weeks in Top 10
Singles from 2012
23 September	Asaf Avidan	"One Day / Reckoning Song"	2	3 February	24
25 November	will.i.am featuring Britney Spears	"Scream & Shout"	1	20 January	16
25 November	Bruno Mars	"Locked Out of Heaven" ^{[E]}	3	24 February	24
16 December	Birdy	"People Help the People" ^{[B]}	7	6 January	6
Singles from 2013
13 January	David Bowie	"Where Are We Now?"	9	13 January	1
13 January	Macklemore & Ryan Lewis featuring Wanz	"Thrift Shop"	1	27 January	18
20 January	Wati B featuring Big Ali	"WatiBigali"	9	20 January	1
20 January	Justin Timberlake featuring Jay-Z	"Suit & Tie"	8	20 January	1
27 January	Booba	"A.C. Milan"	7	27 January	1
3 February	Bingo Players featuring Far East Movement	"Get Up (Rattle)" ^{[C]}	8	10 February	4
3 February	Rihanna featuring Mikky Ekko	"Stay"	2	17 February	11
10 February	Olympe	"Born to Die"	9	10 February	1
24 February	Alt-J	"Matilda"	6	24 February	1
24 February	Baauer	"Harlem Shake"	4	3 March	4
24 February	Youssoupha and Ayna	"On se connaît" ^{[D]}	9	24 March	4
3 March	We Were Evergreen	"Leeway"	6	3 March	1
10 March	The Supermen Lovers	"C'est bon"	7	10 March	1
10 March	Mylène Farmer	"Je te dis tout"	3	10 March	1
10 March	The Lumineers	"Ho Hey" ^{[H]}	6	17 March	10
17 March	Les Enfoirés	"Attention au départ"	5	24 March	3
17 March	Maître Gims	"J'me tire"	1	24 March	15
17 March	Macklemore & Ryan Lewis featuring Ray Dalton	"Can't Hold Us"	3	7 April	16
24 March	Bruno Mars	"When I Was Your Man" ^{[G]}	9	31 March	5
24 March	Pink featuring Nate Ruess	"Just Give Me a Reason" ^{[H]}	4	31 March	9
31 March	David Guetta featuring Ne-Yo and Akon	"Play Hard" ^{[F]}^{[I]}^{[J]}	7	31 March	11
7 April	Robin Thicke featuring T.I. and Pharrell Williams	"Blurred Lines"	1	9 June	26
14 April	Alex Hepburn	"Under"	2	21 April	9
21 April	Maude	"Love Is What You Make of It"	3	21 April	1
21 April	Daft Punk featuring Pharrell Williams	"Get Lucky"	1	21 April	22
12 May	Maître Gims	"Bella"	3	26 May	18
19 May	Sébastien Patoche	"Quand il pète il troue son slip"	2	19 May	1
19 May	Major Lazer featuring Busy Signal, The Flexican and FS Green	"Watch Out for This (Bumaye)"	4	9 June	13
26 May	Edward Sharpe and the Magnetic Zeros	"Home"	7	26 May	2
2 June	2 Chainz and Wiz Khalifa	"We Own It (Fast & Furious)"	9	2 June	1
2 June	Passenger	"Let Her Go"	6	30 June	10
9 June	James Arthur	"Impossible" ^{[U]}	6	23 June	14
9 June	Stromae	"Formidable" ^{[K]}	1	8 September	24
16 June	Stromae	"Papaoutai" ^{[V]}	1	28 July	21
30 June	Bruno Mars	"Treasure" ^{[L]}	6	28 July	10
7 July	Avicii	"Wake Me Up"	1	25 August	18
28 July	Calvin Harris featuring Ellie Goulding	"I Need Your Love"	10	28 July	1
4 August	Keen'V	"La vie du bon côté" ^{[M]}	6	4 August	3
18 August	Lady Gaga	"Applause"	3	18 August	2
18 August	Martin Garrix	"Animals"	2	29 September	12
18 August	Katy Perry	"Roar" ^{[N]}^{[Q]}	5	27 October	7
1 September	John Newman	"Love Me Again" ^{[P]}	7	8 September	6
15 September	Bakermat	"Vandaag"	1	20 October	8
15 September	Miley Cyrus	"Wrecking Ball" ^{[O]}^{[R]}^{[S]}	2	1 December	8
22 September	Britney Spears	"Work Bitch"	6	22 September	1
22 September	Naughty Boy featuring Sam Smith	"La La La"	6	29 September	6
29 September	Birdy	"Wings"	8	29 September	1
6 October	Lana Del Rey and Cédric Gervais	"Summertime Sadness"	10	6 October	1
6 October	Détroit	"Droit dans le soleil"	9	6 October	1
6 October	Vitaa and Maître Gims	"Game Over"	1	27 October	9
13 October	Eminem	"Berzerk"	10	13 October	1
13 October	Mylène Farmer	"Monkey Me"	3	13 October	1
20 October	DVBBS and Borgeous	"Tsunami"	3	3 November	7
20 October	Jason Derulo featuring 2 Chainz	"Talk Dirty"	3	10 November	7
27 October	Lady Gaga featuring R. Kelly	"Do What U Want" ^{[T]}	8	27 October	2
3 November	Lady Gaga	"Venus"	9	3 November	1
3 November	Eminem featuring Rihanna	"The Monster" ^{[W]}	1	3 November	7
10 November	Lady Gaga	"Dope"	8	10 November	1
10 November	Lorde	"Royals" ^{[V]}	7	10 November	6
10 November	Booba	"Parlons peu"	5	10 November	1
10 November	Avicii	"Hey Brother"	4	24 November	8
17 November	Ellie Goulding	"Burn"	9	17 November	1
17 November	Jabberwocky	"Photomaton" ^{[T]}	2	17 November	5
17 November	Stromae	"Tous les mêmes"	1	24 November	7
24 November	Pharrell Williams	"Happy"	1	1 December	6
8 December	Maître Gims	"Zombie"	3	8 December	4
8 December	Bénabar, Patrick Bruel, Cali and Marina	"Un arc en ciel"	1	8 December	1
15 December	Maître Gims	"Changer"	9	15 December	1
15 December	Pitbull featuring Kesha	"Timber"	8	15 December	1
22 December	New World Sound and Thomas Newson	"Flute"	10	22 December	1
29 December	Indila	"Dernière danse"	10	29 December	1

== 2012 peaks ==
Entry date	Artist(s)	Single	Peak	Peak date	Weeks in Top 10
19 February	Kavinsky featuring Lovefoxxx	"Nightcall" ^{[A]}	10	19 February	2
30 September	Rihanna	"Diamonds"	1	30 September	21
30 September	Psy	"Gangnam Style"	1	21 October	23
7 October	Adele	"Skyfall"	1	4 November	24
11 November	Alicia Keys	"Girl on Fire"	5	18 November	9
18 November	Emeli Sandé	"Read All About It (Part III)"	7	18 November	11
2 December	Pulcino Pio	"Le poussin piou"	9	2 December	3

== Notes ==
- ^{A} - The single re-entered the Top 10 on the week ending 27 January 2013.
- ^{B} - The single re-entered the Top 10 on the week ending 17 February 2013.
- ^{C} - The single re-entered the Top 10 on the week ending 3 March 2013.
- ^{D} - The single re-entered the Top 10 on the week ending 10 March 2013.
- ^{E} - The single re-entered the Top 10 on the week ending 21 April 2013.
- ^{F} - The single re-entered the Top 10 on the week ending 28 April 2013.
- ^{G} - The single re-entered the Top 10 on the week ending 12 May 2013.
- ^{H} - The single re-entered the Top 10 on the week ending 19 May 2013.
- ^{I} - The single re-entered the Top 10 on the week ending 26 May 2013.
- ^{J} - The single re-entered the Top 10 on the week ending 30 June 2013.
- ^{K} - The single re-entered the Top 10 on the week ending 11 August 2013.
- ^{L} - The single re-entered the Top 10 on the week ending 25 August 2013.
- ^{M} - The single re-entered the Top 10 on the week ending 8 September 2013.
- ^{N} - The single re-entered the Top 10 on the week ending 15 September 2013.
- ^{O} - The single re-entered the Top 10 on the week ending 13 October 2013.
- ^{P} - The single re-entered the Top 10 on the week ending 20 October 2013.
- ^{Q} - The single re-entered the Top 10 on the week ending 27 October 2013.
- ^{R} - The single re-entered the Top 10 on the week ending 10 November 2013.
- ^{S} - The single re-entered the Top 10 on the week ending 1 December 2013.
- ^{T} - The single re-entered the Top 10 on the week ending 8 December 2013.
- ^{U} - The single re-entered the Top 10 on the week ending 15 December 2013.
- ^{V} - The single re-entered the Top 10 on the week ending 22 December 2013.
- ^{W} - The single re-entered the Top 10 on the week ending 29 December 2013.

== See also ==
- 2013 in music
- List of number-one hits of 2013 (France)
