= 2016 in French music =

The following is a list of notable events that are related to French music in 2016.

== Albums released ==
=== January ===
- 22 January : H Magnum - Gotham City
- 26 January : Dionysos - Vampire en pyjama
- 29 January : Lefa - Monsieur Fall

=== February ===
- 5 February : Joyce Jonathan - Une place pour moi
- 5 February : Kohndo - Intra-Muros
- 5 February : Pascal Obispo - Billet de femme
- 5 February : Salvatore Adamo - L'amour n'a jamais tort
- 26 February : Brav - ERROR 404
- 26 February : Emji - Folies douces
- 26 February : Jazzy Bazz - P-Town
- 26 February : Kool Shen - Sur le fil du rasoir
- 26 February : Nakk Mendosa - Darksun 2

=== March ===
- 4 March : 13 Block - Violence Urbaine Émeute
- 4 March : La Fouine - Nouveau Monde
- 4 March : Lartiste - Maestro
- 11 March : Fababy - Ange & Démon
- 25 March : The Shin Sekaï - Indéfini

=== April ===
- 1 April : Mickey 3D - Sebolavy
- 8 April : Christophe - Les Vestiges du chaos
- 8 April : Gaspard Royant - Have You Met Gaspard Royant?
- 8 April : M83 - Junk
- 8 April : Renaud - Renaud / Toujours debout
- 8 April : Sultan - Condamné à Régner
- 15 April : Jean-Louis Murat - Morituri
- 15 April : MHD - MHD
- 22 April : Benjamin Biolay - Hollywood Palermo
- 22 April : Griefjoy - Godspeed
- 22 April : MZ - La Dictature
- 29 April : Hooss - French Riviera, Vol.2
- 29 April : Tiers Monde - No Future

=== May ===
- 6 May : Djadja & Dinaz - On s'promet
- 13 May : Christophe Maé - L'attrape-rêves
- 20 May : Alonzo - Avenue de Saint-Antoine
- 20 May : FK - Purple Kemet
- 20 May : GLK - Murder
- 20 May : PSO Thug - Demoniak
- 27 May : Keny Arkana - État d'urgence
- 27 May : Miossec - Mammifères
- 27 May : Niro : Or Game
- 27 May : SCH

=== June ===
- 3 June : Guizmo - #GPG
- 3 June : Niska - Zifukoro
- 3 June : Superbus - Sixtape
- 10 June : Air - Twentyears
- 17 June : Gojira - Magma
- 17 June : S-Crew - Destins liés
- 24 June : Alkpote - Sadisme et Perversion
- 24 June : Jul - Émotions
- 24 June : Souf - Alchimie

=== September ===
- Kery James : TBD

=== October ===
- 28 October: Black M - Éternel insatisfait

=== November ===
- 18 November: Justice - Woman
