= MHD =

MHD may refer to:

- MHD (rapper), a French rapper from the 19th arrondissement of Paris
  - MHD (album), the rapper's 2016 debut album
- MHD, former name of the HDTV network for MTV, VH1, Palladia, and CMT now known as MTV Live
- Mashhad International Airport's IATA code
- Magnetohydrodynamics, the study of the magnetic properties and behaviour of electrically conducting fluids
  - Magnetohydrodynamics (journal)
- Malteser International, an aid agency
- Menstrual Hygiene Day, a day to raise awareness about menstrual hygiene management issues
- Military history detachment, a unit of United States Army
- Mindesthaltbarkeitsdatum, the German term for shelf life, printed on imported German food or medical products
- Doctor of Marine Histories (DMH, formerly Marine Histories Doctorate or MHD), such as issued by Sea Research Society's College of Marine Arts
- GNU libmicrohttpd, an embeddable HTTP server
- Airline code for CAAC Airlines
- Městská hromadná doprava (Czech) or mestská hromadná doprava (Slovak), public transport systems in Czech and Slovak cities
- Marblehead, a historic town located in Massachusetts
