= List of number-one hits of 2013 (France) =

This is a list of the French SNEP Top 100 Singles and Top 200 Albums number ones of 2013.

== Number ones by week ==
=== Singles chart ===
Week	Issue date	Artist(s)	Title	Sales	Ref.
1	6 January	Psy	"Gangnam Style"	15,900	
2	13 January	Psy	"Gangnam Style"		
3	20 January	will.i.am featuring Britney Spears	"Scream & Shout"		
4	27 January	Macklemore and Ryan Lewis featuring Wanz	"Thrift Shop"	9,700	
5	3 February	Macklemore and Ryan Lewis featuring Wanz	"Thrift Shop"	12,200	
6	10 February	Macklemore and Ryan Lewis featuring Wanz	"Thrift Shop"	13,700	
7	17 February	Macklemore and Ryan Lewis featuring Wanz	"Thrift Shop"	13,100	
8	24 February	Macklemore and Ryan Lewis featuring Wanz	"Thrift Shop"		
9	3 March	Macklemore and Ryan Lewis featuring Wanz	"Thrift Shop"	11,900	
10	10 March	Macklemore and Ryan Lewis featuring Wanz	"Thrift Shop"	11,700	
11	17 March	Macklemore and Ryan Lewis featuring Wanz	"Thrift Shop"		
12	24 March	Maître Gims	"J'me tire"	11,282	
13	31 March	Maître Gims	"J'me tire"		
14	7 April	Maître Gims	"J'me tire"		
15	14 April	Maître Gims	"J'me tire"		
16	21 April	Daft Punk featuring Pharrell Williams	"Get Lucky"		
17	28 April	Daft Punk featuring Pharrell Williams	"Get Lucky"		
18	5 May	Daft Punk featuring Pharrell Williams	"Get Lucky"		
19	12 May	Daft Punk featuring Pharrell Williams	"Get Lucky"		
20	19 May	Daft Punk featuring Pharrell Williams	"Get Lucky"		
21	26 May	Daft Punk featuring Pharrell Williams	"Get Lucky"		
22	2 June	Daft Punk featuring Pharrell Williams	"Get Lucky"		
23	9 June	Robin Thicke featuring T.I. and Pharrell	"Blurred Lines"		
24	16 June	Robin Thicke featuring T.I. and Pharrell	"Blurred Lines"		
25	23 June	Robin Thicke featuring T.I. and Pharrell	"Blurred Lines"		
26	30 June	Robin Thicke featuring T.I. and Pharrell	"Blurred Lines"		
27	7 July	Daft Punk featuring Pharrell Williams	"Get Lucky"		
28	14 July	Robin Thicke featuring T.I. and Pharrell	"Blurred Lines"		
29	21 July	Robin Thicke featuring T.I. and Pharrell	"Blurred Lines"		
30	28 July	Stromae	"Papaoutai"		
31	4 August	Stromae	"Papaoutai"		
32	11 August	Stromae	"Papaoutai"		
33	18 August	Stromae	"Papaoutai"		
34	25 August	Avicii	"Wake Me Up"	10,500	
35	1 September	Avicii	"Wake Me Up"		
36	8 September	Stromae	"Formidable"		
37	15 September	Stromae	"Formidable"		
38	22 September	Stromae	"Formidable"		
39	29 September	Stromae	"Formidable"		
40	6 October	Stromae	"Formidable"		
41	13 October	Stromae	"Formidable"		
42	20 October	Bakermat	"Vandaag"		
43	27 October	Vitaa and Maître Gims	"Game Over"		
44	3 November	Eminem featuring Rihanna	"The Monster"		
45	10 November	Eminem featuring Rihanna	"The Monster"		
46	17 November	Eminem featuring Rihanna	"The Monster"		
47	24 November	Stromae	"Tous les mêmes"		
48	1 December	Pharrell Williams	"Happy"		
49	8 December	Bénabar, Patrick Bruel, Cali and Marina	"Un arc en ciel"		
50	15 December	Pharrell Williams	"Happy"		
51	22 December	Pharrell Williams	"Happy"		
52	29 December	Pharrell Williams	"Happy"		

=== Albums chart ===
Week	Issue date	Artist(s)	Title	Sales	Ref.
1	6 January	Various artists	Génération Goldman		
2	13 January	Various artists	Génération Goldman		
3	20 January	Various artists	Génération Goldman		
4	27 January	Various artists	Génération Goldman		
5	3 February	Various artists	Génération Goldman		
6	10 February	La Fouine	Drôle de parcours		
7	17 February	Indochine	Black City Parade		
8	24 February	Indochine	Black City Parade		
9	3 March	Various artists	Génération Goldman		
10	10 March	M. Pokora	À la poursuite du bonheur Tour - Live à Bercy		
11	17 March	Les Enfoirés	La Boîte à musique des Enfoirés		
12	24 March	Les Enfoirés	La Boîte à musique des Enfoirés		
13	31 March	Les Enfoirés	La Boîte à musique des Enfoirés		
14	7 April	Les Enfoirés	La Boîte à musique des Enfoirés		
15	14 April	Les Enfoirés	La Boîte à musique des Enfoirés		
16	21 April	Lara Fabian	Le Secret		
17	28 April	IAM	Arts Martiens		
18	5 May	Emmanuel Moire	Le Chemin		
19	12 May	Seth Gueko	Bad Cowboy		
20	19 May	Vanessa Paradis	Love Songs		
21	26 May	Daft Punk	Random Access Memories		
22	2 June	Daft Punk	Random Access Memories		
23	9 June	Daft Punk	Random Access Memories		
24	16 June	Christophe Maé	Je veux du bonheur		
25	23 June	Christophe Maé	Je veux du bonheur		
26	30 June	Christophe Maé	Je veux du bonheur		
27	7 July	Daft Punk	Random Access Memories		
28	14 July	Sébastien Patoche	J'emmerde les Bobos		
29	21 July	Daft Punk	Random Access Memories		
30	28 July	Olympe	Olympe		
31	4 August	Keen'V	Ange ou démon		
32	11 August	Luc Arbogast	Odysseus		
33	18 August	Luc Arbogast	Odysseus		
34	25 August	Stromae	Racine carrée		
35	1 September	Various artists	Génération Goldman Volume 2		
36	8 September	Stromae	Racine carrée		
37	15 September	Stromae	Racine carrée		
38	22 September	Stromae	Racine carrée		
39	29 September	Stromae	Racine carrée		
40	6 October	Stromae	Racine carrée		
41	13 October	Stromae	Racine carrée		
42	20 October	Stromae	Racine carrée		
43	27 October	Stromae	Racine carrée		
44	3 November	Stromae	Racine carrée		
45	10 November	Florent Pagny	Vieillir avec toi		
46	17 November	Stromae	Racine carrée		
47	24 November	Stromae	Racine carrée		
48	1 December	Stromae	Racine carrée		
49	8 December	Stromae	Racine carrée		
50	15 December	Stromae	Racine carrée		
51	22 December	Stromae	Racine carrée		
52	29 December	Stromae	Racine carrée		

== See also ==
- 2013 in music
- List of number-one hits (France)
- List of top 10 singles in 2013 (France)
