= Je ne parle pas français (song) =

Single by Namika featuring Black M
- Released: 13 April 2018
- Recorded: 2018
- Genre: Hip hop
- Length: 3:57
- Songwriter(s): Beatgees; Hanan Hamadi

Namika singles chronology
"Kompliziert" (2016)	"Je ne parle pas français" (2018)

Black M singles chronology
"Comme moi" (2017)	"Je ne parle pas français"

Music video
- "Je ne parle pas français" on YouTube

"Je ne parle pas français" (French for 'I do not speak French') is a song by German singer Namika featuring French rapper Black M released on 13 April 2018.

== Charts ==
Chart performance for "Je ne parle pas français"
Chart (2018)	Peak position
Austria (Ö3 Austria Top 40)	16
Germany (GfK)	1
Switzerland (Schweizer Hitparade)	7

== Certifications ==
Region	Certification	Certified units/sales
Austria (IFPI Austria)	Gold	15,000^{‡}
Germany (BVMI)	Platinum	400,000^{‡}
Switzerland (IFPI Switzerland)	2× Platinum	40,000^{‡}
^{‡} Sales+streaming figures based on certification alone.
