= Namika =

German singer and rapper

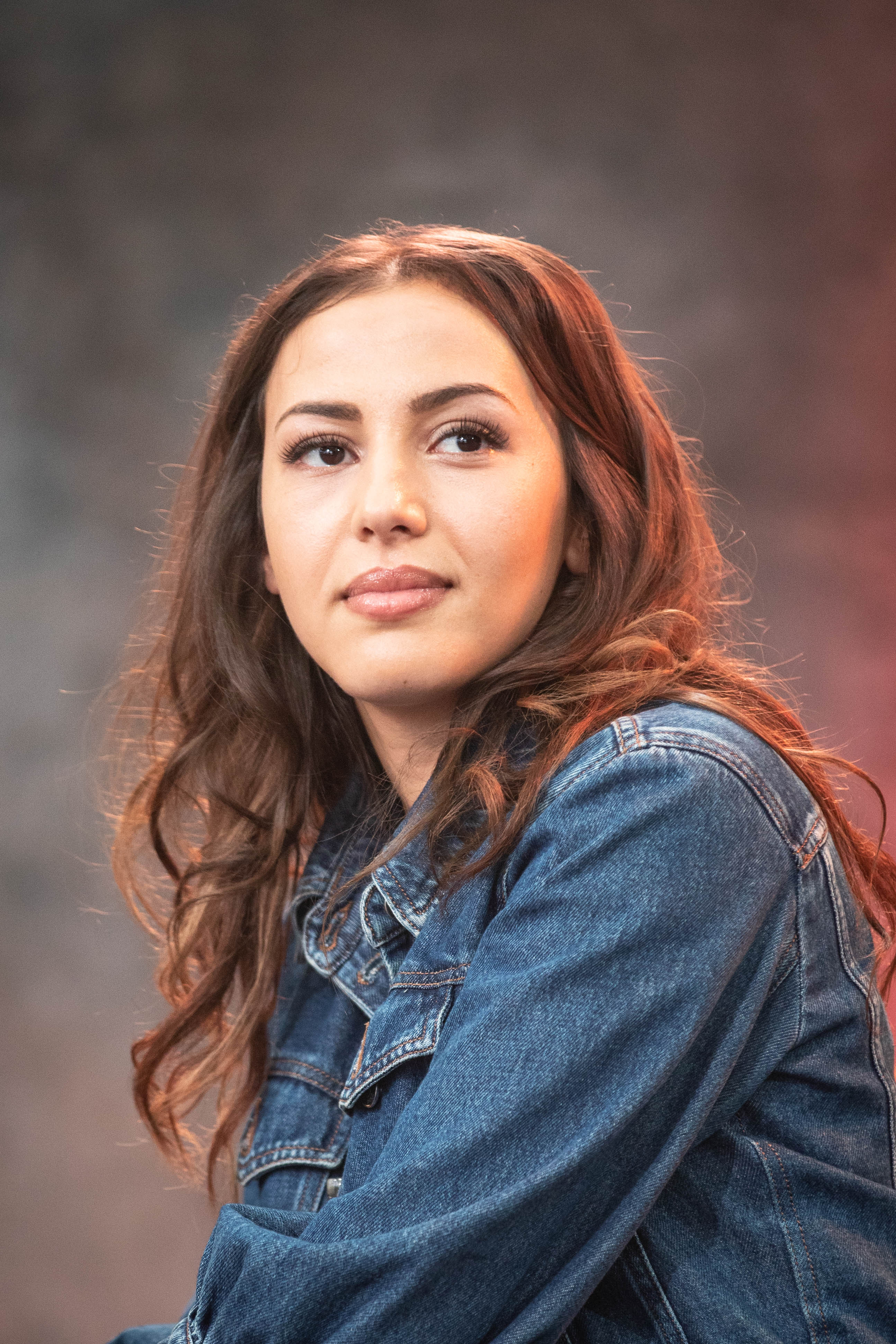
- Namika at the SWR3 New Pop Festival, 2018

Background information
- Also known as: Hän Violett
- Born: Hanan Hamdi; 23 August 1991 (age 35); Frankfurt, Germany
- Origin: Frankfurt, Germany
- Genres: Hip hop; jazz; pop
- Occupations: Singer; rapper
- Years active: 2013–present
- Label: Sony Music Entertainment
- Website: www.namikamusik.de

Hanan Hamdi (Arabic: حنان حمدي; born 23 August 1991), better known by her stage names Namika and Hän Violett, is a German singer and rapper.

== Biography ==
Hamdi was born and grew up in Frankfurt. Her parents are Berbers from the Moroccan coastal city of Nador.

She released her debut album, Nador, on 21 July 2015. The album includes her first single, "Lieblingsmensch". By the end of July 2015 the album had reached number thirteen in the German album charts. The single Lieblingsmensch debuted at number twenty-seven in the German single charts and climbed to number one after eight weeks.

Hamdi has published seven music videos, including the song Na-Mi-Ka, which is from her EP Hellwach. Hamdi entered a specially edited version of her song Hellwach (English: Wide Awake) in the Bundesvision Song Contest 2015. The track was produced by the German producer team Beatgees, who has also produced for Lena, Curse, and Ann Sophie. She represented the State of Hessen. By the end of the competition on 29 August 2015 the song had reached seventh place. In 2018 she released "Je ne parle pas français", the remix of which features French rapper Black M. The song reached number one in the German charts. On 1 July, she released her second studio album Que Walou.

Hamdi performed three songs as a competitor in the 2015 New Music Award competition.

== Discography ==
=== Albums ===
Title	Details	Peak chart positions		
Title	Details	GER	AUT	SWI
Nador	Released: 24 July 2015; Label: Sony Music; Formats: CD, digital download	13	58	36
Que Walou	Released: 1 June 2018; Label: Sony Music; Formats: CD, digital download	12	46	29

=== Extended plays ===
Title	Details
Hellwach	Released: 2015; Label: Sony Music; Format: Digital download

=== Singles ===
Title	Year	Peak chart positions			Certifications	Album
Title	Year	GER	AUT	SWI	Certifications	Album
"Lieblingsmensch"	2015	1	2	14	GER: 3× Gold; AUT: Gold; SWI: Gold	Nador
"Hellwach"	2015	62	—	—		Nador
"Kompliziert"	2016	60	—	—		Nador
"Je ne parle pas français (Beatgees Remix)" (featuring Black M)	2018	1	16	7	GER: Platinum; AUT: Gold; SWI: Platinum	Que Walou

Other releases

- 2013: Flow zum Gesang (as Hän Violett)
- 2015: Nador
- 2015: Wenn sie kommen (feat. Ali As)
- 2015: Na-Mi-Ka
- 2015: Mein Film (feat. MoTrip)
- 2016: Zauberland
- 2018: Ahmed (1960–2002)
- 2018: Que Walou
- 2018: Ich will dich vermissen
- 2018: Zirkus
- 2018 Phantom
- 2018 Das Deutschlandlied - Live

==== As featured artist ====
Title	Year	Peak chart positions	Certifications	Album
Title	Year	GER	Certifications	Album
"Lass sie tanzen" (Ali As featuring Namika)	2016	37	GER: Gold	Euphoria
"Traum" (Ufo361 featuring Namika)	2017	—		Ich bin 3 Berliner
"Holidays Are Coming" (The Kingdom Choir featuring Camélia Jordana & Namika)	2018	97		Non-album single

== Awards ==
- 1Live Krone 2015: Nominated for Best Female Artist
