= Alpha (Black M album) =

Studio album by Black M
- Released: May 21, 2021 (part 1)
- Recorded: 2020–2021
- Genre: Hip hop; R&B
- Length: 43:51 (part 1)
- Label: Wati B
- Producer: Black M, MKL, Alchimeek, Dany Synthé, Remed, FB Cool, Hcue, Djaresma

Black M chronology
Il était une fois... (2019)	Alpha (2021)	La Légende Black (2023)

Singles from Alpha
- 1. "Black Shady, Partie 4" Released: 27 December 2020; 2. "À la base" Released: 13 January 2021; 3. "César" Released: 22 January 2021; 4. "N.S.E.G." Released: 2 April 2021; 5. "À la tienne" Released: 7 May 2021; 6. "N.S.E.G. (Remix)" Released: 21 May 2021; 7. "Week-end" Released: 24 July 2021

Alpha is the fourth studio album by French rapper Black M. It was released on 21 May 2021 by Wati B. This is his only free album. It is composed of 14 songs including 5 featuring Gims, Soulby THB Worbhé, MC Fressh and Les Twins.

== History ==
During the evening of 26 December 2020, Black M began to "clash" his co-operative from the Sexion d'Assaut, Gims as well as Kev Adams on Twitter, which put Internet users in doubt, thinking that his account had been hacked. It even caught the attention of Booba on the other side of the earth (Black M even went to his concert in 2015 at the Accor Arena and was even able to benefit from his support the following year during the controversy over his canceled concert for the celebration of the centenary of the Battle of Verdun). Indeed, the latter, who is in clash with some members of the Sexion d'Assaut such as Gims or Barack Adama, began to clash Black M in turn by saying that his "clash" was a coup de comm ' for the output of a new sound. The following day (Black M's birthday) 27 December 2020, he released "Black Shady, Pt. 4", a commentary on 2020 delivered in the style of an alter-ego inspired by Eminem's Slim Shady. At the same time, he announces that the first part of his fourth album Alpha will be released in March 2021 as an Extended play. On 13 January 2021, Black M released the second single from his album entitled "À la base".

On 22 January 2021, Black M released the third single, "César" featuring Gims. This is the first feature on the album, as well as the second collaboration between the two members of the Sexion d'Assaut, 8 years after the first in "Ça décoiffe", from Gims's debut album, Subliminal. On April 2 of 2021, Black M released the fourth single, "N.S.E.G." (Nous Sommes En Guerre). The song is influenced by trap and drill music.

On 6 May 2021, Black M unveiled the track list of part 1 of his album with his son "Mowgly". Composed of 14 tracks in addition to the feat with Gims on "César", it also features four Guinean rappers including a duo: Soulby THB and Worbhé (group made up of Sleyfa, the cousin of Black M and Zerfry, the little brother of Black M) on the title Crack, MC Freshh on the title Million still in the company of Soulby THB and again Worbhé on the title 2h in the morning. The duo Les Twins is featured on a remix of "N.S.E.G.". The next day, 7 May 2021 at midnight, Black M sends the fifth single from Alpha, Pt. 1 titled "À la Tienne" on streaming platforms. In addition, the EP is finally available for pre-order. On May 20–21, 2021, Black M hosted a live stream on YouTube with comedian Greg Guillotin to discuss the album.

On 21 May 2021, upon the release of the EP, Black M released two music videos: the remix of "N.S.E.G." featuring Les Twins, and a clip of "À la tienne." On 24 July 2021, Black M unveiled the clip for "Week-end". In April 2022, he announces that the album Alpha will be named La légende Black.

== Track listing ==
Alpha, Part 1
No.	Title	Lyrics	Producer(s)	Length
1.	"Essayer"	Black M	Hcue; FB Cool	2:59
2.	"Black Shady, Pt. 4"	Black M	MKL	3:09
3.	"À la base"	Black M	Alchimeek	2:49
4.	"César" (feat. Gims)	Black M; Gims	Black M; Dany Synthé	3:18
5.	"N.S.E.G."	Black M	Remed; Dany Synthé	2:52
6.	"Crack" (feat. Soulby THB et Worbhé)	Black M; Soulby THB; Zerfry; Sleyfa	Remed; Hcue; FB Cool	6:56
7.	"Interlude Keugré"	Black M	Remed; Hcue; FB Cool	2:19
8.	"Million" (feat. Soulby THB et MC Freshh)	Black M; Soulby THB; MC Freshh	Remed; Hcue; FB Cool	4:36
9.	"Galère"	Black M	Remed; FB Cool	2:53
10.	"Terrain"	Black M	Remed	3:09
11.	"2h du mat" (feat. Worbhé)	Black M; Sleyfa; Zerfry	Dany Synthé	3:31
12.	"Week-end"	Black M	Djaresma	2:47
13.	"À la tienne"	Black M	Remed; FB Cool	2:58
14.	"N.S.E.G. (Remix)" (feat. Les Twins)	Black M; Ca Blaze; Lil Beast	Remed; Dany Synthé	2:56
