= Les yeux plus gros que le monde =

2014 debut studio album by Black M

Studio album by Black M
- Released: 31 March 2014
- Genres: hip hop, R&B
- Label: Wati B
- Producers: Renaud Rebillaud; Skalpovich

Black M chronology
Les yeux plus gros que le monde (2014)	Éternel insatisfait (2016)

Les yeux plus gros que le monde (literally The Eyes Greater than the World) is a 2014 album by the French-Guinean artist Black M. It was released on 31 March 2014 containing 19 tracks almost all of which appeared on SNEP based on downloads. The album sold 400,000 copies and was certified 3× platinum.

Owing to the great success of the album, the album was rereleased as a Deluxe Edition on 17 November 2014 with an additional CD of 8 tracks. To differentiate, the re-edition was titled Le Monde plus gros que mes yeux (meaning the World Greater than my Eyes).

In 2015, Black M released a live concert titled Les yeux plus gros que l'Olympia as an album registration and as DVD in which he interpreted almost all the tracks from Les yeux plus gros que le monde and follow-up Le monde plus gros que mes yeux with main invitees the Shin Sekaï, Sexion d'Assaut and with collaborations with Doomams, Abou de Being, Dry and Dr Berize.

== Genesis ==
In 2013, Gims released his album Subliminal which was a public success. Previously the two members of the group Sexion d'Assaut, toured the album L'Apogée (2012). During the tour, Black M writes the lyrics for album.

== Promotion ==
For the promotion of the album, Black M unveils as Maître Gims, a web series called Les pieds plus gros que ... where there are titles that are not in the album:

- Episode I: Les yeux plus gros que Beriz
- Episode II: Les yeux plus gros que le rap français
- Episode III: Les yeux plus gros que l'an 2014
- Episode IV: Les yeux plus gros que Youssoupha
- Episode V: Les yeux plus gros que Marseille ft. Alonzo

== Cover ==
The cover is a tribute to that of the Dangerous (1991) album by Michael Jackson. However, a good number of elements are changed for questions of rights.

== Track listing ==
=== Les yeux plus gros que le monde ===
No.	Title	Writer(s)	Producer(s)	Length
1.	"Intro"	Black M	Stan E	1:57
2.	"Ailleurs"	Black M	Black M, Renaud Rebillaud	4:04
3.	"Spectateur"	Black M	Black M, Renaud Rebillaud	3:49
4.	"Mme Pavoshko"	Black M	Black M, Renaud Rebillaud	4:15
5.	"À la vôtre" (feat. Big Ali, Dry and Jr O Crom)	Black M, JR O Crom, Dry, Big Ali	Stan E	4:40
6.	"À force d'être"	Black M	Black M, Stan E	4:46
7.	"C'est tout moi"	Black M	Black M, Renaud Rebillaud, Stan E	3:51
8.	"Pour oublier"	Black M	Black M, Renaud Rebillaud, Dany Synthé	4:01
9.	"La légende Black" (feat. Dr Beriz)	Black M, Dr Beriz	Dr Beriz, Renaud Rebillaud	3:48
10.	"Interlude"	Black M	Black M, Renaud Rebillaud	2:27
11.	"Money"	Black M	Stan E	4:15
12.	"Jessica"	Black M	Black M, Stan E	5:17
13.	"Je ne dirai rien" (feat. Shin Sekaï and Doomams)	Black M, Abou Tall, Dadju, Doomams	Black M, Stan E	4:17
14.	"Qataris"	Black M	Black M, Stan E	4:13
15.	"Casse pas ton dos"	Black M	Dany Synthé, Stan E	3:45
16.	"Le regard des gens"	Black M	Black M, Renaud Rebillaud	4:43
17.	"Solitaire"	Black M	Skalpovich	4:03
18.	"Blacklines"	Black M	Black M, Stan E	3:42
19.	"Sur ma route"	Black M	Skalpovich	4:12

=== Le monde plus gros que mes yeux (Reissue) ===
Le monde plus gros que mes yeux

Studio album by Black M
- Released: 17 November 2014
- Genres: Rap, R&B
- Label: Wati B
- Producers: Renaud Rebillaud; Skalpovich

Le Monde plus gros que mes yeux
No.	Title	Writer(s)	Producer(s)	Length
1.	"Je garde le sourire"	Black M	Black M, Renaud Rebillaud	3:54
2.	"Foutue mélodie"	Black M	Renaud Rebillaud	3:44
3.	"Ma musique"	Black M	Black M, Renaud Rebillaud, Stan E	4:20
4.	"Tout le monde me connaît" (feat. Abou Debeing and Stan E)	Black M, Abou Debeing, Stan E	Black M, Stan E	3:41
5.	"Jemaa El-Fna" (feat. Biwaï)	Black M, Biwaï	Black M, Stan E	3:49
6.	"Jette ton phone" (feat. Charly Bell)	Black M, Charly Bell	Stan E	3:48
7.	"Black Shady, Pt. 3"	Black M	Stan E	4:15
8.	"On s'fait du mal"	Black M	Renaud Rebillaud	3:35
Total length:				00:32

=== Les yeux plus gros que l'Olympia (live) ===
Les yeux plus gros que l'Olympia

Live album by Black M
- Released: 5 June 2015
- Genres: Rap, R&B
- Label: Wati B / Jive Records

1. "Solitaire" (intro) (1:39)
2. "Spectateur" (4:15)
3. "Mme Pavoshko" (4:20)
4. "On s'fait du mal" (3:29)
5. "Pour oublier" (4:37)
6. Medley – "Qataris", "À la vôtre", "Jemaa El-Fna" (5:03)
7. "Foutue mélodie" (4:10)
8. "Ma musique" (3:15)
9. "Le regard des gens" (4:37)
10. "Jessica" (2:19)
11. – Deuxième fois (The Shin Sekaï) (4:20)
12. "Je ne dirai rien" (Black M feat. The Shin Sekaï) (3:43)
13. Medley – "Disque d'or", "Qui t'a dit", "Balader", "Désolé" (Sexion d'Assaut) (5:13)
14. "La légende black" (Black M feat. Dr Berize) (8:54)
15. "C'est tout moi" (3:54)
16. "Le garde le sourire" (3:55)
17. "Sur ma route" (7:46)

=== Les yeux plus gros que l'Olympia (DVD / live) ===
1. "Solitaire" (intro)
2. "Spectateur"
3. "Mme Pavoshko"
4. "On s'fait du mal"
5. "Pour oublier"
6. Medley – "Qataris", "À la vôtre", "Jemaa El-Fna"
7. "Foutue mélodie"
8. "Ma musique"
9. "Le regard des gens"
10. "Jessica"
11. "Rêver" (The Shin Sekaï)
12. "Je reviendrai" (The Shin Sekaï)
13. "2ème fois" (The Shin Sekaï)
14. "Je ne dirai rien" (Black M feat. Shin Sekai and Doomams)
15. "Billet facile" (The Shin Sekaï, Abou de Being, Dry)
16. Medley - "Disque d'or", "Qui t'a dit", "Balader", "Désolé" (Sexion d'Assaut)
17. La légende black (Black M feat. Dr Berize)
18. "C'est tout moi"
19. "Je garde le sourire"
20. "Sur ma route"

== Charts ==
=== Weekly charts ===
Les yeux plus gros que le monde

Chart (2014)	Peak position
Belgian Albums (Ultratop Flanders)	125
Belgian Albums (Ultratop Wallonia)	13
French Albums (SNEP)	2
Swiss Albums (Schweizer Hitparade)	29

Le monde plus gros que l'Olympia (live)

Chart (2015)	Peak position
Belgian Albums (Ultratop Wallonia)	34
French Albums (SNEP)	24

=== Year-end charts ===
Les yeux plus gros que le monde

Chart (2014)	Position
Belgian Albums (Ultratop Wallonia)	33
French Albums (SNEP)	6

Chart (2015)	Position
Belgian Albums (Ultratop Wallonia)	15
French Albums (SNEP)	13

== Videography ==
- "Mme Pavoshko"
- "Spectateur"
- "Sur ma route"
- "A force d'être"
- "La légende Black"
- "Je ne dirai rien"
- "Je garde le sourire"
- "On s'fait du mal"
