= Je suis chez moi =

Single by Black M

from the album Éternel insatisfait
- Released: 25 July 2016
- Genre: French pop
- Length: 3:46
- Label: Wati B; Sony Music
- Songwriter(s): Black M
- Producer(s): Black M; Bastien Vincent; Renaud Rebillaud; Jonathan Ntsimi Menyie

Black M singles chronology
"A l'ouest" (2016)	"Je suis chez moi" (2016)	"Askip" (2016)

Music video
- "Je suis chez moi" on YouTube

"Je suis chez moi" is a song by French rapper Black M. It was released as the second single from his second studio album Éternel insatisfait. The song was a response to Marion Maréchal and the French far-right movements.

== Music video ==
The song's music video was released on 22 August 2016 as a short film written by Black M and directed by JHOS. It was shot in a countryside in a bus in France.

=== Controversy ===
The music video became controversial due to a message written in Black M's t-shirt, which was in memory of Adama Traoré. When it aired on W9, the message was blurred.

== Live performance ==
Black M performed the song on the eighth season of Touche pas à mon poste!

== Charts ==
Chart performance for "Je suis chez moi"
Chart (2016)	Peak position
France (SNEP)	22
