= Mon frère =

French drama film

- Directed by: Julien Abraham
- Screenplay by: Julien Abraham; Almamy Kanouté; Jimmy Laporal-Trésor
- Starring: MHD; Darren Muselet; Aïssa Maïga
- Production companies: Ex Nihilo; Diversy Films; Artside
- Distributed by: BAC Films; Netflix
- Release date: July 31, 2019
- Country: France
- Language: French

Mon frère is a 2019 French drama film directed and co-written by Julien Abraham, starring French rapper MHD. The plot revolves around Teddy (MHD) a young man who is accused of the murder of his violent father, when trying to protect his little brother from him. Teddy is then sent to a youth detention center, waiting for his trial for patricide.

== Cast ==
- Mohamed "MHD" Sylla as Teddy
- Darren Muselet as Enzo
- Aïssa Maïga as Claude
- Jalil Lespert as Igor
- Youssouf Gueye as Andy
- Hiam Abbass as Mme Miroun
- Lisette Malidor as the grandmother
- Mark Grosy as the father
- Neva Kehouane as the mother
- Almamy Kanoute as Papou
- Fatima Ait Bounoua as the French teacher
- Mathieu Longatte as Olivier (credited as Matthieu Longuatte)
- Najeto Injai as Mo
- Hakou Benosmane as Unsal
- Didier Michon as Moïse

== Production ==
Mon frère marks the film debut of French rapper Mohamed Sylla, also known as MHD, who rose to success in the mid-2010s through songs he published online. During production, MHD was arrested by French police and charged with second-degree murder in January 2019 following investigation into the death of a man in the streets of Paris. MHD, who claimed his innocence, was still remanded in custody at the time of the film's release.

== Release ==
Mon frère was released in French theaters on July 31, 2019.
