= Bella (Maître Gims song) =

2013 single by Gims

Single by Maître Gims

from the album Subliminal
- Released: 6 May 2013
- Recorded: 2012
- Genre: Pop; pop rap; latin pop
- Label: Wati B; Jive
- Songwriters: Renaud Rebillaud; Bastien Vincent; Gims
- Producer: Renaud Rebillaud

Maître Gims singles chronology
"J'me tire" (2013)	"Bella" (2013)	"VQ2PQ" (2013)

Music video
- "Bella" on YouTube

"Bella" is a song by Congolese singer and rapper Gims. It was released on 6 May 2013 as the third single off his album Subliminal.

== Background ==
In an interview, Gims said that he started working on the song in 2009.

== Music video ==
The music video was shot in Marbella, Andalusia, Spain and was released on the same day as the song's release. The video had gained 500 million views until June 2021.

== Charts ==
Chart performance for "Bella"
Chart	Peak position
Belgium (Ultratip Bubbling Under Flanders)	6
Belgium (Ultratop 50 Wallonia)	3
France (SNEP)	3
Switzerland (Schweizer Hitparade)	25

== Certifications ==
Certifications for "Bella"
Region	Certification	Certified units/sales
Belgium (BRMA)	Gold	15,000^{*}
France (SNEP)	Platinum	150,000^{*}
^{*} Sales figures based on certification alone.
