= Julien Abraham =

French film director and screenwriter (born 1976)

- Born: 14 May 1976 (age 48); Enghien-les-Bains
- Occupation: Director
- Years active: 2012–present

Julien Abraham (born 14 May 1976 in Enghien-les-Bains) is a French film director and screenwriter.

== Biography ==
Prior becoming a filmmaker, he studied Economics and Management at the Sorbonne. His first film as a director was a documentary "L'odyssée de musiques" in 2001; his feature films followed a decade later.

== Filmography ==
- La cité rose, 2012
- Made in China, 2019
- Mon frère, 2019
