= Sur ma route =

Single by Black M

from the album Les yeux plus gros que le monde
- Released: 24 March 2014
- Length: 4:12
- Label: Wati B; Sony Music Entertainment
- Songwriters: Black M, Skalpovich
- Producer: Skalpovich

Black M singles chronology
"Mme Pavoshko" (2014)	"Sur ma route" (2014)	"La légende Black" (2014)

Music video
- "Sur ma route" on YouTube

"Sur ma route" is a song by French-Guinean rapper, Black M. Written by Black M and Skalpovich and produced by the latter. The song's title is "On my way" in French.

The song was released as the second single from Black M's debut studio album, Les yeux plus gros que le monde (2014). The song became Black M's first number-one hit in his native country and also charted within the top ten in Belgium (Flanders and Wallonia) and the top forty in Switzerland.

== Music video ==
The music video, released through VEVO on May 30, 2014, depicts Black M as the main characters of several iconic films and impersonating actors such as The Shawshank Redemption, Forrest Gump, The Dark Knight, Captain Harlock, Rocky, Charlie Chaplin, The Lord of the Rings trilogy and Gravity.

== Charts ==
=== Weekly charts ===
Chart (2014)	Peak position
Belgium (Ultratop 50 Flanders)	5
Belgium (Ultratop 50 Wallonia)	2
France (SNEP)	1
Switzerland (Schweizer Hitparade)	40

=== Year-end charts ===
Chart (2014)	Position
Belgium (Ultratop Flanders)	40
Belgium (Ultratop Wallonia)	6
France (SNEP)	6
Chart (2015)	Position
Belgium (Ultratop Wallonia)	32
France (SNEP)	71

== Certifications ==
Region	Certification	Certified units/sales
Belgium (BRMA)	Platinum	30,000^{*}
France (SNEP)	Gold	75,000^{*}
^{*} Sales figures based on certification alone.
