= Éternel insatisfait =

Studio album by Black M
- Released: 28 October 2016
- Recorded: 2014–2016
- Genre: French hip hop; French pop; ethnic fusion
- Length: 74:14
- Label: Wati B; Sony Music; Jive; Epic
- Producer: Black M (also exec.); Barack Adama; Boaz van de Beatz; Diplo; Manu Dibango; Shakira; Dadju; Skalp; Supa Dups; Zaho; Dany Synthé; Elji Beatzkilla; FB Cool; Hcue; Jo A; Philip Meckseper; Nyadjiko; Renaud Rebillaud

Black M chronology
Les yeux plus gros que le monde (2015)	Éternel insatisfait (2016)	Il était une fois... (2019)

Singles from Éternel insatisfait
- 1. "A l'ouest" Released: 26 February 2016; 2. "Je suis chez moi" Released: 25 July 2016; 3. "#Askip" Released: 30 September 2016; 4. "Cheveux blancs" Released: 24 October 2016; 5. "Comme moi" Released: 31 March 2017

Éternel insatisfait (pronounced [etɛʁnɛl ɛ̃satisfɛ], English: Never Satisfied) is the second studio album by French-Guinean rapper and songwriter Black M. The album was released on October 28, 2016, by Wati B and Sony Music Entertainment. The album features collaborations with MHD, Soprano, Zaho, Alonzo, Gradur and Shakira.

== Track listing ==
No.	Title	Writer(s)	Producer(s)	Length
1.	"Je suis chez moi"	Alpha Diallo; Bastien Vincent	Black M; Renaud Rebillaud; Jo A	3:48
2.	"#Askip"	Diallo	Black M; Rebillaud	3:53
3.	"A l'ouest" (featuring MHD)	Diallo; Mohamed Sylla	Black M; Dany Synthé	4:21
4.	"Kirikou"	Diallo	Black M; Rebillaud	3:32
5.	"Cheveux blancs"	Diallo; Abou Debeing; Barack Adama	Black M; Rebillaud	3:25
6.	"Fais-moi rêver"	Diallo; Adama	Diplo; Philip Meckseper; Boaz van de Beatz	3:06
7.	"Frérot" (featuring Soprano)	Diallo; Saïd M'Roumbaba	Black M; Rebillaud	3:46
8.	"Mon défaut"	Diallo	Black M; FB Cool; Hcue	3:30
9.	"Beautiful"	Diallo; Debeing	Black M; Synthé; Dadju	3:36
10.	"Parle-moi" (featuring Zaho)	Diallo; Zehira Darabid	Black M; Synthé; Zaho	3:39
11.	"French kiss"	Diallo	Black M; Rebillaud	3:40
12.	"Wati by Black"	Diallo	Black M; Jo A; Skalp	3:33
13.	"Refait le monde"	Diallo	Black M; Synthé	4:04
14.	"Tout ce qu'il faut" (featuring Abou Debeing, Alonzo and Gradur)	Diallo; Kassim Djae; Wanani Mariadi; Debeing	Black M; FB Cool; Hcue	4:15
15.	"La route des princes"	Diallo; Adama; Nyadjiko	Black M; Adama; Nyadjiko	3:41
16.	"Comme moi" (with Shakira)	Diallo; Shakira Mebarak; Nasri Atweh	Black M; Shakira; Supa Dups; Synthé; Dadju	3:08
17.	"C'est quoi le Del"	Diallo; Adama; Karim Fall	Black M; Nyadjiko; Dadju	3:51
18.	"O.V.N.I."	Diallo	Black M; Elji Beatzkilla	4:30
19.	"Éternel insatisfait"	Diallo; Darabid; Vincent	Black M; Zaho; Jo A	3:28
20.	"Je suis chez moi" (African remix) (featuring Amadou & Mariam and Manu Dibango) (bonus track - all versions)	Diallo; Amadou Bagayoko; Mariam Doumbia; Adama; Vincent	Black M; Rebillaud; Manu Dibango; Jo A	3:28
Total length:				74:14

== Charts ==
=== Weekly charts ===
Chart (2016)	Peak position
Belgian Albums (Ultratop Flanders)	99
Belgian Albums (Ultratop Wallonia)	3
French Albums (SNEP)	2
Swiss Albums (Schweizer Hitparade)	18

=== Year-end charts ===
Chart (2016)	Position
Belgian Albums (Ultratop Wallonia)	50
French Albums (SNEP)	37

Chart (2017)	Position
Belgian Albums (Ultratop Wallonia)	60
French Albums (SNEP)	53

== Release history ==
Region	Date	Format(s)	Label(s)	Refs.
Worldwide	28 October 2016	CD; digital download	Jive Records; Epic Records	
Worldwide	28 October 2016	Streaming	Wati B; Sony Music Entertainment	
