= Il était une fois... (album) =

Studio album by Black M
- Released: September 13, 2019 (part 1)
- Recorded: 2018–2019
- Genre: Hip hop; R&B
- Label: Wati B

Black M chronology
Éternel insatisfait (2016)	Il était une fois... (2019)	Alpha (2021)

Singles from Il était une fois...
- 1. "Bon (Prologue)" Released: 3 June 2019; 2. "Mon beau-frère" Released: 13 June 2019; 3. "Dans mon délire" Released: 23 August 2019; 4. "Ainsi valse la vie" Released: 20 November 2019; 5. "Léa" Released: 26 February 2020

Il était une fois... (French pronunciation: [il etɛtyn fwa], lit. 'Once upon a time') is the third studio album by French rapper Black M, released on 13 September 2019. It consists of 17 tracks including 9 featurings with Bigflo & Oli, Heuss l'Enfoiré, Soolking, PLK, Koba LaD and Niro.

== Genesis ==
In September 2018, Black M announced on social networks that he was preparing his third album, which should be released in September 2019 and be accompanied by a tour. He released the first single from this future album on 3 June 2019 which is called Bon (Prologue). On 13 September 2019, three years after the release of his previous album, Black M released his third studio album, Il était une fois...

== Reception ==
=== Commercial reception ===
During its first week of operation, the disc sold only 5,600 copies, reaching 9,000 sales at the end of the third week. A disappointing performance for the artist in view of the sales of his previous albums. Despite good promotion and several appearances on television, the record was a real commercial failure.

== Track listing ==
No.	Title	Lyrics	Producer(s)	Length
1.	"Bon (Prologue)"	Black M	Black M, MKL	2:43
2.	"Mon beau-frère"	Black M	Black M, Vianney	3:33
3.	"Ainsi valse la vie"	Black M, Vianney, Maska	Black M, Vianney	3:23
4.	"Léa"	Black M, Maska	Black M, Barack Adama, DST The Danger, Unfazzed, Wladimir Pariente	2:10
5.	"Sale journée" (feat. Bigflo & Oli)	Black M, Bigflo, Oli, Abou Tall	Black M, MKL	3:46
6.	"Oh Mama"	Black M, Nazim	Black M, Bersa	3:04
7.	"Lucien"	Black M, Disiz La Peste, Maska	Black M, Jo A Touch	3:49
8.	"Monsieur l’agent" (feat. NAYLINZ)	Black M, NAYLINZ	Black M, MKL	3:06
9.	"No No No" (feat. PLK)	Black M, PLK, Barack Adama, Maska	Black M, DST The Danger, Wladimir Pariente	3:01
10.	"Pervers narcissique" (feat. Barbara Pravi)	Black M, Barbara Pravi, Maska	Black M, Nino Vella	4:05
11.	"Dans mon délire" (feat. Heuss l'Enfoiré and Soolking)	Black M, Heuss l'Enfoiré, Soolking, Barack Adama, Maska	Black M, FB Cool, DJ Hcue	3:32
12.	"Like"	Black M	Black M, MKL, Nyadjiko	3:50
13.	"Autour de moi" (feat. Koba LaD & Niro)	Black M, Koba LaD, Niro, Abou Tall	Black M, MKL, Abou Tall	4:25
14.	"Maître Yaya"	Black M, Barack Adama, Abou Tall	Black M, Kandia Kora, Nyadjiko	4:02
15.	"Maman j’arrive"	Black M, Vianney	Black M, Vianney, Nino Pella	4:51
16.	"Doutes (Épilogue)"	Black M, Barack Adama, Maska	Black M, Nino Pella, Wladimir Pariente	3:08
17.	"Bon [Remix]" (feat. Daks)	Black M, Daks, Barack Adama, Abou Tall	Black M, MKL	2:40
Total length:				59:08

== Charts ==
Chart (2016–18)	Peak position
Belgian Albums (Ultratop Flanders)	18
French Albums (SNEP)	2
