= Zombie (Gims song) =

Single by Gims

from the album Subliminal
- Released: December 2, 2013
- Genre: Pop rap
- Length: 3:12
- Label: Wati B
- Producer: Fux Cartel

Gims singles chronology
"You Lose" (2013)	"Zombie" (2013)	"Warano Style" (2013)

Music video
- "Zombie" on YouTube

"Zombie" is a song by Congolese singer and rapper Maître Gims from the reissue of the album Subliminal, released in December 2 2013. The song was written and composed by Maître Gims and Renaud Rebillaud.

== Charts ==
Chart (2013–14)	Peak Position
Belgium (Ultratop 50 Flanders)	39
Belgium (Ultratop 50 Wallonia)	11
France (SNEP)	3
Hungary (Single Top 40)	19
Switzerland (Schweizer Hitparade)	62
