= Mme Pavoshko =

Single by Black M

from the album Les Yeux plus gros que le monde
- Released: April 7, 2014
- Genre: French hip hop; comedy hip hop
- Length: 4:15
- Label: Wati B / Jive (Sony Music)
- Songwriter(s): Renaud Rebillaud, Black M

Black M singles chronology
| "Spectateur" (2014) | "Mme Pavoshko" (2014) | "Sur ma route" (2014) |

Music video
- "Mme Pavoshko" on YouTube

"Mme Pavoshko" is a song by Black M from his 2014 studio album Les Yeux plus gros que le monde. The song was also released as a single.

== Writing and composition ==
The song was written by Renaud Rebillaud and Black M.

== Track listing ==
Promo digital single (2014) – Wati B / Jive (Sony)

1. "Mme Pavoshko" (4:15)

== Charts ==
=== Weekly charts ===
| Chart (2014) | Peak position |
|---|---|
| Belgium (Ultratop Urban Flanders) | 26 |
| Belgium (Ultratop 50 Wallonia) | 15 |
| Belgium (Ultratop Airplay Wallonia) | 9 |
| Belgium (Ultratop Dance Wallonia) | 19 |
| France (SNEP) | 11 |

=== Year-end charts ===
| Chart (2014) | Position |
|---|---|
| Belgium (Ultratop Wallonia) | 67 |
