= Subliminal (album) =

Studio album by Maître Gims
- Released: 20 May 2013 (Standard Edition); 2 December 2013 (La face cachée)
- Recorded: 2012–2013
- Genre: Hip hop; urban pop; R&B
- Length: 69:05 (Standard Edition); 82:41 (La face cachée)
- Label: Wati B, MMC (Standard Edition); Wati B, Jive Records (La face cachée)

Maître Gims chronology
Ceux qui dorment les yeux ouverts (2006)	Subliminal (2013)	Mon cœur avait raison (2015)

Subliminal / La face cachée cover
- Alternative "La face cachée" cover

Singles from Subliminal
- 1. "Meurtre par strangulation" Released: 1 March 2013; 2. "J'me tire" Released: 15 March 2013; 3. "Bella" Released: 6 May 2013; 4. "One Shot" Released: 10 June 2013; 5. "Ça marche" Released: 5 August 2013; 6. "Changer" Released: 17 October 2013; 7. "You Lose" Released: 8 November 2013; 8. "Zombie" Released: 25 November 2013; 9. "Warano Style" Released: 27 November 2013

Subliminal (French pronunciation: [sybliminal]) is the debut solo album by Congolese-French singer and rapper Maître Gims. The 18-track album was released 20 May 2013 on Wati B and Monstre Marin Corporation, the latter founded by Maître Gims himself. The lyrics were all by Maître Gims whereas the music was by Maître Gims, Renaud Rebillaud and Stan-E Music. The album was a great success charting in France (reaching #2), Belgium (reaching #1) as well as charting in Switzerland.

On 2 December 2013, it was reissued and titled Subliminal / La face cachée (pronounced [la fas kaʃe], transl. The Dark Side), including 6 additional tracks for a total of 24 tracks. By 31 August 2015, the album had accumulated a total of more than 1,000,000 copies sold in France. In March 2021, "Bella" combined 488 million views.

== Genesis ==
In 2012, Maître Gims announced via social networks that he was preparing a comic strip entitled Au cœur du Vortex. Along with the design, Maître Gims is developing a concept textile brand: Vortex VX.

Although the announcement of a solo album by Maître Gims had been announced for a while, it was 29 January 2013, in the video Welcome to the Wa Part. 4: La Consécration, which he announced the release of his solo album Subliminal for 20 May 2013.

On 1 March 2013, Maître Gims broadcast "Meurtre par strangulation", an extract from his album accompanied by a clip. On 15 March he unveiled "J'me tire", the second extract. This track was the first single from the album and it was accompanied by a music video. He ranked number 1 in the Top 50 for four weeks starting 18 March 2013.

== Promotion ==
In 2012, Maître Gims announced through social network that he was preparing for an animated series titled Au cœur du Vortex and in conjunction was developing a clothing line to be named Vortex VX.

The greatly expected solo album was heavily promoted by Maître Gims in an announcement through his video "Welcome to the Wa Part. 4: La Consécration".

A series of consecutive releases of unpublished materials called Ceci n'est pas un Clip were released in anticipation:

- Ceci n'est pas un Clip I: Teaser of upcoming tracks
- Ceci n'est pas un Clip II: "Tapis dans l'Ombre"
- Ceci n'est pas un Clip III : "De Marseille à Paris" featuring Bedjik (his brother), Dr. Beriz, H Magnum & Soprano
- Ceci n'est pas un Clip IV: "Close Your Eyes" featuring JR O Chrome
- Ceci n'est pas un Clip V: "Sharingan" featuring 1solent, The Shin Sekaï and Orelsan
- Ceci n'est pas un clip VI: Bavon featuring Charly Bell

On 1 March 2013, Maître Gims also released "Meurtre par strangulation" (M.P.S.) as a first pre-release from the Subliminal album.

On 15 March 2013, just two weeks later, he released a second track from the album "J'me tire", that topped the SNEP official French Singles Chart.

== Reception ==
=== Commercial reception ===
Professional ratings
Review scores
Source	Rating
Music Story	3/5 stars

From its first week of operation, the album Subliminal is certified platinum: it sells 66,000 copies in actual album sales, but has however sold 100,000 copies including in-store sales. A month after its release, Subliminal sold 200,000 copies and was certified double platinum. Then, three months after its release, it was certified triple platinum with 300,000 sales. The album would end up being double diamond disc for over 1,000,000 in sales.

== Track list ==
No.	Title	Writer(s)	Producer(s)	Length
1.	"Intro"		Maître Gims; Renaud Rebillaud	2:50
2.	"Meurtre par strangulation"		Maître Gims; Renaud Rebillaud	4:24
3.	"J'me tire"		Maître Gims; Renaud Rebillaud	4:13
4.	"Freedom" (H-Magnum)		Maître Gims; Renaud Rebillaud	3:45
5.	"VQ2PQ"		Maître Gims; Renaud Rebillaud	3:42
6.	"Ça décoiffe" (Black M, JR O'Crom)		Maître Gims; Renaud Rebillaud	4:38
7.	"One Shot" (Dry)		Maître Gims; Renaud Rebillaud	3:27
8.	"Où est ton arme ?" (Maska)		Maître Gims; Renaud Rebillaud	4:28
9.	"Interlude"		Maître Gims; Renaud Rebillaud	1:41
10.	"La chute"		Maître Gims; Renaud Rebillaud	4:06
11.	"Ça marche" (The Shin Sekai)		Maître Gims; Renaud Rebillaud	3:43
12.	"Épuisé"		Maître Gims; Renaud Rebillaud	3:48
13.	"Laisse Tomber" (Dr. Beriz, Insolent)		Maître Gims; Renaud Rebillaud	4:27
14.	"À la base"		Maître Gims; Renaud Rebillaud	4:06
15.	"Pas touché" (Pitbull)		Maître Gims; Renaud Rebillaud	3:41
16.	"Outsider" (Bedjik, Dadju (The Shin Sekai), X-Gangs)		Maître Gims; Renaud Rebillaud	5:00
17.	"Bella"	Maître Gims	Maître Gims; Renaud Rebillaud	3:47
18.	"Changer"		Maître Gims; Renaud Rebillaud	3:32

=== Reissue ===
La face cachée
No.	Title	Producer(s)	Length
1.	"You Lose"	Maître Gims; Renaud Rebillaud	4:23
2.	"Zombie"	Maître Gims
3.	"De Marseille à Paris" (Bedjik, Dr. Beriz, Soprano, H-Magnum)	Maître Gims; Renaud Rebillaud	4:33
4.	"Close Your Eyes" (JR O Crom)	Maître Gims; Renaud Rebillaud	2:39
5.	"Monstre marin"	Maître Gims; Renaud Rebillaud	3:30
6.	"Warano Style"	Maître Gims; Renaud Rebillaud	4:25

== Charts ==
=== Weekly charts ===
Chart (2012–13)	Peak position
Belgian Albums (Ultratop Flanders)	47
Belgian Albums (Ultratop Wallonia)	1
French Albums (SNEP)	2
Swiss Albums (Schweizer Hitparade)	11

=== Year-end charts ===
Chart (2013)	Position
Belgian Albums (Ultratop Wallonia)	11
French Albums (SNEP)	3
Chart (2014)	Position
Belgium Albums (Ultratop Wallonia)	16
French Albums (SNEP)	10

== Certifications ==
Region	Certification	Certified units/sales
Belgium (BRMA)	Gold	15,000^{*}
France (SNEP)	Diamond	500,000^{*}
^{*} Sales figures based on certification alone.
