= MHD (album) =

Studio album by MHD
- Released: 15 April 2016
- Recorded: 2015–2016
- Genres: French hip-hop, Afrobeats, trap music, Afro-trap
- Labels: Artside, AZ, Capitol Records, Universal Records

MHD chronology
MHD (2016)	19 (2018)

Singles from MHD
- 1. "Afro Trap Part. 6 (Molo Molo)"; 2. "Roger Milla"; 3. "Maman j'ai mal"

MHD is the debut studio album by French rapper MHD, released on April 15, 2016, by Artside, AZ, Capitol and Universal. The 15-track album contains collaborations with Fally Ipupa and Angélique Kidjo.

== Track listing ==
1. "La Moula" – 3:27
2. "Afro Trap Part. 2 (Kakala Bomaye)" – 2:04
3. "Afro Trap, Part. 3 (Champions League)" – 2:17
4. "Afro Trap, Part. 4 (Fais le mouv)" – 2:35
5. "Mort ce soir" – 3:22
6. "A Kele N'ta" – 3:25
7. "Afro Trap Part. 5 (Ngatie Abedi)" –2:34
8. "Interlude Trap" – 2:13
9. "Amina" – 3:25
10. "Tout seul" – 3:07
11. "Afro Trap Part. 6 (Molo Molo)" – 2:20
12. "Ma vie" (featuring Fally Ipupa) – 3:07
13. "Roger Milla" – 3:20
14. "Maman j'ai mal" – 3:23
15. "Wanyinyin" (featuring Angélique Kidjo) – 3:26

== Charts ==
=== Weekly charts ===
Chart (2016)	Peak position
Belgian Albums (Ultratop Flanders)	170
Belgian Albums (Ultratop Wallonia)	12
Dutch Albums (Album Top 100)	20
French Albums (SNEP)	2
Swiss Albums (Schweizer Hitparade)	25

=== Year-end charts ===
Chart (2016)	Position
Belgian Albums (Ultratop Wallonia)	125
Dutch Albums (Album Top 100)	58
French Albums (SNEP)	23
Chart (2017)	Position
Dutch Albums (Album Top 100)	52
French Albums (SNEP)	74
