= MHD (rapper) =

French rapper (born 1994)

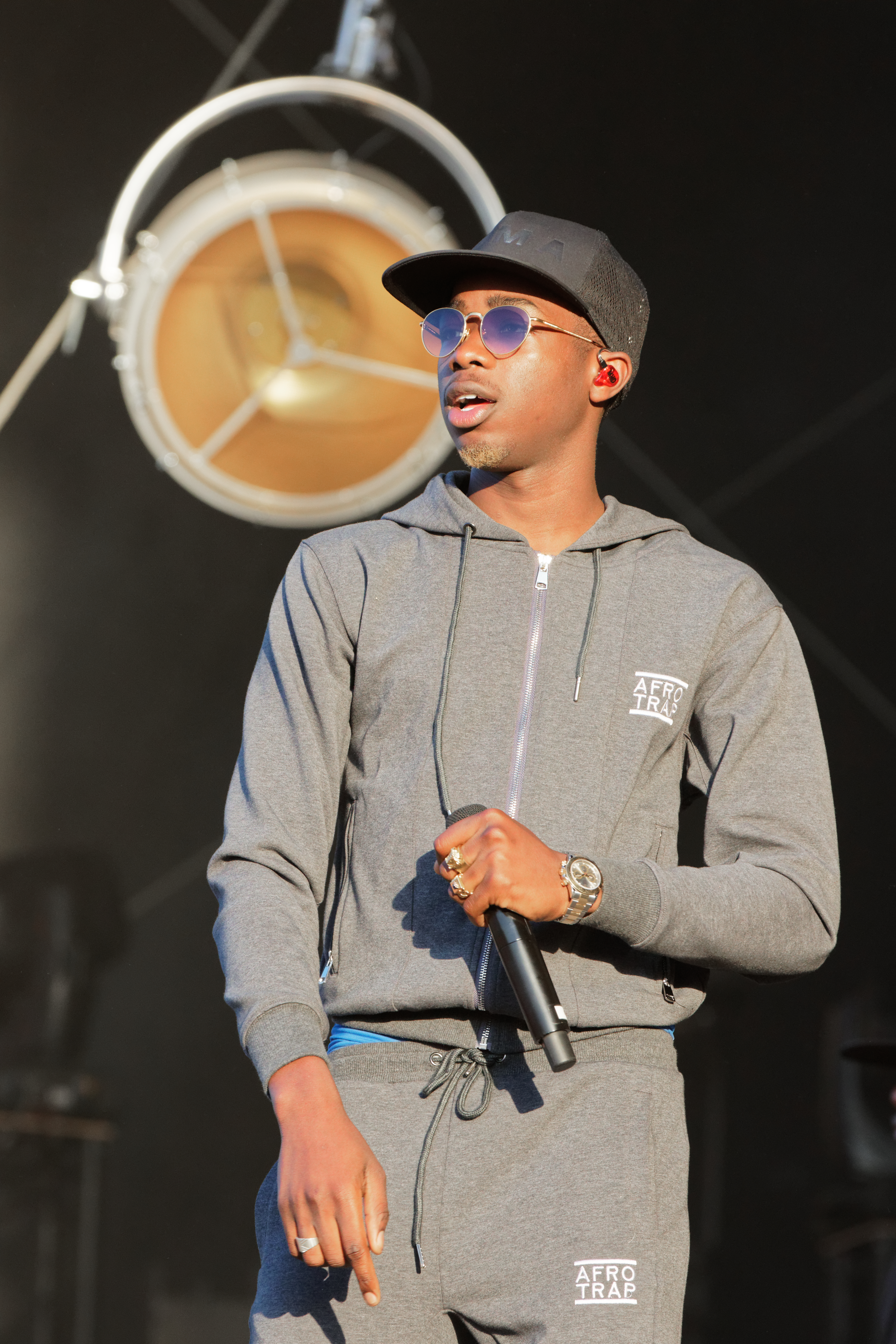
- MHD in 2017

Background information
- Born: Mohamed Sylla; 10 September 1994 (age 31); La Roche-sur-Yon, Vendée, France
- Genres: French hip-hop; trap; Afro trap
- Occupation: Rapper
- Years active: 2012–2018; 2021–present
- Website: mhdmusic.com

Mohamed Sylla (French pronunciation: [sila]; born 10 September 1994), better known by his stage name MHD, is a French rapper based in Paris, who is known for blending trap music with music of Africa; a genre he coined as "Afro Trap". He was previously part of the rap collective 1.9 Réseaux.

Born in Vendée to a family of West African extraction, MHD began his career as a rapper in Paris at the age of 18. He found success in the mid-2010s through material he published on social media (notably music videos on YouTube) and in 2016 released his debut album MHD, which sold more than 200,000 copies in 6 months. He later received international recognition, and toured in Guinea, England, Senegal and Morocco. His second album, titled 19, was released in September 2018, and he released his third album Mansa in July 2021.

In January 2019, MHD was arrested and charged with second-degree murder following investigation into the case of a young man who was beaten to death in the streets of Paris. He was remanded in custody for 18 months, and in 2023 was convicted of murder and sentenced to twelve years in prison. Claiming his innocence, he appealed the verdict and was released from prison in February 2024. The original sentencing was upheld in 2025.

== Early life ==
Mohamed Sylla was born in La Roche-sur-Yon (Vendée, France) of a Senegalese mother and a Guinean father; later in life, he moved to the 19th arrondissement of Paris. As a child, he and his family would often listen to music from Africa; he cites Papa Wemba, Koffi Olomide, Salif Keita and Awilo Longomba as influences. His cousin Gazo is also a rapper.

As an adult, before reaching fame, MHD was delivering pizza, then worked as a waiter in a luxury restaurant in the 6th arrondissement; MHD has since talked about this experience, and the casual racism he was subjected to by the patrons. After getting his BEP restauration (French foodservice qualification) he began considering a career in the catering industry.

== Career ==
=== 2012–2016: The rise of "Afro Trap" ===
In 2012, aged 18, Sylla a.k.a. "MHD" (a stage name derived from his first name Mohamed) joined 1.9 Réseaux, a rap collective in the 19th arrondissement. After years of spending time and money trying to make a breakthrough, he eventually quit the gangsta rap scene.

In August 2015, while on vacation, MHD posted a video on the Internet, of himself doing a freestyle over a song by Nigerian band P-Square. The video, which he said he did "just for fun", was received with success on social media, and the positive feedback inspired him to make a comeback into music. However, he had been disappointed with the world of French-language rap from his previous experience, judging there was too much influence from American trends. Taking from his parents' West African roots, he decided to provide diversity to the genre by adding cultural elements of this region into his music, such as musical genres, or singing verses in languages like Fula or Bambara. He coined this newfound genre as "Afro Trap".

Back from vacation, MHD began filming a music video for his freestyle song in his housing estate of the 19th arrondissement. Released in September 2015, the video, titled Afro Trap Part. 1 (La Moula) and featuring local youths dancing in the streets, garnered popularity on YouTube, prompting him to release more songs and videos. Afro Trap Part. 3 (Champions League), a song praising football club Paris Saint-Germain, is considered a breakthrough in MHD's music career, with the song and its dance moves becoming popular with supporters –and later, players– of the club. Soon, he was invited to perform opening acts for French rapper Booba, was featured in the soundtrack of the film Pattaya, and was invited to the Élysée –the French presidential palace– by then-President François Hollande on the occasion of a visit by Guinean President Alpha Condé.

=== 2016–2018: Studio career ===
His first studio album, named after his stage name, MHD, was released on 15 April 2016. It includes six parts of his Afro Trap series and songs featuring Fally Ipupa and Angélique Kidjo. The album sold more than 200,000 copies in less than six months, earning a double platinum certification in France.

He made successful tours in Europe and Africa, and became an ambassador for clothing brand Puma.

In September 2018, while preparing the release of his second studio album 19, MHD stated on social media that he had become disillusioned with the music industry and that he might retire after the release of the album. His second album, titled "19" (a reference to the 19th arrondissement where he used to live) was released on 19 September 2018, including collaborations with artists such as Salif Keita, Dadju, Orelsan and Nigerian pop star Wizkid; as of 2019, it sold more than 75,000 copies.

In 2018, MHD made his film debut starring in Mon frère (My Brother), a French drama directed by Julien Abraham. The film follows the story of Teddy (played by MHD) a young man who gets sent to a youth detention center after being accused of the murder of his abusive father. Mon frère was released in theaters in July 2019, while MHD was remanded in custody and charged with murder.

=== 2021-present: Return to music ===
In May 2021, MHD released Afro Trap Pt. 11 (King Kong), his first song since his release from detention. On 16 July 2021, he released his third album Mansa, including songs featuring artists Tiakola, Naira Marley and Adekunle Gold.

In September 2021, MHD collaborated with Argentine producer Bizarrap, and was featured in a music session.

== Legal issues ==
=== Criticism of police misconduct ===
In October 2018, MHD uploaded a video on social media in which two young men –one of which was described by MHD as his "big brother"– appeared to be victims of police misconduct. The video prompted investigation from the General Inspectorate of the National Police, or IGPN, the branch of the French police responsible for internal affairs. A spokesperson for the French police declared that the officers were responding to "threats" coming from the youths in the video.

=== Murder conviction ===
In January 2019, his name was cited in an investigation into a murder case, dating back to July 2018, when a 23-year-old man was beaten and stabbed to death in the streets of Paris by several youths, in the context of what has been reported as a fight between rival street gangs. Through images collected by surveillance cameras, French police found that assailants used a car owned by MHD; they later named MHD as a suspect himself. MHD was put on custody on 15 January 2019; two days later, he was indicted and charged with second-degree murder.

Following his arrest, some of his scheduled concerts were postponed indefinitely, while several fellow rappers, including Naza and Black M, voiced their support for MHD.

Investigators judged that he seemed to appear in the surveillance images, as well as his car, and he was also identified by several witnesses. Speaking through his lawyer, MHD denied any involvement in the crime, and during trial he would claim he was unaware of his car being used for criminal activities. His lawyer cited his lack of a judicial record, and added that she would appeal MHD being put on custody.

In March 2020, while MHD was remanded in custody in La Santé, his lawyer stated that he had tested positive for COVID-19 and subsequently requested for MHD to be released under supervision. The request was rejected.

In July 2020, after being detained on remand for 18 months, MHD was released under judicial supervision. A three-week trial occurred in September 2023, which resulted in his conviction on September 23 for murder, and a sentence of 12 years in prison. Five of his eight co-defendants were also convicted and given sentences ranging from 10 to 18 years, while the other three co-defendants were acquitted.

MHD, who has claimed his innocence since his arrest, appealed the verdict, and was released in February 2024 while pending the decision of the court of appeal. In February 2025, his original sentence was upheld.

== Discography ==
=== Studio albums ===
List of albums, with selected chart positions, sales and certifications
Title	Album details	Peak chart positions					Certifications
Title	Album details	FRA	BEL (Fl)	BEL (Wa)	NLD	SWI	Certifications
MHD	Released: 15 April 2016; Label: Artside, AZ, Capitol, Universal; Format: Digital download	2	170	12	20	25	SNEP: 2× Platinum
19	Released: 19 September 2018; Label: Artside; Format: Digital download	3	42	7	11	10	SNEP: Platinum
Mansa	Released: 15 July 2021; Label: Universal; Format: Digital download	3	72	7	84	19	

=== Extended plays ===
Title	EP details
Afro Trap (Mad Decent Remixes) (with Mad Decent)	Released: 2 February 2018; Label: Artside; Format: Digital download

=== Singles ===
List of singles as lead artist, with selected chart positions
Title	Year	Peak chart positions							Certifications	Album
Title	Year	FRA	ARG	BEL (Wa)	MENA	NLD	SPA	SWI	Certifications	Album
"Afro Trap Pt.2 (Kakala Bomaye)"	2016	181	—	—	*	—	—	—	SNEP: Gold	MHD
"Afro Trap Pt.3 (Champions League)"	2016	19	—	49	*	—	—	—	SNEP: Diamond	MHD
"Afro Trap Pt.4 (Fais le mouv)"	2016	108	—	—	*	—	—	—	SNEP: Gold	MHD
"Afro Trap Pt.5 (Ngatie Abedi)"	2016	32	—	—	*	—	—	—	SNEP: Platinum	MHD
"Afro Trap Pt.6 (Molo Molo)"	2016	53	—	—	*	—	—	—	SNEP: Gold	MHD
"A kele nta"	2016	15	—	—	*	—	—	—	SNEP: Diamond	MHD
"Afro Trap Pt.7 (La puissance)"	2016	9	—	—	*	75	—	78	SNEP: Diamond	MHD
"Afro Trap Pt.8 (Never)"	2017	2	—	50	*	74	—	42	SNEP: Platinum	Non-album single
"Bravo"	2017	19	—	—	*	—	—	82		19
"Afro Trap Pt.9 (Faut Les Wet)"	2017	44	—	—	*	—	—	—		Non-album single
"Afro Trap Pt.10 (Moula Gang)"	2018	36	—	—	*	73	—	87		19
"Bénéfice" (with Ninho)	2018	84	—	—	*	—	—	—		Non-album singles
"Bodyguard"	2018	55	—	—	*	—	—	—		Non-album singles
"Bella" (feat. Wizkid)	2018	4	—	38	*	—	—	57	SNEP: Diamond	19
"Intro Mansa" (feat. Salif Keita)	2018	—	—	—	*	—	—	—		19
"Afro Trap, Part. 11 (King Kong)"	2021	4	—	35	*	—	—	29		Mansa
"Pololo" (feat. Tiakola)	2021	15	—	—	*	—	—	81		Mansa
"MHD: Bzrp Music Sessions, Vol. 44" (with Bizarrap)	2021	—	43	—	*	—	45	—		Non-album singles
"In Da Car" (with NSG)	2022	—	—	—	—	—	—	—		Non-album singles
"Tek Tek" (with Dystinct)	2023	12	—	34	19	15	—	47		Non-album singles
"—" denotes a recording that did not chart or was not released in that territory. "*" denotes the chart did not exist at that time.

=== Other charting songs ===
List of other charting songs, with selected chart positions
Title	Year	Peak chart positions		Album
Title	Year	FRA	SWI	Album
"Roger Milla"	2016	71	—	MHD
"Amina"	2016	122	—	MHD
"La Moula"	2016	138	—	MHD
"Maman J'ai mal"	2016	50	—	MHD
"Tout Seul"	2016	177	—	MHD
"Ma Vie"	2016	145	—	MHD
"Bébé" (featuring Dadju)	2018	6	83	19
"XIX"	2018	17	—	19
"Encore"	2018	41	—	19
"Le temps" (featuring Orelsan)	2018	58	—	19
"Papalé"	2018	59	—	19
"Oh la la"	2018	70	—	19
"Rouler"	2018	74	—	19
"Fuego"	2018	102	—	19
"Feeling"	2018	104	—	19
"Senseless Ting" (featuring Stefflon Don)	2018	128	—	19
"Interlude Trap 2"	2018	135	—	19
"Aleo" (featuring Yemi Alade)	2018	145	—	19
"Samedi dimanche"	2018	194	—	19
"Moussa"	2018	195	—	19
"Petit cœur"	2021	112	—	Mansa
"Sagacité"	2021	149	—	Mansa
"Beyoncé"	2021	157	—	Mansa
"Elle"	2021	165	—	Mansa
"9min"	2021	171	—	Mansa
"Tudo bem"	2021	186	—	Mansa

=== Featured in ===
Year	Title	Peak chart positions	Album
Year	Title	FRA	Album
2016	"À l'ouest" (Black M feat. MHD)	—	Éternel insatisfait
2016	"Laissez-les kouma" (Zaho feat. MHD)	30	Le monde à l’envers
2016	"Oblah" (Gradur feat. Alonzo, MHD & Nyda)	19	Where Is l'album de Gradur
2017	"Fais le mouv" (Sofiane feat. MHD)	186	#JeSuisPasséChezSo
2017	"Feu d'artifice" (Alonzo feat. MHD)	31	100%
2017	"Na lingui yé" (Fally Ipupa feat. MHD)	119	Tokooos
2017	"Problèmes" (Aya Nakamura feat. MHD)	135	Journal intime
2017	"Versus" (Niska feat. MHD)	9	Commando
2018	"Bénéfice" (Ninho X MHD)	84	Game over
2018	"Appelez la police" (Maître Gims feat. MHD)	96	Ceinture noire
2018	"Ariva" (Sadek feat. MHD)	163	Johnny de Janeiro
2021	"Carabine" (Da Uzi feat. MHD)	160	Vrai 2 vrai
2021	"Christian Dior" (Leto feat. MHD)	42	17%
2021	"Blackcard" (Tayc feat. Franglish & MHD)	—	Fleur froide
2021	"Appelez-les" (Imen Es feat. MHD)	—	ES
2021	"Gros bonnets" (Koba LaD feat. MHD)	—	Cartel Vol. 1 & 2
2022	"Nicky" (Chily feat. MHD)	—	Van Bommel de Chily
2022	"Gaga" (Joé Dwèt Filé feat. MHD)	—	Non-album single
"—" denotes a recording that did not chart or was not released in that territory.

== Music videos ==
List of music videos as lead artist, showing directors
Title	Year	Director(s)
"Afrotrap Pt.2 (Kakala Bomaye)"	2015	Kyoh Productions
"Afrotrap Pt.3 (Champions League)"	2015	420Workshop
"Afrotrap Pt.4 (Fais le mouv)"	2015	420Workshop
"Afrotrap Pt.5 (Ngatie Abedi)"	2016	Kyoh Productions
"Afrotrap Pt.6 (Molo)"	2016	Kyoh Productions
"Roger Milla"	2016	William Thomas
"Maman j'ai mal"	2016	William Thomas
"A kele nta"	2016	Ken & Ryu
"Afrotrap Pt.7 (La Puissance)"	2016	Pierre-Marie Paubel
"Afrotrap Pt.8 (Never)"	2017	Ju Kahlo
"Bravo"	2017	Julien Kaddour
"Afrotrap Pt.9 (Faut les wet)"	2017	420 Workshop
"Afrotrap Pt.10 (Moula Gang)"	2018	Frédéric de Pontcharra
"Bodyguard"	2018	420 Workshop
"Bella" (feat. WizKid)	2018	KLVDR
"XIX"	2018	Ojoz
"Pololo" (feat. Tiakola)	2021	Ojoz

== Filmography ==
- Mon frère (2019) by Julien Abraham – as Teddy
