= J'me tire =

Single by Maître Gims

from the album Subliminal
- Released: 15 March 2013
- Recorded: 2012
- Label: Wati B; Jive
- Songwriters: Renaud Rebillaud; Meti Fantomm; Maître Gims

Music video
- "J'me tire" on YouTube

"J'me tire" (pronounced [ʒmə tiʁ], English: I'm leaving) is the debut solo single by Congolese rapper and singer Maître Gims, a former member of the band Sexion d'Assaut. It was released on 15 March 2013 as the first single from his debut album Subliminal.

The single was successful, becoming Maître Gims' first number 1 on the French SNEP Singles Chart. It also topped the Belgian Wallonia chart, charted in Belgium's Flanders Chart, in the Netherlands, and in Switzerland.

The music video was directed by Adam Nael and filmed in various desert and snowy mountainous settings. The mountain scenes were shot at Haute-Savoie.

== Charts ==
=== Weekly charts ===
Weekly chart performance for "J'me tire"
Chart (2013)	Peak position
Belgium (Ultratop 50 Flanders)	4
Belgium (Ultratop 50 Wallonia)	1
France (SNEP)	1
Netherlands (Dutch Top 40)	7
Netherlands (Single Top 100)	5
Switzerland (Schweizer Hitparade)	17

=== Year-end charts ===
Year-end chart performance for "J'me tire"
Chart (2013)	Position
Belgium (Ultratop Flanders)	18
Belgium (Ultratop Wallonia)	10
France (SNEP)	9
Netherlands (Single Top 100)	36
Switzerland (Schweizer Hitparade)	62

== Certifications ==
Certifications for "J'me tire"
Region	Certification	Certified units/sales
Belgium (BRMA)	Platinum	30,000^{*}
France (SNEP)	Platinum	150,000^{*}
Switzerland (IFPI Switzerland)	Gold	15,000^{^}
^{*} Sales figures based on certification alone.^{^} Shipments figures based on certification alone.
