= L'Institut =

French hip hop collective

- Origin: Paris, France
- Genres: Collective of various Hip hop, rap, urban genres
- Years active: 2005-2014
- Labels: Wati B
- Past members: Abou Debeing; Dr. Beriz; Dadif; L'Insolent; Le H de Guerre; John.K; L.A.S

L'Institut is a French hip hop collective, established in 2005 as an offshoot of Sexion d'Assaut, and associated with Wati B. L'institut was formed by various rap and hip hop / freestyle acts mostly coming from 9th arrondissement in Paris. L'Institut released the collective album Equipe de nuit in June 2013 that included in addition various collaborations with L.I.O. Pétrodollars, S.Pri Noir and Shin Sekaï. The group was dissolved in 2014, despite encouraging initial success with various band members concentrating on solo projects and collaborations.

Members of the collective notably Dr. Beriz, Insolent and Abou Debeing have also had many separate releases, collaborations and chart success in their own right.

== Members ==
Abou Debeing and Docteur Beriz (sometimes Docteur Berize, Dr. Beriz) are two prominent founding members of L'Institut.

Although there were a number of changes, other main acts associated to L'Institut were Dadif, L'Insolent, Le H de Guerre, John Kafé and L.A.S

=== Dr. Beriz ===
Dr Bériz or Docteur Bériz (born 1 April 1990) is the artistic name of Mourtada Alladji Coulibaly grew up in the 9e arrondissement in Paris. He was signed to the Wati B label. After leaving the label, he released "Acquitté" in preparation for a new album in 2019.

== Discography ==
=== Albums ===
Year
Album
Peak positions
Notes
FR

2013
Équipe de nuit
47

No.	Title	Length
1.	"Parigos"	4:06
2.	"Millions de kilomètres"	5:10
3.	"Fuseau horaire" (L.I.O. Pétrodollars)	3:51
4.	"GI Joe"	3:17
5.	"Invités par la street" (S-pri Noir)	4:25
6.	"Trahis"	5:19
7.	"Tout là-haut"	4:07
8.	"Pas de deuxième chance"	3:25
9.	"Dirty"	4:31
10.	"Différent" (feat. Shin Sekaï)	4:27
11.	"Nuits blanches"	3:01
12.	"Ville fantôme" (feat. Sexion d'Assaut)	3:24

== Discography (members) ==
=== Abou Debeing ===
Albums

Year	Album	Peak positions	
Year	Album	FRA	BEL (Wa)
2017	Debeinguerie	58	188
2019	Street Love	37	–

Charting songs

Year	Album	Peak positions
Year	Album	FRA
2015	"Adios" (feat. Black M)	167
2016	"Sorry" (feat. Aya Nakamura)	188
2017	"C'est pas bon" (feat. Dadju)	58
2018	"Mes défauts" (feat. Imen Es)	133

Featured in

Year	Album	Peak positions
Year	Album	FRA
2014	"Billet facile" (Shin Sekaï - Dry - Abou Debeing - Docteur Beriz)	153
2014	"Tout le monde me connaït" (Black M feat. Abou de Being & Stan E)	188
2016	"Je te vois" (Still Fresh feat. Abou Debeing)	172
2016	"Tout ce qu'il faut " (Black M feat. Abou Debeing, Alonzo & Gradur)	146

=== Dr. Beriz ===
Albums

Year	Album	Peak positions
Year	Album	FRA
2016	1974	77

Featured in

Year	Album	Peak positions
Year	Album	FRA
2013	"Laisse tomber" (Maître Gims feat. Dr. Beriz & Insolent (L'Institut))	200
2013	"On fait pas semblant" (Dry feat. Docteur Berize (L'Institut))	161
2013	"De Marseille à Paris" (Maître Gims feat. Bedjik - Dr. Beriz - H Magnum - Soprano)	58
2014	"La légende black" (Black M feat. Dr Berize)	8
2014	"Billet facile" (Shin Sekaï - Dry - Abou Debeing - Docteur Beriz)	153
2014	"Profiter de ma life" (Maska feat. Black M & Dr. Beriz)	62
2015	"Polygame" (Lartiste feat. Dr. Beriz)	196
