= Black M =

French rapper, singer and songwriter

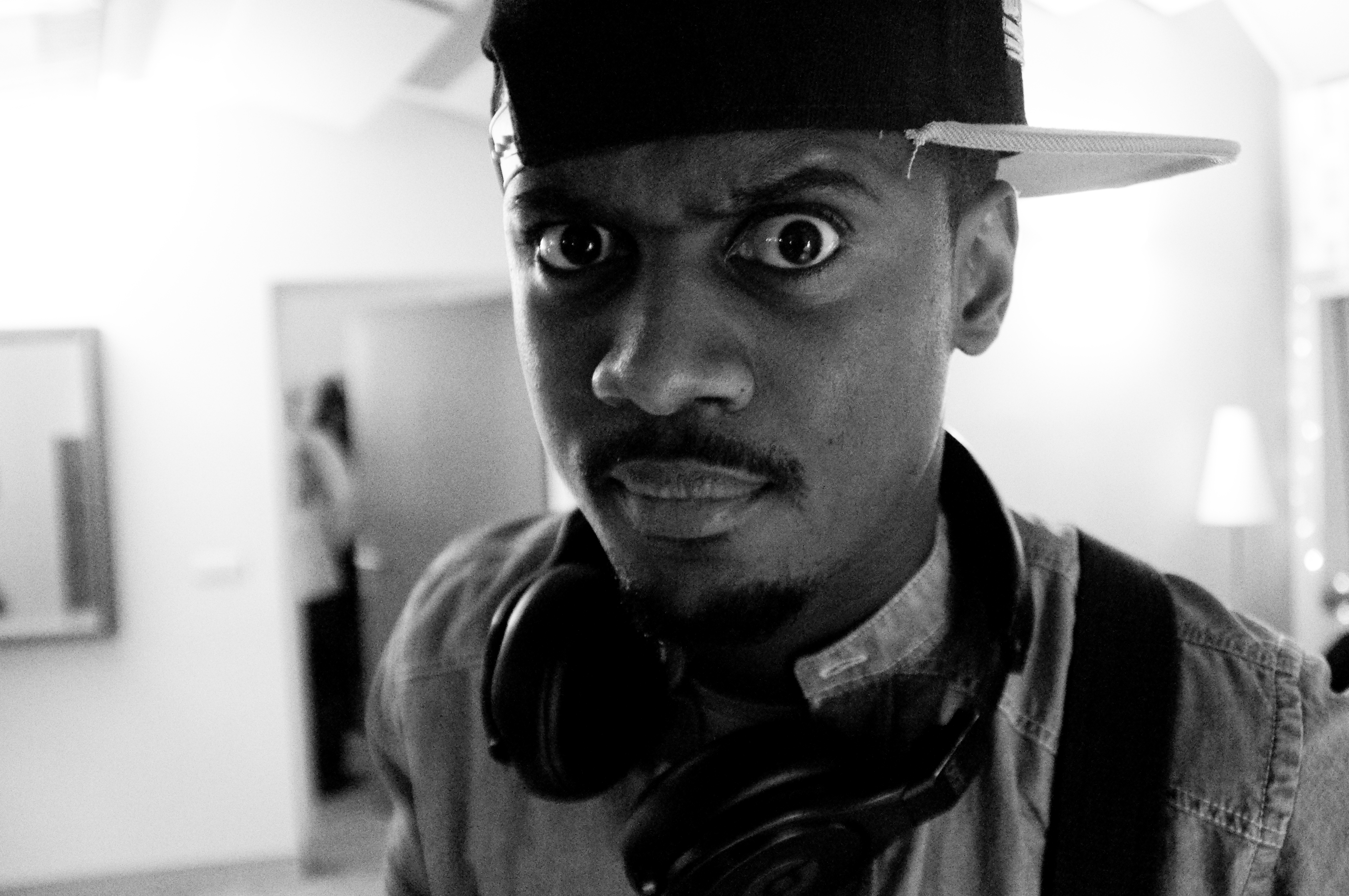
- Black M in 2012

Background information
- Also known as: Black Mesrimes, Big Black
- Born: Alpha Diallo; 27 December 1984 (age 41); Paris, France
- Genres: Hip hop; R&B
- Occupations: Rapper; singer; songwriter
- Years active: 2002–present
- Label: PIAS Recordings

Alpha Diallo (born 27 December 1984), better known by his stage name Black M (originally Black Mesrimes), is a French rapper, singer, songwriter and member of the Sexion d'Assaut group.

In 2014, he released his first solo album, entitled Les yeux plus gros que le monde, which shortly after was certified diamond. It was due to this album that Black M was launched into the French scene.

== Early life ==
Alpha Diallo's parents are of Guinean origin, precisely from the Donghol-Sigon region in Fouta Djalon. He grew up in the 13th arrondissement of Paris, a district in which he still lives today, coming from a modest family.

== Career ==
=== Sexion d'Assaut (2002–2012) ===
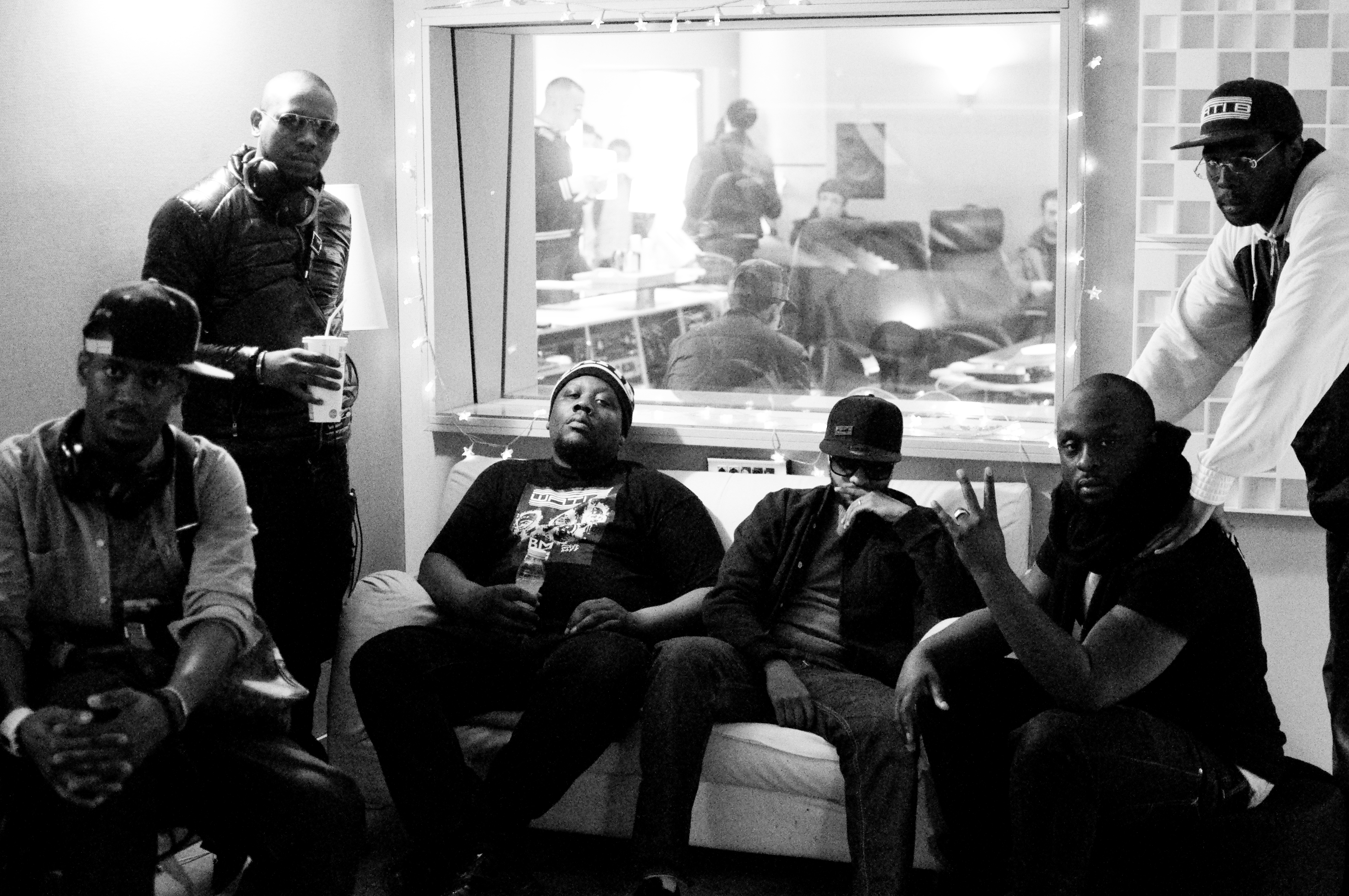
Black M (far left) With La Sexion d'Assaut in 2012.

The pseudonym Black Mesrimes is a play on words, a contraction between the name of the former public enemy number one, Jacques Mesrine, and the words “rhymes” and “black” evoking his skin color. Since 2020, he is mainly referred to as Black M. During his appearances in Sexion d'Assaut music videos, he uses certain facial expressions, such as making big eyes, an expression he made on the cover of his first album. He is considered one of the more technical members of Sexion d'Assaut, along with Gims and Lefa.

With the group Sexion d'Assaut, Black M released two studio albums: L'École des points vitaux (2010) and L'Apogée (2012), two mixtapes: Les Chroniques du 75 (2009) and En attendant L'Apogée: les Chroniques du 75 (2011), two street albums: Le Renouveau (2008) and L'Écrasement de tête (2009), a mixtape: La Terre Du Milieu (2006), a reissue (2012), a live album: L'Apogée à Bercy (2012), three DVDs and a compilation: Best Of (2013).

=== Les yeux plus gros que le monde (2013–2014) ===
On 31 March 2014, Black M released his first solo album entitled Les yeux plus gros que le monde, relatively well received by the specialized press, sold 530,000 copies in December 2002 and certified diamond disc. In May 2014, his single "Sur ma route" ranked number 1 in sales in France and was certified platinum.

On 8 September he released the music video for another single with Dr Beriz, "La légende Black". Black M announces the re-release of its first album under the name Le Monde plus gros que mes yeux (initially scheduled for release on 17 November 2014), the first single of which is "Je garde le sourire". At the same time, Black M is investing in other projects. He thus participates in the soundtrack of the film The New Adventures of Aladdin featuring Kev Adams, or on the compilation Touche pas à ma zik by Tefa and Cyril Hanouna.

=== Éternel Insatisfait (2015–2018) ===
At the end of 2014, Black M announced the preparation of his second solo album, titled Éternel insatisfait. In 2016, he joined the troupe Les Enfoirés. On 28 October 2016, the album was released, followed by a tour, the “Éternel Big Black Tour”, which took place between April and December 2017. On 29 September 2017, he released the title "Death Note" and, a week more late, "Dress Code". These two extracts are found in the reissue of Éternel insatisfait, released on 17 November 2017.

In November 2017, he announced that he was embarking on cinema with an autobiography which should begin filming at the beginning of 2018. On 18 April 2018, he did a private concert for one of his biggest fans of his initials "C.L", it was the best birthday present this old lady could have had!

=== Il était une fois... (2019–2020) ===
In September 2018, Black M announced on social networks that he was preparing his third album, which would be released in September 2019 and accompanied by a tour. He released the first single from this future album, titled Bon (Prologue), on 3 June 2019. On 13 September 2019, three years after the release of his previous album, Black M released his third studio album, Il était une fois....

During its first week of operation, the disc sold only 5,600 copies, reaching 9,000 sales at the end of the third week. A disappointing performance for the artist in light of the sales of his previous albums. Despite good promotion and several appearances on television, the record was a real commercial failure.

=== Alpha... (since 2020) ===
At the end of 2019, Black M announced the return of Sexion d'Assaut for 2020, with both a major tour and another album promised to follow.

On the 27th of December 2020, the day of his birthday, Black M insulted, among others, Gims and Kev Adams, shocking fans on Twitter where the insults were published. He also criticized Sexion d'Assaut, whose return was planned with a concert the same year. It was later found that he was posting these posts as "Black Shady", his hateful alter ego, to announce his return. On the same day he released the song "Black Shady Pt. 4", accompanied by a clip, which followed "Black Shady Pt. 1 and 2", published as solo songs on the Sexion d'Assaut albums and "Black Shady Pt.3", published on his first album Les yeux plus gros que le monde in 2014. At the end of the clip, he announced the release of an Extended play, Alpha, for March 2021. The release was then postponed until 21 May 2021. In the meantime, he released other extracts from his album, such as "N.S.E.G." and "À la tienne".

Black M has been regularly featured in the educational song competition, "Manie Musicale" and won in 2017 with his song, "Sur ma route" and in 2018 with, “Je suis chez moi”.

== Personal life ==
Since 2009, Black M has been married to Léa Djadja, image consultant and professional makeup artist, whom he met on the set of the first "Wati bon son" clip of Sexion d'Assaut. Together they have a son, Isaac, who was born on 13 March 2012. On 28 July 2020, the couple announced that they were expecting their second child. Léa gave birth to a daughter on 20 September 2020.

== Controversies ==
=== Homophobia accusation ===
The Sexion d'Assaut group, of which Black M is a part, was accused in 2010 of homophobia, which led to bans on the air by Fun Radio and NRJ, as well as requests for the cancellation of concerts and its participation in 2010 MTV Europe Music Awards. On the song "On t'a humilié", Gims of Sexion d'Assaut rapped, "I believe it is high time that queers perish. Cut off their penises, leave them dead, found on the ring road".

=== Cover of "Dans ma rue" ===
Black M was accused of anti-Semitism by the Belgian League Against Anti-Semitism (LBCA), which called for a boycott by Belgian radios of his cover of "Dans ma rue" by Doc Gynéco, because of the use of the word "youpin", a word considered a "racist insult to designate the Jew".

=== Centenary of the Battle of Verdun ===
In May 2016, Black M was invited to sing at the celebration of the centenary of the Battle of Verdun (300,000 dead, 400,000 wounded) by the socialist municipality, but he was the subject of criticism for the indecency of the arrival of this rapper at the commemoration of this historic battle, leading to demands for the cancellation of the concert first on the part of the right, the National Rally and other personalities. He was criticized for lyrics to songs from Sexion d'Assaut anti-French ("conne de France", "moi aussi je baiserai la France" in 2010, and "ce pays de kouffar"), or homophobic ("il est grand temps que les pédés périssent”in 2006), even if for the latter, the LGBT community centre considered the controversy closed in 2011 after Sexion d'Assaut amended by collaborating with associations fighting against homophobia. The conservative newspaper Le Figaro questioned the very relevance of a festive event of any kind to commemorate the death of 300,000 people. On 9 May 2016, the rapper invited his detractors to come and see him: "Whether they like my music or not: we're going to have fun". The President of the Republic, François Hollande declared on 17 May 2016: "This initiative was after the ceremony, so that young people can have a festive moment".

The town hall canceled the concert on the grounds of the risk of disturbing public order following the controversy and a "surge of hatred and racism", the mayor having been physically threatened by appeals and considering himself let down by the government. The Secretary of State for Veterans Affairs, Jean-Marc Todeschini, declared on television that the cancellation of the Black M concert was "a first step towards totalitarianism, towards fascism". In reaction, Black M evoked his grandfather, a Senegalese Tirailleur, who fought during the Second World War and deplored the “hate speech” he received. He expressed his pride in participating in a concert linked to the commemoration of the Battle of Verdun. According to Libération, on 21 May 2016, Lamarana Amadou, president of the Association of the Children of Senegalese Riflemen in Guinea confirmed that Alpha Diallo (the true identity of Black M) is the grandson of the ex-combattant Alfa Mamoudou Diallo “fighter of the Second World War”. Le Monde then published a document which concerns a 1st class soldier named Alfa Diallo who served well in the 14th Senegalese infantry regiment and was repatriated to the free zone after being captured by the German army.

Black M responded to this controversy a few months later by unveiling his new single "Je suis chez moi".

== Discography ==
=== Solo ===
Studio albums

- Les yeux plus gros que le monde (2014)
- Éternel insatisfait (2016)
- Il était une fois... (2019)
- Alpha... (2021)
- La Légend Black (2023)

Live albums

- Les yeux plus gros que l'Olympia (2015)

EPs

- Le pacte (2005)

== Awards ==
Year	Nominee / work	Award	Result	Ref
2014	"Sur ma route"	Trace Urban Music Awards (Best Music Video of the Year)	Won	
2014	"Mme Pavoshko"	NRJ Music Awards (Best Music Video of the Year)	Won	
2015	Himself	Talents W9 Award (Special public price 8–14 years old)	Won	
2015	Himself	MTV Europe Music Awards (Best French Act)	Won	
2016	Himself	Kids Choice Awards (Favorite French Musical Artist)	Won	
