= Charles Leclerc =

Monégasque racing driver (born 1997)

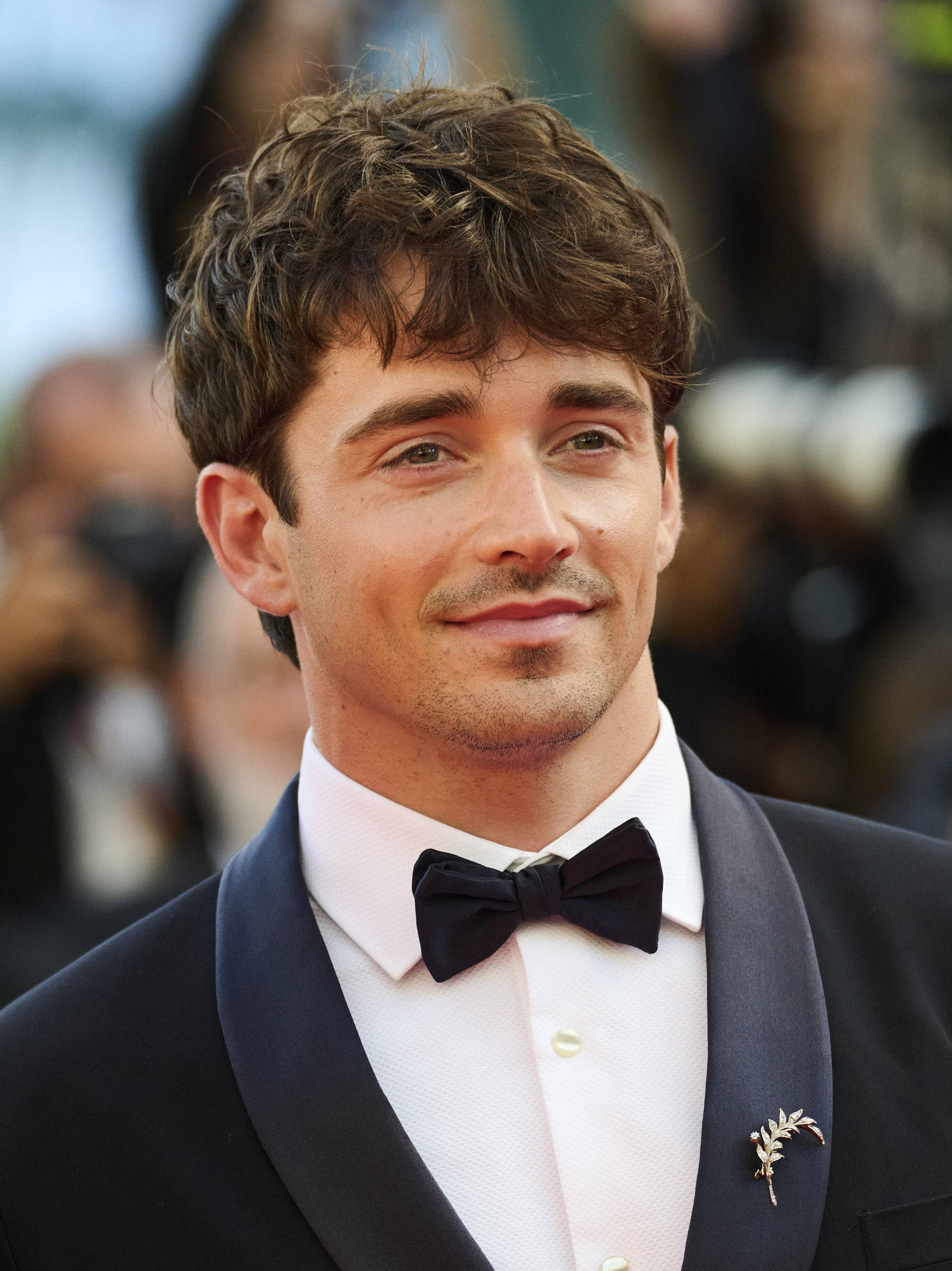
- Leclerc in 2026
- Born: Charles Marc Hervé Perceval Leclerc; 16 October 1997 (age 29); Monte Carlo, Monaco
- Spouse: Alexandra Saint Mleux (m. 2026)
- Children: 1
- Father: Hervé Leclerc
- Relatives: Arthur Leclerc (brother)
- Awards: Full list

Formula One World Championship career
- Nationality: (Monaco) Monégasque
- 2026 team: Ferrari
- Car number: 16
- Entries: 193 (191 starts)
- Championships: 0
- Wins: 9
- Podiums: 56
- Career points: 1921
- Pole positions: 27
- Fastest laps: 15
- First entry: 2018 Australian Grand Prix
- First win: 2019 Belgian Grand Prix
- Last win: 2026 British Grand Prix
- Last entry: 2026 São Paulo Grand Prix
- 2025 position: 5th (242 pts)

Previous series
- 2017; 2016; 2015; 2014; 2014: FIA Formula 2; GP3 Series; FIA F3 European; Formula Renault Eurocup; Formula Renault 2.0 Alps

Championship titles
- 2017; 2016: FIA Formula 2; GP3 Series
- Website: charlesleclerc.com

Signature
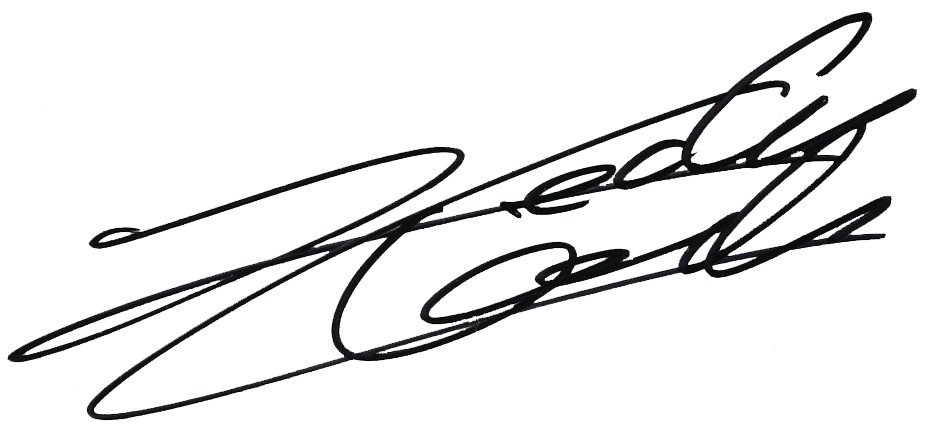

Charles Marc Hervé Perceval Leclerc (French pronunciation: [ʃaʁl(ə) ləklɛʁ]; (Note: In this French name, the final consonants in the forename and surname are silent: SHARL la-CLER.) born 16 October 1997) is a Monégasque racing driver who competes in Formula One for Ferrari. Leclerc was runner-up in the Formula One World Drivers' Championship in 2022 with Ferrari, and has won nine Grands Prix across nine seasons.

Born and raised in Monte Carlo, Leclerc began competitive kart racing aged seven. After a successful karting career—culminating in his victory at the junior World Cup in 2011—Leclerc graduated to junior formulae. Progressing directly to Formula Renault 2.0, he finished runner-up to Nyck de Vries in the Alps Series and achieved several podium finishes in the Eurocup. Leclerc graduated to FIA European Formula 3 in 2015, winning several races as he finished fourth in his rookie season. He won his first championship at the 2016 GP3 Series with ART. Leclerc then won the inaugural FIA Formula 2 Championship in 2017 with Prema, becoming the fourth driver to win the GP2/F2 championship in their rookie season and breaking several records. (Note: Including most wins in a season (7, shared with Stoffel Vandoorne and George Russell), most pole positions in a season (8), most consecutive pole positions (6), and then-youngest champion (19 years, 356 days).)

Leclerc made his Formula One debut in 2018 with Sauber as part of the Ferrari Driver Academy, scoring several points finishes in the C37. He joined Ferrari for 2019 to partner Sebastian Vettel and became the second-youngest polesitter in Formula One history at the Bahrain Grand Prix; he took his maiden career win in Belgium, before ending Ferrari's record nine-year drought at the Italian Grand Prix, which saw him nicknamed "il Predestinato" in Italian media. (Note: lit. 'the Predestined') After winless seasons for Ferrari in 2020 and 2021, Leclerc took several victories and finished runner-up to Max Verstappen in the 2022 World Drivers' Championship. Following five pole positions and six podiums in his 2023 campaign, Leclerc won the Monaco Grand Prix in 2024, becoming the first Monégasque driver to win the race in 93 years; he achieved further victories in Italy and the United States as he finished third in the championship. Partnered by Lewis Hamilton from 2025 onwards, he returned to victory in Britain following new regulations in 2026.

As of the 2026 São Paulo Grand Prix, Leclerc has achieved nine race wins, 15 fastest laps, and 56 podiums in Formula One; he also holds the record for the most pole positions without a World Drivers' Championship (27). Leclerc is contracted to remain at Ferrari until at least the end of the 2028 season. Outside of motor racing, Leclerc collaborated with pianist Sofiane Pamart on an extended play, Dreamers (2024), which peaked at number two on the Billboard Classical Albums chart.

== Early life ==
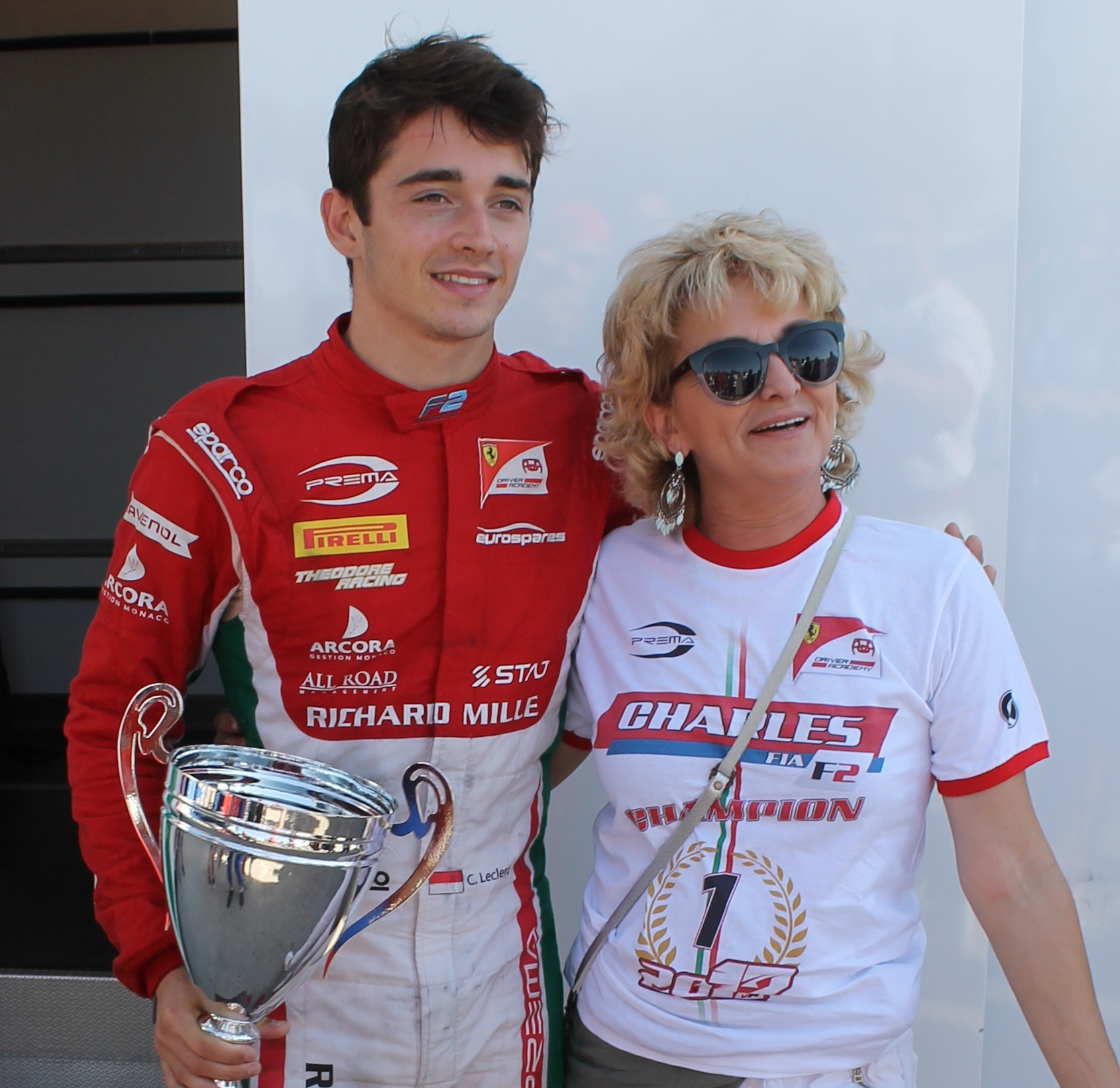
Leclerc with his mother, Pascale, after winning the 2017 FIA Formula 2 Championship

Charles Marc Hervé Perceval Leclerc was born on 16 October 1997 in Monte Carlo, Monaco. His father, Hervé Leclerc, was a racing driver who competed in Formula Three in the 1980s, whilst his mother, Pascale, is a former hairdresser who operated a hair salon in Fontvieille. His paternal step-grandfather founded the Novares Group, a French manufacturing company; he helped cover miscellaneous costs throughout Leclerc's karting career, but not the racing itself. Leclerc studied at the Lycée Albert Premier in Monaco-Ville.

Hervé died after a long illness, aged 54, four days before Leclerc won the feature race at the 2017 Baku Formula 2 round. Prior to his death, Leclerc lied to his father that he had signed a Formula One contract for the 2018 season; he signed with Sauber later that year. His older maternal half-brother, Lorenzo Tolotta-Leclerc, was his mechanic in kart racing, and best friends with Jules Bianchi, Leclerc's godfather. His younger brother, Arthur, is also a racing driver who has competed in open-wheel and sportscar racing, winning the Formula Regional Asian Championship in 2022.

== Junior racing career ==
=== Karting (2005–2013) ===
==== 2005–2009: Early success in national championships ====
Leclerc first began karting aged five and started racing at Brignoles—a kart circuit owned by Jules Bianchi's father. He began his competitive career in 2005, winning the regional PACA championship in the Mini class with 15 wins from 18 races, which he successfully defended in 2006. He advanced to Minime in 2007, winning the Trophée Claude Secq and finishing runner-up at the PACA championship. The following year, he finished fifth in the Bridgestone Cup and runner-up in the French Championship, as well as winning the PACA title. Progressing to the Cadet class in 2009, Leclerc won the French Championship and Bridgestone Cup, as well as the regional Rhône-Alpes title. He partnered with Richard Mille that year, which supported him through the remainder of his karting career.

==== 2010–2011: Progression to international series ====
Leclerc progressed to international competition in 2010, entering the junior KF3 class, where he became the youngest winner of the CIK-FIA Monaco Kart Cup—his home event at the Circuit de Monaco. He finished twenty-ninth on his World Cup debut, fifth in the inaugural Academy Trophy, and runner-up to Pierre Gasly in the French Championship. Leclerc was scouted by Nicolas Todt in 2011, joining his All Road Management firm upon recommendation from Bianchi. Todt negotiated his move to Intrepid that year, winning the World Cup at Sarno; he later described it as "by far [his] best karting race ever". He further won the Academy Trophy and the Masters of Paris-Bercy, as well as finishing runner-up to Nicklas Nielsen in the WSK Final Cup.

==== 2012–2013: Senior titles with ART ====
Leclerc graduated to the senior KF2 category in 2012 with the factory-backed ART Grand Prix team, winning the WSK Euro Series; he was involved in an incident with Max Verstappen at the second round, which resulted in both drivers' disqualifications. He finished runner-up on his European Championship debut amidst a title battle with Verstappen and Ben Barnicoat, repeating this result at the under-18 World Championship, where he lost by a single point. He achieved fifth-placed finishes in both the World Cup and WSK Final Cup, and fourth at the SKUSA SuperNationals.

In 2013, Leclerc progressed to the KZ senior gearbox class, aged 15. He opened the season with victory at the South Garda Winter Cup in KZ2. He finished twelfth in the WSK Euro Series, and fourth in the WSK Master Series. Leclerc finished sixth in the European Championship after claiming a podium in the final round at Genk. In a duel to become the youngest-ever KZ World Champion, he finished runner-up to Verstappen at Varennes-sur-Allier. Upon his graduation to junior formulae, Leclerc credited their "numerous clashes" with boosting his experience and character. Kartcom opined that "his rise [was] meteoric for a driver who [did not] spend much time training on the track".

=== Formula Renault 2.0 (2014) ===
Leclerc graduated to junior formulae in 2014, signing for Fortec in Formula Renault 2.0, aged 16. He debuted in the Alps Series, retiring from both races in the opening round at Imola. He achieved his maiden podium finish in the second race at Pau. After fourth-placed finishes at the Red Bull Ring, Leclerc scored a double podium during the Spa-Francorchamps round. He followed this up with his maiden formula racing victories at Monza, the latter from pole position. He finished second to Nyck de Vries in both Mugello races before claiming points finishes at the season-ending Jerez round. During the season, Leclerc took two victories from seven podium finishes as he finished runner-up to De Vries—a third-year Formula Renault 2.0 driver—and beat Matevos Isaakyan to the rookies' championship.

Fortec also entered Leclerc into select rounds of the Eurocup, part of the World Series by Renault, as a guest driver. He set a track record at Barcelona-Catalunya in pre-season testing. After finishing outside of the points on debut at Spa-Francorchamps, Leclerc took his maiden podium in the series at the Nürburgring, finishing second to Dennis Olsen. He then took further second-placed finishes in both races at the Hungaroring, ending his campaign with three podiums from six starts.

=== Formula Three (2015) ===
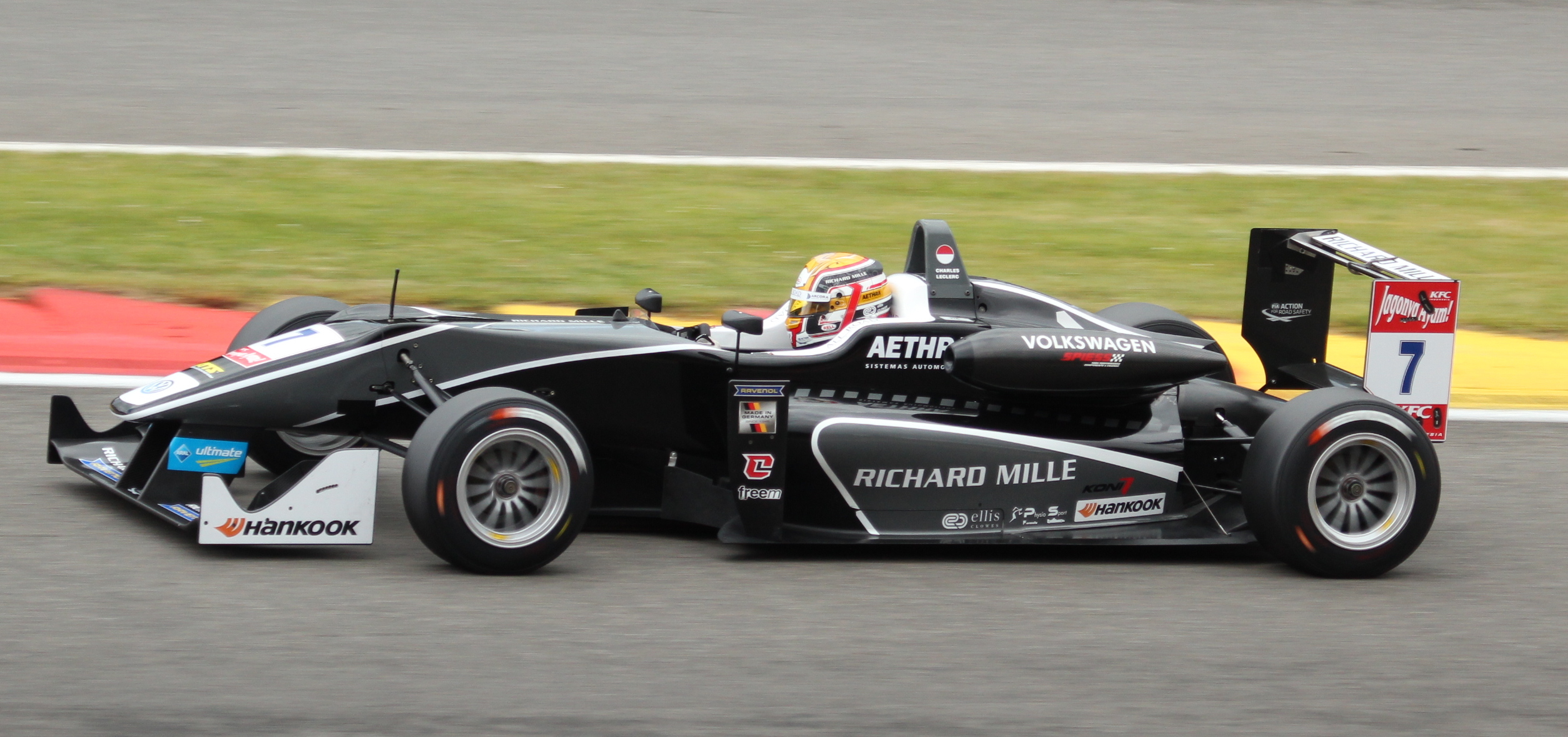
Leclerc progressed to FIA European Formula 3 in 2015, winning several races and finishing second at the Macau Grand Prix.

Leclerc graduated to Formula Three in 2015, contesting FIA European F3 with Van Amersfoort Racing amongst a highly-competitive field. In the opening round at Silverstone, he inherited pole position for the second and third races after Felix Rosenqvist was excluded for a technical infringement. After finishing twelfth on debut, he clinched second in race two followed by his maiden victory amidst a race-long battle with Antonio Giovinazzi. Leclerc claimed an additional three consecutive podiums at the Hockenheimring, winning the rain-affected third race after overtaking Rosenqvist. He increased his run to eight consecutive podiums at Pau, including a third-placed finish at the Pau Grand Prix—the final race of the weekend. He suffered his first retirement of the season in the second race at Monza after colliding with Jake Dennis, before returning to the podium in the curtailed final race. With his victory in the first race at Spa-Francorchamps from sixth on the grid—following a three-way battle with Rosenqvist and Giovinazzi—Leclerc took the championship lead; he achieved a further podium in race three.

With a victory from pole followed by another podium at the Norisring, Leclerc held a 42.5-point lead over Giovinazzi after six rounds. Leclerc collided with Lance Stroll in race two at Zandvoort and had to replace his Dallara F314 chassis. From that point onwards, Leclerc did not score a single podium across the remaining four rounds, with fourth-placed finishes at the Red Bull Ring and Nürburgring, as he slipped to fourth in the standings—behind Rosenqvist, Giovinazzi, and Dennis. He clinched the rookies' championship, having achieved four victories from 13 podium finishes, and Valentin Khorounzhiy of Motorsport.com ranked him the best driver of the season. Following his European F3 campaign, Leclerc entered the Macau Grand Prix with Van Amersfoort. After qualifying third, Leclerc finished second to Felix Rosenqvist in the qualification race after a penalty for Antonio Giovinazzi, which set the grid for the main race. Leclerc again finished second to Rosenqvist in the Grand Prix, following a race-long battle. After the race, he described the result as crucial to his "mental strength" following a challenging end to his F3 season.

=== GP3 Series (2016) ===
In December 2015, Leclerc partook in post-season GP3 testing with ART and Arden, ultimately signing with the former for the 2016 GP3 Series. He additionally joined the Ferrari Driver Academy prior to the season. Leclerc qualified third at Catalunya before winning his debut race by over six seconds; in the reverse-grid second race, (Note: In the 2016 GP3 Series, grid position for race two was decided by race one finishing position, with the top eight finishers subjected to a reverse-grid.) he finished ninth. At the Red Bull Ring, he took pole position by over half a second and led the first race from lights-to-flag. He retired after colliding with Jake Dennis and Tatiana Calderón in race two, receiving a five-place grid penalty. Subsequently starting seventh at Silverstone, Leclerc recovered to second- and third-placed finishes. After finishing sixth in race one at the Hungaroring, he achieved a podium in race two as race-winner Alexander Albon took the championship lead. He received a three-place grid drop for impeding Giuliano Alesi in qualifying at the Hockenheimring, where he finished fifth in race one—behind Albon. His third-placed finish in race two, coupled with Albon's retirement, saw Leclerc reclaim his points lead.

Leclerc took pole at Spa-Francorchamps and held off Dennis to win race one, before finishing sixth in the second race. Another pole followed at Monza, where he finished fourth in race one—ahead of title rivals Albon and Antonio Fuoco—and retired from race two after colliding with teammate Nirei Fukuzumi. Leclerc took his third consecutive pole at Sepang, finishing third and fifth in the races, which extended his championship lead to 29 points over Albon with one round remaining. Leclerc clinched the title in race one at Yas Marina after Albon retired, with Leclerc suffering race-ending damage himself after colliding with Santino Ferrucci, and dedicated the title to his godfather Jules Bianchi. With three victories from eight podiums, Leclerc described the season as "amazing" and that it was the first time in his junior formulae career he felt pressure: "now I can handle the pressure".

=== FIA Formula 2 (2017) ===
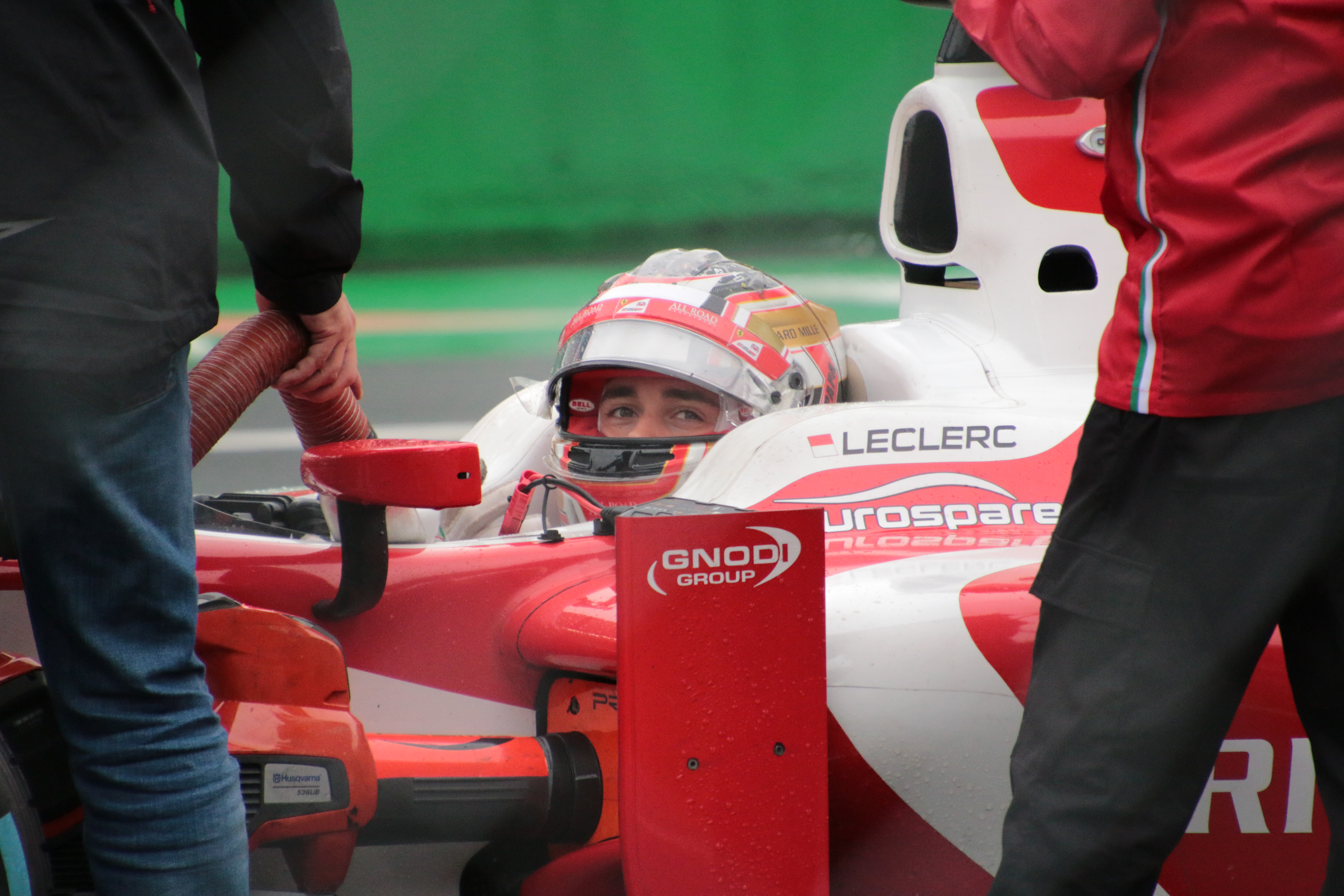
Leclerc (pictured at Monza) graduated to FIA Formula 2 with Prema in 2017.

Following his GP3 title victory, Leclerc progressed to FIA Formula 2 with Prema for its inaugural 2017 season, alongside fellow Ferrari Driver Academy member Antonio Fuoco. Debuting at Sakhir, Leclerc took pole position for the feature race, where he finished third. In the reverse-grid sprint race, (Note: In the 2017 FIA Formula 2 Championship, sprint race grid position was decided by feature race finishing position, with the top eight finishers subjected to a reverse-grid.) he opted for a mid-race pit stop—an uncommon practise in sprints—after creating a nine-second lead; Leclerc proceeded to overtake 13 drivers in nine laps to secure his maiden F2 victory. He took pole again in Barcelona, holding off Luca Ghiotto to win his first feature amidst a radio issue, before finishing fourth in the sprint. Leclerc retired from both races at his home round in Monte Carlo after qualifying on pole, suffering suspension failure in the feature and collision damage with Norman Nato in the sprint. Whilst retaining his championship lead, he described the weekend as "hugely disappointing". Leclerc dedicated his pole in Baku to his recently deceased father, Hervé; he converted it to victory in the feature and second-place in the sprint, losing the win to Nato at the latter following a 10-second time penalty for ignoring yellow flags. He won the Spielberg feature from pole, holding off teammate Fuoco and the DAMS of Nicholas Latifi. Leclerc collided with the former in the sprint, reducing his championship lead over Oliver Rowland to 49 points midway through the season.

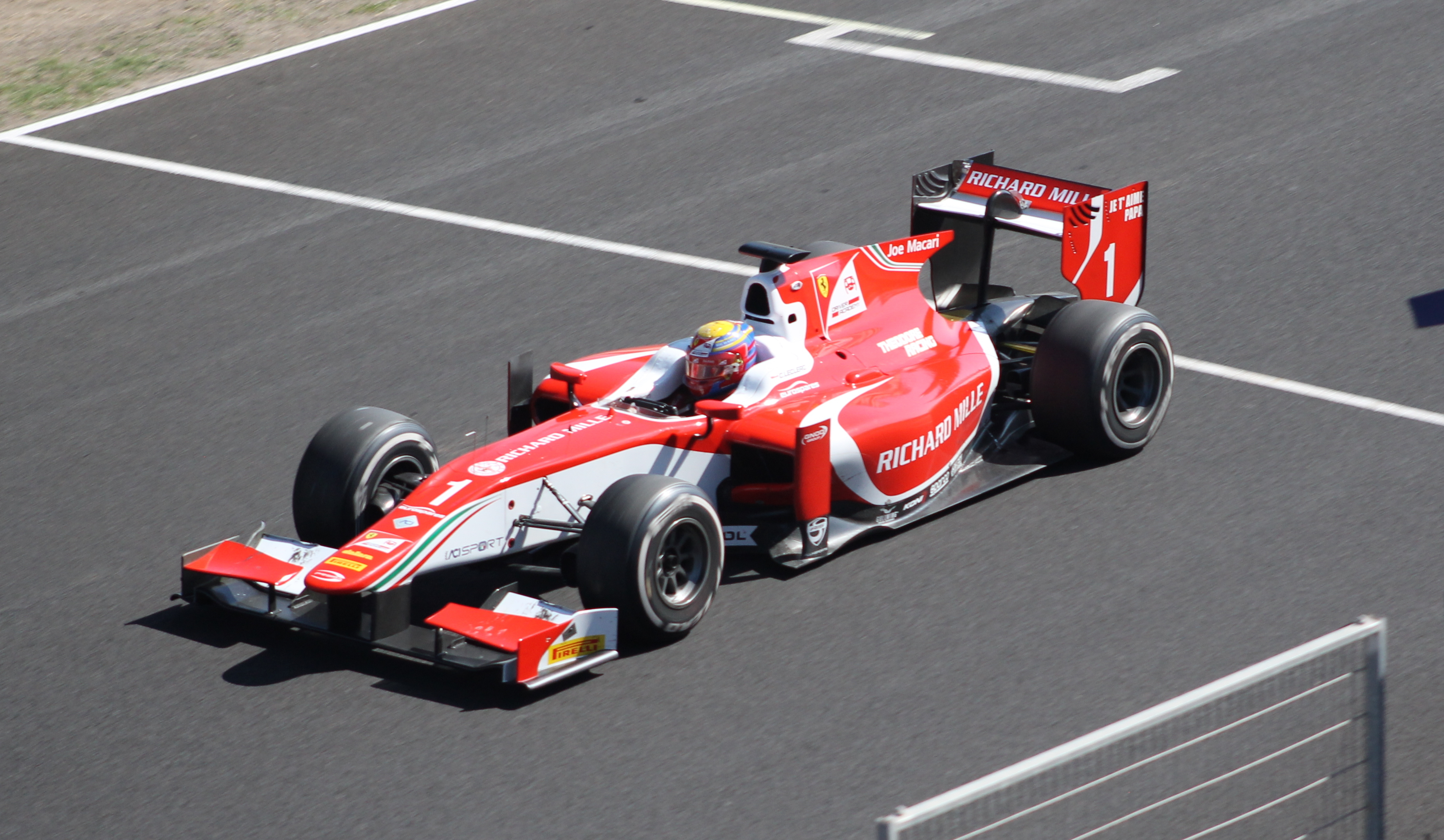
Leclerc dominated F2 in his rookie season, taking a joint-record seven victories and clinching the championship in Jerez, aged 19.

Leclerc achieved a record-equalling sixth consecutive pole at Silverstone, (Note: Stoffel Vandoorne previously achieved six consecutive pole positions from 2014 Spa-Francorchamps to 2015 Catalunya, when the championship operated as the GP2 Series.) winning the feature amidst multiple reliability issues, including brake and exhaust fires. He was disqualified from pole in Budapest for a technical infringement, finishing fourth in the feature and sprint after starting the former in last-place, albeit behind title rival Rowland in both. Leclerc returned to pole at Spa-Francorchamps but was disqualified from his 25-second winning margin in the feature due to excessive skid block wear. Leclerc recovered to fifth after starting nineteenth in the sprint. Whilst battling for the lead of the Monza feature with Nyck de Vries, the pair collided on the final lap following a late-race safety car, condemning both drivers to finish outside the points. With a 59-point margin over Rowland heading into the penultimate round at Jerez, Leclerc required pole position and victory to clinch the title in the feature; after achieving his eighth pole of the season, he held off a late charge by Rowland to become the then-youngest GP2/Formula 2 champion—aged 19 years, 356 days—as well as the third rookie champion after Lewis Hamilton, Nico Rosberg, and Nico Hülkenberg. At the season-ending Yas Island round, Leclerc inherited second-place in the feature after disqualifications for Rowland and teammate Fuoco. Starting seventh for the sprint, he overtook Alexander Albon on the final lap to secure his record-equalling seventh victory of the season. Leclerc was named FIA Rookie of the Year for his efforts in 2017, achieving seven wins from 10 podiums and eight pole positions, finishing 72 points ahead of eventual runner-up Artem Markelov.

== Formula One career ==
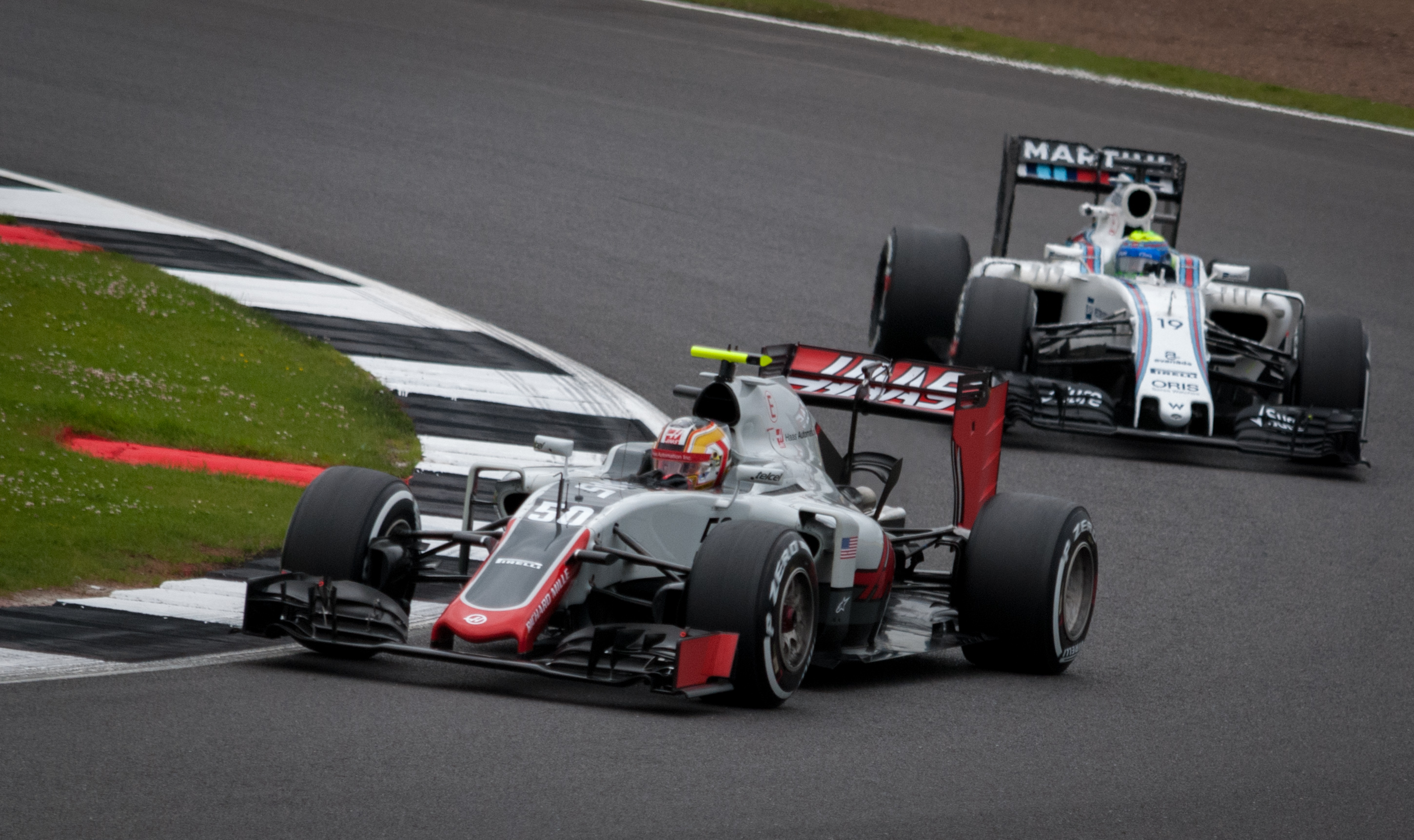
Leclerc (left) joined the Ferrari Driver Academy in 2016, completing four free practice sessions with Haas.

In 2016, Leclerc joined the Ferrari Driver Academy and signed as a development driver for Haas and Ferrari. He made his testing debut at Fiorano two months later, driving the Ferrari F14 T. As part of his role at Haas, Leclerc participated in the first free practice sessions of the British, Hungarian, German, and Brazilian Grands Prix. After impressing Ferrari at the former, he completed his first official test for the team at Silverstone in the SF16-H. He was initially rumoured to graduate directly to Formula One with Haas after winning the 2016 GP3 Series; team principal Guenther Steiner denied the rumours and stated that Leclerc would instead progress to FIA Formula 2.

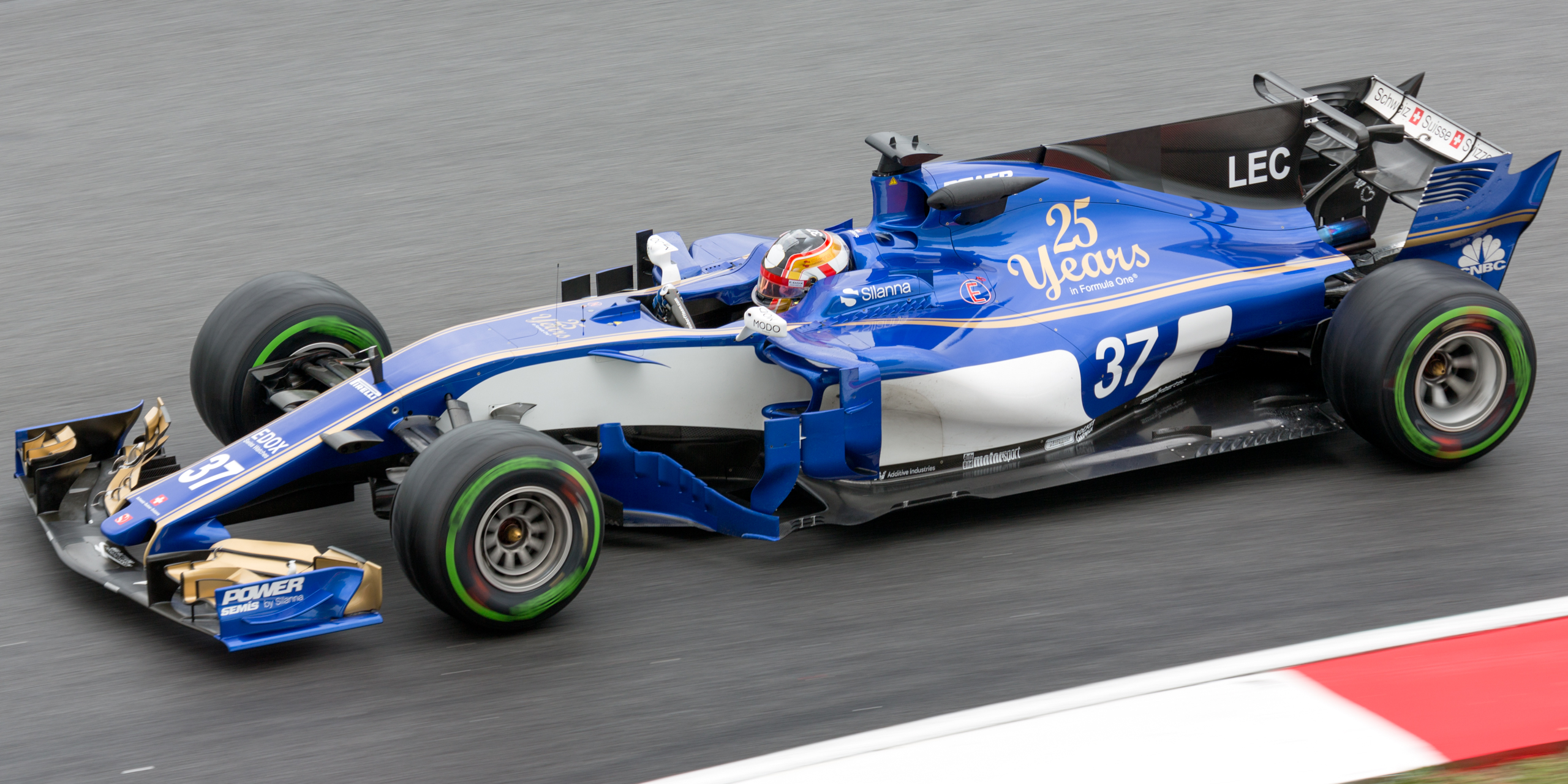
Leclerc completed four sessions with Sauber in 2017, as well as the mid-season test with Ferrari.

Leclerc took part in the 2017 mid-season test at the Hungaroring with Ferrari—driving the SF70H—completing 98 laps and setting the fastest lap of the first day. Kimi Räikkönen praised his performance, stating "it's not easy to do well in a different car from what you normally drive", adding that "for sure he will do great things in the future". Leclerc completed further free practice sessions with Sauber at the Malaysian, United States, Mexican, and Brazilian Grands Prix.

=== Sauber (2018) ===
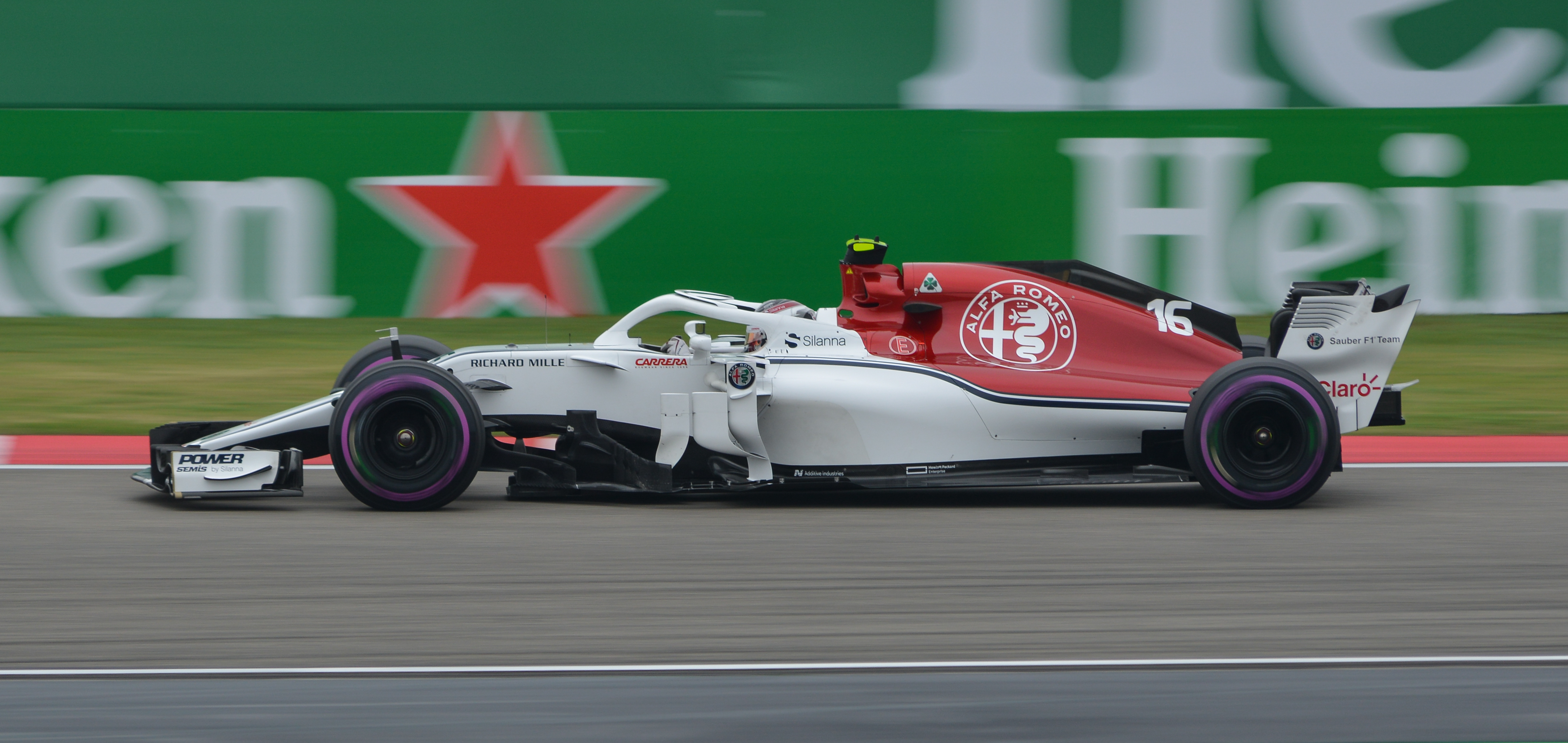
Leclerc (pictured at the Chinese Grand Prix) debuted in Formula One with Sauber in 2018.

Leclerc signed for Sauber in 2018 as a full-time driver, replacing Pascal Wehrlein to partner Marcus Ericsson. With his debut at the Australian Grand Prix, Leclerc became the first Monégasque driver to compete in Formula One since Olivier Beretta in 1994. (Note: Beretta was the last Monégasque national to compete in Formula One; Dutch driver Robert Doornbos competed under a Monégasque licence in 2005.) He qualified eighteenth and finished thirteenth on debut. After non-scoring finishes in Bahrain and China, a sixth-placed finish at the Azerbaijan Grand Prix saw him become the first Monégasque driver to score points in Formula One since Louis Chiron in 1950. He scored another point by finishing tenth at the Spanish Grand Prix. At his first home Grand Prix in Monaco, Leclerc suffered a brake failure in the closing laps, colliding with the diffuser of Brendon Hartley into the Nouvelle Chicane and forcing his first career retirement. Three consecutive points finishes followed in Canada, France, and Austria, before going five races without points. This run included three retirements: a loose wheel in Britain, suspension damage after colliding with Esteban Ocon and Sergio Pérez in Hungary, and a multi-car collision in Belgium. Leclerc credited the halo device with saving him from severe injury during the latter, stating that he "was very happy to have it over [his] head". Further points finishes came with ninth- and seventh-place at the Singapore and Russian Grands Prix, respectively, before retirements from a mechanical failure in Japan and damage from a collision with Romain Grosjean in the United States. Leclerc closed his rookie season with three consecutive seventh-placed finishes in Mexico, Brazil, and Abu Dhabi. Leclerc finished thirteenth in the World Drivers' Championship, with 39 points to teammate Ericsson's nine, and was again named FIA Rookie of the Year.

=== Ferrari (2019–present) ===
==== 2019: Maiden victories and il Predestinato ====
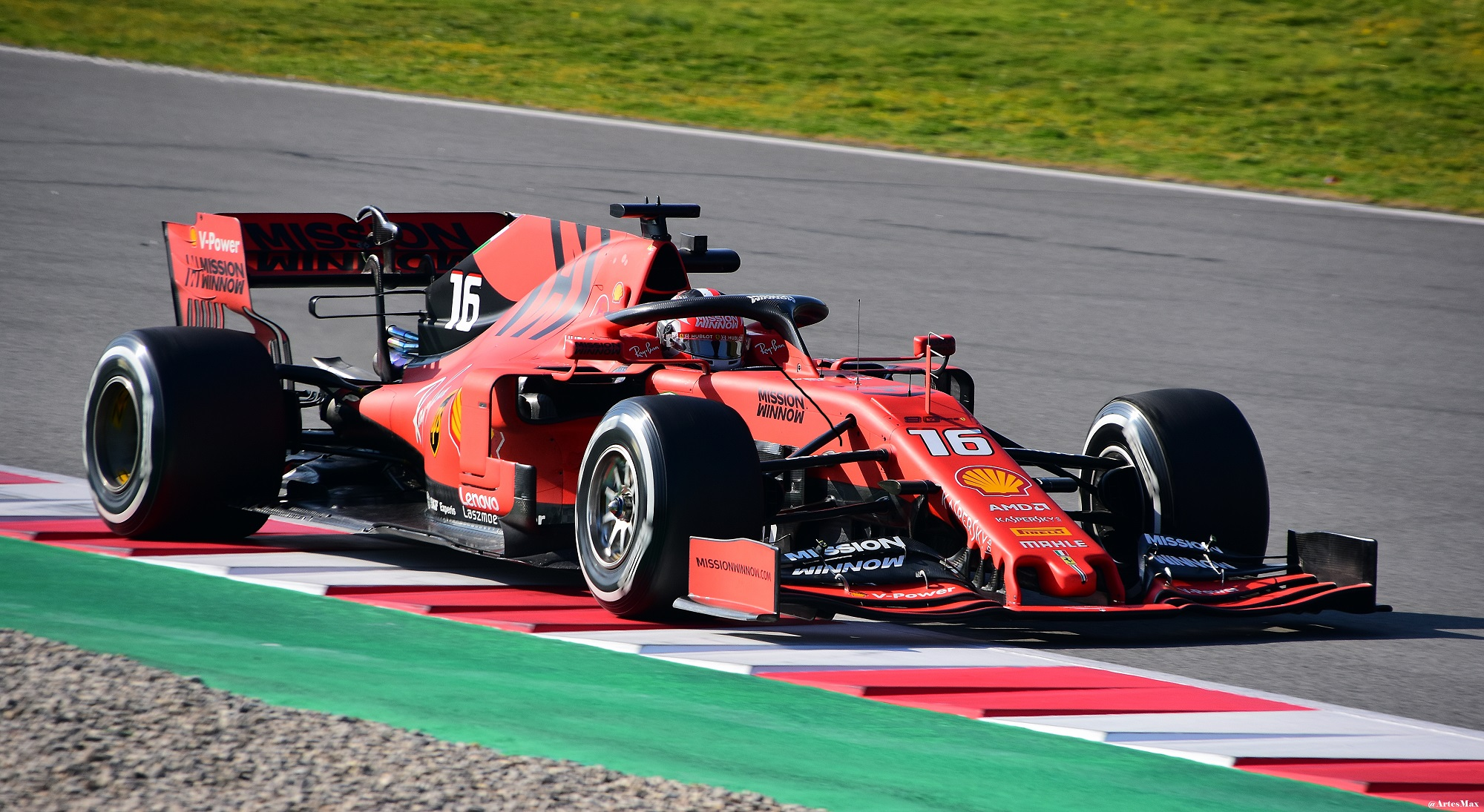
Leclerc moved to Ferrari in 2019, his second season in Formula One.

Leclerc signed for Ferrari in 2019, swapping seats with Kimi Räikkönen to partner four-time World Drivers' Champion Sebastian Vettel. Then-team principal Maurizio Arrivabene stated that his contract would run until 2022. Leclerc entered the 2018 post-season test with Ferrari at Yas Marina, setting the fastest time in the SF71H. He debuted for the team at the Australian Grand Prix, qualifying and finishing fifth. In Bahrain, Leclerc took his maiden pole position to become the second-youngest polesitter in Formula One history. He led the majority of the race before suffering an engine issue with 10 laps remaining; overtaken by both Mercedes drivers, he finished third, securing his maiden podium finish. Leclerc finished fifth in China, Azerbaijan, and Spain—behind Vettel at the former and latter after being ordered to let him pass. At the Monaco Grand Prix, he qualified sixteenth following a team strategy error; he suffered a race-ending tyre puncture after an overtake attempt on Nico Hülkenberg. Leclerc qualified and finished third at both the Canadian and French Grands Prix. He took pole at the Austrian Grand Prix, finishing second to Max Verstappen after his overtake on the third-to-last lap, during which they made contact—the stewards' investigation deemed it a racing incident. The pair engaged in a close battle throughout the British Grand Prix, with Leclerc finishing ahead in third to secure his fourth consecutive podium. He qualified in tenth-place in Germany amidst a fuel system issue; he climbed to fourth in the rain-affected race before being called in for dry tyres too early, causing him to lose traction and collide with the barriers. He then finished fourth in Hungary.

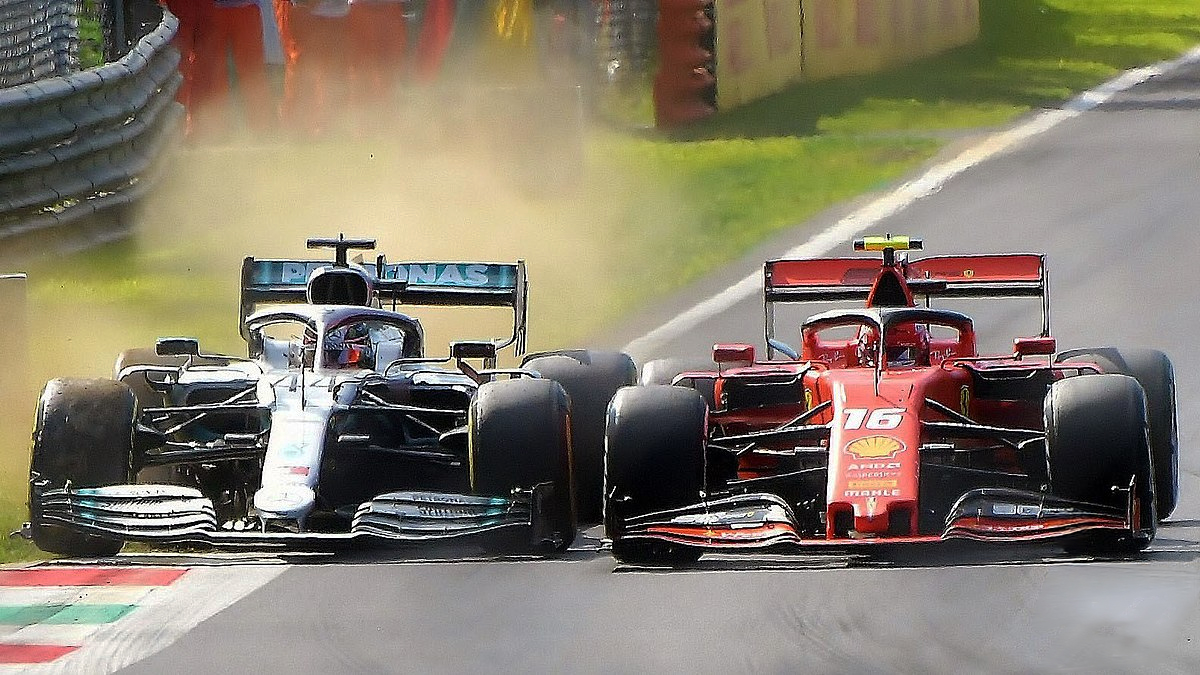
Leclerc won the Italian Grand Prix amidst a battle with Lewis Hamilton, which saw him nicknamed il Predestinato in Italian media.

Leclerc took pole for the Belgian Grand Prix, fending off Lewis Hamilton to become the third-youngest Formula One Grand Prix winner—aged 21—as well as the first Monégasque. He dedicated his victory to Anthoine Hubert, who was killed the day prior in FIA Formula 2. Leclerc then won the Italian Grand Prix from pole, defending the lead from both Mercedes drivers to become the first Ferrari winner at Monza since Fernando Alonso in 2010; his victories saw him nicknamed il Predestinato (lit. 'the Predestined') in Italian media. (Note: Per several sources:) He took pole again in Singapore and finished second after being undercut by teammate Vettel, promoting him to third in the championship. Leclerc described the strategy as "unfair", to which team principal Mattia Binotto responded that Vettel was allowed to pit first to defend his position. In Russia, he took his fourth consecutive pole and finished third, after a virtual safety car saw both Mercedes drivers pass Leclerc with shortened pit stops. He qualified second at the Japanese Grand Prix but took damage in a first-lap collision with Verstappen after understeering into his sidepod; he finished sixth. Leclerc finished fourth at the Mexican and United States Grands Prix, inheriting pole at the former after a grid penalty for Verstappen. A collision with Vettel caused both drivers to retire from the Brazilian Grand Prix, with Leclerc dropping below Verstappen in the standings. Both were reprimanded by Binotto, who stated they "should be sorry for the team". Leclerc finished the season-ending Abu Dhabi Grand Prix in third-place, clinching fourth in the World Drivers' Championship with 264 points, 24 ahead of teammate Vettel in fifth. In addition to winning the FIA Pole Trophy with seven poles, Leclerc recorded two victories from 10 podiums and was awarded the Lorenzo Bandini Trophy. He extended his Ferrari contract until the end of 2024.

==== 2020–2021: Winless seasons for Ferrari ====
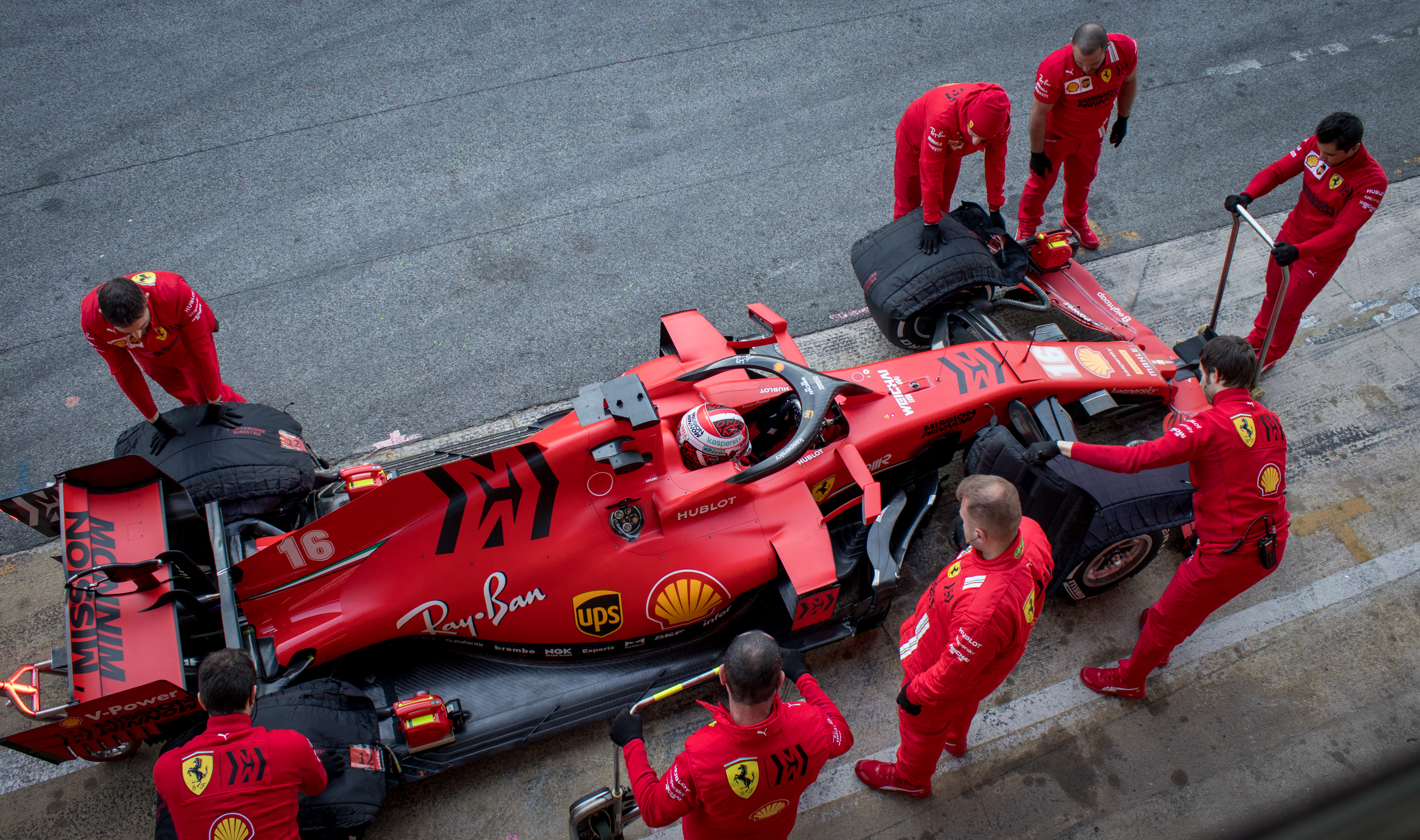
Leclerc (pictured at pre-season testing) achieved two podiums in 2020, driving the SF1000.

The 2020 season was delayed and shortened due to the COVID-19 pandemic, whilst Ferrari struggled for performance with the SF1000. Leclerc qualified seventh for the season-opening Austrian Grand Prix; he recovered to third-place in the race via several overtakes following the final safety car, promoted to second after a penalty for Lewis Hamilton. In the build-up to the Styrian Grand Prix, Leclerc was investigated by the FIA for allegedly breaching COVID-19 safety protocols whilst returning home to Monte Carlo; both Leclerc and Ferrari were given a warning for the incident. In Styria, Leclerc collided with teammate Sebastian Vettel on the first lap, causing them both to retire. Leclerc took full responsibility for the collision. After finishing eleventh at the Hungarian Grand Prix, Leclerc secured another podium at the British Grand Prix following a late puncture for Valtteri Bottas. Prior to the 70th Anniversary Grand Prix, Leclerc faced allegations of racism for opting to not take the knee during pre-race ceremonies; he responded by stating that racism is "disgusting" and accusing media outlets of manipulating his words, adding that he wanted to avoid promoting violent protest. He successfully completed a one-stop tyre strategy in the race, finishing fourth after qualifying eighth, stating that it "[felt] like victory". Leclerc suffered reliability issues at the Spanish and Belgian Grands Prix, retiring from the former and finishing fourteenth at the latter. At the Italian Grand Prix, he qualified thirteenth before colliding with a tyre barrier at the Curva Parabolica and causing a red flag whilst running in fourth. He then finished seven consecutive races in the points from Tuscany to Bahrain, with top-five finishes at the Portuguese, Emilia Romagna, and Turkish Grands Prix; at the latter, Leclerc lost a podium finish during a last-lap overtake attempt on Sergio Pérez for second, having qualified for the rain-affected race in fourteenth. He retired from the Sakhir Grand Prix after a first-lap collision with Pérez—for which he was given a three-place grid penalty—having qualified fourth. Ferrari struggled for pace at the season-ending Abu Dhabi Grand Prix, with Leclerc finishing thirteenth. He ended the season eighth in the standings with two podiums and 98 points, 65 ahead of teammate Vettel in thirteenth, as Ferrari finished sixth in the World Constructors' Championship—their lowest since 1980.

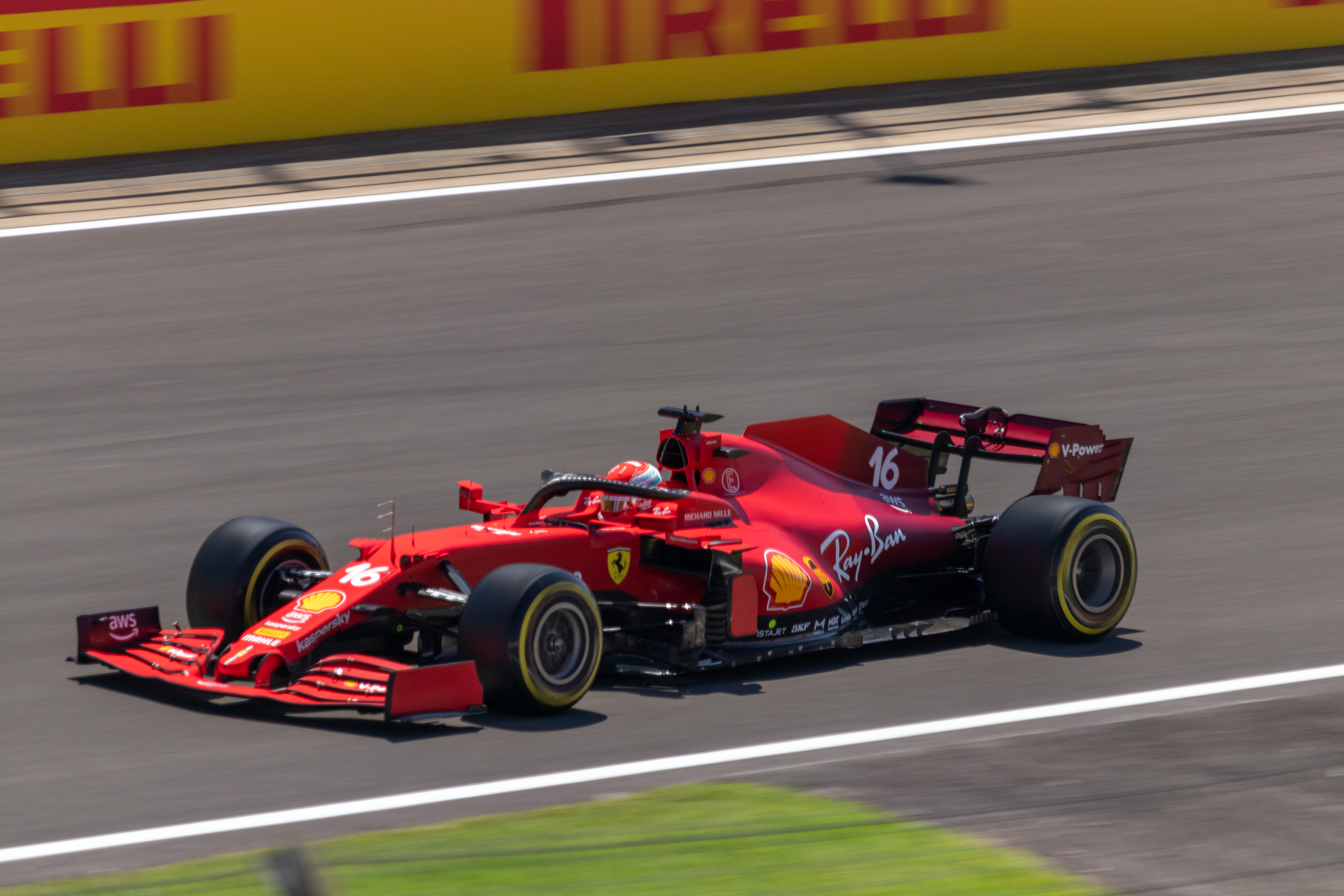
Leclerc (pictured at the British Grand Prix) qualified on pole position at the Monaco and Azerbaijan Grands Prix in 2021.

Leclerc was partnered by Carlos Sainz Jr. at Ferrari for his 2021 campaign. He started the Bahrain Grand Prix in fourth and finished sixth. He then finished fourth at the Emilia Romagna Grand Prix amidst a radio issue. His sixth-placed finish in Portugal dropped him to fifth in the standings, before he finished fourth again in Spain. Leclerc secured a surprise pole position at his home Grand Prix in Monaco—his first since the 2019 Mexican Grand Prix—after colliding with the barrier at La Piscine in the final part of qualifying, but was unable to start the race due to a related drive shaft issue. He qualified on pole again at the next round in Azerbaijan before finishing fourth. Tyre wear struggles at the French Grand Prix saw him finish sixteenth after taking an additional pit stop. He then finished seventh and eighth at the Styrian and Austrian Grands Prix, respectively. At the British Grand Prix, Leclerc qualified fourth before inheriting the lead on the first lap: he overtook Bottas off-the-line before passing both Max Verstappen and Hamilton after their collision. He held the lead until the third-to-last lap—when Hamilton passed him—finishing in second-place to claim his sole podium of the season. Leclerc retired from the rain-affected Hungarian Grand Prix after a first-lap collision with Lance Stroll, demoting him to seventh in the championship, below teammate Sainz. He finished eighth at the curtailed Belgian Grand Prix and fifth in the Netherlands. In Italy, Leclerc finished fourth after a penalty for Pérez. He took grid penalties for the Russian Grand Prix, forcing him to start nineteenth; after climbing to third, he was the last to pit for intermediate tyres in changing conditions, demoting him to fifteenth. Leclerc finished fourth at both the Turkish and United States Grands Prix, leading several laps at the former, before finishing fifth in Mexico City and São Paulo. After scoring points in Qatar and Saudi Arabia, Leclerc moved up to fifth in the championship, four points ahead of Lando Norris and 8.5 ahead of Sainz with one round remaining. At the Abu Dhabi Grand Prix, a pit stop gamble under the virtual safety car saw Leclerc lose track position, dropping him to tenth; this result saw both Sainz and Norris surpass his points tally, with Leclerc finishing seventh in the World Drivers' Championship on 159 points. This marked the first time Leclerc had been outscored by a teammate in his formula racing career.

==== 2022: Curtailed title battle vs. Verstappen ====
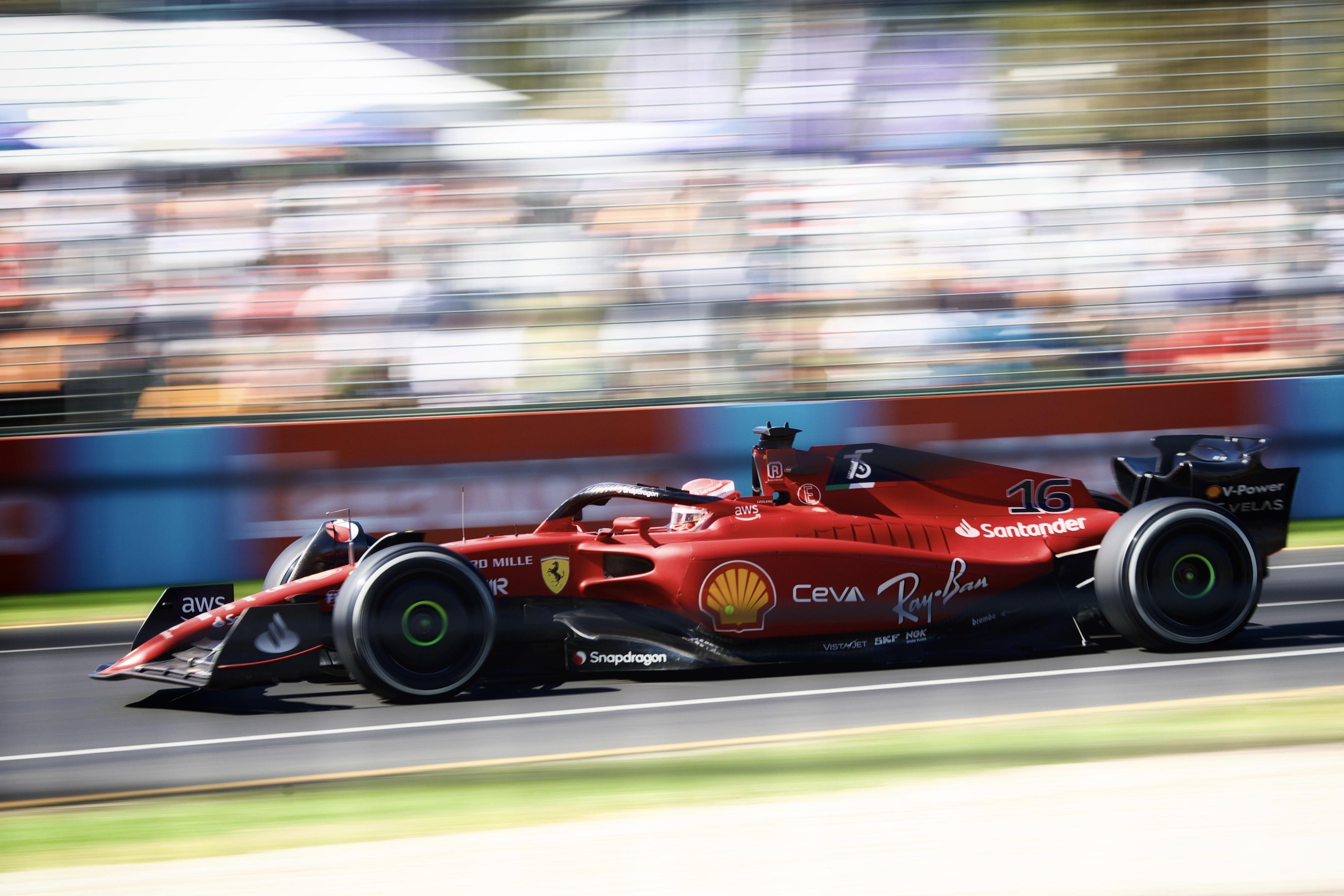
In 2022, Leclerc achieved his maiden career grand slam at the Australian Grand Prix (pictured) and led the championship until his retirement in Spain.

New regulations utilising ground effect saw Ferrari challenge Red Bull in the first half of 2022. Leclerc qualified on pole position for the season-opening Bahrain Grand Prix before winning the race amidst a close battle with Max Verstappen, marking his and Ferrari's first victory since 2019. The result saw him become the first Monégasque driver to lead the World Drivers' Championship. After finishing second to Verstappen in another close-fought battle in Saudi Arabia, Leclerc took a dominant victory from pole at the Australian Grand Prix, achieving his maiden grand slam in Formula One and extending his championship lead to 34 points over George Russell, 46 ahead of Verstappen in sixth. Following another battle with Verstappen in the Emilia Romagna Grand Prix sprint, Leclerc spun at the Variante Alta chicane whilst chasing Sergio Pérez for second-place in the main race, demoting him to sixth and reducing his advantage over Verstappen to 27 points. He finished second to Verstappen after starting on pole at the Miami Grand Prix. In Spain, Leclerc took pole again and led the race with a 13-second margin until a power unit failure forced his retirement, handing Verstappen the victory and championship lead. After taking another pole at the Monaco Grand Prix, Leclerc finished fourth due to a strategy error in wet-weather conditions. He took his fourth-successive pole at the Azerbaijan Grand Prix, where he again retired from the lead with a power unit issue, placing him third in the standings behind Pérez. Leclerc started nineteenth for the Canadian Grand Prix due to an engine grid penalty; he recovered to fifth. At the British Grand Prix, he finished fourth after losing out on a free pit stop under the safety car to his teammate, Carlos Sainz Jr.

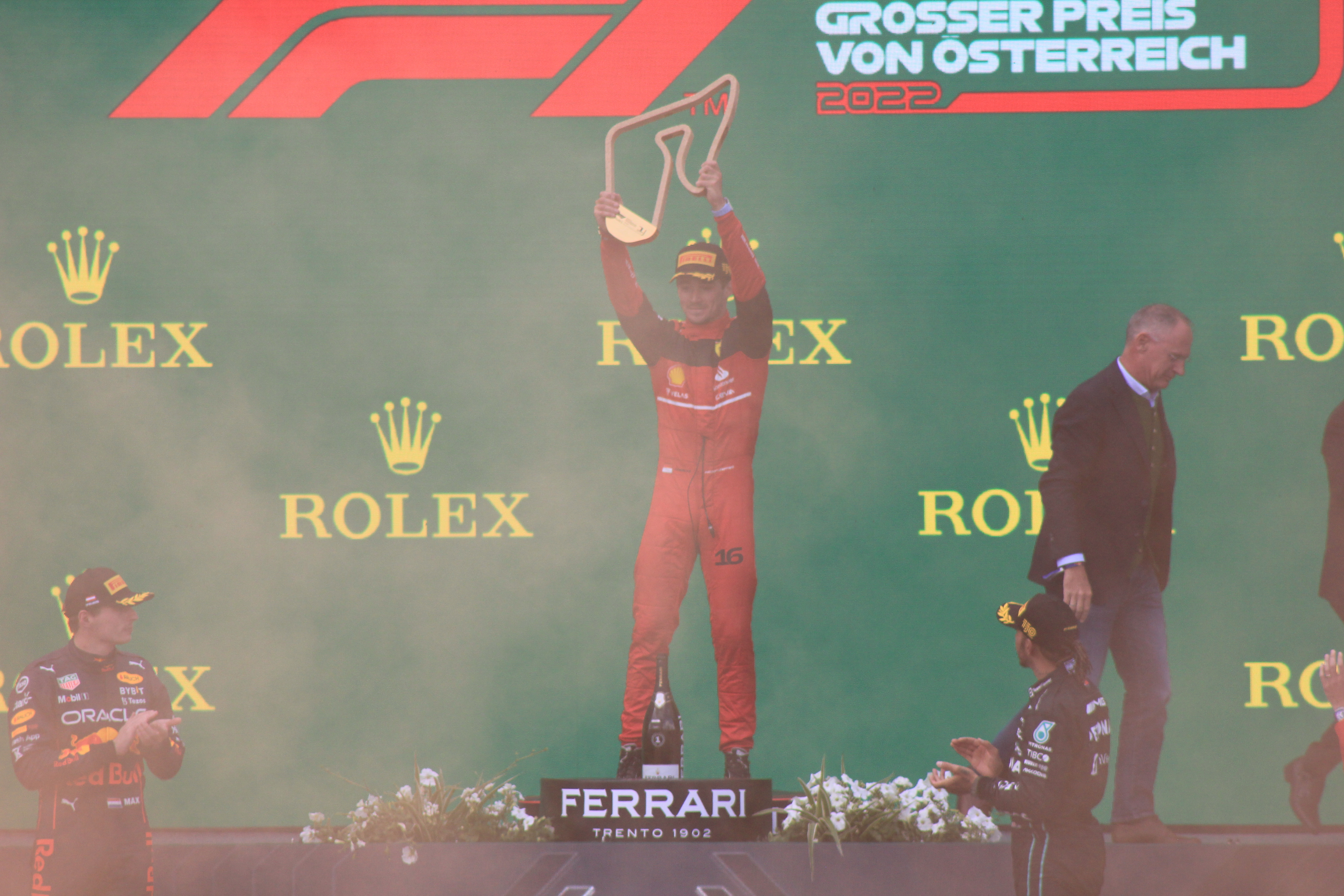
Leclerc (pictured at the Austrian Grand Prix) achieved three victories as he finished runner-up in the World Drivers' Championship to Max Verstappen.

Leclerc then took victory at the Austrian Grand Prix after a battle with Verstappen, returning to second in the standings halfway through the season. Ferrari struggled to match the performance of Red Bull from the French Grand Prix onwards, where Leclerc started on pole before spinning out of the lead on lap 18 and colliding with a barrier. In Hungary, he qualified third and finished sixth after another strategic error by Ferrari put him on underperforming hard-compound tyres; Verstappen won the race and extended his advantage over Leclerc to 80 points going into the summer break. Leclerc started fifteenth following a grid penalty at the Belgian Grand Prix, where he recovered to fifth, demoted to sixth after a five-second time penalty for speeding in the pit lane. Prior to the Dutch Grand Prix, he admitted that he had "stopped counting" his points deficit to Verstappen. He took five consecutive podiums from there until the United States Grand Prix, including second-placed finishes from pole in Italy and Singapore; Verstappen clinched the title in Japan. Leclerc finished sixth and fourth at the Mexico City and São Paulo Grands Prix, respectively—after a collision with Lando Norris at the latter—leaving him tied-second in the championship with Pérez on 290 points going into the final round. Leclerc qualified third for the Abu Dhabi Grand Prix behind Pérez, before overtaking him with a one-stop strategy and clinching second in the World Drivers' Championship. He totalled 308 points throughout the season, 146 behind Verstappen and 62 ahead of teammate Sainz in fifth. He led the field with nine pole positions and further achieved three victories from 11 podiums.

==== 2023–2024: First Monaco Grand Prix victory ====
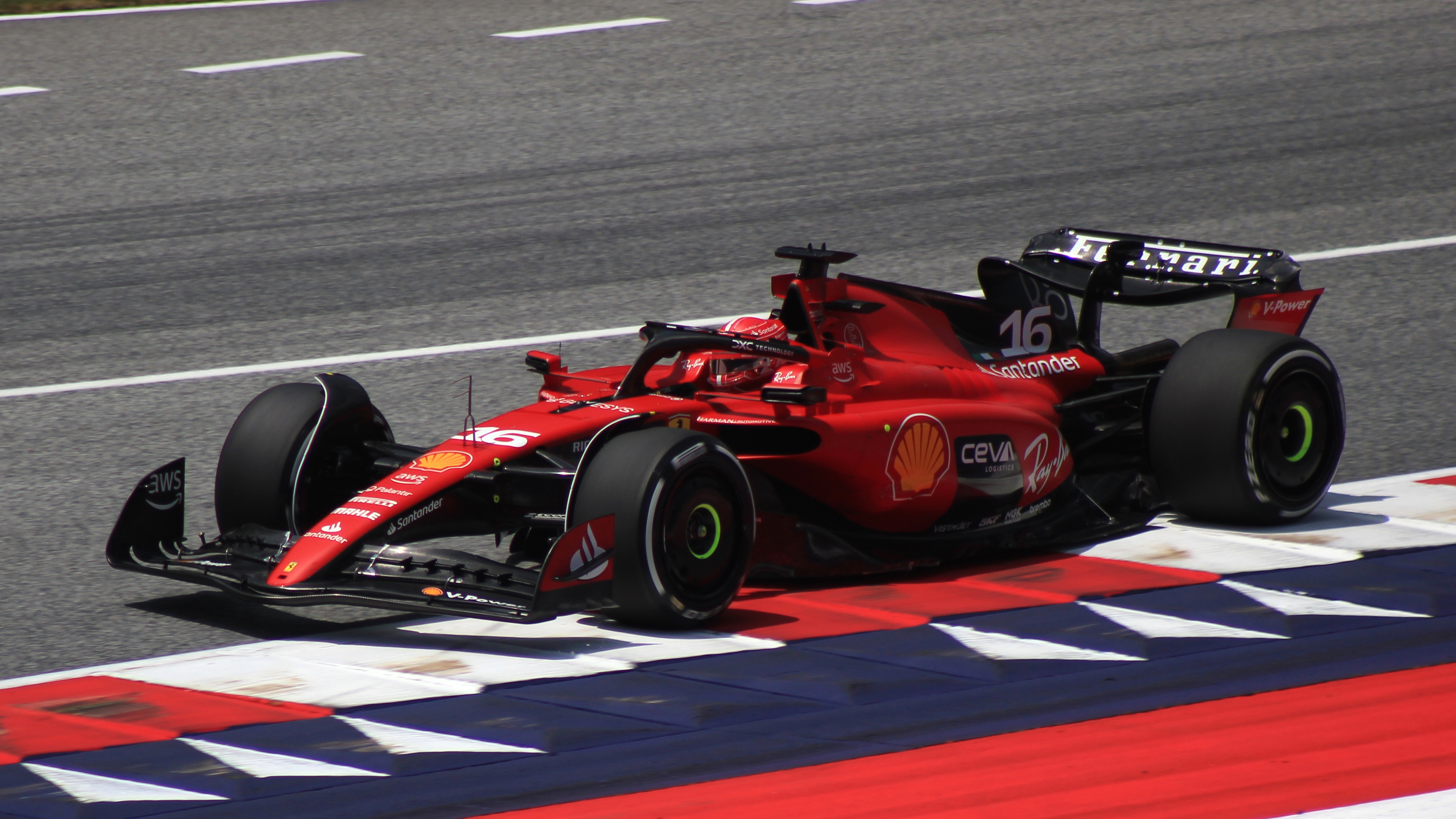
Leclerc (pictured at the Austrian Grand Prix) achieved five pole positions and six podium finishes in 2023.

Ferrari struggled for consistent race pace and tyre wear throughout the early stages of 2023, as Red Bull consolidated their advantage from the previous year. Leclerc qualified third for the Bahrain Grand Prix, where he remained for the majority of the race before retiring with a technical issue. He subsequently took a grid penalty in Saudi Arabia, recovering to seventh after starting twelfth with a ten-position drop. Leclerc retired from the Australian Grand Prix following a first-lap collision with Lance Stroll. Leclerc then qualified on pole position at the Azerbaijan Grand Prix, finishing second in the sprint and third in the main race. After crashing out of qualifying in Miami, he started and finished seventh. He improved to sixth at the Monaco Grand Prix after receiving a three-place grid drop for impeding Lando Norris in qualifying. In Spain, he qualified nineteenth and started the race from the pit lane—describing the SF-23 as "undriveable"; he finished the race eleventh. Leclerc recovered from tenth to fourth in Canada after a pit stop gamble under the safety car. He qualified on the front-row for the Austrian Grand Prix, leading briefly before being overtaken by Max Verstappen for the win. He finished ninth and seventh at the British and Hungarian Grands Prix, respectively, amidst issues with tyre degradation and strategy. Leclerc achieved another pole position at the Belgian Grand Prix after a grid penalty for Verstappen; he finished third. After retiring from the rain-affected Dutch Grand Prix with damage, Leclerc finished fourth at the following three races in Italy, Singapore, and Japan. He then finished fifth in Qatar. He returned to pole at the United States Grand Prix and finished second in the sprint. He fell to sixth in the main race before both he and Lewis Hamilton were disqualified for excessive skid block wear. Leclerc again qualified on pole in Mexico City, finishing third after a first-corner collision with Sergio Pérez. He qualified on the front-row for the São Paulo Grand Prix before crashing out of the formation lap amidst a hydraulics issue at Ferradura. He qualified on pole again for the inaugural Las Vegas Grand Prix, where he was involved in a three-way battle for the lead with Verstappen and Pérez; Leclerc finished second after overtaking the latter on the final lap, which later won him the Overtake Award. He finished second again in Abu Dhabi, elevating him to fifth in the World Drivers' Championship on 206 points, level with Fernando Alonso in fourth, (Note: Leclerc and Alonso both scored 206 points in 2023, with Alonso classified ahead on count-back, by virtue of having more third-placed finishes.) and six ahead of teammate Carlos Sainz Jr. in seventh. Leclerc achieved five pole positions and six podiums throughout the season.

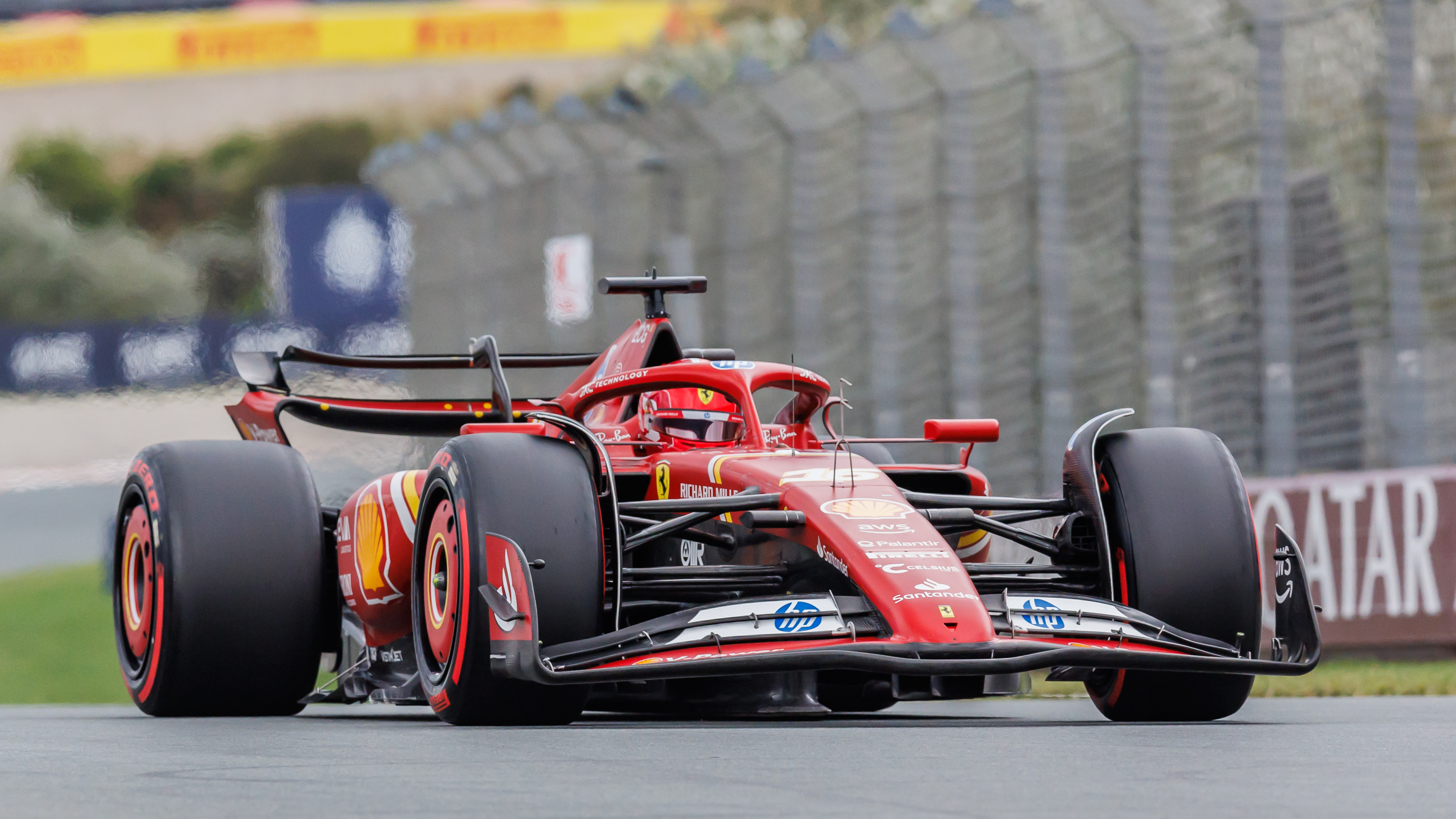
Leclerc (pictured at the Dutch Grand Prix) won three Grands Prix from 13 podiums in 2024, including the Monaco Grand Prix.

Ahead of the 2024 season, Leclerc opted to extend his contract with Ferrari beyond the 2026 regulation changes. Red Bull remained the front-runners going into the season-opener, where Leclerc vowed he would do "absolutely everything" to contend; he qualified on the front-row and finished fourth amidst brake issues. He improved to third at the Saudi Arabian Grand Prix before completing a Ferrari 1–2 finish in Australia—their first since the 2022 Bahrain Grand Prix—as he finished second to Sainz. After finishing fourth at both the Japanese and Chinese Grands Prix, Leclerc secured third-placed finishes in Miami and Emilia Romagna, as well as second in the former sprint race. Leclerc then won the Monaco Grand Prix—his home race—for the first time in his career, having started on pole position. He became the first Monégasque driver to win the event since Louis Chiron in 1931, and the first to do so in the Formula One World Championship. Leclerc retired from the Canadian Grand Prix with power unit issues. After placing fifth at the Spanish Grand Prix, he finished outside of the points in Austria and Britain due to collision damage and strategy errors, dropping him from second to third in the standings behind Norris. He then finished fourth in Hungary. Leclerc again qualified on pole at the Belgian Grand Prix after a grid drop for Verstappen, finishing third after a disqualification for George Russell. Another third-place followed at the Dutch Grand Prix. Leclerc received widespread acclaim for his surprise victory at the Italian Grand Prix, completing a one-stop strategy to secure Ferrari's first home win since 2019. Leclerc qualified first at the Azerbaijan Grand Prix—his fourth consecutive pole at the event—and finished second after a race-long battle with Oscar Piastri. He finished fifth in Singapore, before taking his third victory of the season at the United States Grand Prix. He then finished third in Mexico City. After a podium in the São Paulo sprint, he finished fifth in the rain-affected Grand Prix amidst car performance concerns and a strategy error. Following a fourth-placed finish in Las Vegas, Leclerc completed the season with podiums at the Qatar and Abu Dhabi Grands Prix, having started the latter in nineteenth. He finished the season third in the championship on 356 points—81 behind champion Verstappen, 18 behind Norris, and 66 ahead of teammate Sainz in fifth; he outscored the rest of the field from the summer break onwards, and achieved three victories from 13 podiums.

==== 2025–2026: Partnership with Hamilton ====
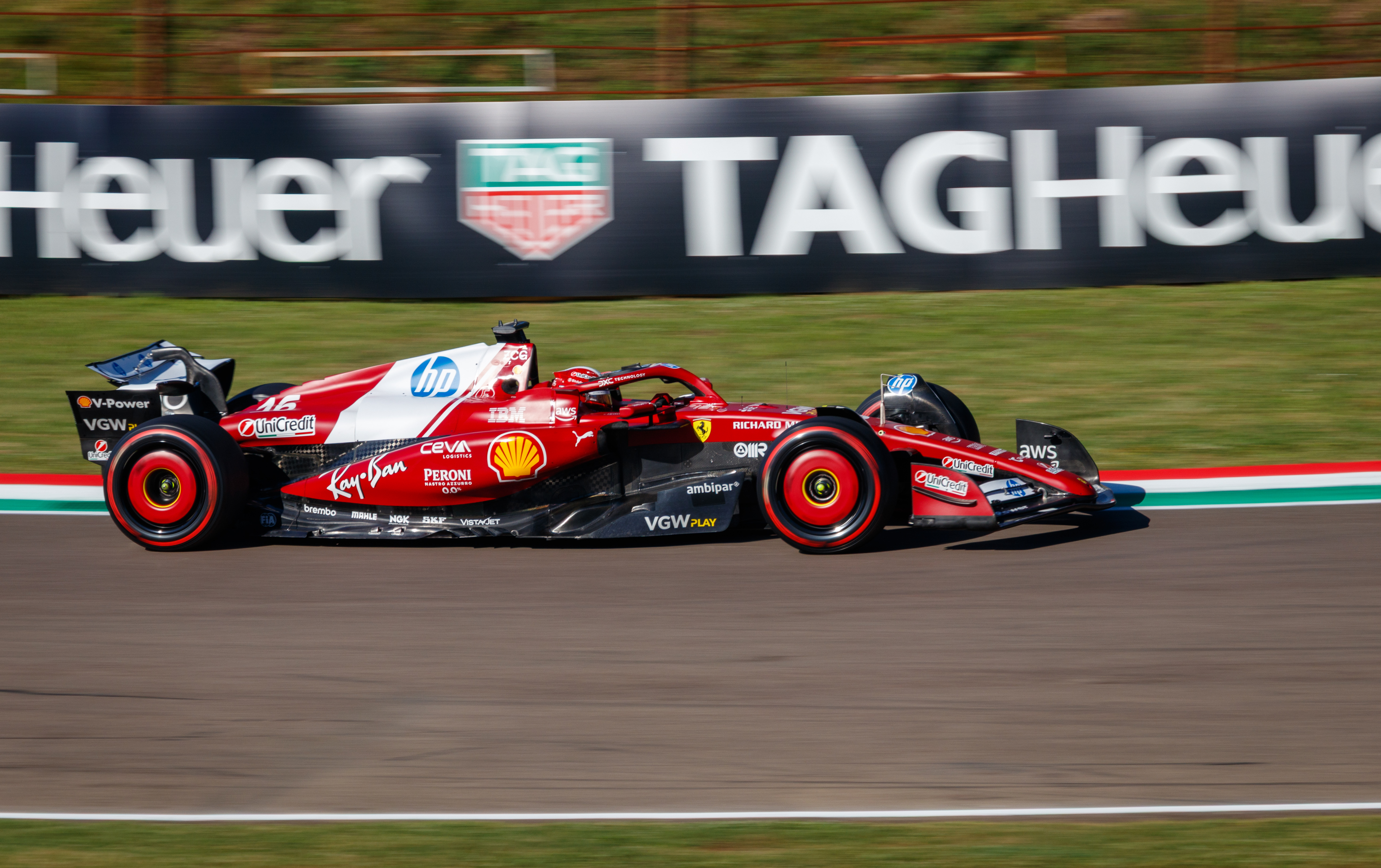
Leclerc (pictured at the Emilia Romagna Grand Prix) is partnered by Lewis Hamilton from 2025 onwards.

Leclerc was partnered by seven-time World Drivers' Champion Lewis Hamilton in 2025. Prior to the season, Leclerc stated he was "ready [to win] the championship", with Ferrari expected to challenge McLaren. He finished eighth at the rain-affected Australian Grand Prix after a strategic error, and was disqualified from fifth in China after his SF-25 was found to be underweight. He finished fourth at both the Japanese and Bahrain Grands Prix amidst performance concerns, before claiming his first podium of the season with third-place in Saudi Arabia. He aquaplaned into the barriers during the reconnaissance lap for the Miami Grand Prix sprint, later qualifying eighth for the main race, which he finished in seventh. He climbed from eleventh to fourth in Emilia Romagna before a late safety car saw him drop to sixth on aging tyres—85 points behind championship leader Oscar Piastri; Leclerc stated he "[could not] accept the situation [Ferrari were] in". Ferrari improved in Monaco with Leclerc qualifying and finishing second; he then claimed third in Spain following a late safety car, fifth in Canada, and third again in Austria. He was self-critical after qualifying sixth in Britain, then dropping to fourteenth on a mistimed wet-weather strategy. Fourth in the Belgian Grand Prix sprint, he qualified third and held position from Verstappen in the wet–dry main race. He took a surprise pole in Hungary, where he led the majority of the race before dropping to fourth after encountering setup issues. He ran fifth at the Dutch Grand Prix until a collision with Kimi Antonelli at Hugenholtzbocht forced his retirement, before maintaining fourth in Italy amidst an early battle with third-placed Piastri. He crashed out of qualifying in Azerbaijan and finished ninth, prior to claiming sixth in Singapore amidst increasing concerns with the SF-25. Fifth in the United States sprint, he retained third in the Grand Prix in a race-long battle for second with Lando Norris. His front-row start in Mexico City preceded a contentious first-corner encounter with Norris, Hamilton, and Verstappen, where Leclerc retained second after evading to the run-off area and withstanding a late Verstappen charge. He clinched fifth in the São Paulo sprint before retiring from third in the Grand Prix amidst a collision with Antonelli and Piastri at the Senna 'S'. Intra-team conflict heightened when Leclerc and Hamilton entered a public feud with chairman John Elkann as they dropped to fourth in the World Constructors' Championship. Ferrari—who abandoned the SF-25 project early in the season—saw their performance regress further across the final three Grands Prix. Leclerc claimed fourth in Las Vegas following a double McLaren disqualification, eighth in Qatar after several excursions in his thirteenth-placed sprint, and fourth in Abu Dhabi as he pressured champion-elect Norris; he finished four positions ahead of teammate Hamilton in each race. Leclerc closed his campaign, and the ground effect era, fifth overall on 242 points—86 ahead of Hamilton in sixth—with seven podiums to Hamilton's zero, who he outscored at 19 of 24 Grands Prix.

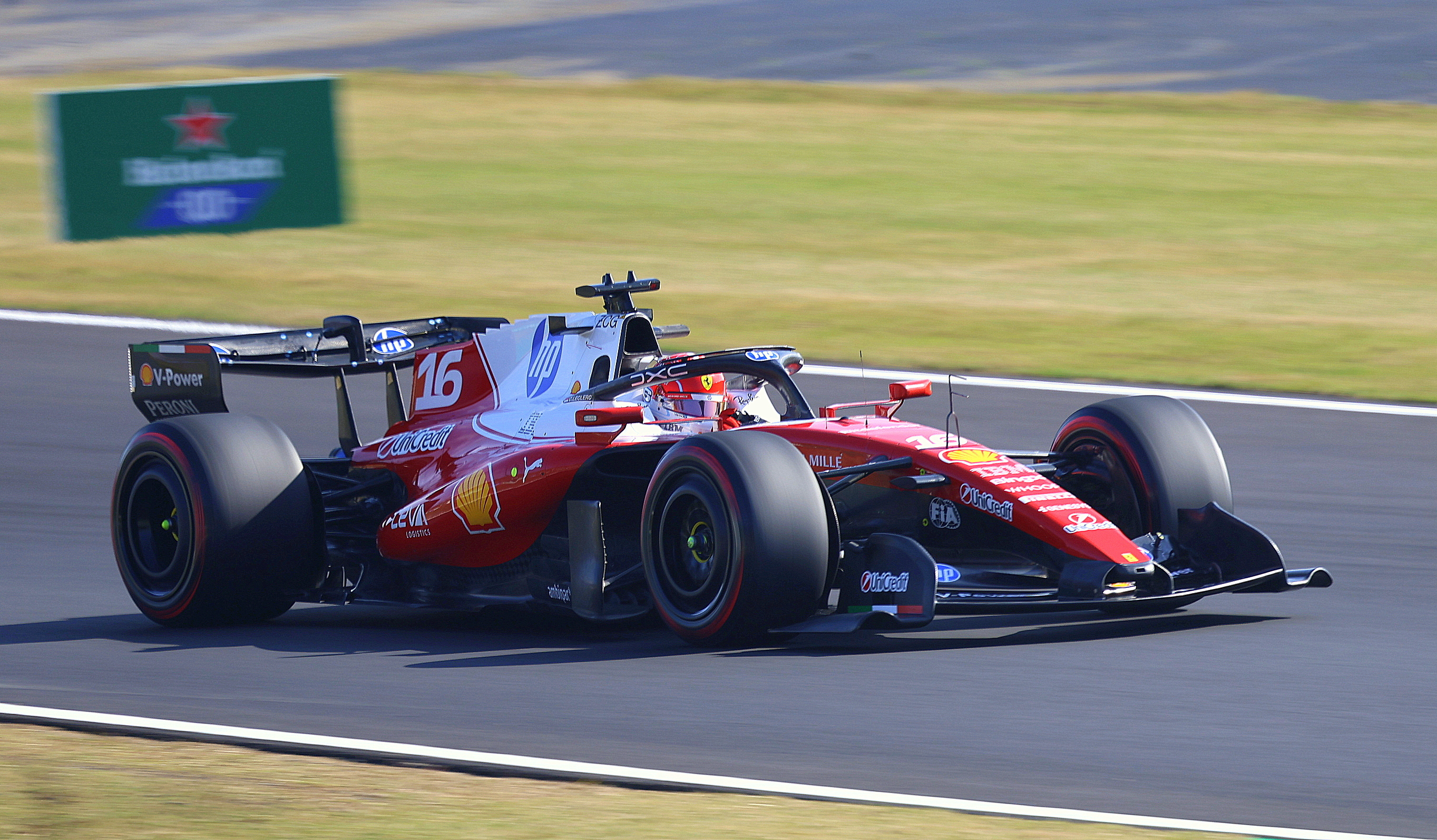
Leclerc (pictured at the Japanese Grand Prix) has achieved six podiums in 2026, following a regulation overhaul.

Ahead of new chassis and power unit regulations in 2026, Leclerc stated "it is now or never" for his prospect of a World Drivers' Championship with Ferrari. Having displayed strong pre-season performance with the SF-26, he immediately passed three drivers to lead the Australian Grand Prix, swapping the lead seven times with polesitter George Russell before dropping to third as Ferrari declined the chance to pit behind the virtual safety car. (Note: In Formula One, making a pit stop under virtual safety car conditions mitigates the net time loss in the pits, as the cars on-track are running at a reduced speed.) Runner-up to Russell in the China sprint, Leclerc lost out in a Grand Prix–long battle with Hamilton for third, before returning to the podium in Japan. At the Miami Grand Prix, Leclerc placed third in both the sprint and qualifying for the main race. However, despite finishing sixth on track at the main race, he received a twenty-second time penalty for leaving the track on several occasions without reason, leading to an eighth place finish. He finished fifth in the Canadian Grand Prix sprint, before qualifying eighth and finishing fourth in the main race. Prior to the Monaco Grand Prix, Leclerc signed a two-year contract extension with Ferrari through the end of 2028, amidst links to Aston Martin and Red Bull. Leclerc won the 2026 British Grand Prix ahead of George Russell and Lewis Hamilton, and placed second at the subsequent Belgian Grand Prix behind championship leader Kimi Antonelli. He qualified second and finished fourth at the Hungarian Grand Prix. He suffered his second retirement at the Italian Grand Prix after crashing out from fourth whilst battling Oscar Piastri. Subsequently, he placed fourth at the Spanish Grand Prix, the Azerbaijan Grand Prix, and the Bahrain Grand Prix. Leclerc returned to the podium with a second-place finish in Singapore, before placing second again at the United States Grand Prix. In Mexico, he received a five-second penalty for leaving track limits, eventually finishing fourth. He placed eighth at the São Paulo Grand Prix, where he received another five-second penalty for causing a collision with Racing Bulls driver Liam Lawson.

== Driver profile ==
=== Qualifying pace ===
As a driver, you always have the confidence you are the fastest and I do have that whenever I go for a qualifying lap.

It's all about that mindset and putting that lap together in qualifying when it is needed and the pressure is super-high. This is an exercise I have always loved.

I've always said I drive a lot with intuition; I work a lot, of course, but that is where one of my strengths is—that I feel things very, very quickly.

— Leclerc, asked by BBC Sport whether he was the fastest qualifier in Formula One in 2024

Leclerc has a strong qualifying history in Formula One, where he holds the record for most pole positions without a World Drivers' Championship (27) and the eleventh-most in history. He also holds the record in either FIA Formula 2 or its predecessor GP2 for the most pole positions in a season (8). His driving style tends to favour a car with oversteer, allowing for precise micro-corrections and high cornering speeds, which has aided his qualifying pace. He became the youngest recipient of the FIA Pole Trophy in 2019 for achieving the most pole positions, a feat he repeated in 2022. Critics have noted his ability to outperform his machinery in qualifying conditions, which has frequently led to his one-lap pace relatively surpassing his race pace and contributed to a pole–win conversion rate of 18.5%. Andrew Benson of BBC Sport described his pole lap at the 2019 Singapore Grand Prix as "one of the qualifying performances of the season". In 2020, a study by Amazon Web Services that focused on qualifying performance assessed Leclerc as the seventh-fastest Formula One driver of all time.

After his back-to-back poles at the Monaco and Azerbaijan Grands Prix in 2021, then-teammate Carlos Sainz Jr. proclaimed Leclerc as the best qualifier in Formula One. Edd Straw of The Race commented that "if you're talking about a driver who can consistently wring the neck of a car regardless of its limitations and successfully live on the edge in a livewire qualifying lap then you need to look no further than [Leclerc]", and that "his willingness to be on or even slightly over the limit, mitigated by his outstanding car control when things do get untidy, allows him to drag stunning lap times even out of cars that aren't handling well." He described his "relentless pursuit of perfect laps" as a characteristic that could make Leclerc "one of [the] all-time greatest qualifiers". Laurence Edmondson of ESPN described his pole lap at the 2022 Azerbaijan Grand Prix as his "latest example of his pinpoint precision and masterful speed", adding that he was "undoubtedly making a claim for the title of [Formula One]'s fastest driver over a single lap"; he praised "his ability to extract the fastest laps consistently while dealing with the pressure of a title fight". Mark Hughes described him as "Senna-like" at Monaco, noting his 5 km/h (3.1 mph) advantage at the high-speed Tabac in 2025. His pole lap at the Hungarian Grand Prix that year—where he usurped the dominant McLaren MCL39—was described as "sensational". (Note: Per several sources:) Karun Chandhok has acclaimed Leclerc as the fastest qualifier of all time, and Martin Brundle opined he was the fastest amongst the 2023 drivers.

=== Racecraft ===
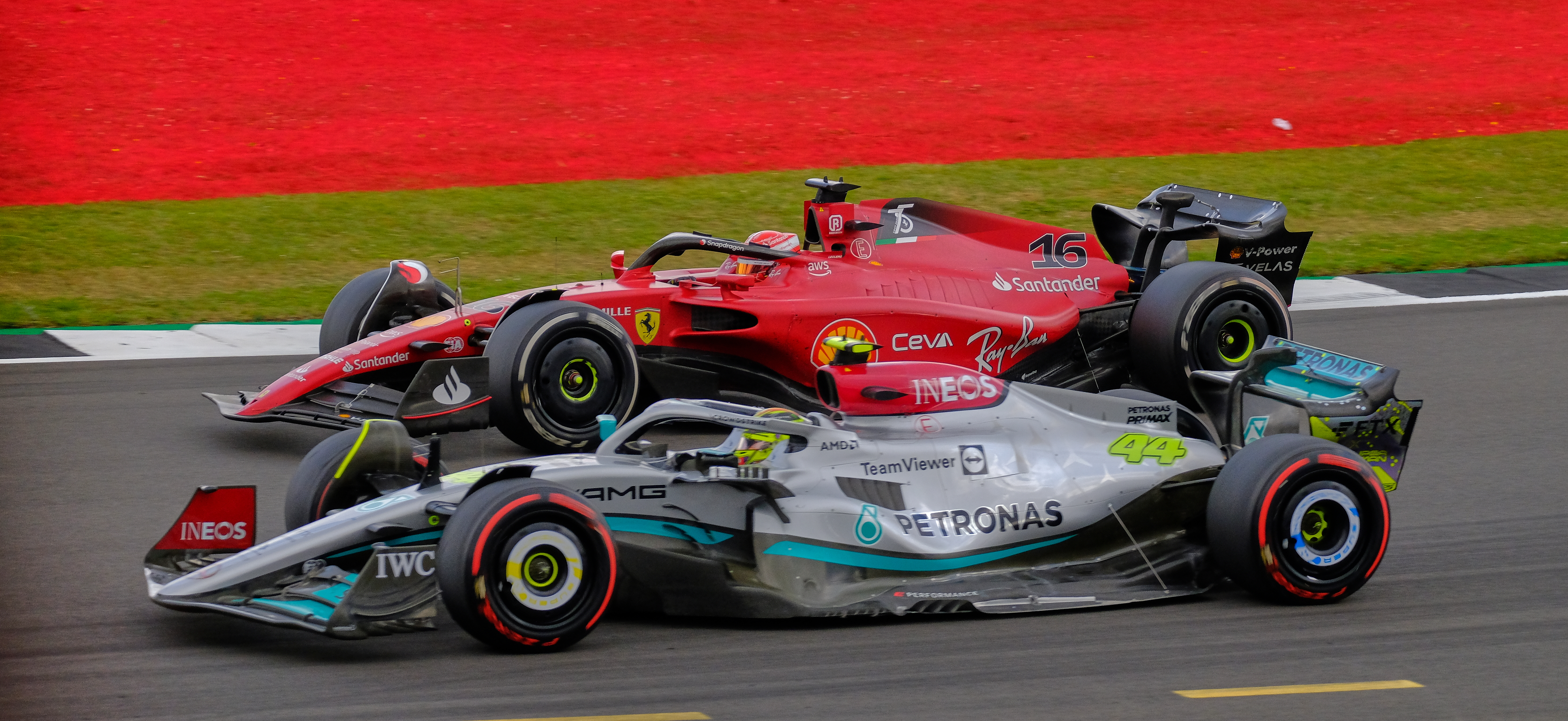
Leclerc (back) racing against Lewis Hamilton at the 2022 British Grand Prix, where Hamilton praised his defence

Leclerc has been noted by critics for his proficiency in wheel-to-wheel racing. After ceding the lead of the 2019 Austrian Grand Prix to Max Verstappen in the closing laps, Leclerc claimed Verstappen's move was "not the way you overtake" and that he would adjust his aggression going forward. The following race, he beat Verstappen in a hard-fought contest for third, which Vijay Pattni of Top Gear summarised as "holy heck, what a fight. Both younglings threw their cars at each other, both refused to yield any space, and both—miracously—avoided coming together." Leclerc declared it "the most fun [he has] had in [Formula One]", whilst Verstappen added "I think he was a little bit sore still from Austria so he was defending really hard, but it is fine, I am all for that". He was nicknamed il Predestinato (lit. 'the Predestined') in Italian media after defending his lead at the 2019 Italian Grand Prix from both Lewis Hamilton and Valtteri Bottas. He was praised for his first-corner overtake on Bottas at the 2021 Spanish Grand Prix, with Jonathan Noble of Motorsport.com describing the move as "sensational".

Leclerc received acclaim for his battle with Verstappen at the 2022 Bahrain Grand Prix, where he was noted for his effective use of the drag reduction system. He was praised by Hamilton after their battle at the 2022 British Grand Prix, where Leclerc overtook him around the outside of Copse on older tyres. Alex Kalinauckas of Autosport lauded his racecraft after the 2024 season, highlighting several instances of his defensive driving against faster machinery, as well as an overtake on George Russell at the Chinese Grand Prix. He was further acclaimed for his tyre management at the Italian Grand Prix. He has also been criticised for race-ending mistakes throughout his early seasons in Formula One, particularly at the 2020 Italian, 2020 Sakhir, and 2022 French Grands Prix; he was further penalised for causing a collision with Verstappen at the 2019 Japanese Grand Prix and for erratically defending from Russell at the 2025 Hungarian Grand Prix. The 1996 World Drivers' Champion, Damon Hill, described his racing mentality as "win or bust".

=== Helmet ===
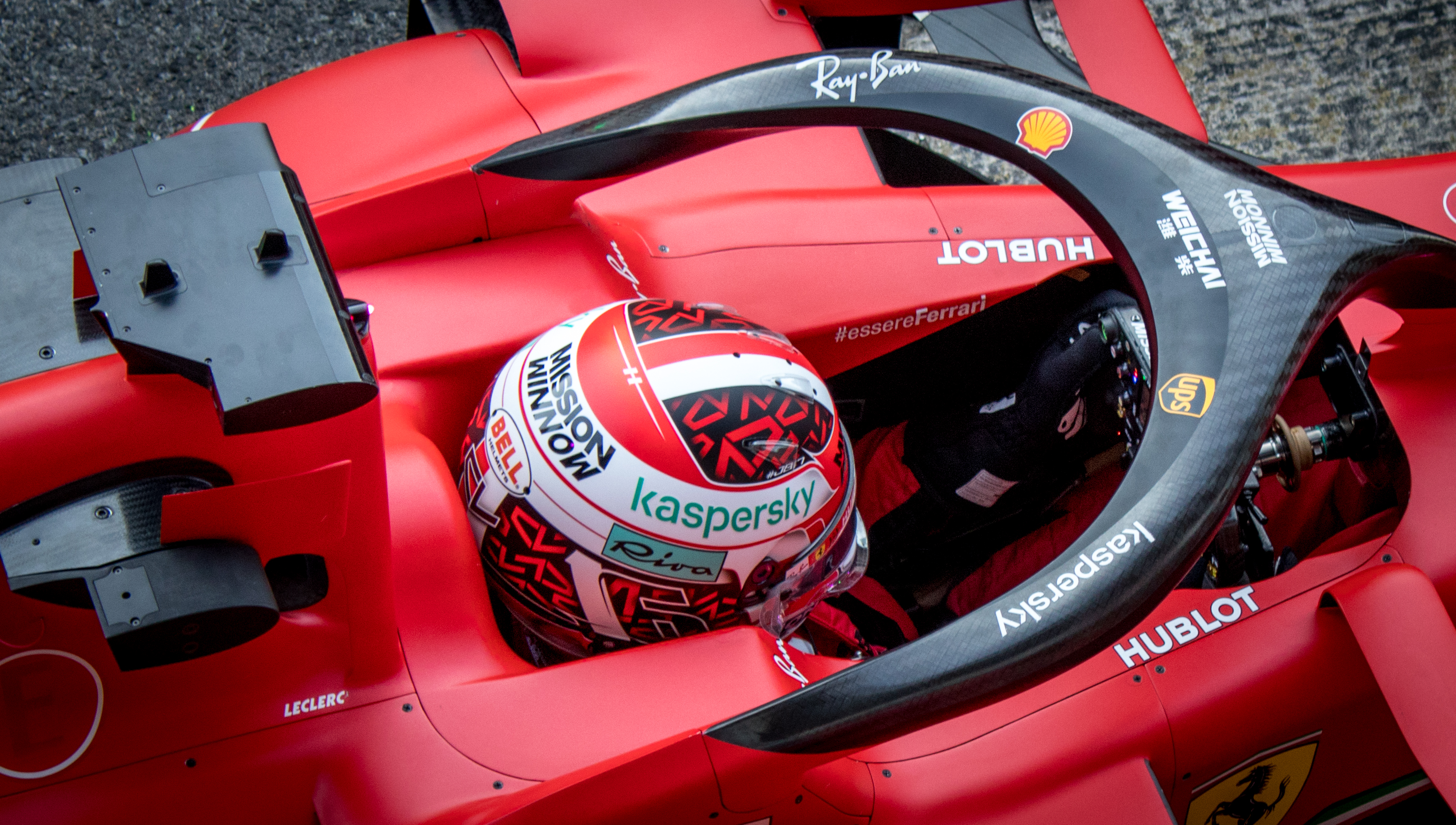
Leclerc's 2020 helmet design featured the flag of Monaco surrounded by his logo in rosso corsa.

Leclerc's helmet design features a base colour of rosso corsa with a Monégasque flag stripe along the lid. The words "Papa" and "Jules" are inscribed on the side, in remembrance of his father, Hervé Leclerc, and his godfather, Jules Bianchi. He wore a full tribute helmet to both at the 2019 Monaco Grand Prix and to Bianchi at the 2024 Japanese Grand Prix, the tenth anniversary of his fatal accident. He had previously worn a tribute for Sebastian Vettel at the 2020 Abu Dhabi Grand Prix—their final race as teammates. Controversy arose over his Gilles Villeneuve design for the 2023 Canadian Grand Prix after the Villeneuve family claimed he did not ask for permission; Jacques Villeneuve permitted its usage in a discussion with Leclerc following the rift. He wore a tribute design for departing teammate Carlos Sainz Jr. at the 2024 Abu Dhabi Grand Prix.

== Other ventures ==
=== Film and television ===
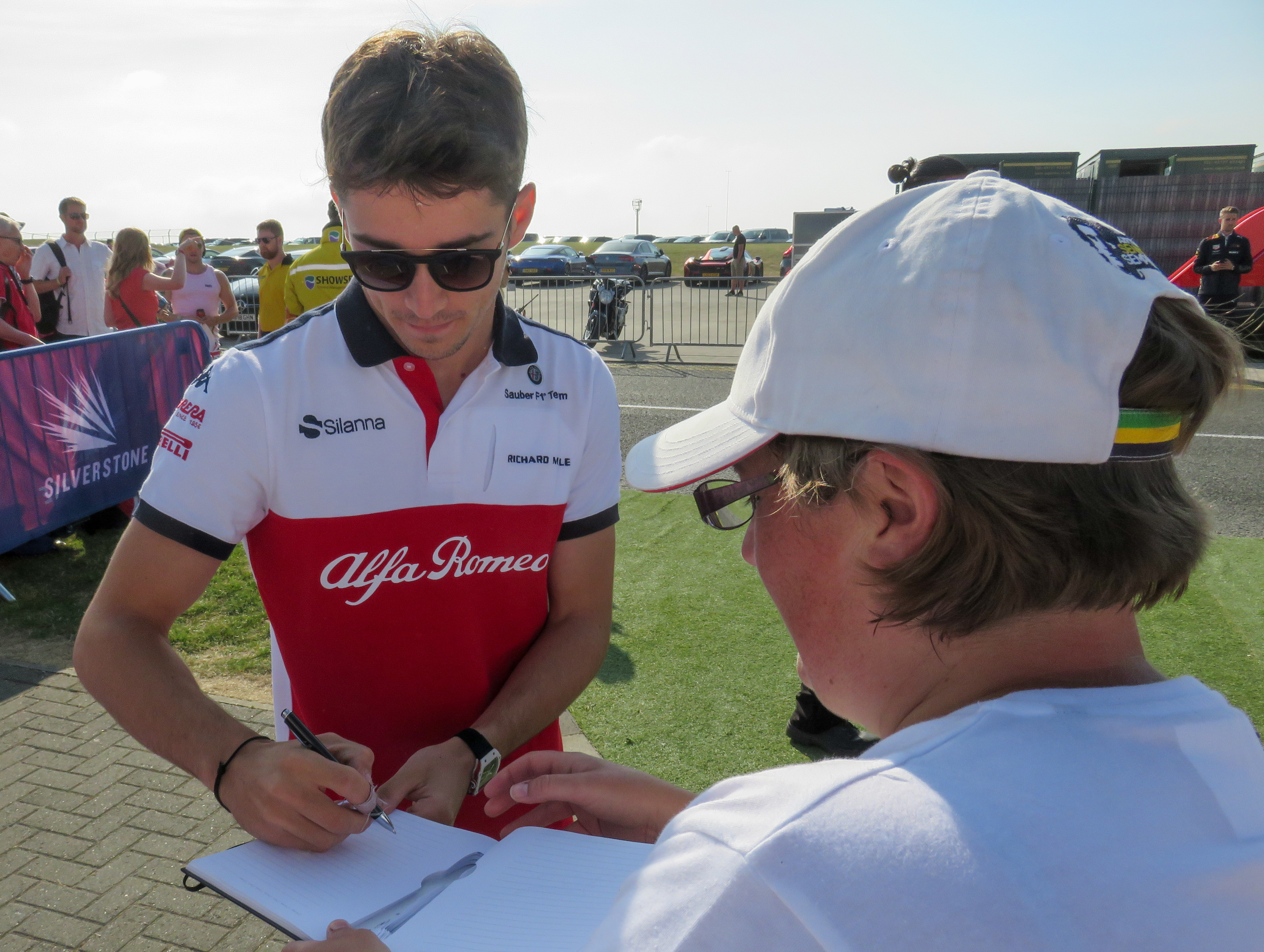
Leclerc with a fan at the 2018 British Grand Prix

Leclerc starred in Claude Lelouch's Le Grand Rendez-vous (2020)—a remake of the 1976 French short film C'était un rendez-vous—where he lapped the Circuit de Monaco in a Ferrari SF90 Stradale with Prince Albert II. In partnership with Ferrari, Leclerc made his voice acting debut in the Italian-language version of Pixar's Toy Story animated spin-off film Lightyear (2022). In November 2024, Leclerc appeared in Charles Leclerc – Supersonique, a Canal+ documentary, where he attempted aerobatics in a Dassault Rafale with the French Air and Space Force at Saint-Dizier – Robinson Air Base; he used the call sign Perceval and successfully endured a 9 g (88 m/s^{2}; 290 ft/s^{2}) manoeuvre, as well as an aerial refuelling mission.

=== Music ===
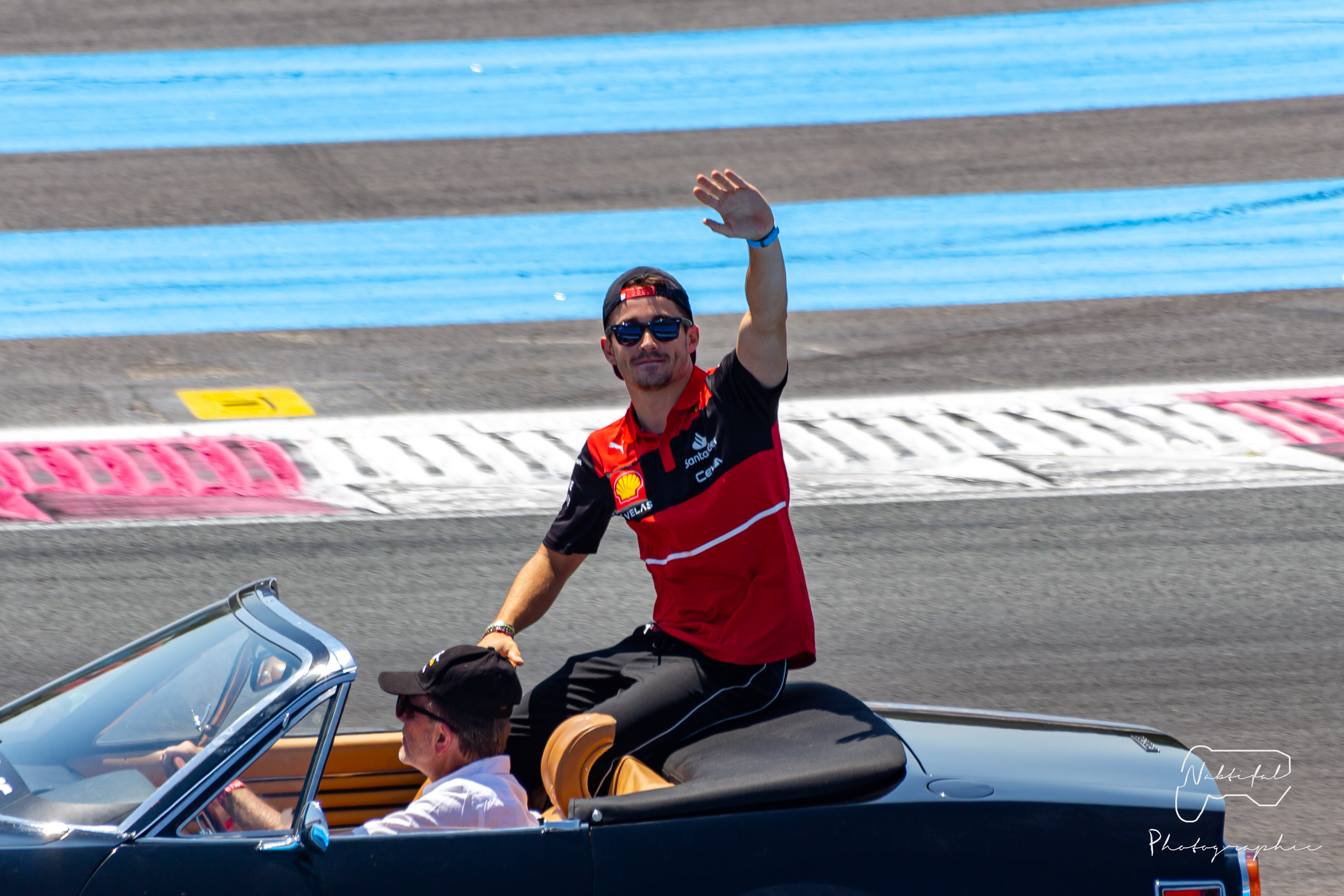
Leclerc before the 2022 French Grand Prix

Leclerc began playing the piano aged six and committed to mastering the instrument during the COVID-19 lockdowns. In April 2023, Leclerc released his debut piano-composed single "AUS23 (1:1)", whose title is a reference to Ferrari's internal name for the 2023 Australian Grand Prix. He released further singles for the Miami and Monaco Grands Prix, titled "MIA23 (1:2)" and "MON23 (1:3)", respectively. He used production software to pair his piano notes with violin. In February 2024, he released his debut extended play, Dreamers, alongside French pianist Sofiane Pamart, which peaked at number two on the Billboard Classical Albums chart and number one on the Classical Crossover Albums chart, also charting in Germany and Switzerland. Talking to Rolling Stone that year, Leclerc stated "whenever I'm not [racing], music is what I love." In February 2025, he released a two-sided single titled "MC24 / SIN24", featuring compositions made during the Monaco and Singapore Grands Prix in 2024.

=== Endorsements ===
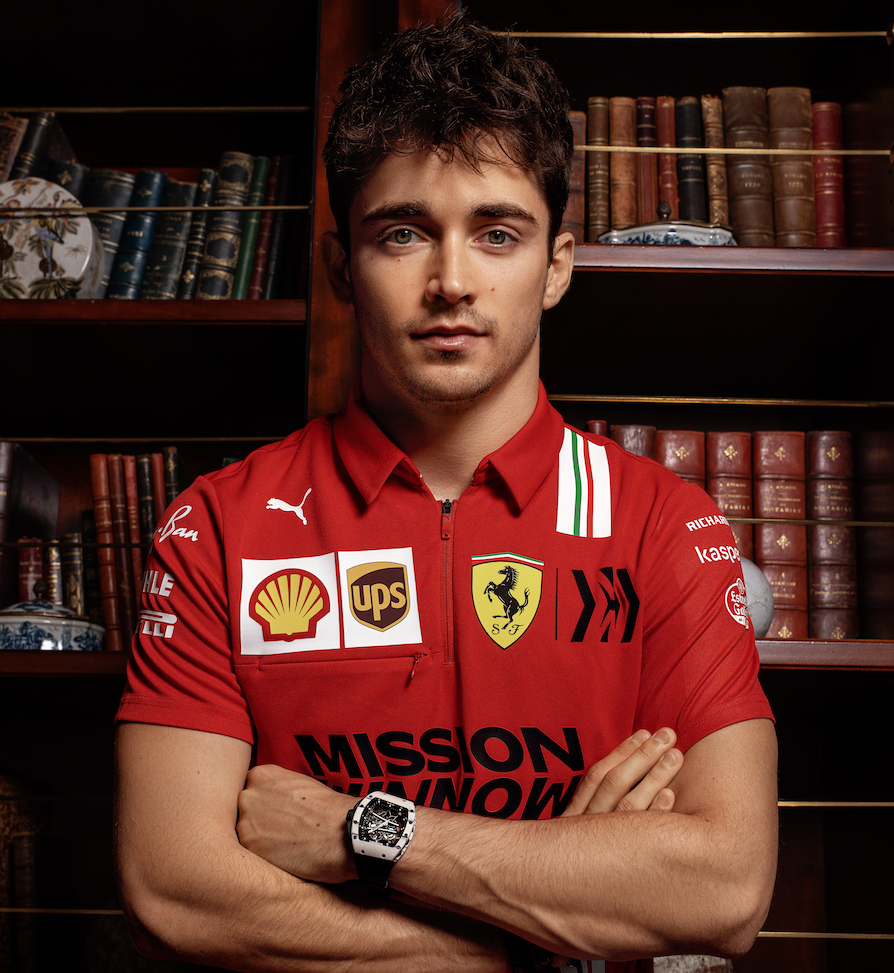
Leclerc (pictured in 2020) has partnered with Richard Mille since 2009.

Leclerc has been partnered with Swiss luxury watch company Richard Mille since 2009, which supported him through his kart racing and junior formulae career. He has also been sponsored by Bell Helmets throughout his career. He launched his own go-kart brand in 2019, as part of a collaboration with Birel ART. In 2020, Leclerc became an endorsement model for Italian fashion house Giorgio Armani. He has additionally held ambassadorship roles at APM Monaco, Bang & Olufsen, Celsius Holdings, Puma, and Chivas Regal. In April 2024, Leclerc launched an eponymous ice cream brand called LEC, a reference to his three-letter code on Formula One television graphics. He forayed into fashion design with a 2025 capsule collection in collaboration with Ferrari Style—Ferrari x Charles Leclerc—and released his own merchandise line, CL16, that November.

=== Philanthropy ===
Leclerc was named an ambassador of the Princess Charlene of Monaco Foundation in 2018, helping to promote the benefits of learning to swim. In April 2020, he won the Race for the World sim racing championship, raising over US$70,000 for the COVID-19 Solidarity Response Fund. The following month, he assisted the Red Cross of Monaco by delivering meals and transporting hospital equipment amidst the COVID-19 pandemic in Monaco. Leclerc auctioned the equipment he wore at the 2023 Monaco Grand Prix, raising €368,800 for victims of the Emilia-Romagna floods; his helmet sold for a record €306,000.

== Personal life ==
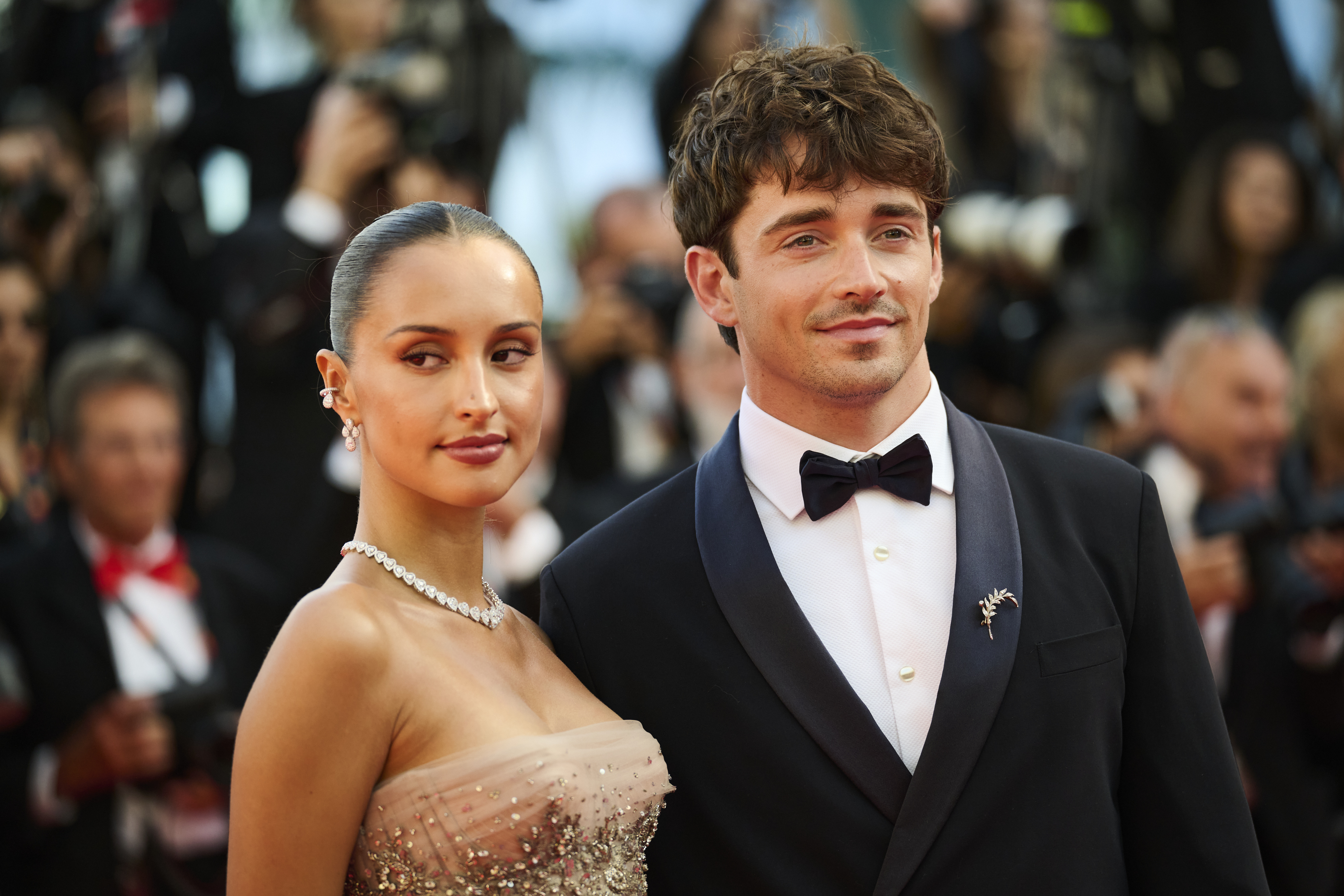
Leclerc and his wife, Alexandra, at the 2026 Cannes Film Festival

Leclerc is trilingual; he is fluent in French, Italian, and English. Outside of motor racing, he is interested in architecture, music, and fashion. He has released his own music on Spotify where he plays the piano. He chose 16 as his personal driver number in Formula One because the digits sum to his lucky number, 7, in addition to it also being his birth date—16 October; his first options, 7 and 10, were taken by Kimi Räikkönen and Pierre Gasly, respectively.

From 2019 to 2022, Leclerc was in a relationship with Monégasque architect and influencer Charlotte Siné, daughter of the then–director general of the Société des Bains de Mer de Monaco. He was previously in a four-year relationship with Italian model Giada Gianni. He began a relationship with French-born influencer Alexandra Saint Mleux—who worked as an art historian in La Condamine—in 2023. They announced their engagement in November 2025 and married in a private civil ceremony four months later in Monaco-Ville, driving away together in a 1957 Ferrari 250 TR, with a larger ceremony scheduled for 2027. In August 2026, the couple revealed that they were expecting their first child together. Their child, a daughter, was born in November 2026.

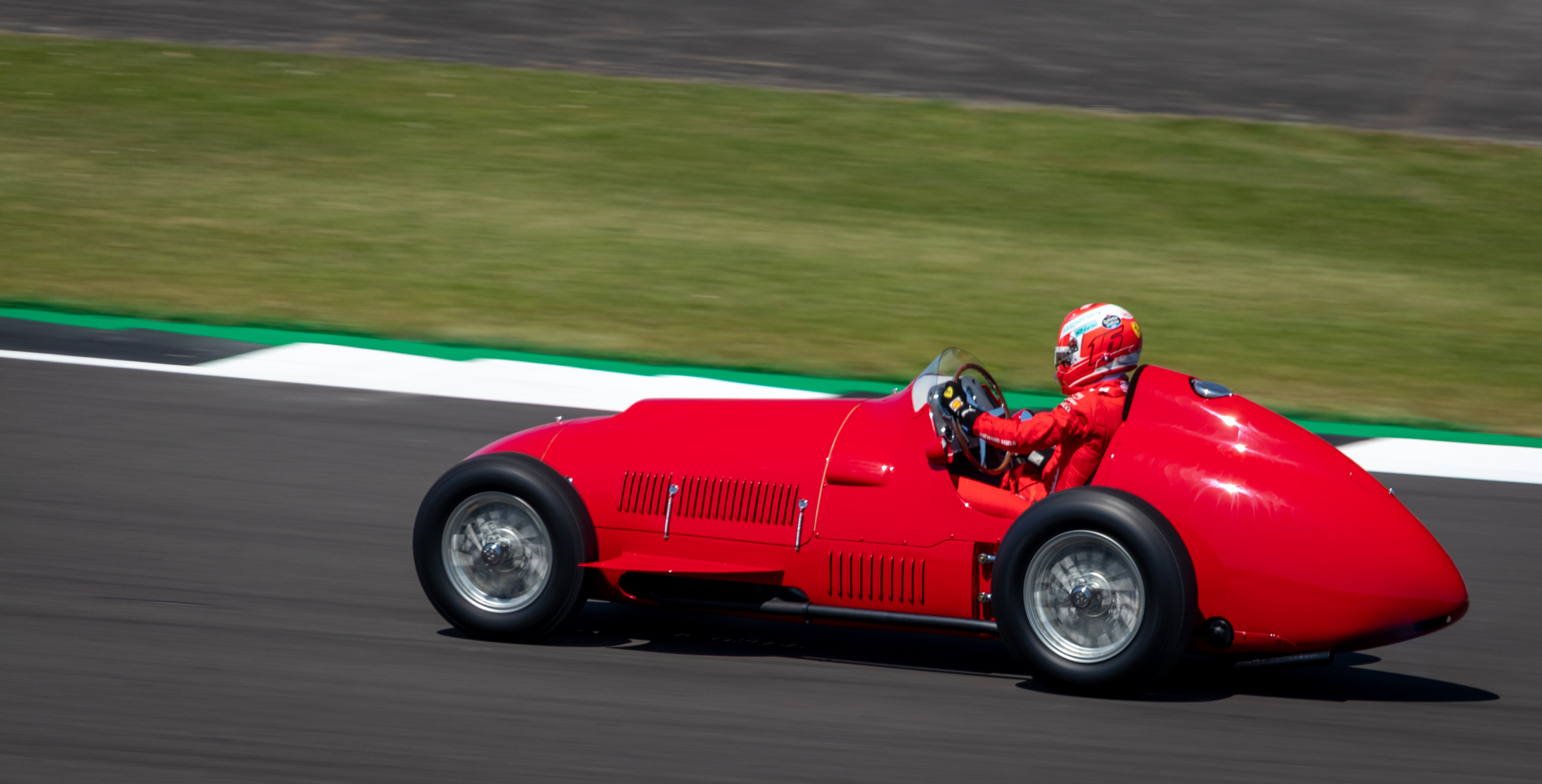
Leclerc driving the Ferrari 375 F1 at the 2021 British Grand Prix

Leclerc served as a torchbearer for the Monégasque leg ahead of the 2024 Summer Olympics, alongside Alexandra Coletti, Xiaoxin Yang, Rudy Rinaldi, Prince Albert II, and Princess Charlene. That year, he purchased a US$3.1 million condominium in Miami. He owns several Ferrari cars, including custom versions of the SF90 XX, Daytona SP3, and Purosangue, as well as the 275 GTB, SF90 Stradale, 488 Pista, and 812 Competizione. He also took delivery of a US$20 million, 102-foot (31 m) yacht from Riva at an exclusive ceremony with his wife in 2026. Whilst leading the World Drivers' Championship, he entered the Historic Grand Prix of Monaco in 2022, where he crashed a Ferrari 312B3—driven by Niki Lauda in 1974—at La Rascasse following a brake failure. He was awarded the Medal of Honour by the National Council of Monaco in 2020; the president of the National Council, Stéphane Valeri, stated it "could not have dreamed of a better recipient". Leclerc has been widely described as a national hero of Monaco, particularly following his victory at his home Grand Prix in 2024. (Note: Per several sources:)

== Awards and honours ==
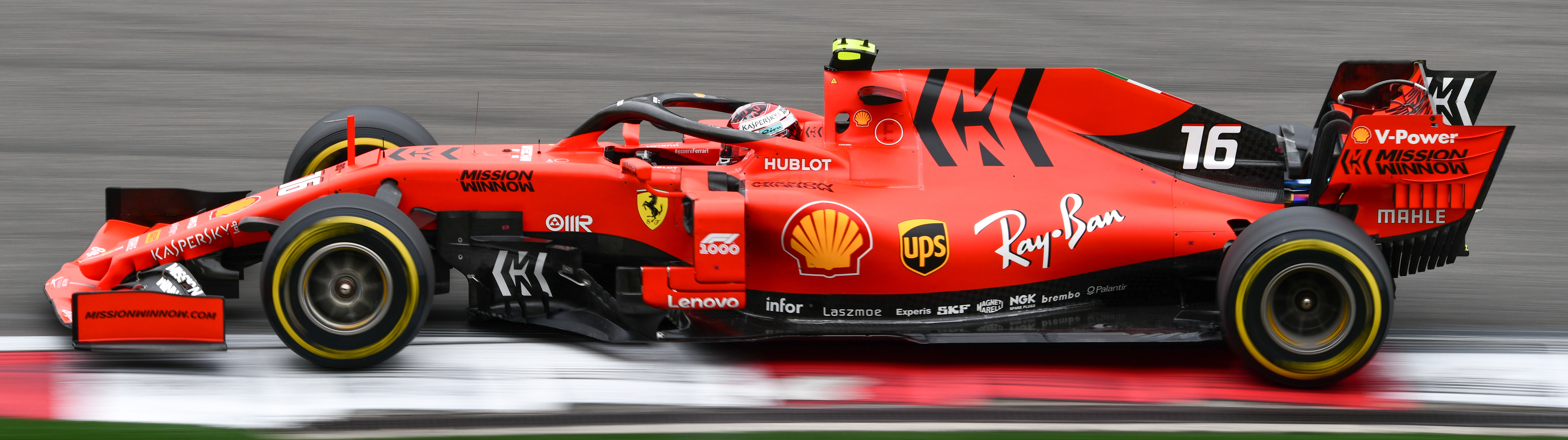
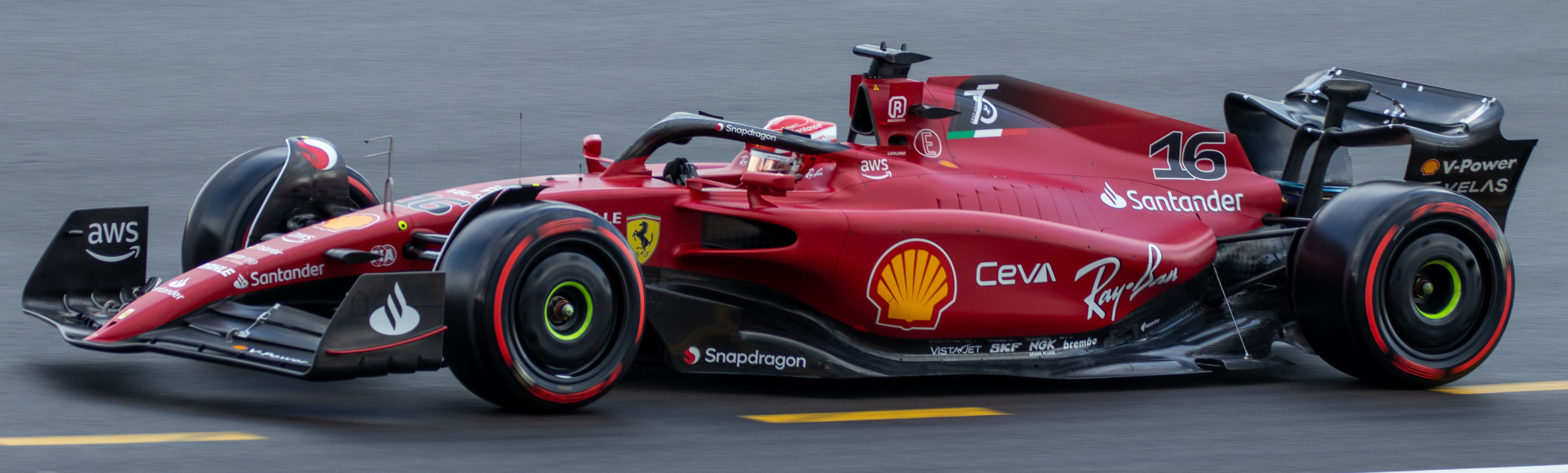
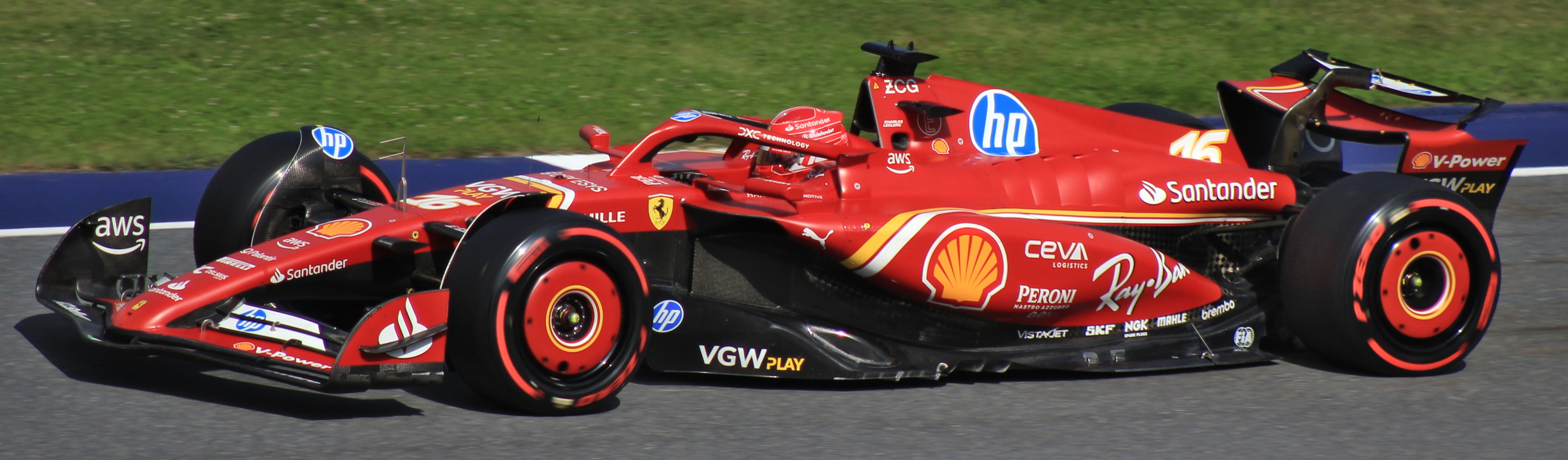
Leclerc's Grand Prix–winning cars from top-to-bottom: SF90 (2019), F1-75 (2022), SF-24 (2024), and SF-26 (2026)

=== Formula One ===
- Formula One World Drivers' Championship runner-up: 2022
- FIA Pole Trophy: 2019 (Note: The FIA Pole Trophy was only awarded from 2014 to 2019. Leclerc also achieved the most pole positions in 2022.)
- FIA Rookie of the Year: 2018
- Lorenzo Bandini Trophy: 2020
- Overtake Award: 2023

=== Other awards ===
- FIA Rookie of the Year: 2017
- Autosport Awards Rookie of the Year: 2017, 2018
- Confartigianato Motori Driver of the Year: 2020
- Confartigianato Motori Best Young Driver: 2018

=== Orders and special awards ===
- Monaco
  - Medal of Honour (2020)

== Karting record ==
=== Karting career summary ===
| Season | Series | Team | Position |
|---|---|---|---|
| 2005 | Championnat de France Regional PACA — Mini Kart | | 1st |
| 2005 | Coupe de France — Mini Kart | | 19th |
| 2006 | Championnat de France Regional PACA — Mini Kart | | 1st |
| 2006 | Coupe de France — Mini Kart | | 11th |
| 2007 | Championnat de France — Minime | | 22nd |
| 2007 | Championnat de France Regional PACA — Minime | | 2nd |
| 2007 | Trophée Claude Secq — Minime | | 1st |
| 2008 | Bridgestone Cup — Minime | | 5th |
| 2008 | Championnat de France — Minime | | 2nd |
| 2009 | Trophée de France — Cadet | | 11th |
| 2009 | Coupe de France — Cadet | | 4th |
| 2009 | Championnat de France — Cadet | | 1st |
| 2009 | Bridgestone Cup — Cadet | | 1st |
| 2009 | Championnat de la Ligue Rhône-Alpes — Cadet | | 1st |
| 2010 | South Garda Winter Cup — KF3 | Maranello Kart | 18th |
| 2010 | WSK Euro Series — KF3 | Maranello Kart | 28th |
| 2010 | CIK-FIA World Cup — KF3 | Sodikart | 29th |
| 2010 | CIK-FIA Academy Trophy | | 5th |
| 2010 | Monaco Kart Cup — KF3 | | 1st |
| 2010 | Grand Prix Open — KF3 | | 2nd |
| 2011 | South Garda Winter Cup — KF3 | Sodi Racing Team | 8th |
| 2011 | Rotax Max Euro Challenge — Junior | Sodi Racing Team | 43rd |
| 2011 | WSK Euro Series — KF3 | Sodi Racing Team | 23rd |
| 2011 | Grand Prix Open — KF3 | | 44th |
| 2011 | CIK-FIA World Cup — KF3 | Intrepid Driver Program | 1st |
| 2011 | WSK Master Series — KF3 | Intrepid Driver Program | 15th |
| 2011 | WSK Final Cup — KF3 | Intrepid Driver Program | 2nd |
| 2011 | CIK-FIA Academy Trophy | Hervé Leclerc | 1st |
| 2011 | Masters of Paris-Bercy — Junior | | 1st |
| 2012 | South Garda Winter Cup — KF2 | | 25th |
| 2012 | Grand Prix Open — KF2 | | 10th |
| 2012 | WSK Master Series — KF2 | ART Grand Prix | 20th |
| 2012 | Andrea Margutti Trophy — KF2 | ART Grand Prix | 7th |
| 2012 | CIK-FIA European Championship — KF2 | ART Grand Prix | 2nd |
| 2012 | WSK Euro Series — KF2 | ART Grand Prix | 1st |
| 2012 | CIK-FIA World Cup — KF2 | ART Grand Prix | 5th |
| 2012 | WSK Final Cup — KF2 | ART Grand Prix | 5th |
| 2012 | CIK-FIA U18 World Championship | Machac Racing | 2nd |
| 2012 | SKUSA SuperNationals — TaG Senior | ART Grand Prix America | 4th |
| 2013 | South Garda Winter Cup — KZ2 | ART Grand Prix | 1st |
| 2013 | WSK Euro Series — KZ1 | ART Grand Prix | 12th |
| 2013 | CIK-FIA European Championship — KZ | ART Grand Prix | 6th |
| 2013 | WSK Master Series — KZ2 | ART Grand Prix | 4th |
| 2013 | CIK-FIA World Championship — KZ | ART Grand Prix | 2nd |

=== Complete CIK-FIA results ===
==== Complete CIK-FIA Karting World Championship results ====
| Year | Entrant | Class | Circuit | QH | PF | F | Pos |
|---|---|---|---|---|---|---|---|
| 2010 | Sodikart | KF3† | (Portugal) Braga | 18th | 32nd | 29th | —N/a |
| 2011 | Intrepid Driver Program | KF3† | (Italy) Sarno | 3rd | 1st | 1st | —N/a |
| 2012 | ART Grand Prix | KF2† | (Spain) Zuera | 17th | 10th | 5th | —N/a |
| 2012 | Machac Racing | U18 | (Portugal) Braga | 10th | 7th | 2nd | 2nd |
| 2012 | Machac Racing | U18 | (France) Angerville | 2nd | 8th | 4th | 2nd |
| 2012 | Machac Racing | U18 | (Bahrain) Sakhir | 8th | 1st | 2nd | 2nd |
| 2013 | ART Grand Prix | KZ | (France) Varennes | 9th | 6th | 2nd | —N/a |

^{†} Class held as a Karting World Cup.

==== Complete CIK-FIA Karting European Championship results ====
(key) (Races in bold indicate pole position; races in italics indicate fastest lap)

| Year | Team | Class | 1 | 2 | 3 | 4 | Pos | Points |
|---|---|---|---|---|---|---|---|---|
| 2012 | ART Grand Prix | KF2 | WAC; 1; 1 | **WAC**; **2**; 8 | PFI; 1 Ret | PFI; 2; 7 | 2nd | 42 |
| 2013 | ART Grand Prix | KZ | WAC; 12 | GEN; 3 | | | 6th | 20 |

== Racing record ==
=== Racing career summary ===
| Season | Series | Team | Races | Wins | Poles | F/Laps | Podiums | Points | Position |
|---|---|---|---|---|---|---|---|---|---|
| 2014 | Formula Renault 2.0 Alps | Fortec Motorsports | 14 | 2 | 1 | 0 | 7 | 199 | 2nd |
| 2014 | Eurocup Formula Renault 2.0 | Fortec Motorsports | 6 | 0 | 0 | 0 | 3 | —N/a | NC† |
| 2015 | FIA Formula 3 European Championship | Van Amersfoort Racing | 33 | 4 | 3 | 5 | 13 | 363.5 | 4th |
| 2015 | Macau Grand Prix | Van Amersfoort Racing | 1 | 0 | 0 | 0 | 1 | —N/a | 2nd |
| 2016 | GP3 Series | ART Grand Prix | 18 | 3 | 4 | 4 | 8 | 202 | 1st |
| 2016 | Formula One | Scuderia Ferrari | Development driver | | | | | | |
| 2016 | Formula One | Haas F1 Team | Test driver | | | | | | |
| 2017 | FIA Formula 2 Championship | Prema Racing | 22 | 7 | 8 | 4 | 10 | 282 | 1st |
| 2017 | Formula One | Scuderia Ferrari | Test driver | | | | | | |
| 2017 | Formula One | Sauber F1 Team | Test driver | | | | | | |
| 2018 | Formula One | Alfa Romeo Sauber F1 Team | 21 | 0 | 0 | 0 | 0 | 39 | 13th |
| 2019 | Formula One | Scuderia Ferrari Mission Winnow | 21 | 2 | 7 | 4 | 10 | 264 | 4th |
| 2020 | Formula One | Scuderia Ferrari Mission Winnow | 17 | 0 | 0 | 0 | 2 | 98 | 8th |
| 2021 | Formula One | Scuderia Ferrari Mission Winnow | 22 | 0 | 2 | 0 | 1 | 159 | 7th |
| 2022 | Formula One | Scuderia Ferrari | 22 | 3 | 9 | 3 | 11 | 308 | 2nd |
| 2023 | Formula One | Scuderia Ferrari | 22 | 0 | 5 | 0 | 6 | 206 | 5th |
| 2024 | Formula One | Scuderia Ferrari | 24 | 3 | 3 | 3 | 13 | 356 | 3rd |
| 2025 | Formula One | Scuderia Ferrari HP | 24 | 0 | 1 | 1 | 7 | 242 | 5th |
| 2026 | Formula One | Scuderia Ferrari HP | 20 | 1 | 0 | 4 | 6 | 249* | 5th* |

^{†} As Leclerc was a guest driver, he was ineligible for championship points.
* Season still in progress.

=== Complete Formula Renault 2.0 Alps results ===
(key) (Races in bold indicate pole position; races in italics indicate fastest lap)

| Year | Entrant | 1 | 2 | 3 | 4 | 5 | 6 | 7 | 8 | 9 | 10 | 11 | 12 | 13 | 14 | Pos | Points |
|---|---|---|---|---|---|---|---|---|---|---|---|---|---|---|---|---|---|
| 2014 | Fortec Motorsports | IMO; 1 Ret | IMO; 2 Ret | PAU; 1; 6 | PAU; 2; 2 | RBR; 1; 4 | RBR; 2; 4 | SPA; 1; 3 | SPA; 2; 3 | MNZ; 1; 1 | **MNZ**; **2**; 1 | MUG; 1; 2 | MUG; 2; 2 | JER; 1; 6 | JER; 2; 7 | 2nd | 199 |

=== Complete Eurocup Formula Renault 2.0 results ===
(key) (Races in bold indicate pole position; races in italics indicate fastest lap)

| Year | Entrant | 1 | 2 | 3 | 4 | 5 | 6 | 7 | 8 | 9 | 10 | 11 | 12 | 13 | 14 | Pos | Points |
|---|---|---|---|---|---|---|---|---|---|---|---|---|---|---|---|---|---|
| 2014 | Fortec Motorsports | ALC; 1 | ALC; 2 | SPA; 1; 26 | SPA; 2; 30 | MSC; 1 | MSC; 2 | NÜR; 1; 5 | NÜR; 2; 2 | HUN; 1; 2 | HUN; 2; 2 | LEC; 1 | LEC; 2 | JER; 1 | JER; 2 | NC† | — |

^{†} As Leclerc was a guest driver, he was ineligible for championship points.

=== Complete FIA Formula 3 European Championship results ===
(key) (Races in bold indicate pole position; races in italics indicate fastest lap)

| Year | Entrant | Engine | 1 | 2 | 3 | 4 | 5 | 6 | 7 | 8 | 9 | 10 | 11 | 12 | 13 | 14 | 15 | 16 | 17 | 18 | 19 | 20 | 21 | 22 | 23 | 24 | 25 | 26 | 27 | 28 | 29 | 30 | 31 | 32 | 33 | Pos | Points |
|---|---|---|---|---|---|---|---|---|---|---|---|---|---|---|---|---|---|---|---|---|---|---|---|---|---|---|---|---|---|---|---|---|---|---|---|---|---|
| 2015 | Van Amersfoort Racing | Volkswagen | SIL; 1; 12 | **SIL**; **2**; 2 | **SIL**; **3**; 1 | HOC; 1; 3 | HOC; 2; 2 | HOC; 3; 1 | PAU; 1; 3 | PAU; 2; 2 | PAU; 3; 3 | MNZ; 1; 5 | MNZ; 2 Ret | MNZ; 3; 3 | SPA; 1; 1 | SPA; 2; 6 | SPA; 3; 2 | **NOR**; **1**; 1 | NOR; 2; 3 | NOR; 3; 4 | ZAN; 1; 5 | ZAN; 2 Ret | ZAN; 3; 10 | RBR; 1; 6 | RBR; 2; 4 | RBR; 3; 6 | ALG; 1; 6 | ALG; 2; 7 | ALG; 3; 7 | NÜR; 1; 4 | NÜR; 2; 5 | NÜR; 3; 5 | HOC; 1; 8 | HOC; 2; 10 | HOC; 3; 21 | 4th | 363.5 |

=== Complete Macau Grand Prix results ===
| Year | Entrant | Car | Qualifying | Quali race | Main race |
|---|---|---|---|---|---|
| 2015 | (Netherlands) Van Amersfoort Racing | Dallara F316 | 3rd | 2nd | 2nd |

=== Complete GP3 Series results ===
(key) (Races in bold indicate pole position; races in italics indicate points for the fastest lap of the top-10 finishers)

| Year | Entrant | 1 | 2 | 3 | 4 | 5 | 6 | 7 | 8 | 9 | 10 | 11 | 12 | 13 | 14 | 15 | 16 | 17 | 18 | Pos | Points |
|---|---|---|---|---|---|---|---|---|---|---|---|---|---|---|---|---|---|---|---|---|---|
| 2016 | ART Grand Prix | CAT; FEA; 1 | CAT; SPR; 9 | **RBR**; **FEA**; 1 | RBR; SPR; Ret | SIL; FEA; 2 | SIL; SPR; 3 | HUN; FEA; 6 | HUN; SPR; 3 | HOC; FEA; 5 | HOC; SPR; 3 | **SPA**; **FEA**; 1 | SPA; SPR; 6 | **MNZ**; **FEA**; 4 | MNZ; SPR; Ret | **SEP**; **FEA**; 3 | SEP; SPR; 5 | YMC; FEA; Ret | YMC; SPR; 9 | 1st | 202 |

=== Complete FIA Formula 2 Championship results ===
(key) (Races in bold indicate pole position; races in italics indicate points for the fastest lap of the top-10 finishers)

| Year | Entrant | 1 | 2 | 3 | 4 | 5 | 6 | 7 | 8 | 9 | 10 | 11 | 12 | 13 | 14 | 15 | 16 | 17 | 18 | 19 | 20 | 21 | 22 | Pos | Points |
|---|---|---|---|---|---|---|---|---|---|---|---|---|---|---|---|---|---|---|---|---|---|---|---|---|---|
| 2017 | Prema Racing | **BHR**; **FEA**; 3 | BHR; SPR; 1 | **CAT**; **FEA**; 1 | CAT; SPR; 4 | **MON**; **FEA**; Ret | MON; SPR; 18† | **BAK**; **FEA**; 1 | BAK; SPR; 2 | **RBR**; **FEA**; 1 | RBR; SPR; Ret | **SIL**; **FEA**; 1 | SIL; SPR; 5 | HUN; FEA; 4 | HUN; SPR; 4 | **SPA**; **FEA**; DSQ | SPA; SPR; 5 | MNZ; FEA; 17 | MNZ; SPR; 9 | **JER**; **FEA**; 1 | JER; SPR; 7 | YMC; FEA; 2 | YMC; SPR; 1 | 1st | 282 |

^{†} Did not finish, but was classified as he had completed more than 90% of the race distance.

=== Complete Formula One results ===
(key) (Races in bold indicate pole position; races in italics indicate fastest lap; ^{superscript} indicates point-scoring sprint position)

| Year | Entrant | Chassis | Engine | 1 | 2 | 3 | 4 | 5 | 6 | 7 | 8 | 9 | 10 | 11 | 12 | 13 | 14 | 15 | 16 | 17 | 18 | 19 | 20 | 21 | 22 | 23 | 24 | WDC | Points |
|---|---|---|---|---|---|---|---|---|---|---|---|---|---|---|---|---|---|---|---|---|---|---|---|---|---|---|---|---|---|
| 2016 | Haas F1 Team | Haas VF-16 | Ferrari 061 1.6 V6 t | AUS | BHR | CHN | RUS | ESP | MON | CAN | EUR | AUT | GBR; TD | HUN; TD | GER; TD | BEL | ITA | SIN | MAL | JPN | USA | MEX | BRA; TD | ABU | | | | — | — |
| 2017 | Sauber F1 Team | Sauber C36 | Ferrari 061 1.6 V6 t | AUS | CHN | BHR | RUS | ESP | MON | CAN | AZE | AUT | GBR | HUN | BEL | ITA | SIN | MAL; TD | JPN | USA; TD | MEX; TD | BRA; TD | ABU | | | | | — | — |
| 2018 | Alfa Romeo Sauber F1 Team | Sauber C37 | Ferrari 062 EVO 1.6 V6 t | AUS; 13 | BHR; 12 | CHN; 19 | AZE; 6 | ESP; 10 | MON; 18† | CAN; 10 | FRA; 10 | AUT; 9 | GBR; Ret | GER; 15 | HUN; Ret | BEL; Ret | ITA; 11 | SIN; 9 | RUS; 7 | JPN; Ret | USA; Ret | MEX; 7 | BRA; 7 | ABU; 7 | | | | 13th | 39 |
| 2019 | Scuderia Ferrari Mission Winnow | Ferrari SF90 | Ferrari 064 1.6 V6 t | AUS; 5 | **BHR**; 3 | CHN; 5 | AZE; 5 | ESP; 5 | MON; Ret | CAN; 3 | FRA; 3 | **AUT**; 2 | GBR; 3 | GER; Ret | HUN; 4 | **BEL**; 1 | **ITA**; 1 | **SIN**; 2 | **RUS**; 3 | JPN; 6 | **MEX**; 4 | USA; 4 | BRA; 18† | ABU; 3 | | | | 4th | 264 |
| 2020 | Scuderia Ferrari Mission Winnow | Ferrari SF1000 | Ferrari 065 1.6 V6 t | AUT; 2 | STY; Ret | HUN; 11 | GBR; 3 | 70A; 4 | ESP; Ret | BEL; 14 | ITA; Ret | TUS; 8 | RUS; 6 | EIF; 7 | POR; 4 | EMI; 5 | TUR; 4 | BHR; 10 | SKH; Ret | ABU; 13 | | | | | | | | 8th | 98 |
| 2021 | Scuderia Ferrari Mission Winnow | Ferrari SF21 | Ferrari 065/6 1.6 V6 t | BHR; 6 | EMI; 4 | POR; 6 | ESP; 4 | **MON**; DNS | **AZE**; 4 | FRA; 16 | STY; 7 | AUT; 8 | GBR; 2 | HUN; Ret | BEL; 8‡ | NED; 5 | ITA; 4 | RUS; 15 | TUR; 4 | USA; 4 | MXC; 5 | SAP; 5 | QAT; 8 | SAU; 7 | ABU; 10 | | | 7th | 159 |
| 2022 | Scuderia Ferrari | Ferrari F1-75 | Ferrari 066/7 1.6 V6 t | **BHR**; 1 | SAU; 2 | **AUS**; 1 | EMI; 6^{2} | **MIA**; 2 | **ESP**; Ret | **MON**; 4 | **AZE**; Ret | CAN; 5 | GBR; 4 | AUT; 1^{2} | **FRA**; Ret | HUN; 6 | BEL; 6 | NED; 3 | **ITA**; 2 | **SIN**; 2 | JPN; 3 | USA; 3 | MXC; 6 | SAP; 4^{6} | ABU; 2 | | | 2nd | 308 |
| 2023 | Scuderia Ferrari | Ferrari SF-23 | Ferrari 066/10 1.6 V6 t | BHR; Ret | SAU; 7 | AUS; Ret | **AZE**; 3^{2} | MIA; 7 | MON; 6 | ESP; 11 | CAN; 4 | AUT; 2 | GBR; 9 | HUN; 7 | **BEL**; 3^{5} | NED; Ret | ITA; 4 | SIN; 4 | JPN; 4 | QAT; 5 | **USA**; DSQ^{3} | **MXC**; 3 | SAP; DNS^{5} | **LVG**; 2 | ABU; 2 | | | 5th | 206 |
| 2024 | Scuderia Ferrari | Ferrari SF-24 | Ferrari 066/12 1.6 V6 t | BHR; 4 | SAU; 3 | AUS; 2 | JPN; 4 | CHN; 4^{4} | MIA; 3^{2} | EMI; 3 | **MON**; 1 | CAN; Ret | ESP; 5 | AUT; 11^{7} | GBR; 14 | HUN; 4 | **BEL**; 3 | NED; 3 | ITA; 1 | **AZE**; 2 | SIN; 5 | USA; 1^{4} | MXC; 3 | SAP; 5^{3} | LVG; 4 | QAT; 2^{5} | ABU; 3 | 3rd | 356 |
| 2025 | Scuderia Ferrari HP | Ferrari SF-25 | Ferrari 066/15 1.6 V6 t | AUS; 8 | CHN; DSQ^{5} | JPN; 4 | BHR; 4 | SAU; 3 | MIA; 7 | EMI; 6 | MON; 2 | ESP; 3 | CAN; 5 | AUT; 3 | GBR; 14 | BEL; 3^{4} | **HUN**; 4 | NED; Ret | ITA; 4 | AZE; 9 | SIN; 6 | USA; 3^{5} | MXC; 2 | SAP; Ret^{5} | LVG; 4 | QAT; 8 | ABU; 4 | 5th | 242 |
| 2026 | Scuderia Ferrari HP | Ferrari SF-26 | Ferrari 067/6 1.6 V6 t | AUS; 3 | CHN; 4^{2} | JPN; 3 | MIA; 8^{3} | CAN; 4^{5} | MON; Ret | BCN; 15† | AUT; 8 | GBR; 1^{5} | BEL; 2 | HUN; 4 | NED; 5^{2} | ITA; Ret | ESP; 4 | AZE; 4 | BHR; 4 | SIN; 2^{3} | USA; 2 | MXC; 4 | SAP; 8 | LVG | QAT | ABU | | 5th* | 249* |

^{†} Did not finish, but was classified as he had completed more than 90% of the race distance.
^{‡} Half points awarded as less than 75% of race distance was completed.
* Season still in progress.

== Filmography ==
=== Film ===
| Year | Title | Role | Notes | Ref |
|---|---|---|---|---|
| 2020 | Le Grand Rendez-vous | Himself | Silent, short film; lead role | |
| 2022 | Lightyear | Additional voice | Italian-language version | |
| 2025 | F1 | Himself | Cameo appearance | |

=== Television ===
| Year | Title | Role | Notes | Ref |
|---|---|---|---|---|
| 2019–2026 | Formula 1: Drive to Survive | Himself | Documentary; recurring role (78 episodes) | |
| 2021 | F2: Chasing the Dream | Himself | Episode: "Return to Spa" | |
| 2023 | En Aparté | Himself | Episode: "Charles Leclerc" | |
| 2024 | Charles Leclerc – Supersonique | Himself | Documentary; used the call sign Perceval | |

== Discography ==
=== Extended plays ===
| Title | Details | Peak chart positions | | | |
| Title | Details | GER | SWI | US Classic | US CC |
|---|---|---|---|---|---|
| Dreamers (with Sofiane Pamart) | Released: 16 February 2024; Label: Verdigris, 88 Touches; Formats: Physical, digital download, streaming | 12 | 92 | 2 | 1 |

=== Singles ===
| Title | Year | Peak chart positions | | Album or EP |
| Title | Year | UK Down. | UK Sales | Album or EP |
|---|---|---|---|---|
| "AUS23 (1:1)" | 2023 | 58 | 87 | Non-album singles |
| "MIA23 (1:2)" | 2023 | — | — | Non-album singles |
| "MON23 (1:3)" | 2023 | — | — | Non-album singles |
| "MC24 (1:4)" | 2025 | — | — | Non-album singles |
| "SIN24 (1:5)" | 2025 | — | — | Non-album singles |
"—" denotes a recording that did not chart or was not released in that territory.

=== Other charted songs ===
| Title | Year | Peak chart positions | | Album or EP |
| Title | Year | UK Phys. | UK Vinyl | Album or EP |
|---|---|---|---|---|
| "Focus" (with Sofiane Pamart) | 2024 | 17 | 21 | Dreamers |

== Notes ==
Sporting positions
| Preceded by Antonio Fuoco | Formula Renault 2.0 Alps; Junior Champion; 2014 | Succeeded by Matevos Isaakyan |
| Preceded by Esteban Ocon | FIA Formula 3 European Championship; Rookie Champion; 2015 | Succeeded by Joel Eriksson |
| Preceded by Esteban Ocon | GP3 Series; Champion; 2016 | Succeeded by George Russell |
| Preceded by Pierre Gasly (GP2 Series) | FIA Formula 2 Championship; Champion; 2017 | Succeeded by George Russell |
Awards
| Preceded by Kevin Hansen | FIA Rookie of the Year; 2017–2018 | Succeeded by Alexander Albon |
| Preceded by Pascal Wehrlein | Autosport Awards; Rookie of the Year; 2017–2018 | Succeeded by Alexander Albon |
| Preceded by Lewis Hamilton | FIA Pole Trophy; 2019 | Succeeded by Abolished |
| Preceded by Antonio Giovinazzi | Lorenzo Bandini Trophy; 2020 | Succeeded by Stefano Domenicali; Massimo Rivola |
| Preceded by Sebastian Vettel | Overtake Award; 2023 | Succeeded by Franco Colapinto |
