= Human nature (disambiguation) =

Human nature refers to the distinguishing characteristics, including ways of thinking, feeling and acting, that humans tend to have naturally.

Human nature may also refer to:

== Arts, entertainment, and media ==
=== Literature ===
- Human Nature (novel), a 1995 Doctor Who novel by writer Paul Cornell
- Human Nature, notebooks of paediatrician and psychoanalyst Donald Winnicott
- A Treatise of Human Nature (1738), by philosopher David Hume, sometimes abbreviated as "Hume's Human Nature"
- On Human Nature, a book by Harvard biologist E. O. Wilson
- Part of The Elements of Law, Natural and Politic (1640) by philosopher Thomas Hobbes

=== Music ===
- Human Nature (band), an Australian vocal group formed in 1989

==== Albums ====
- Human Nature (America album), 1998
- Human Nature (Human Nature album), 2000
- Human Nature (Harem Scarem album), 2006
- Human Nature (Hardline album), 2016
- Human Nature (Herb Alpert album), 2016
- Human Nature, an upcoming album by Swae Lee
- Human. :II: Nature. by Nightwish, 2020

==== Songs ====
- "Human Nature" (Michael Jackson song), 1982
- "Human Nature" (Madonna song), 1995
- "Human Nature" (Gary Clail On-U Sound System song), 1991
- "Human Nature", a song by Sevdaliza from The Calling (2018) and Shabrang (2020)
- "Human Nature", a song by Adema

=== Other arts, entertainment, and media ===
- Human Nature (2001 film), a comedy-drama film starring Patricia Arquette, Rhys Ifans and Tim Robbins
- Human Nature (2019 film), a documentary film
- "Human Nature" (Doctor Who), a 2007 Doctor Who episode by Paul Cornell based on the novel
- Human Nature (journal), an academic journal published by Springer Science+Business Media

== Other uses ==
- Human Nature (brand), a Philippine personal care products brand
- Chomsky–Foucault debate, on human nature
