= Marilyn Monroe (disambiguation) =

Marilyn Monroe (1926–1962) was an American actress.

Marilyn Monroe may also refer to:

- "Marilyn Monroe" (Nicki Minaj song)
- "Marilyn Monroe" (Pharrell Williams song)
- "Marilyn Monroe", a 2007 song by Dala from Who Do You Think You Are
- "Marilyn Monroe", a 2011 song by Brianna Perry
- "Marilyn Monroe", by 2017 song by Sevdaliza, from ISON
- "Marilyn Monroe", a 2020 song by Astrid S from Leave It Beautiful
- "Marilyn Monroe", a song by Phoebe Legere
- "Marilyn Monroe", a song from Blood Brothers
- Rosa 'Marilyn Monroe', a rose cultivar
- Madhubala (1933–1969), Indian actress, known as the "Marilyn Monroe of Bollywood"

== See also ==
- Marilyn (1963 film) or The Marilyn Monroe Story, a documentary film
