= Erik Rhodes =

Erik Rhodes may refer to:

- Erik Rhodes (actor, born 1906) (1906–1990), American actor and Broadway singer
- Erik Rhodes (pornographic actor) (1982–2012), American gay pornographic film actor
