= AHFA =

AHFA may refer to:

- American Home Furnishings Alliance
- American Health Foods Association
