= Heroina (Sevdaliza album) =

Studio album by Sevdaliza
- Released: 31 October 2025
- Recorded: 2023–2025
- Genres: Latin pop; neoperreo; reggaeton; worldbeat
- Length: 34:02
- Languages: English; Portuguese; Spanish; French
- Labels: Broke; Create Music Group
- Producers: Sevdaliza; Mathias Janmaat; Adam Vadel; REMED; Mucky; FS Green; Dave Nunes; Raf Rubens; Frankie Scoca

Sevdaliza chronology
Raving Dahlia (2022)	Heroina (2025)

Singles from Heroina
- 1. "Ride or Die, Pt. 2" Released: 18 April 2024; 2. "Alibi" Released: 28 June 2024; 3. "No Me Cansaré" Released: 18 October 2024; 4. "Maria Magdalena" Released: 7 March 2025; 5. "Heroina" Released: 9 May 2025; 6. "Messiah" Released: 27 June 2025; 7. "Strong Because You Are" Released: 19 September 2025; 8. "Stripper" Released: 23 October 2025

Heroina (stylized in all caps) is the third studio album by Iranian-Dutch singer-songwriter Sevdaliza. It was released on 31 October 2025, by Broke under Create Music Group. A sonic departure for Sevdaliza, Heroina is a mainstream pop album influenced by Latin music, in contrast to the darker trip hop and alternative R&B sound of her previous releases. Lyrically, the record explores themes of female empowerment, love and lust through a blend of religious and provocative imagery that portrays femininity as "both sacred and transgressive".

The album was supported by the release of eight singles, including "Ride or Die, Pt. 2" and "Alibi", which became viral successes across digital platforms and went on to become the biggest hits of Sevdaliza's career to date. It includes collaborations with Villano Antillano, Tokischa, Pabllo Vittar, Yseult, Karol G, Kenia Os, Irmãs de Pau, La Joaqui and Eartheater.

Critical reception to the album was mixed, with some reviewers praising its accessibility and fusion of pop and global sounds, while others critiqued Sevdaliza’s shift toward mainstream genres and questioned the artistic impact of her stylistic pivot.

== Background ==
Following the release of her 2020 album Shabrang and her 2022 EP Raving Dahlia, Sevdaliza began experimenting with a wider range of styles through a series of standalone singles. These included the reggaeton-influenced "Ride or Die" with Villano Antillano, the hardstyle-inspired "Nothing Lasts Forever" with Grimes, the ballad "Who Are You Running From", and the "sonorous bossa-meets-Arabesque affair" track "Good Torture" with Elyanna.

Among these releases, "Ride or Die" in particular gained significant traction online, prompting Sevdaliza to release a "Part 2" remix featuring Dominican rapper Tokischa. That version went viral across digital platforms, and its urbano-leaning sound and strong Latin music influences went on to shape the musical direction of Heroina.

== Style and themes ==
"Heroina is a global sound, an embrace of diversity, a symbol of unity because no matter where you come from, who you love, how you identify, or what you believe, a hero rages within you."

— Sevdaliza introducing the themes of Heroina

Unlike the trip hop and alternative R&B genres of her previous releases, Heroina is a mainstream pop album influenced by Latin music styles such as neoperreo and reggaeton. The album also incorporates elements of worldbeat, alongside rhythmic influences from Brazilian funk and melodic traits associated with alternative pop. Sevdaliza described the album as a "global sound, an embrace of diversity, a symbol of unity".

Lyrically, Heroina centers on themes of womanhood, desire, unconditional love, and freedom, presenting them through a symbolic framework heavily informed by religious and provocative imagery. References to figures such as the messiah and Mary Magdalene are used to recast traditional narratives of faith, lust, and redemption from a feminine perspective.

=== Songs ===
The title track "Heroina" is a neoperreo song that celebrates female power through references to divine and mythological figures such as Anahita, Saraswati, and Aphrodite. Both the song and its music video drew comparisons to the work of Venezuelan artist Arca, leading to public criticism from Arca herself and a brief online dispute between the two artists, which generated online controversy. "Alibi" is an operatic-styled murder ballad that blends club-oriented alternative pop with a range of Latin and Afro-Caribbean rhythms, including funk carioca, reggaeton, and bullerengue. The chorus is constructed around a sample of "Rosa" by Colombian musician Magín Díaz, a song also popularized by Carlos Vives and Totó la Momposina and derived from the Cuban song "Rosa, qué linda eres". Upon release, "Alibi" became a viral hit across digital platforms.

"Ride or Die, pt. 2" was described as a "surrealist reggaeton track" that lies "a complex narrative that explores themes of loyalty, sacrifice, and unwavering commitment". It also includes neoperreo and hyperpop influences. Its first part, released in 2023, was not included on the main tracklist of Heroina. "No Me Cansare" is a reggaeton track dedicated with themes of "healthy and unconditional love". It features guest vocals by Colombian singer Karol G and the music video was filmed on Rio de Janeiro, following Sevdaliza's appearance on Karol G's set on Rock in Rio X. The song earned Sevdaliza her first Latin radio top ten.

"Stripper" features guest vocals by Mexican singer Kenia Os and is build on "haunting synths and driving reggaeton percussion". The song originally included guest vocals by Colombian singer Feid; however, his verse does not appear on the album version of Heroina, despite being performed during several live renditions of the track.

== Promotion ==
The promotional cycle for Heroina was an extensive campaign that lasted over a year. Eight out of the thirteen songs of the tracklist were released as singles prior to the album's release. Throughout 2025, Sevdaliza also performed on a number of gigs, such as Kalorama in Portugal and Sziget Festival in Hungary.

In August 2025, her scheduled performance at the Music Fest with Coca-Cola in Armenia was cancelled following significant public backlash, particularly over a music video for the single "Messiah" that features provocative uses of Christian religious imagery. Organisers announced that she would no longer appear on the festival lineup after hundreds of comments on social media and pressure from religious groups criticised her as "disrespectful to Christian values", describing her inclusion as "inappropriate" for what is considered a "deeply religious country".

== Critical reception ==
Professional ratings
Review scores
Source	Rating
Jenesaispop	2/5 stars
Ondarock	4.5/10

Early critical reception to Heroina has been mixed.

Jem Aswad, executive editor for music of Variety, has listed it as a top 10 album of the year 2025, noting that previous albums were "compelling but so esoteric to be a bit unapproachable" while Heroina "is much more inviting". German public radio channel COSMO selected Heroina as its "Album of the Week", praising its fusion of contemporary reggaeton with politically charged, collaborative storytelling that positions Sevdaliza and her featured guests as united voices against patriarchy. Vogue Adria's feature on Sevdaliza, published ahead of the album, framed Heroina as the culmination of her long-standing interest in body politics, authenticity and spiritual exploration, describing the listening experience as "transcendental" and noting how the album moves from viral hits to more ethereal, introspective tracks.

In a negative review, Fernando García for Spanish music website Jenesaispop gave the album a 3.5/10 rating, deploring Sevdaliza's stylistic pivot toward Latin pop and reggaeton as a "victory of the streaming algorithm over artistic integrity", concluding "there is no trace of Sevdaliza" and calling the album "a disaster of stratospheric proportions". Italian online magazine Ondarock assigned in its review written by Damiano Pandolfini a 4.5/10 rating, with the writer opining that he was aware of the fact Sevdaliza took her art seriously, but that in order to venture well into styles of Latin music it was necessary for her to "loosen [her] shoulders, crack a smile and get overwhelmed by curiosity while maintaining a personal footing, something that here is tremendously lacking". He thought some tracks were bogged down by generic tropes, others got simply lost in poor songwriting choices, and others again felt out of place, but at least they gave the album some of its best moments.

== Track listing ==
Heroina track listing
No.	Title	Length
1.	"Intro"	1:18
2.	"On My Own"	2:36
3.	"Heroina (with La Joaqui)"	2:23
4.	"Alibi (with Pabllo Vittar and Yseult)"	2:41
5.	"Ride or Die, Pt. 2 (with Villano Antillano and Tokischa)"	2:38
6.	"Messiah"	2:56
7.	"No me cansare (with Karol G)"	2:42
8.	"Stripper (with Kenia OS)"	2:46
9.	"Maria Magdalena (with Irmãs da Pau)"	2:36
10.	"Oxytocina"	2:46
11.	"Strong Because You Are"	2:40
12.	"Postergirl"	2:48
13.	"Angel (with Eartheater)"	3:06
Total length:		34:00

=== Samples and interpolations ===
- "On My Own" contains elements of "Fani bu dünya" (2024), written by Muhabbet, Tugay Tanriseven and Bektas Öksüz, and performed by Muhabbet.
- "Alibi" contains a sample of "Rosa" (2017), written by Irene Martinez, and performed by Magín Díaz, Carlos Vives and Totó la Momposina.
- "Maria Magdalena" interpolates Tetris theme, which is based on "Korobeiniki" (1861), written and performed by Nikolay Nekrasov, "São Paulo" (2024), written by The Weeknd, Anitta and Tati Quebra Barraco performed by The Weeknd and Anitta, and "Quem É" (2014), written and performed by MC Daleste and Dj Batata.
