= Man at Bath =

- Theatrical release poster
- Directed by: Christophe Honoré
- Written by: Christophe Honoré
- Produced by: Justin Taurand
- Starring: François Sagat; Chiara Mastroianni
- Cinematography: David Chizallet
- Edited by: Chantal Hymans
- Release dates: 7 August 2010 (Locarno); 22 September 2010 (France)
- Running time: 72 minutes
- Country: France
- Language: French

Man at Bath (French: Homme au bain) is a 2010 French film by Christophe Honoré starring François Sagat and Chiara Mastroianni. The film premiered in competition at Locarno International Film Festival in Switzerland in 2010 and was released in cinemas on 22 September 2010.

This is gay pornographic actor François Sagat's second major role in general release non-pornographic film as Emmanuel after his role in L.A. Zombie. Director Christopher Honoré told French gay website Yagg.com that he was interested in Sagat because he "redefines the notion of masculinity". Sagat was the only actor to feature in two competition entries during the festival.

== Plot ==
Right before departing to New York City to promote his latest collaborations, Omar (Omar Ben Sellem) experiences yet another impulsive fit from his boyfriend Emmanuel (François Sagat), resulting in rape. Resentful, Omar demands Emmanuel leave his flat in Gennevilliers, a suburb of Paris, before his return. He leaves and the two set out to live a separate series of vignettes depicting the ways the former lovers mourn for each other.

Being a lustful aspiring filmmaker, Omar sees touring upper New York as an opportunity to finally forget Emmanuel, indulging instead in disjointed recordings of his travel. Soon after, his camera work is centered on Dustin (Dustin Segura-Suarez), a young college student who is on vacation from Canada. Omar eagerly befriends and later seduces Dustin, openly portraying their desire for each other on film with an amateurish academic intent. In a matter of days, the artistic intentions in Omar's home movie devolve into a bisexual experience including Omar's professor.

Back in Paris, an animalistic Emmanuel--used to taking pride in the universal praise for his body--is left broke and in denial. He shelters in Omar's place, living in as carefree a manner as he can muster. Emmanuel goes from demanding unsolicited attentions from an upstairs neighbor who also is one of his sex work clients (Dennis Cooper) to hosting sexual encounters with Omar's acquaintances. All without avoiding his growing yearning for the better days with his ex, not even after luring Omar's look-alike (Sebastian D'Azeglio) back into the apartment. After an intermission in which Emmanuel is confronted with his own collapsing lack of emotionality, he clumsily refuses the advances of an underage boy who claims to be in need (Andréas Leflamand), nor engages in a bisexual threesome in exchange for a tip he reluctantly accepts from a successful old friend (Kate Moran). The next day, Emmanuel begrudgingly succumbs to the advances from a teenager (Rabah Zahi) and uses the opportunity to sexually lash out on the boy. Finally, shortly before Omar's return, Emmanuel cries over the improvised mural he started days earlier on one of the walls in the apartment.

Not long after, Omar returns to his apartment, stopping to contemplate the finished mural drawn by Emmanuel, who is nowhere to be seen.

== Cast ==
- François Sagat as Emmanuel
- Chiara Mastroianni as Actress
- Rabah Zahi as Rabah
- Omar Ben Sellem as Omar
- Kate Moran as Kate
- Lahcen el Mazouzi as Hicham
- Andréas Leflamand as Andréas
- Ronald Piwele as Ronald
- Sebastian D'Azeglio as Man with a moustache
- Sébastien Pouderoux as Kate's fiancé
- Dennis Cooper as Robin
- Dustin Segura-Suarez
