= Raving Dahlia =

EP by Sevdaliza
- Released: 25 February 2022
- Genres: Art pop; alternative R&B; trip hop
- Length: 26:10
- Label: Twisted Elegance

Sevdaliza chronology
Shabrang (2020)	Raving Dahlia (2022)	Heroina (2025)

Singles from Raving Dahlia
- 1. "Oh My God (Sleepnet X Sevdaliza Remix)" Released: 21 October 2021; 2. "The Great Hope Design" Released: 24 November 2021; 3. "High Alone" Released: 19 January 2022; 4. "Everything Is Everything" Released: 3 March 2022

Raving Dahlia is the fourth extended play by Dutch-Iranian artist Sevdaliza. It was released 25 February 2022 by Twisted Elegance. The EP is titled after Sevdaliza's daughter, and is written about the unrealistic standards and expectations society has attempted to put onto women.

== Background and release ==
Sevdaliza released her second studio album, Shabrang, in 2020. On 9 October 2021, she broadcast a short film titled "Chapter 1: Genesis" on YouTube for 48 hours only. She titled the short film as "A New Life - The Unravelling".

The next day on 8 October, she announced a second short film and teased it under the name "Chapter 2: The Birth Of Dahlia", it was teased with several pictures and clips from the short film. On 21 October, Sevdaliza released the short film titled "Homunculus", the film would include a new version of her 2020 song, "Oh My God" remixed by Sleepnet. The same day, she released the remixed version of the song under the title "Oh My God (Sleepnet X Sevdaliza Remix)" onto streaming platforms as the lead single from the EP.

The second single "The Great Hope Design" was released on 24 November 2021. To help with the promotion for the EP, Sevdaliza posted several photos of a robot that she spent several years building. Sevdaliza named the robot "Dahlia" and stated Dahlia was the "World's first femmnoid". Dahlia was used in several promotional material for the EP, including being featured in the "Homunculus" short film, as well as a photo of her being used as the single cover of the "Oh My God" remix.

The EP was announced on 1 December 2021. The EP artwork featured a naked photo of Sevdaliza herself above her hips, edited with a thin waist, bigger lips, and clearer skin, most likely on par with the EP's theme of society's unrealistic standards of women. "High Alone" was released as the third single from the EP.

== Critical reception ==
Professional ratings
Review scores
Source	Rating
Beats Per Minute	4/5 stars
Crack	7.8/10
The Line of Best Fit	7/10
The Skinny	7/10

Raving Dahlia received positive reviews from music critics upon its release.

== Track listing ==
All tracks written by Sevdaliza; all tracks produced by Mucky and Sevdaliza.

No.	Title	Length
1.	"System"	4:52
2.	"High Alone"	3:54
3.	"Everything Is Everything"	3:50
4.	"The Great Hope Design"	5:20
5.	"Human Flow"	3:20
6.	"Oh My God" (Sleepnet X Sevdaliza Remix)	4:53
Total length:		26:10
