= World of Men =

World of Men is a successful gay pornographic film series of 12 productions, directed by Collin O'Neal and produced by Collin O'Neal Productions. Each of the series is based on shooting in a specific city or country (in alphabetical order): Argentina, Australia, Colombia, East Berlin, Edinburgh, Lebanon, Miami, Santo Domingo, Serbia, Spain, Turkey and Cum Fly With Collin.

== Selective filmography ==
Year	Title	Alternative title(s)	Runtime	Cast	IMDb link
2006	São Paulo	Collin O'Neal's World of Men: São Paulo	120m	Pedro Andreas; David; Renzo Dicaprio; Daniel Marvin; Collin O'Neal; Junior Panavelo; Andre Santos; Alexandre Senna; Tiago; Tito	
2006	London	Collin O'Neal's World of Men: London; Collin O'Neal's London	120m	Edu Boxer; Fred Colcci; Forneus; Jean Francko; Milan Gamiani; Ryan Garcia; Luca; Collin O'Neal	
October 2006	Lebanon	Collin O'Neal's World of Men: Lebanon; Collin O'Neal's Lebanon		Youssef Assad; Jacko; Martin Mazza; Collin O'Neal; François Sagat; Sayid	
April 2007	Miami	Collin O'Neal's World of Men: Miami	120m	Pedro Andreas; Brian Bodine; Eli; Nick Horn; Alex Keyes; C.J. Madison; Daniel Marvin; Collin O'Neal; Roman Ragazzi; Andre Santos; Mason Wyler	
August 2007	Spain		120m	Lucas Andrades (as Lucas Andradez); Igor Bad; Robert Brankov; Aitor Crash; Daniel; Dennis D'Nello; Fabio; Collin O'Neal; Leo Rocca (as Leo Rocco); Pablo Santana; Tito	
September 2007	Santo Domingo			Angelo; Antonio; Braxton Bond; Casanova; Israel Elbo; Elmato; Niko; Francisco Rey; Sister Roma; Mason Wyler; Antonio Zarbala	
October 2007	Edinburgh	Edinburgh: Collin O'Neal's World of Men; Collin O'Neal's Edinburgh	106m	Fred Colcci; Jasper Emerald; Forneus; Ryan Garcia; Josue; Fernando Leone; Marco; Collin O'Neal	
February 2008	East Berlin	Collin O'Neal's World of Men: East Berlin; Collin O'Neal's East Berlin	115m	Amir; Bijan; Robert Brankov; Mack Manus Matteo; Marcos Melo; Marcus Muller; Axel Ryder; Patrick Schwarz	
December 2009	Colombia	Collin O'Neal's World of Men: Colombia	193m	Collin O'Neal Alejandro Fernandez; Jhomar; Andres Camillo; Pedro Escobar; Samuel Lupon; Rene Quintana; Adriano Tejada; Camilo Uribe; Juan Velez	

== Awards and nominations ==
- 2007 GayVN Award winner - Best Pro/Am Release
- 2007 Grabby Award winner - Best Videography - Dan Fox & Collin O'Neal (Lebanon)
- 2007 Grabby Award nominee - Best Three-Way Sex Scene (Lebanon) with François Sagat, Collin O'Neal & Jacko
- 2008 GayVN Award nominee - Best Ethnic-Themed Video, Latin (São Paulo)
- 2008 Grabby Award nominee - Best International Video (São Paulo)
- 2008 GayVN Award nominee - Best Actor, Foreign Release - Francisco Rey (Santo Domingo)
- 2008 GayVN Award nominee - Best Ethnic-Themed Video, Latin (Santo Domingo)
