= Erik Rhodes (pornographic film actor) =

American pornographic actor and director

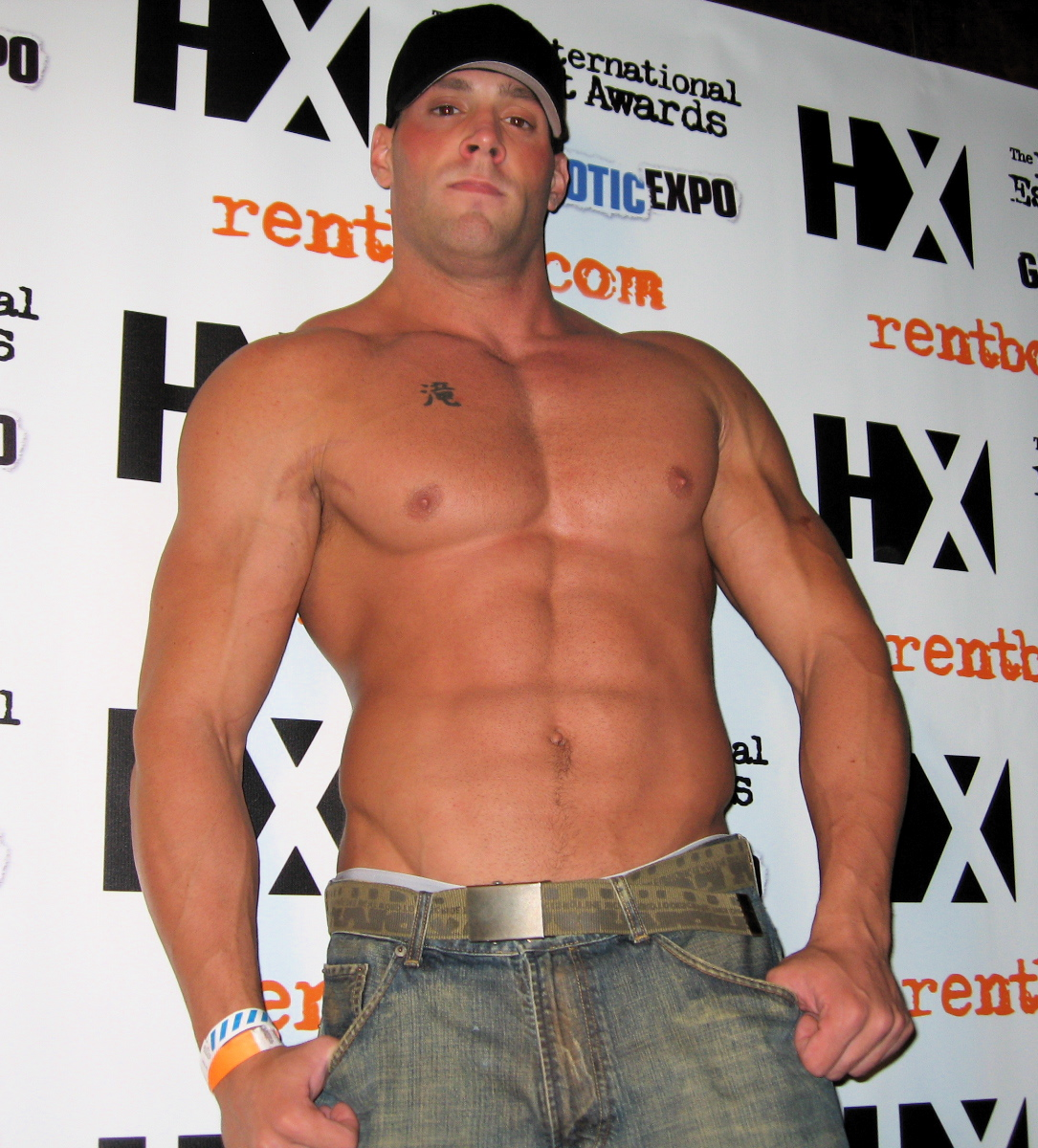
- Rhodes at the GayVN Awards in 2006
- Born: James Elliott Naughtin; February 8, 1982; Massapequa, New York, U.S.
- Died: June 14, 2012 (aged 30); New York City, U.S.
- Height: 6 ft 3 in (191 cm)
- Website: Official blog

James Elliott Naughtin (February 8, 1982 – June 14, 2012), known professionally as Erik Rhodes, was an American gay pornographic film actor and director. After making his adult film debut as a performer in 2004, Rhodes became an exclusive model with Falcon Studios, and began directing adult films for Raging Stallion Studios when the studio was acquired by Falcon in 2011. Beyond his work in pornography, Rhodes was active in New York City nightlife and celebrity circles, and was once linked to fashion designer Marc Jacobs. In 2012, Rhodes died from cardiac arrest at the age of 30.

== Biography ==
=== Early life and career ===
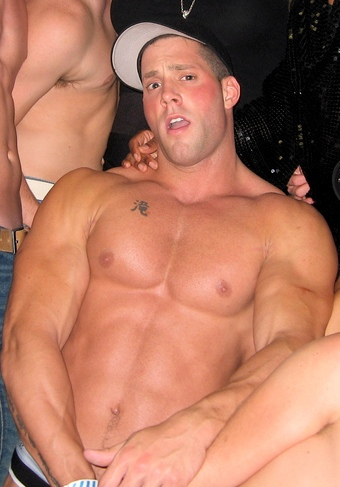
Rhodes at the Male Escort Awards in 2006

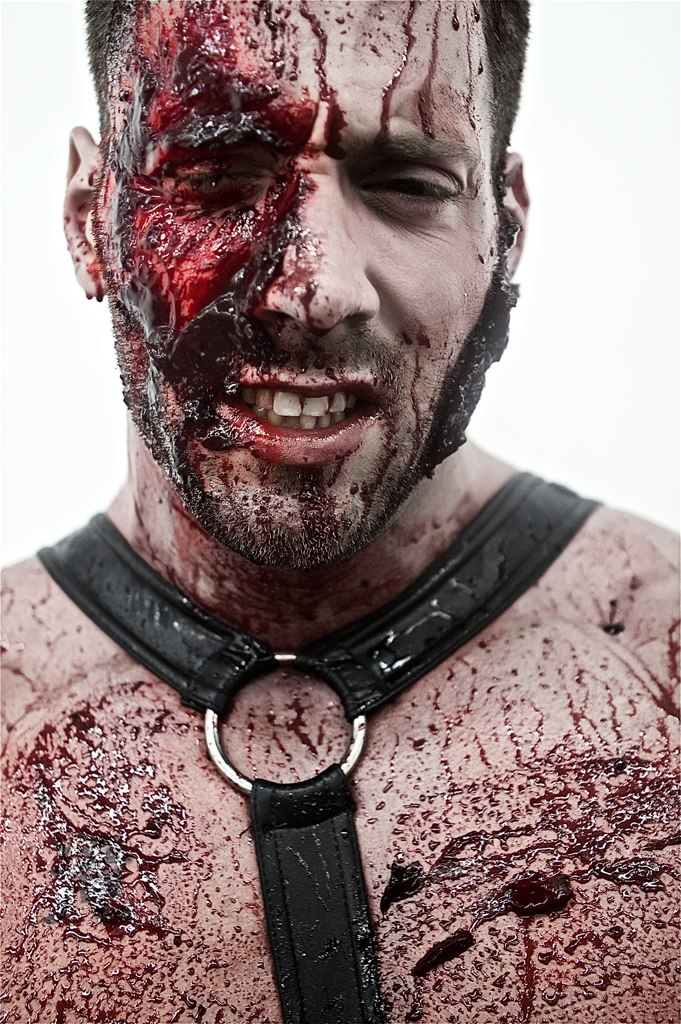
Rhodes in the 2010 film L.A. Zombie

Rhodes was born James Elliott Naughtin in Massapequa, New York. He has an identical twin brother, Jon Naughtin. Rhodes worked at a CVS and a sex shop before working as a stripper, go-go dancer, and a male escort, where he was discovered by a recruiter for the gay pornography studio Falcon Entertainment. He broke into the adult film industry at the age of 22, in the 2004 film Flesh produced by Studio 2000. The role would be Rhodes' sole non-Falcon gay pornographic feature film; he would sign an exclusive contract with Falcon in 2004, and made his debut with the studio that same year with the film Super Soaked.

Over the course of his career, Rhodes appeared in over 40 scenes with Falcon, and directed eight films for the Falcon subsidiary Mustang Studios. He began appearing in films produced by Raging Stallion Studios when the studio merged with Falcon in 2011. His notable credits include Grabby Award-nominated performances in Heaven to Hell (2005) and The Velvet Mafia (2006), and the 2007 film The Ivy League, for which he won two Grabby Awards. Rhodes was noted by outlets as one of the final gay porn stars to achieve widespread recognition and fame "in an industry increasingly faltering amidst the explosion of piracy and amateur cam sites."

Beyond his work in pornography, Rhodes was active as a socialite in gay New York nightlife, with The New York Times describing him as "an unlikely celebrity in some New York social circles." He attended New York Fashion Week, and was written about frequently by Page Six and Gawker. Rhodes was often linked to the fashion designer Marc Jacobs, though Rhodes denied that their relationship was romantic or sexual in nature. He also appeared in an advertising campaign for the department store Loehmann's, in the 2007 mainstream comedy-drama film Dedication, and in L.A. Zombie, a 2010 experimental gay zombie porn film by director Bruce LaBruce. Rhodes recorded his own music, and published it on his MySpace profile.

=== Later career and death ===
Rhodes, who was openly gay, continued to work as an escort while simultaneously shooting films with Falcon, and expressed skepticism about the gay adult entertainment industry in the final years of his life. Rhodes was open about his struggles with drug use and depression, and maintained a blog where he wrote frequently about his use of anabolic steroids and club drugs.

On June 14, 2012, Rhodes died in his sleep from cardiac arrest at the age of 30. Though an official cause of death was never released, outlets noted that Rhodes stated on his blog in the days preceding his death that he was cycling multiple steroids, including human growth hormone. In one of his final blog entries, Rhodes wrote regarding his steroid use that he was "waiting until i pop. Or my liver to fail... which every [sic] comes first." Rhodes' death was noted as one of several prominent deaths and deaths by suicide that occurred in the gay pornography industry in 2012 and 2013, alongside Arpad Miklos, Roman Ragazzi, and Wilfried Knight. A private funeral for Rhodes was held in Lake Ronkonkoma, New York; his remains were cremated, per his family's request.

In an obituary written for The New York Times, Rhodes was posthumously outed as HIV positive, with writer Jacob Bernstein revealing that Rhodes had previously been diagnosed while preparing to shoot a scene for the gay pornography website Randy Blue. Since Rhodes did not publicly reveal his HIV status during his lifetime, the Times' disclosure was the subject of controversy.

== Filmography ==
=== As actor ===
Title	Year	Studio	Notes	Ref(s)
Flesh	2004	Studio 2000		
Super Soaked	2005	Falcon Entertainment		
Heaven to Hell	2005	Falcon Entertainment		
Flex	2005	Falcon Entertainment		
Cross-Country, Part 1	2005	Falcon Entertainment		
Cross-Country, Part 2	2005	Falcon Entertainment		
Driver	2005	Falcon Entertainment		
Beefcake	2006	Falcon Entertainment		
From Top to Bottom	2006	Falcon Entertainment		
The Velvet Mafia, Part 1	2006	Falcon Entertainment		
The Farmer's Son	2007	Falcon Entertainment		
Basic Plumbing 3	2007	Falcon Entertainment		
Rush and Release	2007	Falcon Entertainment		
Ivy League	2007	Falcon Entertainment		
Dare	2007	Falcon Entertainment		
Overtime	2007	Falcon Entertainment		
Dedication	2007	Plum Pictures	Feature film	
Fleet Week	2008	Falcon Entertainment		
Pledgemaster: The Hazing	2008	Falcon Entertainment		
Afterparty	2008	Falcon Entertainment		
Best Men, Part 1: The Bachelor Party	2008	Falcon Entertainment		
Best Men, Part 2: The Wedding Party	2008	Falcon Entertainment		
Asylum	2009	Falcon Entertainment		
Ringside	2009	Falcon Entertainment		
L.A. Zombie	2010	Dark Alley Media	Feature film	
What Goes Around	2011	Falcon Entertainment		
He's Got A Big Package	2011	Raging Stallion Studios		
Roughin' It 2	2011	Falcon Entertainment		
It Gets Bigger	2012	Raging Stallion Studios		
High Voltage	2012	Raging Stallion Studios		
Body Shop	2012	Falcon Entertainment	Posthumous release	

=== As director ===
Title	Year	Studio	Notes	Ref(s)
Rhodes' Rules	2010	Mustang Studios		
Depths of Desire, Part 1	2010	Mustang Studios	Co-directed with Steven Scarborough	
Crotch Rocket	2010	Mustang Studios		
Depths of Desire, Part 2	2010	Mustang Studios	Co-directed with Steven Scarborough	
Fit for Service	2010	Mustang Studios		
Man Up	2011	Mustang Studios		
Worked Up	2011	Mustang Studios		
Rhodes' Rules, Part 2	2012	Mustang Studios		

== Awards ==
Year	Nominated work	Category	Award	Result	Notes	Ref.
2006	Heaven to Hell	Best Group Sex Scene	Grabby Awards	Nominated		
2006	—	Best Newcomer	Grabby Awards	Nominated		
2007	—	Best Performer	Grabby Awards	Nominated		
2007	—	Best Versatile Performer	Grabby Awards	Nominated		
2007	The Velvet Mafia	Best Actor	Grabby Awards	Nominated		
2008	Ivy League	Best Actor	Grabby Awards	Won	Tied with Jason Ridge.	
2008	—	Best Versatile Performer	Grabby Awards	Won		
2008	Ivy League	Best Group Sex Scene	Grabby Awards	Nominated		
2008	Ivy League	Best Rimming Scene	Grabby Awards	Nominated		
2008	—	Performer of the Year	GayVN Awards	Nominated		
2008	Ivy League	Best Actor	GayVN Awards	Nominated		
2009	—	GLBT Performer of the Year	XBIZ Awards	Nominated		

== See also ==
- LGBT culture in New York City
- List of LGBT people from New York City
- List of male performers in gay porn films
- NYC Pride March
