= The Necro Files =

1997 film by Matt Jaissle

- Directed by: Matt Jaissle
- Written by: Todd Tjersland; Sammy Shapiro
- Produced by: Matt Jaissle; Todd Tjersland
- Cinematography: Matt Jaissle
- Edited by: Matt Jaissle
- Music by: Matt Jaissle
- Release date: 1997
- Country: United States
- Language: English

The Necro Files is a 1997 horror comedy zombie film by director Matt Jaissle. The film depicts zombies as sexual creatures whose desires for human flesh are not limited to anthropophagy.

== Plot ==
The film follows a zombie rapist as he returns from the dead to cannibalize and assault the living.

== Reception ==
Erik Piepenburg of The New York Times called the film a "jaw-droppingly gory trash fest" which should be seen by "video disciples with steel caldrons for stomachs". Noreen Giffney expresses in her book Queering the Non/human that the film "offers cinematic representations of clinical associations between criminality, murder and necrophilia" but that the film is infantile.

== Sequels ==
The film was followed by two sequels Necro Files 2 (2003) and Necro Files 3000 (2017).

== See also ==
- List of zombie films
- Zombie pornography
