= Sevdaliza =

Iranian-Dutch singer (born 1987)

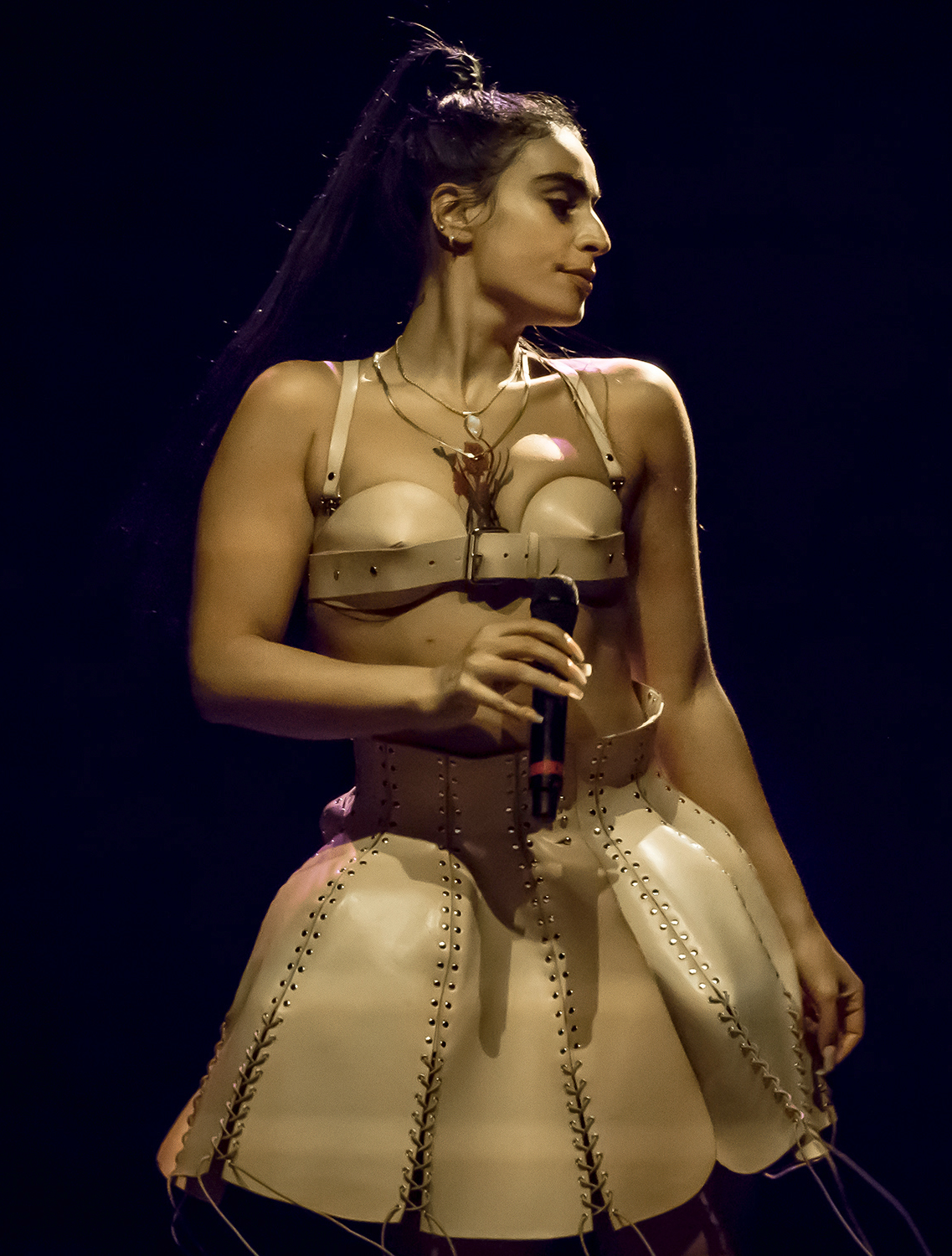
- Sevdaliza performing in 2018

Background information
- Born: Sevda Alizadeh; 1 September 1987 (age 39); Tehran, Iran
- Origin: Rotterdam, Netherlands
- Genres: Electronic; alternative R&B; trip hop; avant-pop
- Occupations: Singer; songwriter; producer
- Years active: 2013–present
- Label: Twisted Elegance
- Website: sevdaliza.com

Sevda Alizadeh (Persian: سِودا علیزاده; born 1 September 1987), known professionally as Sevdaliza, is an Iranian-Dutch singer, songwriter, record producer, visual artist, and director. In 2015, she released two EPs, The Suspended Kid and Children of Silk. While she sings mostly in English, she released her first Persian-language song, "Bebin", in early 2017 in protest of Executive Order 13769. Her debut album, ISON, was published on 26 April 2017 via her record label, Twisted Elegance. In 2018, she released a third EP, The Calling, followed by her second studio album, Shabrang, in 2020.

== Life and career ==
=== Early life ===
Alizadeh was born on 1 September 1987 in Tehran, Iran. She is of Azerbaijani, Russian, and Persian descent. She moved with her family to the Netherlands at the age of five. At 16, she left home after obtaining a basketball scholarship, eventually playing on the Dutch national basketball team. She went to university, graduating with a master's degree in communications. Sevdaliza is fluent in Persian, Dutch, English, French, and Portuguese.

=== 2014–2018: The Suspended Kid, Children of Silk and ISON ===
In March 2014, Sevdaliza released her single "Clear Air" along with a music video. It was later followed by "Sirens of the Caspian" and "Backseat Love". In January 2015, her extended play (EP), The Suspended Kid, was issued, which she had worked on for over a year and half. The title of the EP is about how people responded to Sevdaliza in social situations, saying "I realized that those things that deflect me from social situations—not getting along with your coach or your boss or whatever—it made me realize I had to choose a different path." The Suspended Kid was produced by Sevdaliza and Rotterdam-based producer and frequent collaborator, Mucky. In September, a music video for the last remaining track on the EP, the industrial R&B "That Other Girl", was released. In June, she released "Marilyn Monroe", which served as the lead single from her second EP, Children of Silk. The song has been characterized as trip hop and was accompanied by a music video which was released in March 2016. Children of Silk was released in November. Sevdaliza cited textures such as skin, glass, and silk as the main inspiration behind the EP. In May, Sevdaliza released a short film titled The Formula, which tells the story of how "the pain of losing an unborn child destroyed balance in marriage and leads to tragedy." Directed by Emmanuel Adjei, the short film features three songs by Sevdaliza, "The Formula", "The Language of Limbo" and "Mad Woman"; the latter was issued as a single the following year in October. A new single titled "Time" was released in the same month. In the following month, another single titled "Human" was released along with a music video. "Human", "Marilyn Monroe" and "The Language of Limbo" would later be included on Sevdaliza's debut studio album, ISON.

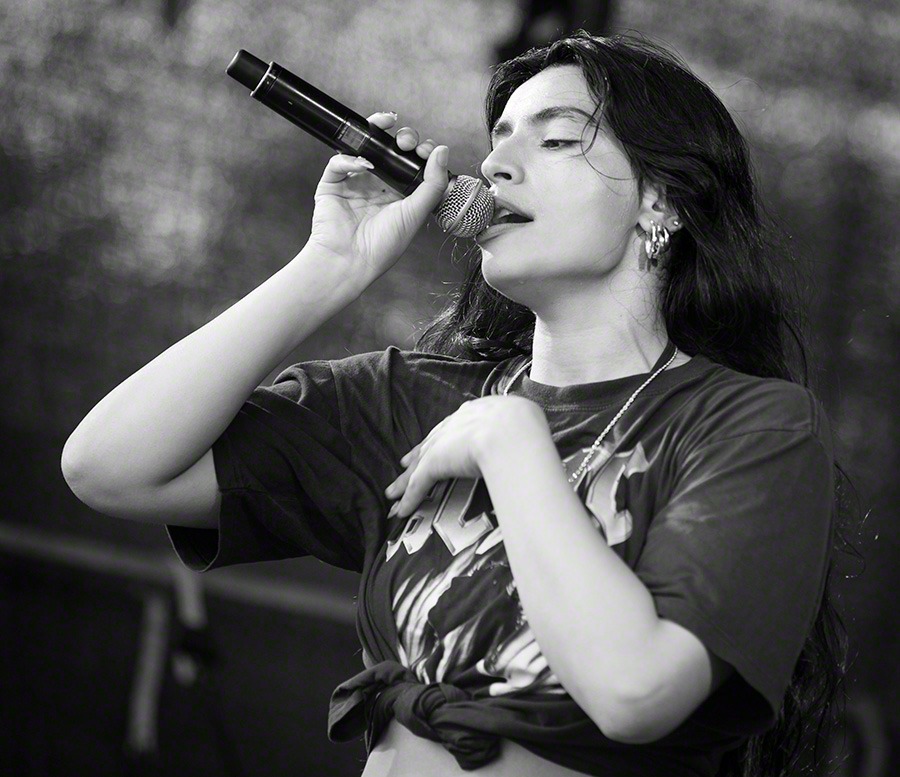
Sevdaliza performing in Oslo (2016)

In January 2017, Sevdaliza released her first Persian-language song, "Bebin", in response to Executive Order 13769. She stated, "In protest of the inhumane political climate, I could not rest my head in privilege. I wrote 'Bebin' in Farsi, to solidify. I stand strong with love. In this case I choose to avoid mainstream media, because I have no interest in part taking in a victimized concept. Take this message without lights, camera, action. I am solely a messenger. In the brain of love, there is no place for racism nor bigotry." In February, a music video was released for "Amandine Insensible", which showcases the limited roles women are expected to fill in modern culture. Sevdaliza said, "The story of Amandine explores the concept of 'identity' in a contemporary world that is rapidly changing due to the disappearance of 'boundaries'. Amandine is everything you want her to be. An extreme extraction of average life, representing a world where we have become so universal all feelings have disappeared. Paradoxically, this makes you feel uncomfortable. Her life takes place in an infinite white space, composed with minimal objects that represent different facets of the cycle of daily life." In April, "Hero" was released as the second single from her debut studio album, ISON. The album was released in April 2017, and is named after Comet ISON, a sungrazing comet.

In January 2018, Sevdaliza released a new track "Soul Syncable" and it was released on the day of the super blue moon. "Soul Syncable" is the first song from Sevdaliza, following her debut album ISON. In February, she released the track "Human Nature". "Soul Syncable" and "Human Nature" are part of her EP The Calling, which was released in March.

In May, she released a Portuguese-language version of her track "Human", titled "Humana", to celebrate and thank its 10 million views.

=== 2019–present: Shabrang, Ride or Die, Alibi, and Heroina ===
On March 8, 2019, Sevdaliza released a new single which would be the beginning of a new musical chapter in her career, "Darkest Hour". It was succeeded by the non-album single "Martyr" the following month.

Sevdaliza then released three singles in 2020, "Oh My God", "Lamp Lady" and "Joanna", before announcing her second studio album Shabrang, with a release of 28 August 2020. Shabrang also features the single "Human Nature", which also appeared on her 2018 extended play The Calling.

Shabrang was released on 28 August, 2020 to critical acclaim. It peaked at number 39 on the Dutch Albums Chart.

In 2021, Sevdaliza released a number of new singles including "The Great Hope Design" and "High Alone", which debuted alongside a robot that she had built over the course of several years. These were in preparation for her fourth EP, Raving Dahlia, which released February 25, 2022 and received considerable praise from critics.

On October 7, 2022, Sevdaliza released "Woman Life Freedom" in response to the Mahsa Amini protests in Iran, Sevdaliza's home country.

The song "Ride Or Die", featuring Puerto Rican rapper Villano Antillano, released on June 22, 2023, going viral on social media app TikTok.

A string of singles released in 2023 and 2024, including "Nothing Lasts Forever", featuring Grimes, released on November 3. The 23rd of the same month saw the release of "Who Are You Running From", a song featured in the Josef Altin-directed short film I Don't Know Where to Start.

Ride or Die, Pt. 2 was released on, April 18, 2024, featuring, along with Antillano, Dominican rapper Tokischa.

June 28, 2024, saw the release of viral song "Alibi", featuring Brazilian singer and drag queen Pabllo Vittar and French singer-songwriter Yseult. The track was Sevdaliza's debut at Spotify Top 50 chart, and was promoted with performances at The Tonight Show Starring Jimmy Fallon and NRJ Music Award.

In October 2024, Sevdaliza released "No Me Cansaré", a collaboration with Colombian singer Karol G.

In August 2025, Sevdaliza's scheduled performance at the Coca-Cola Music Fest in Armenia was canceled following criticism from religious groups over her music video "Messiah," which featured religious imagery. Organizers cited public concerns; the cancellation received mixed reactions.

In October 2025, Sevdaliza released Heroina. The album consists of thirteen tracks, and features artists such as Eartheater, Pabllo Vittar, Yseult, Karol G, Villano Antillano, Tokischa, Kenia Os, and La Joaqui. The music publication Rolling Stone describes the album as an "an ode to femininity", while citing Sevdaliza herself who stated that "Heroina is about wanting to be free, and at the same time feeling how limited that freedom can be".

== Artistry ==
=== Musical style and influences ===
Sevdaliza's music incorporates electronic, alternative R&B, trip hop, experimental pop, and avant-pop. Critics have compared her music to the trip hop of Portishead with string arrangements recalling Siouxsie and the Banshees circa "Dazzle" and Homogenic-era Björk.

According to Sevdaliza, "I think my sound would mostly be described as pure and raw. I'm not necessarily drawn to a genre, but to a process, or towards a certain mood like melancholy. The interesting thing is that the music that my music gets compared to is not necessarily music I've listened to, which makes it super interesting. I was performing once, and a conservatory professor came to me after the show, saying that he could really hear that I draw inspiration from old Persian singers. I asked him, "Wow, that's really interesting. How do you hear that?," and he said because I use certain semitones and microtones when I sing. But I've never had a singing lesson in my life, and I've never listened to Persian music in my life! It's really interesting to me that some things just come to you unconsciously like that. It's like you have this brain and it's unconsciously and consciously registering everything and in combination with your DNA it just becomes... something."

Sevdaliza's music is inspired by ideas of womanhood, identity, and motherhood.

=== Music videos ===
Her album, ISON, is a visual album and has a video that is 1 hour, 6 minutes, and 28 seconds long. Unlike similar visual albums, the film is abstract and meant to be viewed in one sitting, as it subtly changes like a "moving painting". Her general goal with her music videos is to "make it vulnerable and more than human at the same time."

==== "Human" ====
Sevdaliza appears to be a satyr and an erotic dancer performing in a semi-abandoned large building with classical detailing in front of an audience sitting on a mezzanine. The audience consists of only men, who are clearly wealthy, being served food and receiving this seemingly private and exclusive performance. The time and place that this is occurring remains ambiguous, mostly because of the mysteriousness of Sevdaliza's semi-mythological character, who is dancing on dirt that has been plowed as in preparation for an animal race. Additionally, her outfit recalls that of Debra Paget in the 1959 film The Indian Tomb, a nod to old Hollywood nostalgia and popular roles women play catering to male sexual desire. The audience members sweat and watch cautiously, as if scared of her. Her video on YouTube is accompanied by the quote, 'the basic human need to be watched was once satisfied by god'. There is an official rendition of the song in Brazilian-Portuguese. The video for Human was directed by Emmanuel Adjei.

==== "Amandine Insensible" ====
Sevdaliza performs several archetypal figures of women in contemporary society. These archetypes are all solo and set against a bright white background, with watermarks and are meant to represent the limited roles accessible to women. As a commentary on the commercialization of everyday life, Sevdaliza sold clips from the music video to Shutterstock. There is the "confident, powerful woman active wear", "professional woman operator call center business", "glamorous sensual woman in silk garment", "confidant ethnic woman leather suit umbrella", and "glamorous woman wow white fur piano". Sevdaliza says that "The accessibility of information and matter has created a new universal language, in which commercial brands play a key role."

==== "Bluecid" ====
Sevdaliza dances a slow tango-inspired duet with François Sagat in a large, ornately decorated hall with a golden table set for two in the middle of the room. The video is written and directed by Sevdaliza and Zahra Reijs and was released in 2017.

==== "Nothing Lasts Forever" ====
In collaboration with Grimes, Sevdaliza released this single with a music video that uses AI to put the faces of both singers, alongside Madonna, ASAP Ferg and Julia Fox, on top of female bodybuilder's bodies. The whole video was filmed in an empty parking lot and it also features Sevdaliza without any technological alternations dancing and posing.

=== Album art ===
==== ISON ====
The album art for ISON features a hyper-realistic bust of Sevdaliza herself, barely superimposed and upside down over a mannequin copy that appears to be covered with fresh bright red paint. The hair that is hanging upside down, drapes over the shoulder of the bright red bust. Both appear to be sweaty or wet. The silicone sculpture is by sculptor Sarah Sitkin. Stikin says "The idea is based around Sevdaliza being the mother to herself and her past lives. It carries her vulnerability stoically. Her features distorted, some omitted, some emphasized. A new form is repeated through her 16 children (number of songs) surrounding her."

== Awards and nominations ==
Award	Year	Category	Nominee(s)	Result	Ref.
Berlin Music Video Awards	2016	Best Experimental	"That Other Girl"	Nominated	
Berlin Music Video Awards	2020	Best Song	"Habibi"	Nominated	
Berlin Music Video Awards	2021	Best Song	"Habibi"	Nominated	
Berlin Music Video Awards	2022	Best Director	"Homunculus (Oh My God)"	Nominated	
Berlin Music Video Awards	2022	Best Visual Effects	"Everything Is Everything"	Won	
Berlin Music Video Awards	2024	Most Bizzare	"Nothing Lasts Forever" (with Grimes)	Nominated	
Berlin Music Video Awards	2026	Best Concept	"Heroina" (featuring La Joaqui)	Nominated	
BreakTudo Awards	2024	International Artist on the Rise	Herself	Nominated	
BreakTudo Awards	2024	International Collaboration of the Year	"Alibi" (with Pabllo Vittar and Yseult)	Nominated	
Camerimage	2018	Best Music Video	"Shahmaran"	Nominated	
D&AD Awards	2019	Visual Effects	"Shahmaran"	Nominated	
Shark Music Video Awards	2018	Best Cinematography	"Shahmaran"	Won	
Shark Music Video Awards	2018	Writing/Idea/Concept	"Shahmaran"	Won	
Shark Music Video Awards	2018	Best Music Video	"Shahmaran"	Nominated	
Shark Music Video Awards	2018	Best Color Grading	"Hear My Pain Heal"	Nominated	
WME Awards	2024	Latin American Song	"Alibi" (with Pabllo Vittar and Yseult)	Won	

== Discography ==
=== Studio albums ===
Title	Details	Peak chart positions		
Title	Details	NLD	BEL	GER
ISON	Released: 26 April 2017; Label: Twisted Elegance; Formats: CD, LP, digital download, streaming	192	—	—
Shabrang	Released: 28 August 2020; Label: Twisted Elegance; Formats: CD, LP, digital download, streaming	39	166	100
Heroina	Released: 31 October 2025; Label: Broke; Create Music Group; Formats: CD, LP, digital download, streaming	—	—	—
"—" denotes a recording that did not chart.

=== Extended plays ===
Title	Track listing	Details
The Suspended Kid	1 "That Other Girl"; 2 "Sirens of the Caspian"; 3 "Clear Air"; 4 "Backseat Love"; 5 "Taste"; 6 "Underneath"	Released: 28 January 2015; Label: Twisted Elegance; Format: LP, digital download; "Taste" and "Underneath" were later deleted
Children of Silk	1 "The Inside"; 2 "Amandine Insensible"; 3 "Marilyn Monroe"; 4 "Men of Glass" (featuring Rome Fortune)	Released: 24 November 2015; Label: Twisted Elegance; Format: LP, digital download
The Calling	1 "Soul Syncable"; 2 "5D"; 3 "Soothsayer"; 4 "Energ1"; 5 "Human Nature"; 6 "Voodoov"; 7 "Observer"	Released: 30 March 2018; Label: Twisted Elegance; Format: LP, digital download
Raving Dahlia	1 "System"; 2 "High Alone"; 3 "Everything Is Everything"; 4 "The Great Hope Design"; 5 "Human Flow"; 6 "Oh My God (Sleepnet X Sevdaliza Remix)"	Released: 25 February 2022; Label: Twisted Elegance; Format: LP, digital download

=== Singles ===
List of singles as lead artist, with selected chart positions and certifications, showing album name and year released
Title	Year	Peak chart positions											Album
Title	Year	NLD	BRA	FRA	GER	IRE	SPA	SWI	UK	US	WW	Certifications	Album
"Colorblind"	2013	—	—	—	—	—	—	—	—	—	—		
"Race Against the Machine"	2013	—	—	—	—	—	—	—	—	—	—		
"Lions"	2013	—	—	—	—	—	—	—	—	—	—		
"Clear Air"	2014	—	—	—	—	—	—	—	—	—	—		The Suspended Kid
"Sirens of the Caspian"	2014	—	—	—	—	—	—	—	—	—	—		The Suspended Kid
"Backseat Love"	2014	—	—	—	—	—	—	—	—	—	—		The Suspended Kid
"The Valley"	2015	—	—	—	—	—	—	—	—	—	—		
"One Armed Lullaby"	2015	—	—	—	—	—	—	—	—	—	—		
"Time"	2016	—	—	—	—	—	—	—	—	—	—		
"Human"	2016	—	—	—	—	—	—	—	—	—	—		ISON
"Bebin"	2017	—	—	—	—	—	—	—	—	—	—		
"Hero"	2017	—	—	—	—	—	—	—	—	—	—		ISON
"Hubris"	2017	—	—	—	—	—	—	—	—	—	—		ISON
"Marilyn Monroe"	2017	—	—	—	—	—	—	—	—	—	—		Children of Silk and ISON
"Mad Woman"	2017	—	—	—	—	—	—	—	—	—	—		
"Soul Syncable"	2018	—	—	—	—	—	—	—	—	—	—		The Calling
"Human Nature"	2018	—	—	—	—	—	—	—	—	—	—		The Calling and Shabrang
"Darkest Hour"	2019	—	—	—	—	—	—	—	—	—	—		Shabrang
"Martyr"	2019	—	—	—	—	—	—	—	—	—	—		
"Oh My God"	2020	—	—	—	—	—	—	—	—	—	—		Shabrang
"Lamp Lady"	2020	—	—	—	—	—	—	—	—	—	—		Shabrang
"Joanna"	2020	—	—	—	—	—	—	—	—	—	—		Shabrang
"Habibi"	2020	—	—	—	—	—	—	—	—	—	—		Shabrang
"Rhode"	2020	—	—	—	—	—	—	—	—	—	—		Shabrang
"Oh My God" (Sleepnet X Sevdaliza Remix)	2021	—	—	—	—	—	—	—	—	—	—		Raving Dahlia
"The Great Hope Design"	2021	—	—	—	—	—	—	—	—	—	—		Raving Dahlia
"High Alone"	2022	—	—	—	—	—	—	—	—	—	—		Raving Dahlia
"Everything Is Everything"	2022	—	—	—	—	—	—	—	—	—	—		Raving Dahlia
"Woman Life Freedom"	2022	—	—	—	—	—	—	—	—	—	—		
"Ride or Die" (with Villano Antillano or "Pt. 2" with Villano Antillano and Tokischa)	2023	—	—	—	—	—	65	—	—	—	112	PROMUSICAE: Gold	Heroina
"Nothing Lasts Forever" (with Grimes)	2023	—	—	—	—	—	—	—	—	—	—		
"Who Are You Running From"	2023	—	—	—	—	—	—	—	—	—	—		
"Good Torture" (with Elyanna)	2024	—	—	—	—	—	—	—	—	—	—		
"Alibi" (with Pabllo Vittar and Yseult or "Pt. 2" with also Anitta)	2024	55	5	9	20	44	85	3	58	95	15	PROMUSICAE: Gold; SNEP: Diamond; RIAA: Gold	Heroina
"No Me Cansare" (featuring Karol G)	2024	—	—	—	—	—	—	—	—	—	—		Heroina
"Maria Magdalena" (featuring Irmãs de Pau)	2025	—	—	—	—	—	—	—	—	—	—		Heroina
"Heroina" (featuring La Joaqui)	2025	—	—	—	—	—	—	—	—	—	—		Heroina
"Messiah"	2025	—	—	—	—	—	—	—	—	—	—		Heroina
"Strong Because You Are"	2025	—	—	—	—	—	—	—	—	—	—		Heroina
"Stripper" (featuring Kenia Os)	2025	—	—	—	—	—	—	—	—	—	—		Heroina
"—" denotes items which were not released in that country or failed to chart.

=== Guest appearances ===
Title	Year	Other artist(s)	Album
"Haunted"	2015	Stwo	D.S.T.N.T.
"Sev"	2019	SebastiAn	Thirst
"Shlut"	2023	Shygirl	Nymph_o
"Samsara"	2023	Anyma	Genesys
"Fortuna"	2025	Anyma	The End of Genesys
"Rich Man"	2025	Aespa	Non-album song

== Videography ==
=== Music videos ===
Title	Year	Director(s)	Ref.
"Race Against the Machine"	2013	Sevdaliza	
"Lions"	2013	Sevdaliza	
"Clear Air"	2014	Sevdaliza	
"Sirens of the Caspian"	2014	Atlynn Vrolijk	
"Backseat Love"	2014	Atlynn Vrolijk; Lisette Donkersloot	
"That Other Girl"	2015	Pussykrew	
"The Valley"	2015	Zahra Reijs	
"Marilyn Monroe"	2016	Hirad Sab	
"Human"	2016	Emmanuel Adjei	
"Amandine Insensible"	2017	Piet Langeveld	
"Bluecid"	2017	Sevdaliza; Zahra Reijs	
"Hear My Pain Heal"	2017	Ian Pons Jewell	
"Duality"	2018	Emmanuel Adjei	
"Shahmaran"	2018	Emmanuel Adjei	
"Martyr"	2019	Marlou Fernanda; Sevdaliza	
"Oh My God"	2020	Sevdaliza; Willemskantine	
"Joanna"	2020	Marlou Fernanda; Sevdaliza	
"Habibi"	2020	Anastasia Konovalova; Sevdaliza	
"Rhode"	2020	Anna Himma	
"Darkest Hour"	2021	Sarah Benjamin; An Simin; Willemskantine	
"Homunculus (Oh My God)"	2021	Willemskantine; Sevdaliza	
"Ride Or Die Pt.2" (Lyric Video)	2024	Sevdaliza; Mathias Janmaat	
"Alibi"	2024	Fernando Nogari	
"No Me Cansare"	2024	WILLEMSKANTINE	
"Maria Magdalena"	2025	Jenna Marsh	
"Heroina"	2025	Tanu Muiño	
"Messiah"	2025	Tanu Muiño	
"Strong Because You Are"	2025	Willem Kantine	

=== Films ===
Year	Title	Role	Director	Notes
2016	The Formula	Zillah	Emmanuel Adjei	Short film
