= Human Nature (brand) =

Brand of personal care products

- A Human Nature store at SM Megamall
- Product type: Personal care, infant care, home care
- Current owner: Gawad Kalikasan, Inc.
- Country: Philippines
- Introduced: 2008; 18 years ago
- Markets: Philippines, United States, Singapore
- Website: https://humanheartnature.com

Human Nature is a Philippine brand of natural baby care, personal care, and home care products owned by Gandang Kalikasan, Inc. The first major personal care brand in the Philippines to make all-natural products, it has been certified by the Natural Products Association. According to Gandang Kalikasan president and co-founder Anna Meloto Wilk, the brand was inspired by her belief "that each family should use 'natural and safe products'" that would also be "'affordable and accessible' to many."

== History ==
Before co-founding Gandang Kalikasan, Camille Meloto, Anna Meloto Wilk, and Dylan Wilk, who were volunteers of Philippine NGO Gawad Kalinga (GK), went to San Jose, California in 2007 to advocate for the NGO with the aim of establishing groups of GK volunteers among the Filipino American communities in the United States, particularly in the West Coast. While doing this, they noticed an already growing American demand for natural products, and they initially thought of importing the natural products they saw in the American market to the Philippines.

However, Meloto Wilk, who would later become Gandang Kalikasan's president, thought that this idea would only embrace a small market, given that imported products in the Philippines become generally expensive due to the high import tariffs collected by the Philippine government. She also thought that such a venture would not include the local communities that GK had been working with, so they turned their initial idea around and came up with the plan of forming a company that would export to the world natural products made in Filipino villages.

Gawad Kalikasan, Inc. was established the following year, with three innovative facets to its structure.

=== Gawad Kalikasan's pro-Philippines, pro-poor, and pro-environment philosophy ===
First, Gawad Kalikasan was designed as a social enterprise that would aim to positively impact local communities and rural farmers in the Philippines, particularly poor ones. To this end, Meloto Wilk and her team would invest in programs that not only would provide production training but also skills development for improving farmers' productivity as well as values formation for raising quality of life. Her company would partner with Gawad Kalinga and other organizations that shared the same vision. With these organizations they would develop certified organic farms in the countryside that held the promise of producing excellent raw materials for what would be the company's Human Nature-branded products, as well as grow other community-based enterprises that would multiply the poor communities' income. Starting with four employees in 2008, the company grew to have 400 full-time regular employees in 2018, half of whom came from communities formed by Gawad Kalinga. These employees were formerly tricycle drivers, gleaners or dumpster divers, and fixed-term workers who were now working for the Human Nature brand as warehousemen, merchandising agents and office workers with full-time employee benefits.

Second, the company envisioned all of its products as certified natural. Thus, while Human Nature became the Philippines' first major personal care brand, it also became the country's first certified member of the Natural Products Association of the United States. Around 34 of its products have been awarded the "natural seal" by the organization.

Finally, Gawad Kalikasan introduced a radical innovation in business practices with human resources focused on providing "a fair living wage" way above the minimum wage required by Philippine labor laws, private health care benefits, "interest-free" personal loans for emergency cases, life skills through coaching (including managing finances, maintaining a work-life balance, and managing family time), a no-firing policy for regular employees (the company would only impose sanctions on erring employees with the objective of improving their behavior and skills set), values formation and a "no work on Sunday" policy, and a won't-condone-fixed-term-contract-work policy (all employees of the company must be full-time employees enjoying company-extended benefits).

== Products ==
While the brand boasts a wide array of products, some of their most popular products include their sunflower beauty oil, tinted lip balms, hair strengthening shampoo, fragrance-free cleansing soap bar, chamomile-scented natural feminine wash, baby wash, skin-shielding oil (citronella-based insect repellent), spray sanitizers, and natural dishwashing liquid, pure rosehip oil, and hair-revival coco mask.

== Affiliations ==
Human Nature became the country's first certified member of the Natural Products Association of the United States. It is registered as a participating organization in the World Economic Forum, where its founders Dylan Wilk and Anna Maria Meloto Wilk are also listed as participating business leaders.

== Awards ==
Aside from having 34 of its products awarded a "natural seal" by the Natural Products Association, Anna Meloto Wilk was awarded Woman of the Year in the 2017 Beauty Industry Awards in London organized by the publication Cosmetics Design.

In 2016, Sustainable Beauty Awards, organized by Organic Motor, a global specialist as a research and consulting company for organic products and related industries, gave the company the Sustainability Pioneer Award.
