= Children of Silk =

EP by Sevdaliza
- Released: 24 November 2015
- Genre: Trip hop; R&B
- Length: 15:41
- Label: Twisted Elegance
- Producer: Mucky; Sevdaliza

Sevdaliza chronology
The Suspended Kid (2015)	Children of Silk (2015)	ISON (2017)

Singles from Children of Silk
- 1. "Marilyn Monroe" Released: 19 June 2015; 2. "Men of Glass" Released: 11 November 2015

Children of Silk is the second EP by Iranian-Dutch singer-songwriter Sevdaliza released on 24 November 2015 by Twisted Elegance.

== Critical reception ==
Paley Martin of Billboard noted that Sevdaliza on this album reflects on the internal conflicts that link her abstract aesthetics into something universally resonating. Adrienne Black from the Pigeons & Planes magazine wrote that the EP balances on a fine line between soothing and haunting, as both the production and Sevdaliza's own voice help make this possible. Rachel Fotheringham, in a review for KRUI-FM, noted that if you are interested in artists such as The Weeknd and Lana Del Rey, then the sound of Sevdaliza is perfect for you. She was also very impressed with the album, stating that it is equally soothing, sensual and exciting.

== Track listing ==
All tracks are written by Reynard Bargmann, Joel Dieleman, and Sevda Alizadeh.

Children of Silk track listing
No.	Title	Length
1.	"The Inside"	3:35
2.	"Amandine Insensible"	4:13
3.	"Marilyn Monroe"	3:29
4.	"Men of Glass" (featuring Rome Fortune)	4:22
Total length:		15:41
