= François Sagat =

French pornographic actor, model and director

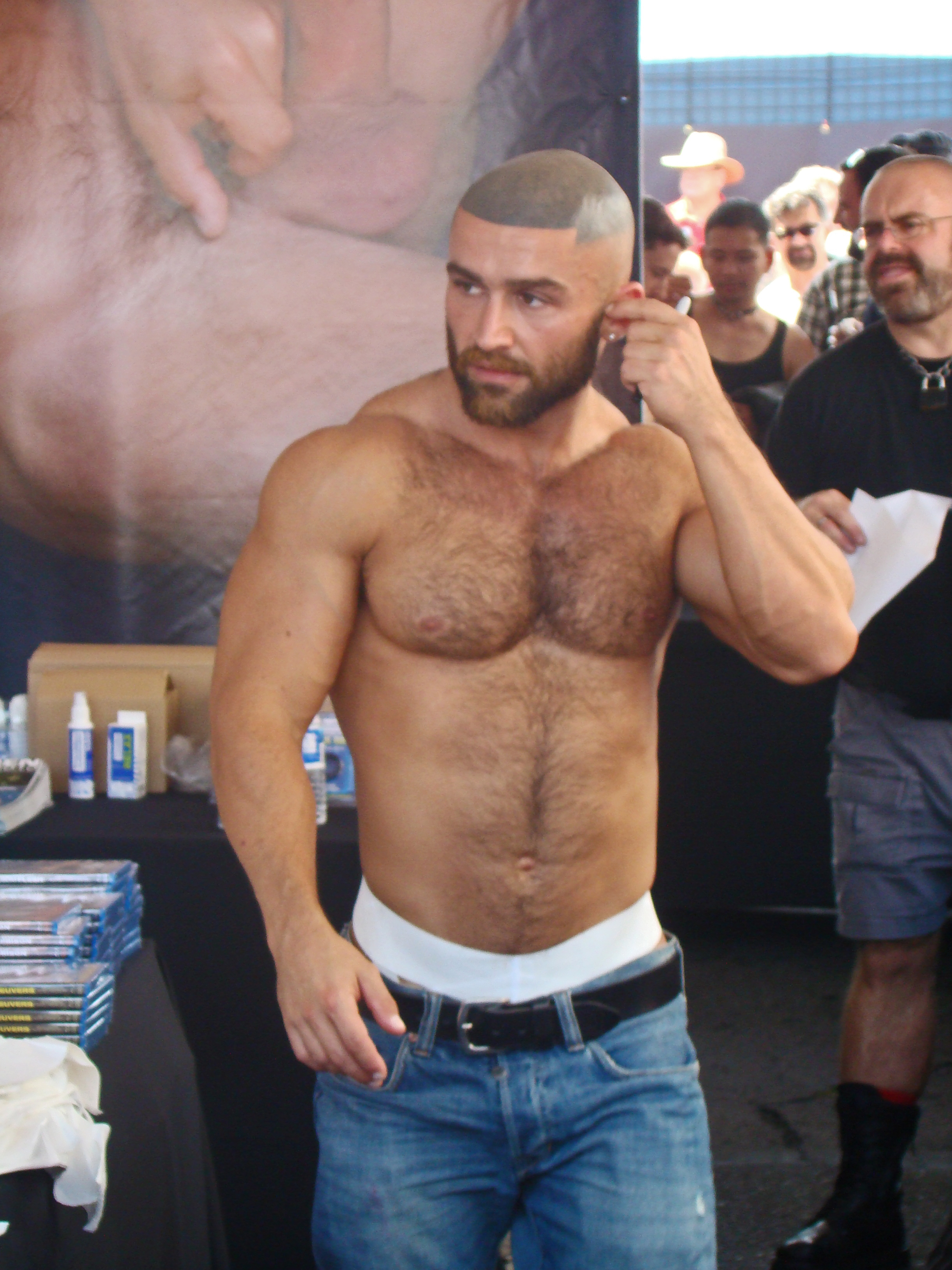
- Sagat at the Folsom Street Fair in 2009
- Born: June 5, 1979 (age 47); Cognac, Charente, France
- Other name: Azzedine
- Occupations: Pornographic actor; model; director; singer
- Years active: 2004–present
- Height: 1.73 m (5 ft 8 in)
- Website: http://www.francoissagat.com

François Sagat (French pronunciation: [fʁɑ̃swa saɡa]; born June 5, 1979) is a French gay male pornographic film actor, model and director.

== Career ==
=== Adult film ===
At the age of twenty-five, Sagat performed in his first adult film under the screen name "Azzedine".

After several films with Citébeur as "Azzedine", he moved to the United States and shot his first scene for the porn film Arabesque by Raging Stallion Studios using his birth name. He stayed with Raging Stallion Studios from 2005 to 2006 before becoming an exclusive porn star at Titan Media.

As a pornographic actor, he was both top and bottom and also performed BDSM.

In 2010, he appeared in a zombie porn film directed by Bruce LaBruce in the lead role in L.A. Zombie, where he played role of a homeless schizophrenic man. He also appeared in the lead role in Homme au bain (in English Man in Bath), directed by Christophe Honoré.

In October 2011, Sagat directed a two-part porn film series titled Incubus for TitanMen. In support of the film, TitanMen in November 2011 released, a 33-minute making-of documentary.

In 2017, Sagat returned to film with the studio Men.com playing as Aquaman in a parody of the 2017 movie Justice League.

=== Non-pornographic ===
In 2009, he appeared as an extra in Saw VI.

Both L.A. Zombie and Homme au bain premiered at Locarno International Film Festival in Switzerland in 2010, making Sagat the only actor with two lead roles featured in two competition entries during the festival. L.A. Zombie was also due to be screened during the Melbourne International Film Festival in Australia but was banned due to a ruling by Australia's Film Classification Board.

Sagat starred in the 2026 film Jim Queen, which world premiered in Cannes Film Festival‘s Midnight Screenings program.

=== Documentaries ===
In 2007, he appeared with other personalities in Olivier Nicklaus documentary about nudity in culture entitled La nudité toute nue.

In March 2011, a documentary entitled Sagat: The Documentary, a joint Brenda & Lucy Co./ADL TV/Canal+ production exploring the Sagat persona and phenomenon on world culture trends.

=== Marketing, fashion and music ===
When German designer Bernhard Willhelm launched his first menswear collection during Paris Fashion Week, he chose Sagat to promote the event.

Sagat is involved in fashion photoshoots. American fashion photographer Terry Richardson made a military-themed photoshoot of Sagat.

In March 2012, he launched a musical project entitled Hadès with Sylvia Gobbel. The music video debuted in March 2011.

== Personal life ==
François Sagat was born in Cognac to French parents of Slovak ancestry. Sagat moved to Paris at the age of eighteen.

He is the cousin of English singer Alison Moyet. In 2007, Sagat said he is "200% gay". He currently lives in France. Sagat is known for his distinctive scalp tattoo.

== Discography ==
=== Album ===
Title	Details
Videoclub	Released: July 7, 2023; Label: Independent; Formats: CD, digital download, streaming

=== EPs ===
Title
Chamelia
(with Igor Dewe)
Details
- Released: October 26, 2018
- Label: Independent
- Formats: digital download, streaming
Notes

No.	Title	Length
1.	"Trust Me"	6:20
2.	"Spit on Me"	5:48
3.	"I Wonder"	5:20
4.	"TesYeux"	6:31

=== Singles ===
==== As lead artist ====
Year	Title	Album
2012	"Hadès" (with Sylvia Gobbel)	Non-album singles
2015	"Camera" (with Veronika)	Non-album singles
2018	"Trust Me" (with Igor Dewe)	Chamelia (EP)
2023	"Fairytail"	Videoclub
2023	"I Don't Want To Break Your Heart"	Videoclub
2023	"The Boys Club"	Videoclub

==== As featured artist ====
Year	Title	Album
2020	"Tell Me (B Urslef)" (with Cherylyn Barnes)	Non-album singles
2022	"Feelu" (with Cherylyn Barnes)	Non-album singles

== Filmography ==
=== Non-pornographic ===
==== Film ====
Year	Title	Role	Director	Notes
2007	La nudité toute nue	Himself	Olivier Nicklaus	Documentary
2009	Plan cul	Himself	Olivier Nicklaus	Short film
2010	L.A. Zombie	Zombie	Bruce LaBruce	Lead role
2010	Homme au bain (English: Man at Bath)	Emmanuel	Christophe Honoré	Lead role
2011	Sagat: The Documentary	Himself	Pascal Roche; Jérôme M. De Oliveira	Documentary
2014	Remember Me	Security man	Nicolas Martin	Short film
2026	Jim Queen	Pavel	Nicolas Athané and Marco Nguyen	Animated film

==== Television ====
Year	Title	Role	Director	Notes
2010	Multinauts	Himself	Jennifer Juniper Stratford	Television series

Music Videos

Year	Title	Artist(s)	Director	Ref.
2012	"Hadès"	François Sagat, Sylvia Gobbel	Franck Glenisson	
2013	"Hyper Reality"	Panteros666	Panteros666, Ines Marzat	
2015	"Camera"	Veronika Mudra	Yevgeniy Timokhin	
2017	"Bluecid"	Sevdaliza	Sevdaliza, Zahra Reijs	
2018	"Trust Me"	François Sagat, Igor Dewe	—	
2020	''Tell Me''	Cherylyn Barnes François Sagat	—	
2022	''Feelu''	Cherylyn Barnes François Sagat	—	
2023	"Feelu Pendu Remix''	Cherylyn Barnes François Sagat	—	
2023	"Marathon"	Bilal Hassani	Alexis Langlois	
2023	"Fairytail"	François Sagat	—	
2023	"I Don't Want To Break Your Heart"	François Sagat	—	

Advertisements

Year	Title	Notes
2009	Je mets une capote et du gel	A promotional advertisement for Yagg.com. It shows François Sagat showing how to use a condom and lubricant for safe sex. It was done by an initiative of the Institut national de prévention et d'éducation pour la santé. It was broadcast on World AIDS Day.

=== Pornographic ===
==== Director / Producer ====
- 2011: François Sagat's Incubus – Part 1
- 2012: François Sagat's Incubus – Part 2

==== Actor ====
Citébeur

- 2005: Wesh Cousin 5 – Relax man (featuring the first porn video of François Sagat)
- 2005: Wesh Cousin 6 – Cho bouillants
- 2005: Univers Black 1 – Matos de blackoss (at UniversBlack.com associated with Citébeur)
- 2006: Wesh Cousin 7 – C'est d'la balle

Diapopic

- 2005: François Sagat : Le DVD
- 2005: Pompiers mis à nu
- 2005: Pompiers mis à nu 2

Raging Stallion

- 2005: Manifesto
- 2005: Hard As Wood
- 2005: Knight After Night
- 2005: Hole Sweet Hole
- 2005: Bedroom Eyes
- 2006: Manhattan
- 2006: Fistpack 7: Twist My Arm
- 2006: Fistpack 8 : Elbow Room
- 2006: Centurion Muscle II – Alpha
- 2006: Escape From San Francisco
- 2006: Tough As Nails
- 2006: Arabesque
- 2006: Collin O'Neal's World of Men: Lebanon
- 2006: Humping Iron
- 2006: Stretch
- 2006: Apex
- 2007: Best in Hole
- 2007: Instinct
- 2007: Boners
- 2007: The Best of François Sagat – Volume 1
- 2007: The Best of François Sagat – Volume 2
- 2008: The Best of François Sagat – Volume 3
- 2008: Hairy Boyz 11
- 2009: Piss Off : Hardcore Fetish Series: Pissing #1
- 2009: Muscle Studs 2
- 2009: Fistpack 24: The Best of François Sagat: Fisting
- 2010: Hairy Boyz 15
- 2010: Inked Boyz 2

Titan Media

- 2007: Stretch
- 2007: Folsom Leather
- 2007: Shacked Up
- 2007: H2O
- 2007: SPY Quest 3
- 2007: Breathless
- 2007: Folsom Filth
- 2008: Telescope
- 2008: Breakers
- 2008: Fear
- 2008: Double Standard
- 2008: Telescope
- 2008: P.O.V.
- 2008: Funhouse
- 2009: OverDrive
- 2009: Full Access
- 2010: Search and Rescue
- 2010: Thrust
- 2011: François Sagat's Incubus – Part 1
- 2012: François Sagat's Incubus – Part 2

Falcon Studios

- 2009: Ringside
- 2017: The Trainer: No Excuses

Overload Releasing

- 2010: Cock Hungry Dick Pigs!

Men

- 2017: Justice League: A Gay XXX Parody
- 2017: Dream Fucker
- 2018: Sex God
- 2018: Uncut Legends

Raw Strokes Productions

- 2022: Best Of Knockout
- 2023: Best of RawStrokes.com 2
- 2024: Knockout Reloaded

== Awards and nominations ==
=== Results ===
Year	Award	Nomination	Work	Result	Ref.
2003	Grabby Awards	Best Art Direction	"Arabesque"	Nominated	
2003	Grabby Awards	Best Videography	"Arabesque"	Nominated	
2003	Grabby Awards	Best DVD Extras	"Arabesque"	Won	
2003	Grabby Awards	Best All-Sex Video	"Arabesque"	Won	
2003	Grabby Awards	Best Duo Sex Scene	"Arabesque" (with Huessein)	Nominated	
2003	David Awards (GAY-eLINE)	Best European Actor	Himself	Won	
2007	GayVN Awards	Best Performer of the Year	Himself	Won	
2007	GayVN Awards	Best Pro/Am Release	"Lebanon"	Won	
2007	Grabby Awards	Best Bottom	Himself	Nominated	
2007	Grabby Awards	Best Duo Sex Scene	"Bedroom Eyes" (with Kyle Lewis)	Nominated	
2007	Grabby Awards	Best Performer	Himself	Nominated	
2007	Grabby Awards	Best Three-Way Sex Scene	"Lebanon" (with Collin O'Neal, Jacko)	Nominated	
2007	Grabby Awards	Best Solo Sex Scene	"Manhattan"	Nominated	
2011	European Gay Porn Awards	Best Threesome Performance	"H2O" (with Steve Cruz, Rocky Torrez)	Won	
2011	GayVN Awards	Best Threesome	"Folsom Leather" (with Brendan Davies, Rick Van Sant)	Nominated	
2011	GayVN Awards	Best Leather Video	"Folsom Leather"	Won	
2015*	TLA Gay Awards	Best Hair	Himself	Won	
2019	HustlaBall Awards	Best European Performer	Himself	Won	
2024	The Wowie Awards	The Only On My OnlyFans Award, Best 18+ Social Presence	Himself	Nominated	
2027	XBIZ Awards	Gay Performer of the Year	Himself	Won	

== See also ==
- List of male performers in gay porn films

== Notes ==
- Beautiful blog: A Raging Stallion
- Beautiful blog: The Man Behind the Mask (part 2)
- Un Nouveau Idéal: François Sagat talks to Filep Notwary

Awards
Preceded by Gus Mattox	GayVN Awards for Performer of the Year; 2007	Succeeded by Jake Deckard
