= Alibi (Sevdaliza, Pabllo Vittar and Yseult song) =

Single by Sevdaliza, Pabllo Vittar and Yseult

from the album Heroina
- Language: Portuguese; English; Spanish; French
- Written: 2022–2024
- Released: 28 June 2024
- Recorded: 2024
- Genre: Alternative pop; funk carioca; reggaeton; bullerengue
- Length: 2:41
- Label: Twisted Elegance
- Composers: Sevdaliza; Mathias Janmaat; Nilusi Nissanka; Geovanne Lucas da Silva Aranha; Mucky; Rodrigo Gorky; Summer Disbray; Will Knox
- Lyricists: Sevda Alizadeh; Pabllo Vittar; Yseult Onguenet; Eyelar Mirzazadeh
- Producers: Sevdaliza; Mathias Janmaat; Mucky

Sevdaliza singles chronology
"Ride or Die, Pt. 2" (2024)	"Alibi" (2024)	"Alibi Pt. 2" (2024)

Pabllo Vittar singles chronology
"Cuba (Remix)" (2024)	"Alibi" (2024)	"Quem Manda em Mim" (2024)

Yseult singles chronology
"Bitch You Could Never" (2024)	"Alibi" (2024)	"Alibi Pt. 2" (2024)

Remix cover
- Cover of Alibi Pt. 2

Anitta singles chronology
"Get Up Bitch! Shake Ya Ass" (2024)	"Alibi Pt. 2" (2024)	"Paradise" (2024)

Jonita Gandhi singles chronology
"Hello" (2025)	"Alibi Pt. 3" (2025)

Rusha & Blizza singles chronology
"Zaar Zaar" (2025)	"Alibi Pt. 3" (2025)

Music video
- "Alibi" on YouTube

"Alibi" is a song by Iranian-Dutch singer Sevdaliza, Brazilian singer Pabllo Vittar and French singer-songwriter Yseult. It was released on 28 June 2024 through Twisted Elegance as the second single from Sevdaliza's third studio album, Heroina. It samples Colombian musician Magín Díaz's song "Rosa", a version of the Cuban son "Rosa, qué linda eres", first recorded by the Sexteto Habanero Godínez in 1918. Musically, "Alibi" is an alternative pop song with club-influenced production that incorporates elements of various Latin genres, including funk carioca, reggaeton, and bullerengue.

Commercially, "Alibi" peaked at number 15 on the Billboard Global 200 and reached the top 10 in Brazil, France, Greece, Hungary, Latvia, Lithuania, Luxembourg, Poland, Romania and Switzerland. In the United States, the song debuted at number 95 on the Billboard Hot 100, earning all three artists their first entries on the chart. Vittar became the second drag queen ever to chart on the Hot 100 after RuPaul. (Note: RuPaul has charted three songs on the Billboard Hot 100: "Supermodel (You Better Work)" (1993); "Don't Go Breaking My Heart", with Elton John (1994); and "Snapshot" (1996).)

A remix version of "Alibi" was released on 6 September 2024, with the addition of the Brazilian singer Anitta. A second remix of the song by Dutch DJ Tiësto followed on 29 November 2024. A third remix of "Alibi" was released on 25 November 2025, with the addition of the Indian-Canadian singer Jonita Gandhi and Indian production duo Rusha & Blizza.

== Background and release ==
"Alibi" is an "operatic" murder ballad. Music critics described it as a "club-focused" alternative pop song, though it also experiments with Latin rhythms such as funk carioca, reggaeton, and bullerengue. With lyrics sung in French, English, Spanish, and Portuguese, it incorporates ominous bass tones and a heavy syncopated beat. While each performer contributes with a verse in the song, the chorus samples the song "Rosa" by Colombian musician Magín Díaz. A song also performed by fellow Colombian artists Carlos Vives and Totó la Momposina, "Rosa" is a version of the Cuban son "Rosa, qué linda eres".

Before its commercial release, "Alibi" went viral globally on TikTok, earning over one million creations on the app. In less than three weeks, the song surpassed 35 million streams on Spotify.

== Reception ==
Rosie Long Decter, writing for Billboard Canada, described "Alibi" as an "enticing tribute to womanhood, with a menacing undertone." Josh Sharpe of BroadwayWorld saw the song as a "passionate and emotive continuation" of Sevdaliza's artistry in an "exploration of the divine female energy", amplified by "the shared experiences of all three artists".

== Charts ==
=== Weekly charts ===
Weekly chart performance for "Alibi"
Chart (2024–2025)	Peak position
Austria (Ö3 Austria Top 40)	14
Belarus Airplay (TopHit)	148
Belgium (Ultratop 50 Wallonia)	15
Brazil Hot 100 (Billboard)	5
Bulgaria Airplay (PROPHON)	8
Canada Hot 100 (Billboard)	46
CIS Airplay (TopHit)	52
Czech Republic Singles Digital (ČNS IFPI)	6
Dominican Republic Anglo Airplay (Monitor Latino)	2
Ecuador Anglo Airplay (Monitor Latino)	4
El Salvador Anglo Airplay (Monitor Latino)	1
France (SNEP)	9
Germany (GfK)	20
Global 200 (Billboard)	15
Greece International (IFPI)	2
Guatemala Anglo Airplay (Monitor Latino)	5
Honduras Anglo Airplay (Monitor Latino)	5
Hungary (Single Top 40)	6
India International (IMI)	15
Ireland (IRMA)	44
Israel (Mako Hitlist)	52
Italy (FIMI)	43
Latin America Anglo Airplay (Monitor Latino)	4
Kazakhstan Airplay (TopHit)	104
Latvia Streaming (LaIPA)	8
Lithuania (AGATA)	9
Luxembourg (Billboard)	5
Malaysia (Billboard)	11
Mexico Anglo Airplay (Monitor Latino)	10
Middle East and North Africa (IFPI)	14
Netherlands (Single Top 100)	55
New Zealand Hot Singles (RMNZ)	12
Panama Anglo Airplay (Monitor Latino)	9
Paraguay Anglo Airplay (Monitor Latino)	10
Peru Anglo Airplay (Monitor Latino)	4
Philippines (Philippines Hot 100)	83
Poland (Polish Streaming Top 100)	9
Portugal (AFP)	1
Puerto Rico Anglo Airplay (Monitor Latino)	7
Romania (Billboard)	4
Romania Airplay (UPFR)	1
Romania Airplay (Media Forest)	1
Romania TV Airplay (Media Forest)	2
Russia Airplay (TopHit)	176
Singapore (RIAS)	12
Slovakia Airplay (ČNS IFPI)	9
Slovakia Singles Digital (ČNS IFPI)	2
Spain (Promusicae)	85
Suriname (Nationale Top 40)	15
Sweden Heatseeker (Sverigetopplistan)	1
Switzerland (Schweizer Hitparade)	3
Turkey International Airplay (Radiomonitor Türkiye)	1
Ukraine Airplay (TopHit)	6
United Arab Emirates (IFPI)	13
UK Singles (Official Charts)	58
UK Indie (Official Charts)	9
US Billboard Hot 100	95
US Rhythmic Airplay (Billboard)	29
US World Digital Song Sales (Billboard)	2
Uruguay Anglo Airplay (Monitor Latino)	8
Venezuela Anglo Airplay (Monitor Latino)	8

=== Monthly charts ===
Monthly chart performance for "Alibi"
Chart (2024–2025)	Peak position
Brazil Streaming (Pro-Música Brasil)	7
CIS Airplay (TopHit)	59
Czech Republic (Singles Digitál Top 100)	7
Paraguay Airplay (SGP)	75
Romania Airplay (TopHit)	4
Slovakia (Rádio Top 100)	31
Slovakia (Singles Digitál Top 100)	3
Ukraine Airplay (TopHit)	9

=== Year-end charts ===
Year-end chart performance for "Alibi"
Chart (2024)	Position
Belgium (Ultratop 50 Wallonia)	71
CIS Airplay (TopHit)	197
France (SNEP)	45
Germany (GfK)	92
Global 200 (Billboard)	162
Romania Airplay (TopHit)	34
Portugal (AFP)	57
Romania Airplay (TopHit)	34
Switzerland (Schweizer Hitparade)	51
Ukraine Airplay (TopHit)	76

2025 year-end chart performance for "Alibi"
Chart (2025)	Position
Belgium (Ultratop 50 Wallonia)	196
CIS Airplay (TopHit)	198
Romania Airplay (TopHit)	33

=== Decade-end charts ===
20s Decade-end chart performance for "Alibi"
Chart (2020–2026)	Position
Romania Airplay (TopHit)	87

== Certifications ==
Certifications for "Alibi"
Region	Certification	Certified units/sales
Belgium (BRMA)	Gold	20,000^{‡}
France (SNEP)	Diamond	333,333^{‡}
Italy (FIMI)	Gold	50,000^{‡}
Spain (Promusicae)	Gold	30,000^{‡}
United States (RIAA)	Gold	500,000^{‡}
Streaming
Greece (IFPI Greece)	Platinum	2,000,000^{†}
^{‡} Sales+streaming figures based on certification alone.^{†} Streaming-only figures based on certification alone.
