= Rosa 'Sunset Celebration' =

Hybrid tea rose cultivar

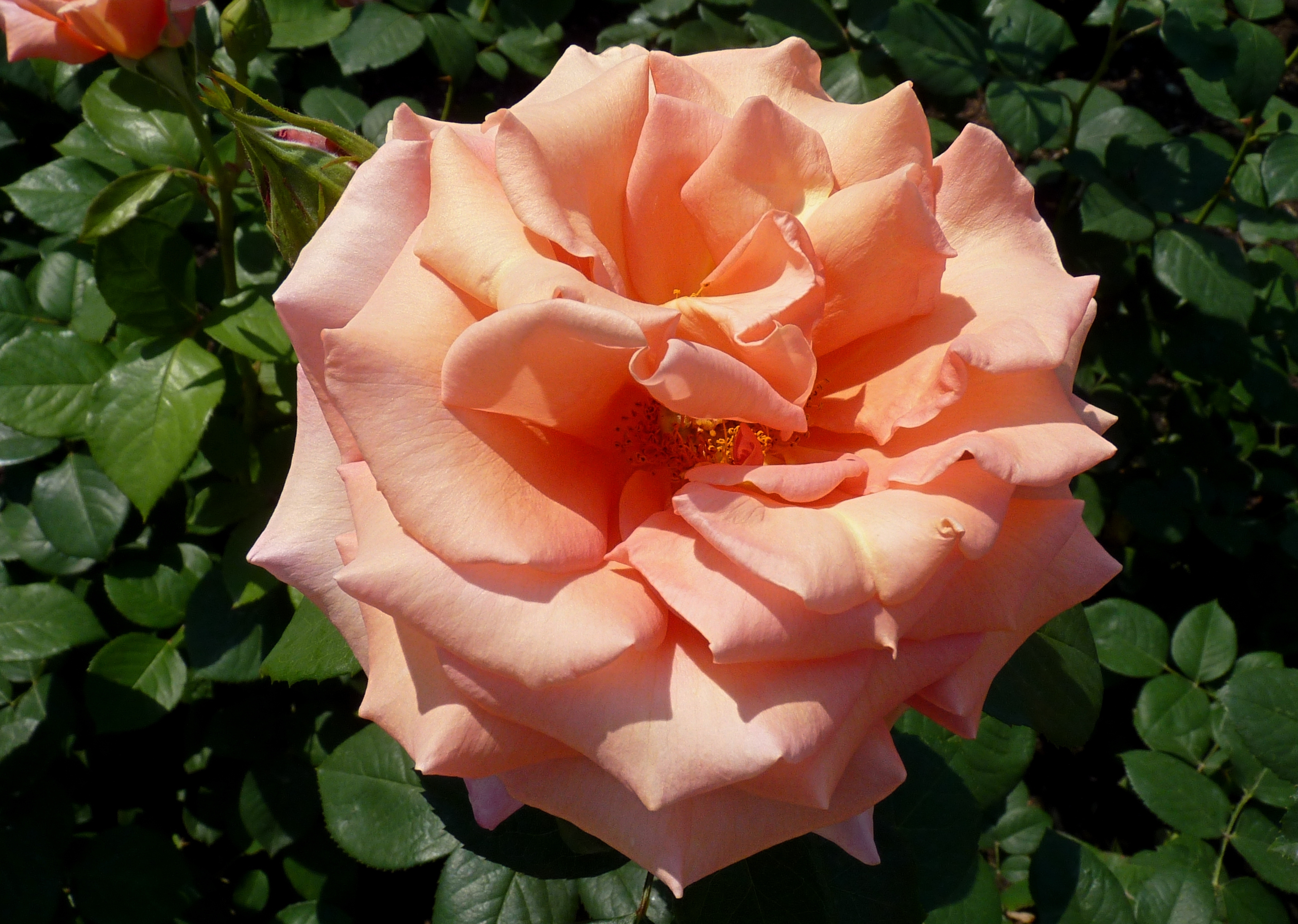
- Rosa 'Sunset Celebration'
- Genus: Rosa hybrid
- Hybrid parentage: 'Pot o' Gold' x (Unnamed seedling x 'Cheshire Life')
- Cultivar group: Hybrid tea
- Cultivar: FRYxotic
- Marketing names: 'Warm Wishes', 'Sunset Celebration', 'Jolie Mome'
- Breeder: Fryer
- Origin: Great Britain, 1994

Rosa 'Sunset Celebration', (a.k.a. FRYxotic), is a hybrid tea rose cultivar bred by Gareth Fryer. It was introduced into the United States by Weeks Roses in 1994 as 'Sunset Celebration'. It is also commonly known under the marketing name, 'Warm Wishes'. The rose was named an All-America Rose Selections winner in 1998.

== Description ==
'Sunset Celebration' is a medium-tall, upright shrub, 4 to 6 ft (121—182 cm) in height with a 2 to 3 ft (60—91 cm) spread. Blooms are 5—6 in (12—15 cm) in diameter, with a petal count of 35 to 40. Bloom form is high centered to cupped. Its color is a blend of apricot and pink. In warmer weather, the flowers fade to pink and cream. Blooms have a moderate, fruity fragrance, and are generally borne singly, on long stems, or in small clusters. 'Sunset Celebration' blooms in flushes repeatedly from spring through fall, and is very disease resistant. The shrub has large, semi-glossy, medium green foliage. The plant is recommended for USDA zone 7b and warmer.

== Child plants ==
'Sunset Celebration' was used to hybridize the following rose varieties:

- Rosa 'All Dressed Up', (2018)
- Rosa 'Love Song 2011', (2011)
- Rosa 'Marilyn Monroe', (2002)
- Rosa 'Sunstruck', (2004)
- Rosa 'We Salute You', (2005)

== Awards ==
- Belfast Gold Medal, (1996)
- Golden Rose of the Hague, (1997)
- All-America Rose Selections (AARS) winner, USA, (1998)

== See also ==
- Garden roses
- Rose Hall of Fame
- List of Award of Garden Merit roses
