= Sagat: The Documentary =

- Poster of DVD release
- Directed by: Pascal Roche; Jérôme M. De Oliveira
- Starring: François Sagat
- Country of origin: France
- Original language: French

Production
- Producers: ADL TV; Brenda & Lucy Co.
- Running time: 80 minutes

Original release
- Release: March 1, 2011

Sagat: The Documentary stylized as SAGAT: The Documentary, SAGAT - Uncut or just SAGAT (in French: Sagat: le documentaire) is a 2011 documentary on pornographic actor and gay icon François Sagat about his persona and impact on world culture directed by Pascal Roche and Jérôme M. De Oliveira. It was produced by ADL TV and after an idea by Brenda & Lucy Co.

== Screenings ==
It premiered on the French Canal+ station on 1 March 2011. The United States premiere was at the Museum of Arts and Design in New York on 18 November 2011. It also showed at a number of gay film festivals and documentary film festivals.

== Synopsis ==
The 60-minutes documentary follows Sagat's working career with a rare behind-the-scenes glimpse into the cult actor's performances, and gives plenty of testimonials about Sagat's impact. Most of the shooting was done in Cognac, Paris and San Francisco. The film contains many quotations from other notables from the industry including Chi Chi LaRue who compares Sagat with the pop diva Madonna, and filmmaker Bruce LaBruce who calls Sagat "the Marilyn Monroe of gay porn – Marilyn had her breasts, François has the ass".

In this uncensored docu-portrait, the pornstar is not afraid to talk about his fears or failures. He declares towards the end of the documentary: "Je pense que je vais arrêter le porno" (meaning: I think I'll stop doing porno films).

== Reception ==
The documentary received very positive reviews including one from the French gay magazine Têtu who interviewed him. The magazine also wrote in its review: "This film is sexy and moving, the sex icon presents itself extremely sensitive and profound".
