= La nudité toute nue =

- Written by: Olivier Nicklaus
- Directed by: Olivier Nicklaus
- Country of origin: France
- Original language: French

Production
- Producers: Mademoiselle Agnès, David Berdah
- Cinematography: David Chizallet
- Running time: 52 minutes

Original release
- Network: Canal+
- Release: 18 July 2007

La nudité toute nue is a 2007 French television documentary film directed by Olivier Nicklaus. It was first broadcast on 18 July 2007 on French television channel Canal+ during a special "all nude" day of programming on the channel presented by Mademoiselle Agnès.

== Synopsis ==
In La nudité toute nue (English translation "Nudity exposed"), director Olivier Nicklaus travels all over Europe (Paris, Berlin, London, Amsterdam to meet various personalities filmed in the nude. Characters include nude performers in striptease or in media, art, activism to nude hedonist (naturism, yoga) or therapeutic or spiritual nudity.

Guests interviewed included photographer of nude models Terry Richardson, Vincent Bethell who launched The Freedom to be Yourself movement, designer Tom Ford, philosopher Jean-Luc Nancy, the transsexual icon Amanda Lepore and popular gay pornographic actor François Sagat.

== Cast ==
- Amira Casar
- Arielle Dombasle
- Amanda Lepore
- François Sagat
- Philipp Tanzer
- Tom Ford
- Louise de Ville
- Terry Richardson
- Velvet d'Amour
- Jean-Luc Nancy
- Emmanuel Pierrat
- Spencer Tunick
- Boris Charmatz
- Élisabeth Lebovici
- Philippe Colomb
- Pauline Delhomme
- Harry Boudchicha
- Noémie Ventura
- Ernesto Sarezale
- Anne-Marie Corre
- Augustin Legrand
