= L.A. Zombie =

- Film poster
- Directed by: Bruce LaBruce
- Written by: Bruce LaBruce
- Produced by: Arno Rok; Robert Felt; Bruce LaBruce; Jörn Hartmann; Jürgen Brüning; Matthias Von Fistenberg
- Starring: François Sagat
- Cinematography: James Carman
- Edited by: Jörn Hartmann
- Music by: Kevin D. Hoover
- Production companies: Wurstfilm; PPV Networks; Dark Alley Media
- Release date: January 30, 2010 (Berlin)
- Running time: 63 minutes (edited); 103 minutes
- Countries: Germany; United States
- Language: English
- Budget: $100,000

L.A. Zombie is a 2010 gay zombie porn film written and directed by Bruce LaBruce. It premiered in competition at Locarno International Film Festival in Switzerland in 2010. The film exists in two versions, a 63-minute cut version showcased at various festivals and theatres and a 103-minute directors cut DVD release containing hardcore gay pornography not seen in the cut version.

== Plot ==
An extraterrestrial zombie (who may just be a schizophrenic vagrant, and whose appearance constantly shifts between that of a corpse, a tusked beast with irregular genitals, and a normal man) emerges from the sea, and begins making its way to Los Angeles. A motorist notices the zombie walking along a deserted road, picks it up, and dies in an accident moments later. The zombie recovers from the crash, and reanimates the driver by penetrating a wound in the man's chest with its monstrous penis. The ghouls have sex, which ends with the first zombie ejaculating black semen, and stumbling away as the motorist sits among the wreckage of his vehicle, in awe of what has just transpired.

The zombie reaches Los Angeles, and after perusing shopping carts full of discarded objects, ventures to the L.A. River, where it sees a white collar criminal being shot to death by his partner. The zombie drags the deceased lawbreaker to a soiled mattress, and resurrects him via coitus with the bullet wounds in the man's back. The undead criminal and the zombie have sex, which is followed by the zombie wandering away, washing itself, and going to a café, where it purchases a cup of coffee.

The zombie steals some clothing, and finds the dumped body of a gang member who was shot in the head. The zombie brings the hood back to life by molesting the hole in his forehead, and has sex with him. A group of homeless are then shown meeting at an abandoned sofa, but flee when they discover the body of a fellow bum who had overdosed in a cardboard box. The zombie stumbles upon the scene, and after ignoring a homeless man who is merely passed out, resurrects and engages in sex with the dead one.

In a BDSM dungeon, four men have an orgy, and later all of them are killed by a pair of drug dealers when they refuse to pay for low-quality cocaine. The zombie witnesses the massacre through a window, enters the building, and instigates a gory circle jerk after bringing back the shot leathermen. The zombie then goes to a cemetery, cries tears and blood as it reminisces about its lovers, and digs up a grave as it begins to storm.

== Cast ==
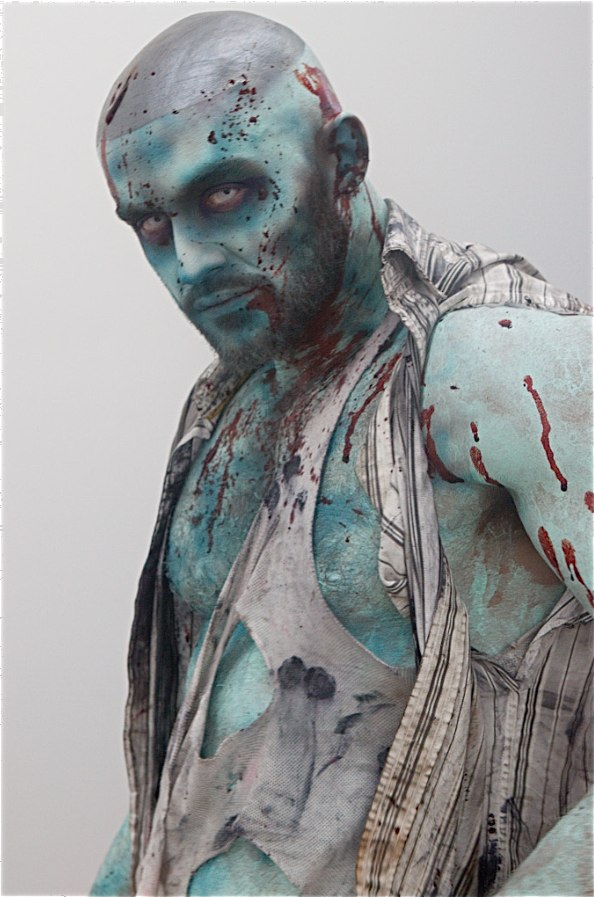
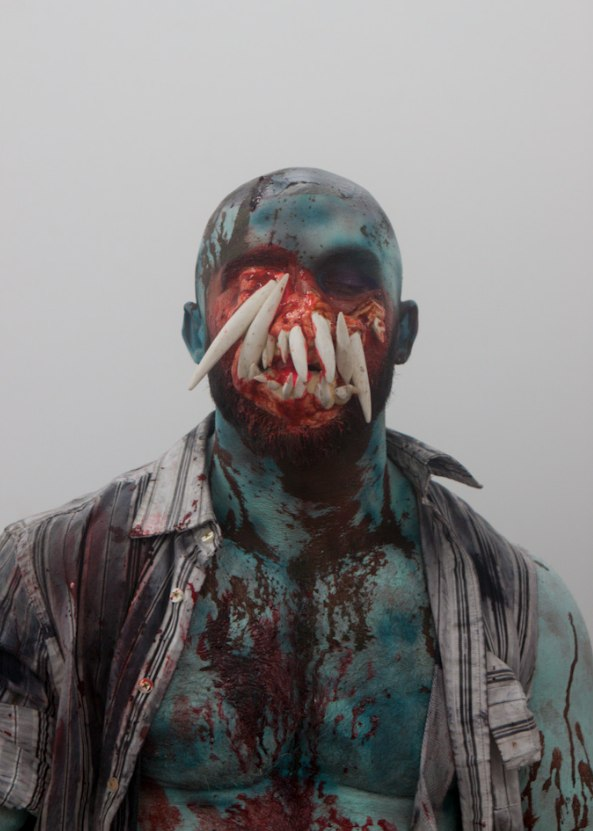
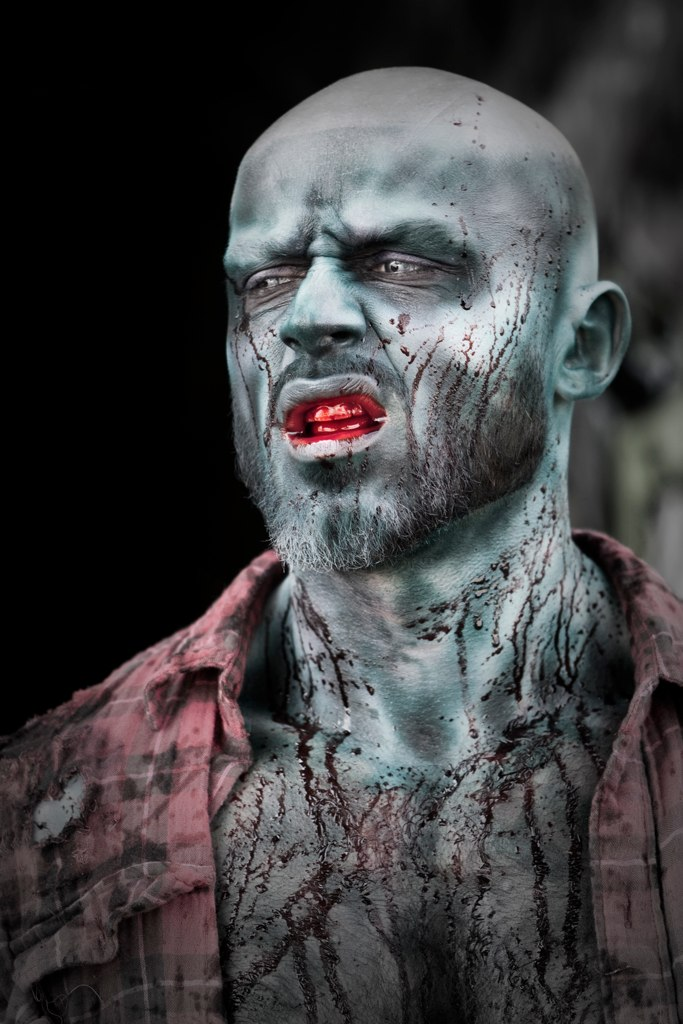
François Sagat on set
- François Sagat as Zombie
- Rocco Giovanni as Car Accident Victim
- Wolf Hudson as Shooting Victim
- Eddie Diaz as Dead Guy Dumped out of Car
- Andrew James as Andrew
- Matthew Rush as Drug Deal Victim #1
- Erik Rhodes as Drug Deal Victim #2
- Francesco D'Macho as Drug Deal Victim #3
- Adam Killian as Drug Deal Victim #4
- Tony Ward as Homeless Person #1
- Santino Rice as Homeless Person #2
- D.J. Sly as Johnny
- Tim Kuzma as L.A. River Shooter
- Trevor Wayne as Drug Dealer #1
- Deadlee as Drug Dealer #2
- N.asa as Homeless Man with Shopping Carts

== Production ==
L.A. Zombie began production in 2009, filming on location in Los Angeles. One scene was shot at the L.A. River, in the exact location of the "Thunder Road" race sequence from the musical Grease. The film was first released as a soft-core independent feature and then a gay pornographic film at a later date.

== Release ==
On January 30, 2010, the film had a sneak preview at the Peres Project Exhibit in Berlin, Germany as part of the show L.A. Zombie: The Movie That Would Not Die. A collection of silk screened portraits by Bruce LaBruce from the film were also shown at the exhibit, mostly pictures showcasing Sagat as a zombie. The Locarno International Film Festival screened L.A. Zombie in competition from August 4–16 of 2010.

The film was due to have its second and third screening as part of the Melbourne International Film Festival (MIFF) in Australia on August 7 and 8, 2010. However, the Australian Film Classification Board advised festival organisers that the film could not be screened as it was likely to be refused classification. Under Australian law, films that are refused classification may not be imported, sold, or distributed, which precludes screening at public events. In defiance of this censorship, the Melbourne Underground Film Festival, which occurs concurrently with MIFF but screens films regarded as too controversial for the mainstream event, held an illegal screening of L.A. Zombie on August 29. While police did not attend or stop the screening on the night, they did raid the home of director Richard Wolstencroft on the morning of November 11, 2010. Wolstencroft admitted to police that an August 29 screening had occurred, but claimed to have destroyed the only copy of the film afterwards. The court ruled that he pay $750 to the Royal Children's Hospital.

L.A. Zombie held its UK premiere at the Raindance Film Festival in London on October 1, 2010. It was reported that "at least one-third of the audience walked out stupefied".

TLA Releasing picked up the U.S. release for the film, and set November 12, 2010 as the DVD date. The DVD release is an uncut version, longer than the film festival release's runtime.

In New Zealand, the film was first screened at the Out Takes LGBT film festival in Auckland and Wellington. Unlike Australia, New Zealand's Office of Film and Literature Classification gave the film an R18 certificate, which means that it can be screened as long as the audience is aged eighteen and over. The Society for Promotion of Community Standards called for review of the decision, while GayNZ.com welcomed its release. SPCS failed to have the film prohibited after the review and it was resultantly screened at the Out Takes film festival in Auckland and Wellington in early June 2011.

== Reception ==
Fangoria referred to L.A. Zombie as a "strangely introspective indie film", and concluded that it was well done and thoughtful, and that "The joy of the film is that it doesn't do what you expect it to, yet it always seems sincere". Film Forward stated "This sometimes sexy, sometimes chilling horror-porn-art house piece has a strong message, yet it feels like Bruce LaBruce light. There's none of the raw energy that made The Raspberry Reich (2004) a revelation, and there's not enough of the thought-provoking, satirical humor that embodied his last one, Otto; or Up with Dead People (2008). According to Variety, rather than combining art-show, campy horror, and porn movies, LaBruce "just turned out a confused mess", and "it's hard to imagine regular filmgoers being especially disturbed...only the most sheltered viewers will feel the notoriety is deserved."

A score of two stars out of five was awarded by Moria, which wrote "One suspects the true purpose behind L.A. Zombie is that Bruce LaBruce is less a pornographic filmmaker than a gleeful agitator who latches onto pornography solely for its outrage value". Next Projection gave the film 6 out of 10 stars or "okay" rating. The Torontoist found the film exploitative of L.A.'s homeless, giving it zero stars and beginning its review with "A spiritless, pointless amalgam of gory zombie picture and hardcore porn, L.A. Zombie is the confluence of two cultural crosscurrents that nobody asked for. Shot on crummy-looking digital and realized by the incompetent Bruce LaBruce, it looks like a homework assignment cranked out by the insufferably pretentious kid in the Tom Savini master class".

=== Awards ===
Year	Award	Category	Result
2010	Locarno Festival	Golden Leopard (Bruce LaBruce)	Nominated
2010	Melbourne Underground Film Festival	Best Foreign Director (Bruce LaBruce)	Won

== See also ==
- Andy Warhol's Frankenstein
