= Zombie pornography =

Pornography involving zombies

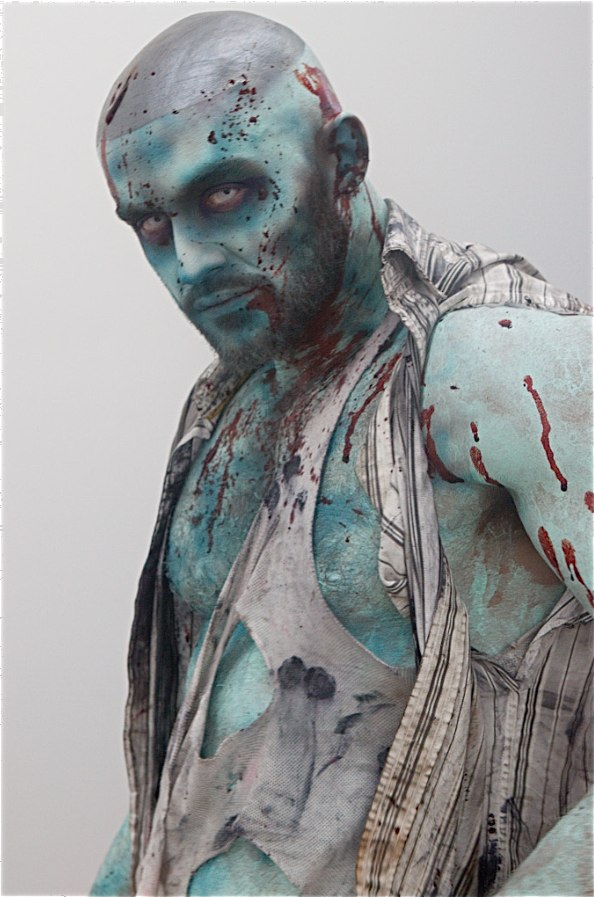
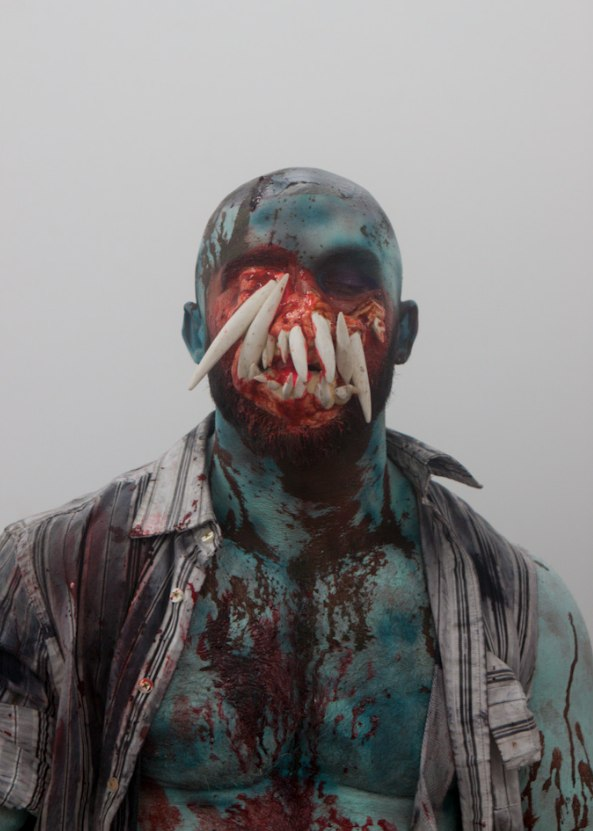
François Sagat on the set of L.A. Zombie

Zombie pornography is a subgenre of pornography involving zombies, a type of undead being with uncontrollable appetites but no personal desire. Films in the subgenre emerged during a surge in the 1980s Italian sexploitation industry and saw minor release in the United States the next decade, but their use of zombie sex was primarily to shock the viewer. Film-maker Bruce LaBruce released Otto; or, Up with Dead People (2008) and L.A. Zombie (2010), two prominent gay zombie porn films seen by scholars as subverting homophobic tropes about gay life; in the films, zombification is physically similar to AIDS, a disease typically associated with gay men. While zombie porn may be appealing to some because it breaks taboos related to necrophilia, and plays with male viewers' fear of castration, zombies are also ferocious creatures that can destroy their sexual partners.

== Background ==
Zombies have been part of American popular culture since the early twentieth century, and their early depictions were based on those of Haitian and African folklore. For the earliest depictions, zombies were not truly undead beings, but living people without consciousness, animated by magic. Modern American zombies are based on Night of the Living Dead (1968), a film by George A. Romero called the "modern zombie ur-text" by porn studies scholar Shaka McGlotten. According to McGlotten, the zombie is associated with Haiti through the Western world's reactions to the Haitian Revolution, where enslaved people broke free from French rule and challenged the dominant economic system, which was seen "as a matter of bloodshed ... and boundless material destruction".

== Emergence and examples ==
In the 1980s, zombie porn began to emerge during a rise in Italian sexploitation releases, such as in Joe D'Amato's film Erotic Nights of the Living Dead (1980). The first true pornographic film involving zombies was Orgasmo Esotico (Erotic Orgasm), released in 1982 and directed by D'Amato and Mario Siciliano. In the 1990s, a few obscure American zombie porn films were released, including The Necro Files (1997) and Zombie Ninja Gangbangers (Jeff Cantauri, 1998). The predominant theme of these films was cannibalism, and zombie sexuality was not a primary focus; its instrumental value was instead to further shock the viewer.

Zombie porn exclusively depicted straight sex until 2008, when Vidkid Timo released At Twilight Come the Flesh-Eaters, a gay imitation of Night of the Living Dead. Bruce LaBruce produced two gay zombie porn films, Otto; or, Up with Dead People (2008) and L.A. Zombie (2010). Otto; or, Up with Dead People is about Otto, a gay zombie with amnesia, and Medea Yarn, a film-maker who wants to create the film Up with Dead People, a gay zombie porn film which depicts zombie sex spurring a revolution against the living. L.A. Zombie revolves around a central zombie (played by François Sagat), who wanders throughout Los Angeles, "fucking dead young men back to life". Sagat's character has sexual relations with the dead—through masturbating over them, or penetrating their flesh wounds and anuses with his barbed penis—and his ejaculate reanimates them.

When L.A. Zombie was the subject of classification in New Zealand, the classification board said that because the film's protagonist becomes "increasingly lonely, isolated and monstrous" because of his sexual activity, it did not "normalise" having sex with dead people (necrophilia). As a result, it was not banned under obscenity laws. In contrast, the Australian classification board banned the film a few weeks before it was scheduled to show at the Melbourne International Film Festival (MIFF), and the MIFF could not screen it. In response, a clandestine showing was done by the Melbourne Underground Film Festival on 29 August 2010. While this screening was illegal, Australian authorities did not raid the underground festival, and instead searched the director's home and ordered him to donate $750 to a children's hospital.

== Analysis ==
James J. Ward, a professor at Cedar Crest College, suggests that zombie porn's transgressions of the taboos against necrophilia and male viewers' fear of castration may be appealing for some. At the same time, he argues that because zombie sex "raises the likelihood of" participants being literally destroyed, because zombies carry filth and disease, and because the zombie is ontologically blank—they have "no awareness and affect" and are driven by "the most primitive and carnal of all desires" (to eat)—zombie porn remains largely unappealing. He concludes that zombie porn is neither new nor alluring. Feminist philosopher Kelly Oliver writes that zombie porn, like snuff pornography, is a kind of "pseudo-necrophilia"—altogether similar to rape—that reflects some men's aggressive sexual attitudes. The film Deadgirl (2008; sometimes labeled a kind of torture pornography), where a zombie woman is turned into a sex slave and repeatedly raped, is one example given by Oliver and horror researcher Steve Jones.

According to queer studies scholar Jasmine McGowan, Otto and L.A. Zombie are transgressive films because they "invert the homophobic tropes of disease and contagion". The physical manifestations of disease in the zombie—sores, wasting, rotting flesh—are similar in some respects to the progression of AIDS, which is a disease associated with homosexuality. McGlotten wrote that LaBruce's films (both about gay zombie sex) evoke thoughts not only of death, but also life, and that they posit a theory that "some kinds of death ... may be worse than others, and some are animating or reanimating". They say this contradictory stance is reminiscent of the scholarly work of Leo Bersani, Lee Edelman, and Tim Dean, all of whom "have sought ... to recuperate" the associations between gay sexuality and death. They stress, however, that LaBruce's films are more hopeful than theories like Edelman's—theories built out of gay people rejecting social life—because they offer alternatives (such as public sex communities), similar to the queer art of failure, a concept by queer theorist Jack Halberstam.

Scholarly analysis of the subgenre is, according to zombie studies scholar Sarah Juliet Lauro, limited because it does not take into consideration the Haitian origins of the figure. She says figures like zombie matelas (mattress zombies), a Haitian class of zombie sex slaves, are informative in understanding the possible extent of agency in zombie porn.

== See also ==
- Erotic horror
- Monster erotica
- Category:Fiction about human–zombie romance
