= The Calling (Sevdaliza EP) =

EP by Sevdaliza
- Released: 30 March 2018
- Length: 30:13
- Label: Twisted Elegance
- Producers: Mucky; Sevdaliza

Sevdaliza chronology
ISON (2017)	The Calling (2018)	Shabrang (2020)

Singles from The Calling
- 1. "Soul Syncable" Released: 31 January 2018; 2. "Human Nature" Released: 27 February 2018

The Calling is the third extended play by Dutch-Iranian artist Sevdaliza. It was released 27 March 2018 by Twisted Elegance. The cover was shot by Yann Weber.

The EP is 7 tracks long and was supported by the singles "Soul Syncable" and "Human Nature". The latter track would later be reworked and appear on Sevdaliza's second studio album Shabrang.

== Background and release ==
On 31 January, Sevdaliza released the lead single from The Calling, "Soul Syncable". It was released on the day of the first super blue moon in 150 years. Writing in third person, Sevdaliza spoke about the track in a press release:

These are glimpses of her supernatural realm, where she is a vessel. With healing songs to either lift curses or move onto the next life, collecting masks as a memento in the process. Her inner guidance comes from the collected, ultimately channeling the supreme self.

On 27 February, Sevdaliza released the second single from the EP "Human Nature". Similar to the release of "Soul Syncable", "Human Nature" was released on the day of the arrival of the Black Moon, a phenomenon that occurs once every 20 years. She also announced the release of the EP that same day.

The EP received a digital release on 30 March, as well as a limited vinyl release on 21 April as part of Record Store Day 2018. The vinyl was later made available for purchase on Sevdaliza's website.

== Critical reception ==
Professional ratings
Review scores
Source	Rating
Atwood Magazine	6.7/10
Pitchfork	7.0/10

The Calling received fairly positive reviews from music critics.

Ilana Kalish from Atwood Magazine described the EP as "a complex and spiritual soundtrack, worthy of this lofty life affirming journey". She notes on the lyricism presented on the EP, "Sevdaliza's soul searching lyrics whisper seductively, seeking that place in your soul where they make the most sense", as well as, "undulating twists and turns of The Calling's trip-hop soundscape."

Katherine St. Asaph from Pitchfork states, "the Dutch-Iranian singer continues to mine trip-hop for inspiration, with a voice that evokes the genre's greats." She notes that Sevdaliza's voice draws from influences such as, "Tracey Thorn's richness, Nicola Hitchcock's tremolo", also stating, "while adding distinctive melisma evoking her Iranian roots." She points out the track "Soothsayer", which she says, "has moments that spool out slowly, very much like parts of Björk's Arca-produced Vulnicura." She concludes the review by saying, "The highs are high, the lows barely exist, and the rest is finely crafted: the work of a mind that has styled its interior down to the most immaculate detail."

Jem Aswad from Variety also points out influences, noting, "occasional quavering Portisheadian moods", "FKA Twig-ish elements", and, "swooning string arrangements that recall Siouxsie & the Banshees circa 'Dazzle'". She points out several tracks on the EP, including "Energ1", where "a particularly beautiful moment occurs in the middle of... when a driving beat underpins an aching string quartet, then the beat starts to fracture as her voice, treated to sound ghost-like, floats in", and "Observer", which she states is "one of the most commercial-leaning songs she's ever done", while noting "its relative normal-ness is as disorienting as the odder tracks that precede it." She summarises, "It all gets very high-concept at times... but while it commands the listener's attention, it's rarely jarring or unpleasant. A constantly shifting soundscape of strings, beats and voices, The Calling finds Sevdaliza morphing initially familiar sounds into ever-odder new shapes."

== Track listing ==
All tracks written by Sevdaliza; all tracks produced by Mucky and Sevdaliza.

No.	Title	Length
1.	"Soul Syncable"	3:26
2.	"5d"	3:19
3.	"Soothsayer"	5:17
4.	"Energ1"	4:06
5.	"Human Nature"	5:53
6.	"Voodoov"	4:07
7.	"Observer"	4:05
Total length:		30:13

Notes

- The length of "Human Nature" depicted refers to the original version, which now only appears on physical editions of The Calling. The updated version is 5:00, which includes added string sections and excludes a spoken word outro.

== Personnel ==
Credits adapted from the album's liner notes.

- Sevdaliza – creative executive production, mixing
- Mucky – technical executive production, mixing, mastering
- Mihai Puscoiu – string arrangements
- Leon Den Engelsen – additional keys, additional synthesizers
- Thijs Lodewijk – additional synthesizers

== Release history ==
Region	Date	Format	Label	Ref.
Various	30 March 2018	Digital download	Twisted Elegance	
Various	21 April 2018	LP	Music on Vinyl	
