= Rosa 'Marilyn Monroe' =

Hybrid tea rose cultivar

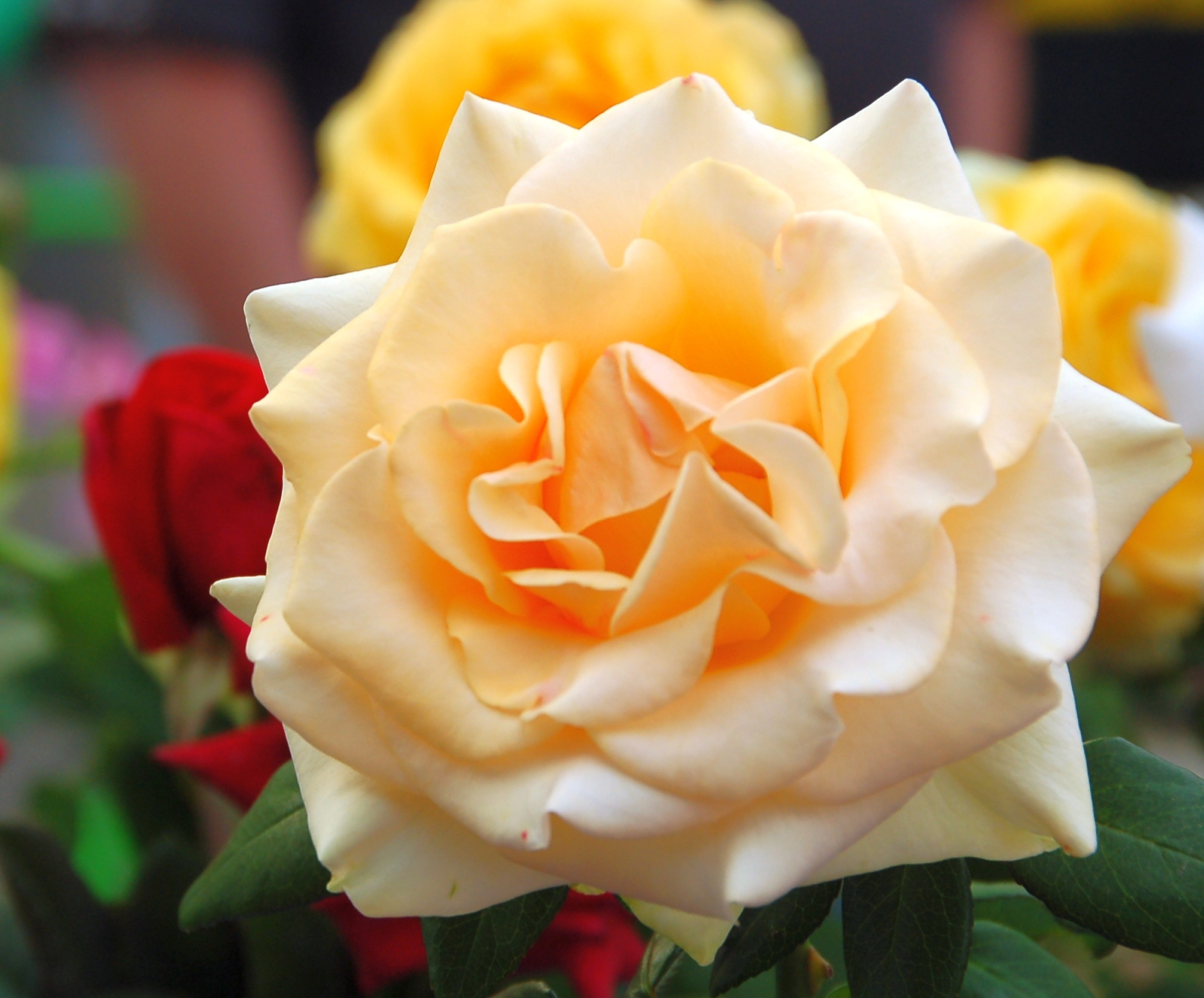
- Rosa 'Marilyn Monroe'
- Genus: Rosa hybrid
- Hybrid parentage: 'Sunset Celebration' x 'St. Patrick'
- Cultivar group: Hybrid tea
- Cultivar: WEKsunspat
- Breeder: Carruth
- Origin: United States, 2002

Rosa 'Marilyn Monroe' (a.k.a. WEKsunspat' ) is an apricot blend hybrid tea rose cultivar, bred by Tom Carruth in 2002. The plant was created from stock parents, 'Sunset Celebration' and 'St. Patrick'. The cultivar was awarded a Portland Gold Medal in 2006.

== Description ==
'Marilyn Monroe' is a medium-tall, upright shrub, 4 to 6 ft (121—182 cm) in height with a 2 to 3 ft (60—91 cm) spread. Blooms are large, 4—5 in (10—12 cm) in diameter, with 26 to 40 petals. Flowers are borne mostly solitary or in small clusters, and have a globular, high-centered bloom form. Buds are pointed and ovoid. The flowers are a creamy apricot blend that show an outer wash of green when they first open. The rose has a mild citrus fragrance and medium, semi-glossy, dark green foliage. 'Marilyn Monroe' is a vigorous grower and very disease resistant. It blooms continually from spring through fall. The plants does well in USDA zone 6b and warmer. It is an excellent rose for hot weather.

== Awards ==
- Portland Gold Medal, (2006)

== See also ==
- Garden roses
- Rose Hall of Fame
- List of Award of Garden Merit roses
