= ISON (album) =

Studio album by Sevdaliza
- Released: 26 April 2017
- Recorded: 2015–2017
- Studio: SLM Studios, Soundkings (Rotterdam, Netherlands)
- Genre: Trip hop; alternative R&B; avant-pop
- Length: 65:55
- Label: Twisted Elegance
- Producer: Mucky; Sevdaliza

Sevdaliza chronology
| Children of Silk (2015) | ISON (2017) | The Calling (2018) |

Singles from ISON
- 1. "Human" Released: 17 November 2016; 2. "Hero" Released: 4 April 2017; 3. "Hubris" Released: 12 April 2017; 4. "Marilyn Monroe" Released: 14 April 2017

Professional ratings
Review scores
| Source | Rating |
|---|---|
| Pitchfork | 7.7/10 |
| PopMatters | 8/10 stars |
| Soul Feeder | 7.5/10 |

ISON is the debut studio album by Iranian-Dutch singer Sevdaliza. It was released on 26 April 2017 by Twisted Elegance. The album is named after Comet ISON, a sungrazing comet. It includes two songs from Sevdaliza's second extended play, Children of Silk (2015), "Amandine Insensible" and "Marilyn Monroe", the latter of which was released as the album's fourth single on 14 April 2017. "Human" was released as the lead single on 17 November 2016, which was followed by "Hero" as the second single on 4 April 2017 and "Hubris" as the third single on 12 April.

According to Sarah Sitkin, who designed the cover art, the cover depicts Sevdaliza as the mother to herself, to her past lives, and to the album's 16 songs. On 21 November 2017, ISON was reissued digitally with the bonus track "Hear My Pain Heal", for which an accompanying music video premiered on the same day.

== Composition ==
PopMatters viewed the album as "a headfirst dive into the downtempo", noting elements of trip hop, "smokey jazz", and "styles too unique to name before ending with". Pitchfork described ISON as "a modern-day trip hop album built on minimal breakbeats and heavy layers of orchestration", while stating Sevdaliza "switches between the stately inflection of a classic jazz singer backed by strings and the brassy nerve of a digital-age R&B artist flexing and cooing over the beat." NPR Music wrote that the album navigates "trip-hop, industrial R&B and a strain of dubstep that's more soul than shuffle." The Fader stated the album consists of "16 trip-hop inflected tracks". SLUG Magazine commented that the album "has stuck closely to her previous work of trip-hop/electronic EP releases", while comparing certain tracks to those of Radiohead and Beyoncé.

GIGsoup stated: "The music Sevdaliza creates has repeatedly been likened to 'alternative R&B' artists such as FKA Twigs and Kelela, and while not entirely unfair, such comparisons only tell part of the story. There's certainly no shortage of industrial-flavoured electronics to be found on ISON, however, these are also combined with trip hop beats, orchestral arrangements, subtle keys, stunningly agile vocals and deeply reflective lyrics, all of which are woven together into a rich and detailed tapestry", adding that "while similarities with the work of FKA Twigs and Kelela can be found on the likes of 'Hero' and 'Human', it's the influence of Portishead which looms largest over the album." They also mentioned that the influence of Björk is notable within the orchestral arrangements, which gives "a subtle hint" of her 1997 album, Homogenic.

== Track listing ==
All tracks are written by Sevdaliza and produced by Mucky and Sevdaliza, except "Angel", produced by Mucky.

| No. | Title | Music | Length |
|---|---|---|---|
| 1. | "Shahmaran" | Sevdaliza; Mucky | 5:04 |
| 2. | "Libertine" | Sevdaliza; Mucky; Mihai Puscoiu | 3:49 |
| 3. | "Marilyn Monroe" | Sevdaliza; Mucky; Joel Dieleman | 3:29 |
| 4. | "Hubris" | Sevdaliza; Mucky; Dieleman | 4:05 |
| 5. | "Amandine Insensible" | Sevdaliza; Mucky; Dieleman | 4:14 |
| 6. | "Hero" | Sevdaliza; Mucky; Puscoiu | 3:59 |
| 7. | "Scarlette" | Sevdaliza; Mucky; Puscoiu | 3:12 |
| 8. | "Bluecid" | Sevdaliza; Mucky | 4:29 |
| 9. | "Loves Way" | Sevdaliza; Dieleman | 6:54 |
| 10. | "Human" | Sevdaliza; Mucky | 3:12 |
| 11. | "Do You Feel Real" | Sevdaliza | 2:29 |
| 12. | "The Language of Limbo" | Sevdaliza; Mucky; Dieleman | 3:47 |
| 13. | "Replaceable" | Sevdaliza; Dieleman; Mucky | 3:54 |
| 14. | "Grace" | Sevdaliza; Mucky | 3:56 |
| 15. | "When I Reside" | Sevdaliza; Mucky | 2:19 |
| 16. | "Angel" | Sevdaliza; Leon Den Engelsen | 7:03 |
| Total length: | | | 65:55 |

Digital reissue bonus track
| No. | Title | Length |
|---|---|---|
| 17. | "Hear My Pain Heal" | 3:57 |
| Total length: | | 69:52 |

== Personnel ==
Credits adapted from the liner notes of ISON.

- Sevdaliza – vocals (all tracks); production (tracks 1–15); arrangement (tracks 1, 2, 4, 6–8, 10–16); additional keyboards (tracks 4, 7); drum programming (track 7); executive production
- Joel Dieleman – additional keyboards (tracks 3, 5); synthesiser (tracks 4, 9, 12)
- Leon Den Engelsen – additional keyboards (track 1)
- Mucky – production (all tracks); mastering, mixing (tracks 1–6, 9–16); drum programming (tracks 1, 3–14); arrangement (tracks 1, 2, 4, 6–8, 10, 12–15); recording (tracks 1, 3–5, 9–14, 16); synthesiser (track 4); executive production
- Tokio Myers – additional keyboards (track 8)
- Mihai Puscoiu – strings (tracks 2, 6, 8, 14, 15); recording (tracks 6, 15); additional strings (track 12)

== Charts ==
| Chart (2017) | Peak position |
|---|---|
| Dutch Albums (Album Top 100) | 192 |

== Release history ==
| Region | Date | Format | Edition | Label | Ref. |
|---|---|---|---|---|---|
| Various | 26 April 2017 | Digital download | Standard | Twisted Elegance | |
| Europe | 28 July 2017 | CD | Standard | Butler | |
| Europe | 28 July 2017 | LP | Standard | Music on Vinyl | |
| Various | 21 November 2017 | Digital download | Reissue | Twisted Elegance | |
