= Natural Products Association =

- Type: Nonprofit
- Purpose: Natural products
- Location: Washington, D.C., United States
- Region served: United States
- Key people: Dr. Daniel Fabricant, (CEO and President); Mark LeDoux, (Chairman, NPA Board of Directors)
- Website: www.npainfo.org

The Natural Products Association or NPA (formerly the NNFA, or the National Nutritional Foods Association) is the largest and oldest nonprofit organization representing the interests of manufacturers and retailers of the natural products industry, which includes organic and health foods, dietary supplements, natural ingredient cosmetics, and other similar products. The organization includes more than 1,900 members accounting for more than 10,000 retailers, manufacturers, wholesalers and distributors of natural products.

== History ==
The Natural Products Association was founded in 1936 as the American Health Foods Association (AHFA) to inform consumers about the benefits of the natural nutrition industry. In 1937, the association changed its name to the Natural Health Foods Association (NHFA), representing retailers, manufacturers and distributors. In 1943, NHFA was renamed to the National Dietary Foods Association (NDFA). In 1970, NDFA officially became the National Nutritional Foods Association (NNFA). The organization renamed itself the Natural Products Association or NPA in June 2006. It has over 650 members today. Its members include suppliers, manufacturers, and retailers representing 10,000 storefronts.

== Programs ==
The science and regulatory affairs department oversees the association's third-party certification programs.

=== Natural Seal ===
The NPA Natural Seal is described as the first and only natural products certification in the United States. Currently only home care and personal care products and ingredients can be certified. The association requires that certified products must be at least 95 percent natural ingredients or ingredients from natural sources, excluding water. NPA-certified products must use natural ingredients, avoid ingredients with health risks, don't use animal testing, and include biodegradable or recycled material in the packaging. Products also must list all ingredients on the package label, and NPA requires 100 percent natural fragrances and colorants. Certified products are said to appear in more than 85,000 stores nationwide. NPA has certified more than 1,200 products and ingredients since 2008, including well-known brands like Burt's Bees and J.R. Watkins.

=== GMP Certification ===
The Natural Products Association launched the first third-party Good Manufacturing Practices (GMP) program for the manufacturing of dietary supplements and ingredients in 1999. NPA GMP Certification is awarded to companies that comply with the NPA GMP standard as verified through comprehensive third-party inspections of facilities and GMP-related documentation. More than 70 companies are known to have achieved certification. NPA also offers a series of GMP training seminars across the United States each year.

== Advocacy ==
The Natural Products Association educates members of Congress about the industry and the impact of federal legislation and regulations. In addition, NPA provides comments to federal agencies on how regulatory enforcement activities may affect manufacturers, retailers and consumers of natural products and dietary supplements. NPA's regional offices are primarily responsible for monitoring state legislative activity, though the national office leads outreach in California and Hawaii.

=== Natural Products Day ===
Each year, NPA hosts Natural Products Day for NPA members and others in the industry to visit Congressional offices and talk to senators, representatives and their staffs about legislative and regulatory issues. NPA also presents Congressional Champion Awards to selected legislators. In addition, the association hosts a California Natural Products Day in Sacramento.

=== The Big Natural ===
The Big Natural offers two days of industry-driven, educational sessions, workshop programming, case studies, interactive discussions, networking and benchmarking, and brings together industry leaders, innovators and government officials who share insights with the goal to educate, empower and spark innovative ideas to drive the industry forward.

=== Dietary Supplement Caucus ===
The Dietary Supplement Caucus (DSC) was launched in 2006 to serve as a bipartisan, bicameral group to facilitate discussions among congressional lawmakers about issues related to dietary supplements. In 2008, the DSC, in cooperation with the Natural Products Association and the Council for Responsible Nutrition, held its first briefing. The briefings continue to be held on Capitol Hill.

=== Industry Education ===
The Natural Products Association offers a variety of educational programs and resources for both members and non-members. These include:

- GMP training seminars for dietary supplement manufacturers about federal GMP requirements, compliance with GMP rules, and how to prepare for regulatory inspections.
- Labeling seminars covering both mandatory and non-mandatory elements of dietary supplement labeling, including labeling basics and regulations around health claims.
- The NPA Retailer's Staff Education Toolkit helps store owners educate their sales staff about what may and may not be discussed with customers about dietary supplements.
- Webinars and conference education sessions on industry topics throughout the year.

NPA members typically receive discounts off the price of education sessions.

== Regional Offices ==
Members of the Natural Products Association also may join one of five regional offices. Each region is governed by its own board of directors and the president of each region also sits on the national NPA Board of Directors. Regional offices include: NPA East; NPA Midwest; NPA Northwest; SENPA Southeast Natural Products Association; and NPA Southwest.
