= Shabrang (album) =

Studio album by Sevdaliza
- Released: 28 August 2020
- Recorded: 2018–2020
- Genre: Art pop; trip hop; alternative R&B
- Length: 62:15
- Language: English; Persian
- Label: Twisted Elegance
- Producer: Sevdaliza; Mucky

Sevdaliza chronology
The Calling (2018)	Shabrang (2020)	Raving Dahlia (2022)

Singles from Shabrang
- 1. "Darkest Hour" Released: 7 March 2019; 2. "Oh My God" Released: 30 January 2020; 3. "Lamp Lady" Released: 18 March 2020; 4. "Joanna" Released: 27 May 2020; 5. "Habibi" Released: 19 August 2020; 6. "Rhode" Released: 29 October 2020

Shabrang (Persian for "night color") is the second studio album by Dutch-Iranian singer Sevdaliza. It was released on 28 August 2020, by Twisted Elegance. The singer wrote and produced the album, primarily alongside Mucky. The album encompasses art pop, trip hop and alternative R&B.

The album spawned the singles "Darkest Hour", "Oh My God", "Lamp Lady", "Joanna" and "Habibi", as well as "Human Nature", which was originally released as part of Sevdaliza's 2018 extended play The Calling, her previous release. The album cover was shot by Tré Koch.

Upon its release, Shabrang was met with critical acclaim. Critics praised its emotional background, and its "slow-moving beauty".

== Background ==
On 7 March 2019, Sevdaliza released "Darkest Hour", followed by another single "Martyr" on 11 April. The two were thought to be standalone singles, however "Darkest Hour" would appear on digital copies of Shabrang. She would continue to subtly tease new music and visuals throughout the year.

In February 2020, Sevdaliza revealed that she had been working on her then unannounced sophomore album for the past two years, alongside close and frequent collaborators Mucky, Leon Den Engelsen and Mihai Puscoiu.

== Style ==
Compared to her previous trip hop releases, Shabrang witnesses Sevdaliza moving through different musical styles, from art pop to trip hop, as well as alternative R&B.

== Release ==
On 7 March 2019, Sevdaliza released "Darkest Hour", which at its time of release, was believed to be a standalone single.

On 30 January 2020, Sevdaliza released the protest song "Oh My God".

On 10 March, Sevdaliza announced the release of single "Lamp Lady". It was released 18 March.

Professional ratings
Review scores
Source	Rating
AllMusic	4.5/5 stars
Beats Per Minute	71%
Pitchfork	7.8/10

On 23 May, Sevdaliza announced the release of single "Joanna". A day before its release, Sevdaliza took to her Instagram stories to express her love towards the song, saying, "I wrote the song in 2018 and it's grown to be one of my favorite compositions. "Joanna" was released 27 May, alongside an accompanying music video, directed by Marlou Fernanda & Sevdaliza.

Sevdaliza announced Shabrang on 30 July. In a statement about the album, Sevdaliza said:

It is a deep love letter to myself... Shabrang is a depiction of functioning in my soul, like watching life happening in front of you and not for you. Always trying to return to the light, I shift between hope, faith and fear/dystopia. I feel privileged yet misunderstood. The underdog.

The song "Rhode" was made available to listen early the same day as the album's announcement, exclusively on the streaming platform Apple Music or if the album was pre-ordered on iTunes.

On 19 August, Sevdaliza released the single "Habibi", and announced an upcoming accompanying music video for the single. The music video was released 26 August and is directed by the "creative directing duo", sevda+ana, which consists of Sevdaliza and Russian filmmaker Anastasia Konovalova. The duo also plan to direct visuals separate from Sevdaliza's work.

Audio and music publication MusicNGear listed Shabrang as one of the best albums from 2020, stating that "the songs have a poetic and parable-esque quality to them - creating a chilling and alluring soundscape."

== Track listing ==
All tracks are written by Sevdaliza; all tracks produced by Sevdaliza and Mucky.

Shabrang track listing
No.	Title	Length
1.	"Joanna"	4:20
2.	"Shabrang"	3:04
3.	"Lamp Lady"	3:31
4.	"All Rivers at Once"	4:45
5.	"Habibi"	4:38
6.	"Dormant"	4:38
7.	"Wallflower"	3:01
8.	"Gole Bi Goldoon"	4:38
9.	"Darkest Hour"	4:28
10.	"Oh My God"	3:14
11.	"Eden"	4:09
12.	"Human Nature"	5:00
13.	"No Way"	4:57
14.	"Rhode"	3:22
15.	"Comet"	4:30
Total length:		62:15

Notes

- "Darkest Hour" does not appear on physical editions of the album.
- "Gole Bi Goldoon" is a cover of "Gole Bee Goldoon", performed by Googoosh.
- "Human Nature" has been updated since its original release on the 2018 extended play The Calling. It is 53 seconds shorter in length and features new string sections.

== Personnel ==
Credits adapted from album's liner notes.

- Composed by: Sevdaliza, Mucky, Leon Den Engelsen, Mihai Puscoiu, Joel Dieleman, Raven Aartsen, Ludowic
- Mixed by: Sevdaliza and Mucky
- Mastered by: Mucky

== Charts ==
Chart (2020)	Peak position
Belgian Albums (Ultratop Flanders)	166
Dutch Albums (Album Top 100)	39
German Albums (Offizielle Top 100)	100

== Release history ==
Region	Date	Format	Label	Ref.
Various	28 August 2020	Digital download; streaming	Twisted Elegance	
Various	28 August 2020	CD	Twisted Elegance	
Various	28 August 2020	LP; limited LP	Twisted Elegance	
