= Coachella 2023 =

American music festival

- Dates: Weekend 1: April 14, 2023–April 16, 2023; Weekend 2: April 21, 2023–April 23, 2023
- Locations: Empire Polo Club, Indio, California, United States
- Previous event: Coachella 2022
- Next event: Coachella 2024
- Website: coachella.com

Coachella 2023 was a music and arts festival that took place at the Empire Polo Club in Indio, California. The 22nd edition of the festival, it was held from April 14–16 and 21–23, 2023. It was headlined by Puerto Rican rapper Bad Bunny, South Korean girl group Blackpink, American singer Frank Ocean, and American rock band Blink-182. (Note: Frank Ocean was set to headline Weekend 2, before being replaced by Blink-182.)

== Background ==
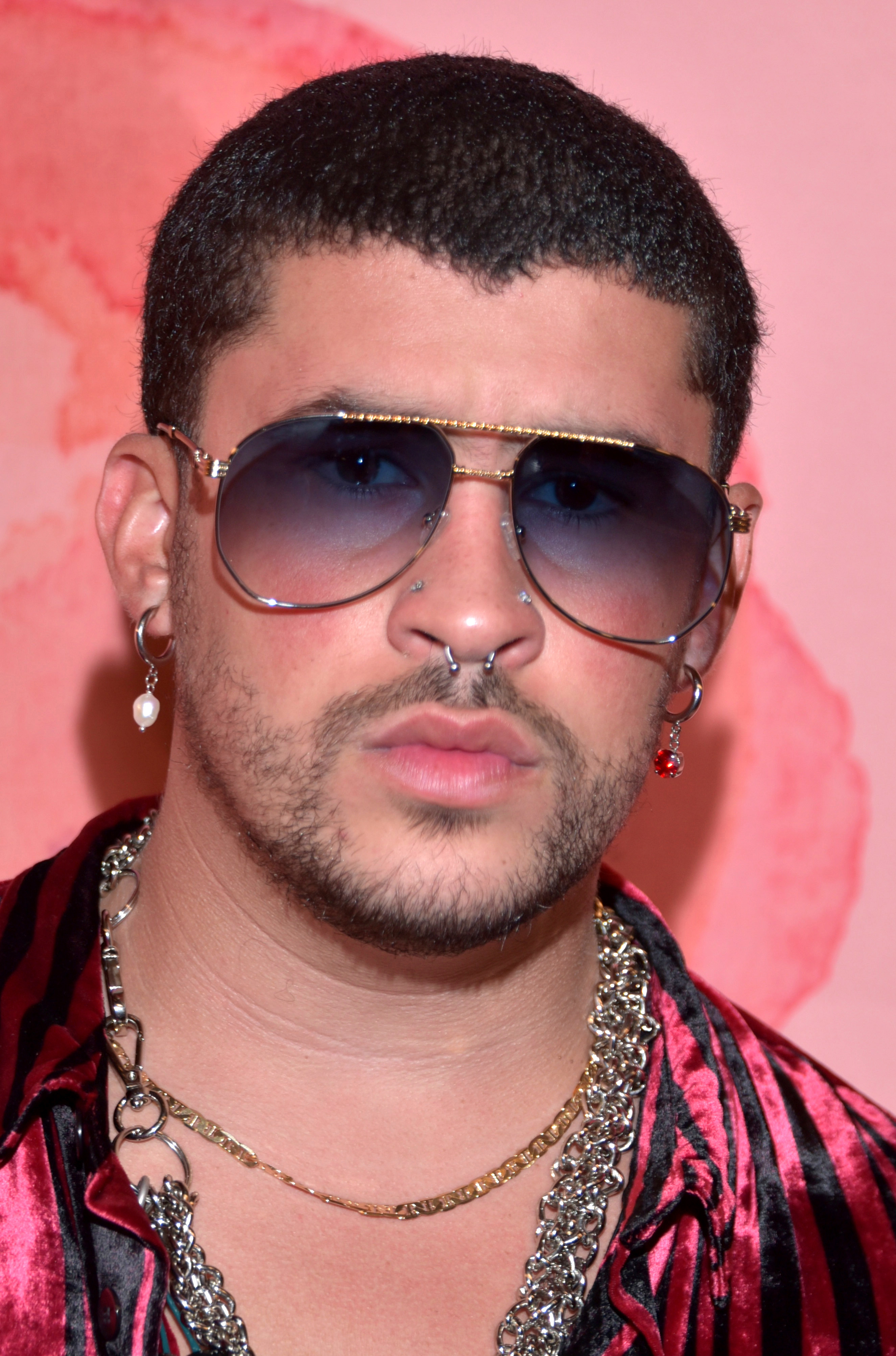
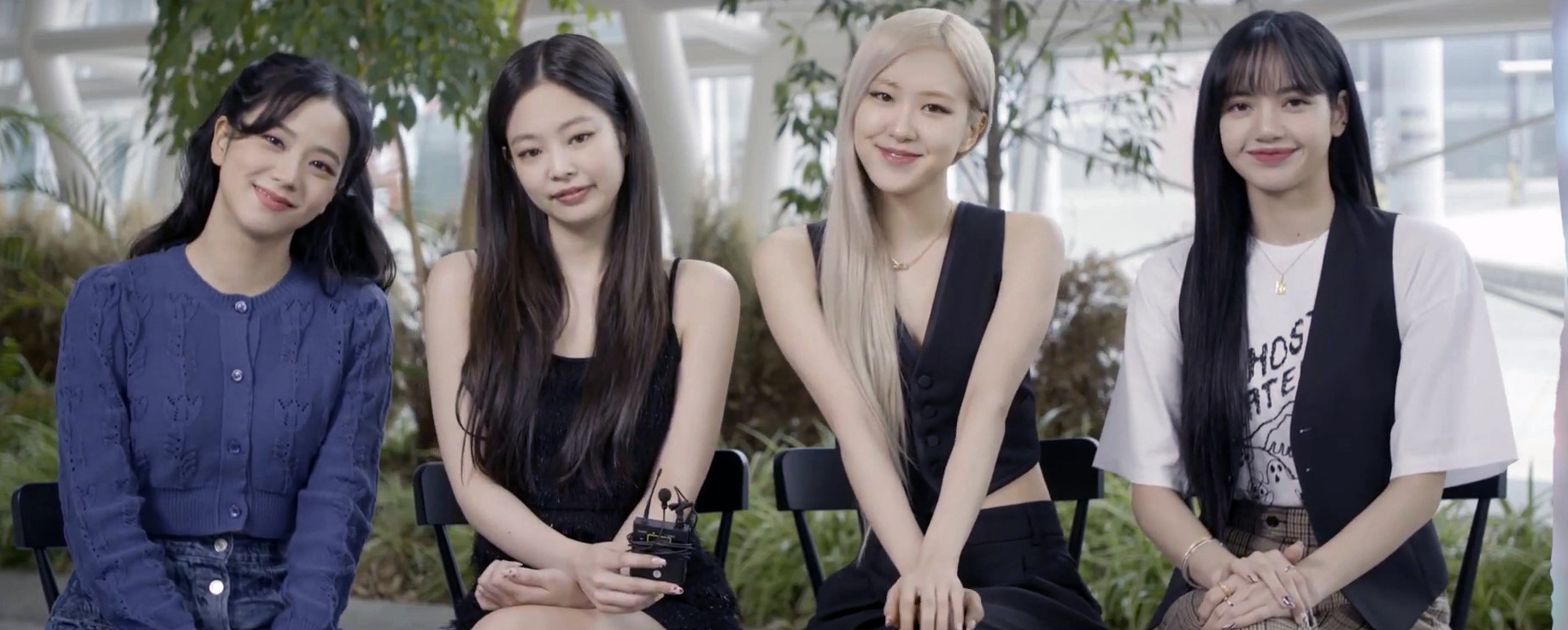
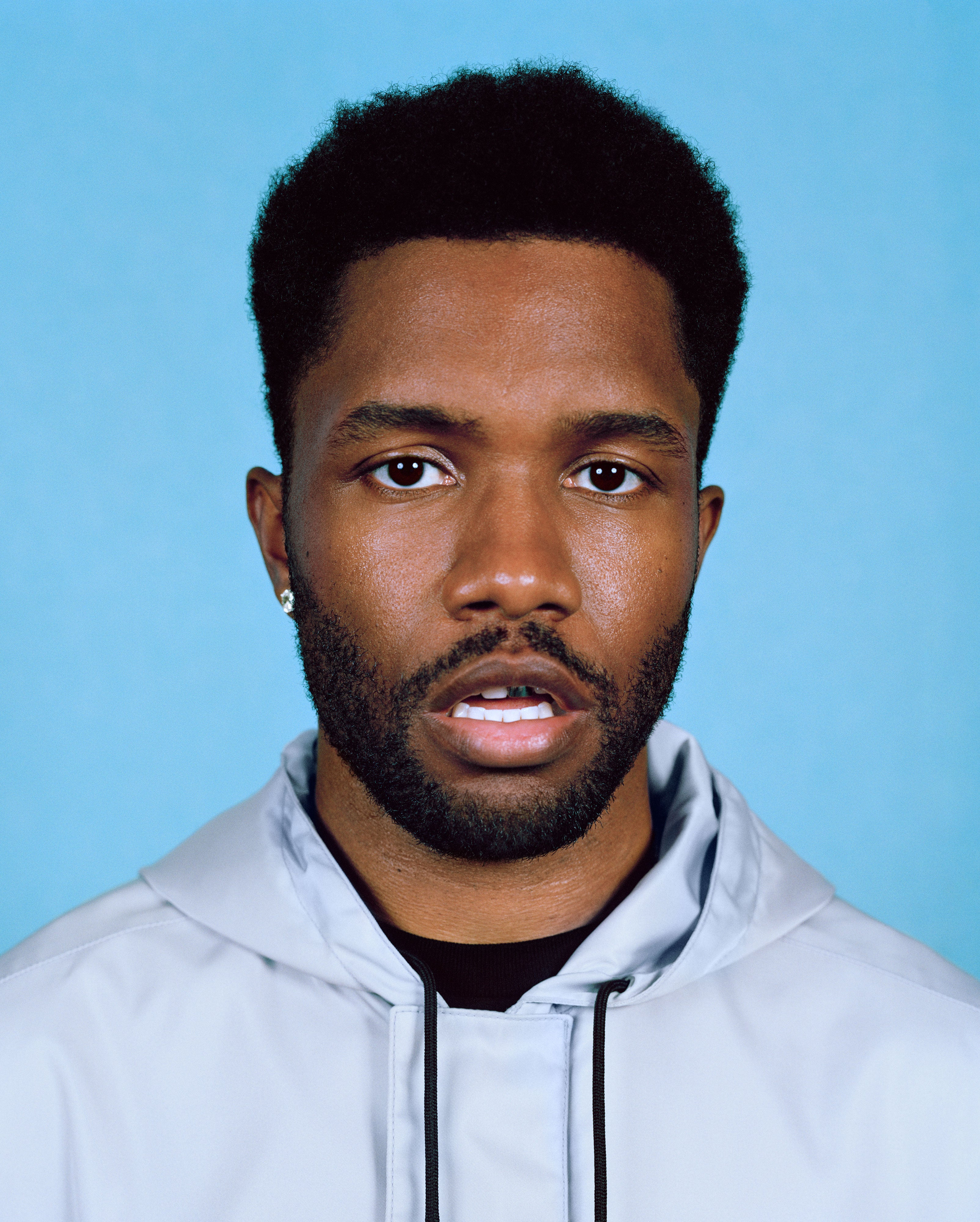
Coachella 2023 headliners Bad Bunny, Blackpink, and Frank Ocean (Weekend 1)

The dates for Coachella were announced on June 14, 2022, with pre-sale tickets going live on June 17.

=== Performance by Frank Ocean ===
On the final night of Weekend 1 of Coachella, there was uncertainty over whether headliner Frank Ocean would show up to the event. Despite his exclusion from the official YouTube livestream, Ocean began performing at 10:55 p.m., an hour later than his initial booking. He performed for an hour and a half, performing a rock version of his debut single "Novacane" (2011) that references Coachella, as well as reworked versions of several of his songs, such as "Bad Religion" off of Channel Orange (2012) and "White Ferrari" off of Blonde (2016). He then explained that his appearance was in honor of Ryan Breaux, his younger brother who died in a car crash in 2020. Ocean abruptly ended his performance with a cover of The Isley Brothers' "At Your Best (You Are Love)" (1976), once covered by Aaliyah, informing the audience that it was curfew. The performance was done through large video screens; the screens obscured Ocean and his band and were poorly lit. During the middle of the set, a DJ—later revealed to be DJ Crystallmess began playing, leading many fans to believe the show had concluded, before Ocean introduced her 15 minutes later, teasing Ocean's radio show Homer Radio.

Ocean's Coachella performance was harshly criticized from audience members, critics, and fans. The Festive Owl, speaking to several sources, later stated that a group of people surrounding Ocean were intended to be ice skaters and had practiced for weeks. As Coachella set up the stage, Ocean ultimately decided that he wasn't a fan of the ice skaters, leaving the festival with no option but to deconstruct the ice rink—which had been planned for months—threatening to not perform if it was not done. Melting the ice rink caused the one hour delay in his performance. Additionally, Ocean's performance needed to be adjusted as he sustained an ankle injury during rehearsals that week, according to Rolling Stone. TMZ added that the injury occurred while he was riding bicycles artists and staff use to navigate the festival, and was reportedly serious enough that Ocean's doctors advised Coachella to change his production. Ocean announced that he had pulled out of Coachella on April 19 due to his injury, leaving Blink-182 and later Skrillex, Four Tet, & Fred again.. to headline Weekend 2.

== Lineup ==
The lineup for Coachella was announced on January 10, 2023. For the first time since the festival began in 1999, all three headliners—Bad Bunny, Blackpink, and Frank Ocean—were not Caucasian, with Blackpink being the first Korean headliners. Following Ocean's departure, Blink-182, as well as Skrillex, Four Tet, and Fred again.., headlined Weekend 2. Coachella 2023 also featured acts fully sung in Arabic and Punjabi artist Diljit Dosanjh from India for the first time; these initiatives were part of a greater effort by Goldenvoice—the organizers of Coachella—to feature more diverse artists.

For the first time since 2019, Coachella 2023 hosted the Heineken House, a small venue sponsored by Dutch brewing company Heineken N.V., featuring American hip hop duo Method Man & Redman.

=== Coachella Stage ===
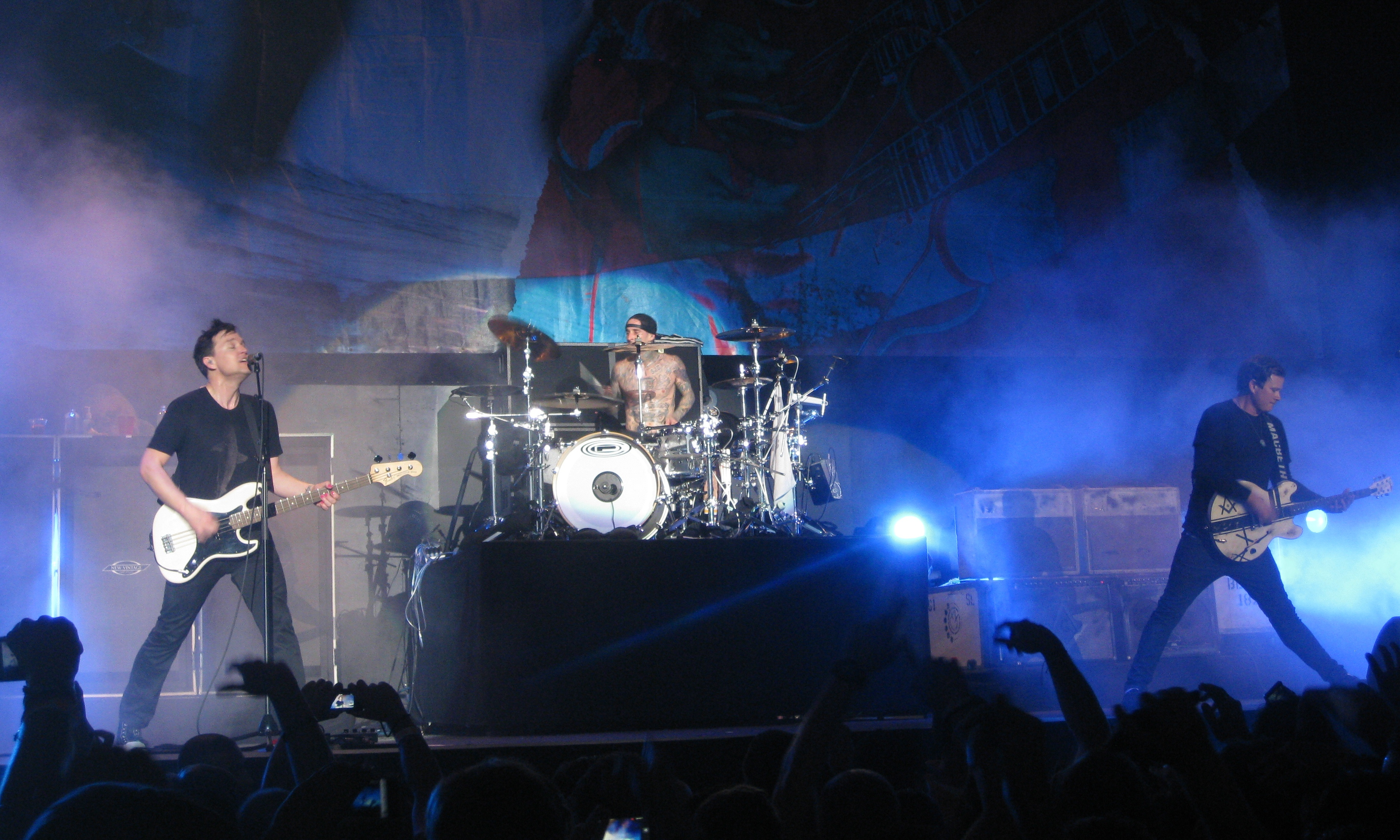
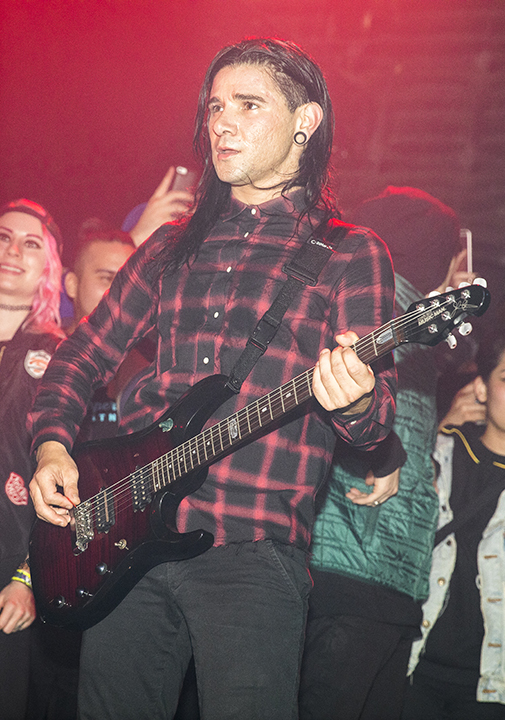
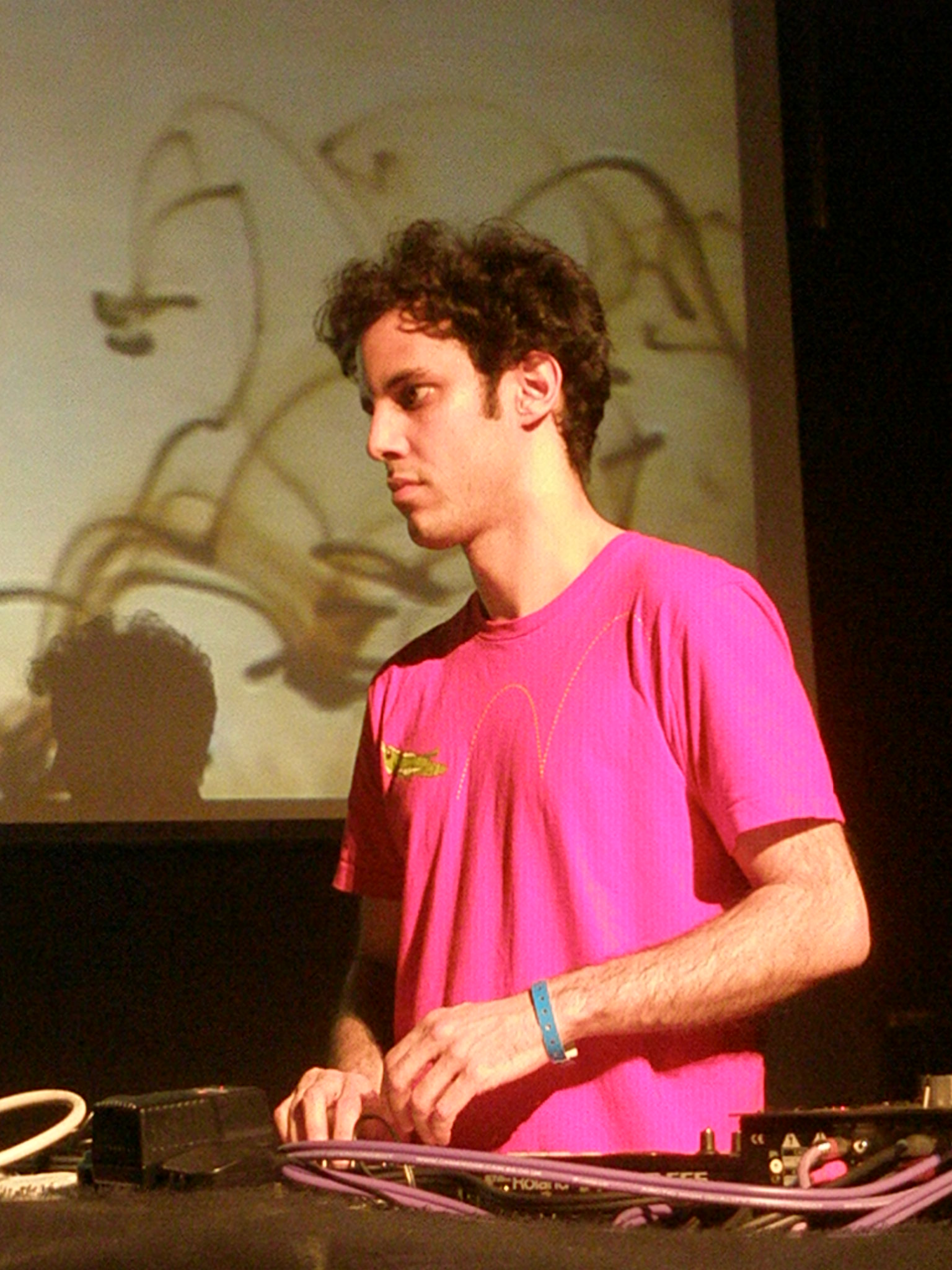
Following Ocean's exit from Weekend 2, Blink-182 (top), and Skrillex, Four Tet, and Fred again.. (bottom), were called to fill in for him.

Friday	Saturday	Sunday
Bad Bunny; Gorillaz; Burna Boy; Becky G; Pusha T; Doechii; Record Safari (Weekend 1)	Calvin Harris (Returning to the Desert); Blackpink; Rosalía; Charli XCX; 070 Shake; Marc Rebillet; BRN LUXXRY (Weekend 1)	Frank Ocean (Weekend 1); Blink-182 (Weekend 2); Skrillex × Four Tet × Fred again.. (Weekend 2); Björk; Kali Uchis; Porter Robinson; GloRilla; Los Fabulosos Cadillacs (Weekend 1)

Special guests

- Bad Bunny: During the first weekend set, he was joined by Jowell & Randy, Ñengo Flow, Post Malone and Jhay Cortez. During his second weekend set, he was joined by Arcángel, Grupo Frontera, Jowell & Randy, Ñengo Flow, José Feliciano and Jhay Cortez.
- Gorillaz: During the first weekend set, they were joined by Thundercat, Peven Everett, Jamie Principle, Bootie Brown, slowthai, Del the Funky Homosapien and De La Soul. During the second weekend set, they were joined by Beck, Thundercat, Bad Bunny, Moonchild Sanelly, Hypnotic Brass Ensemble, Yasiin Bey, Bootie Brown, Little Simz, Del the Funky Homosapien and De La Soul.
- Becky G: During the first weekend set, she was joined by Marca MP, José Ortiz Paz of Fuerza Regida and Peso Pluma. During the second weekend set, she was joined by Libianca and Natti Natasha.
- Calvin Harris: He was joined by Ellie Goulding during the first weekend set.
- Rosalía: During the first weekend set, she was joined by Rauw Alejandro. During the second weekend set, she was joined by Tokischa.
- Charli XCX: She was joined by Troye Sivan during the first weekend set.
- Kali Uchis: She was joined by Tyler, the Creator, Omar Apollo and Don Toliver during the first weekend set.
- Porter Robinson: He was joined by Madeon and Totally Enormous Extinct Dinosaurs during both weekend sets.
- GloRilla: She was joined by Lil Durk and Moneybagg Yo during the first weekend set.

=== Outdoor Theatre ===
Friday	Saturday	Sunday
The Chemical Brothers; Kaytranada; SG Lewis; Yungblud; Saba; The Comet Is Coming; Juicewon (Weekend 1); Mimi (Weekend 2)	Eric Prydz Presents HOLO; boygenius; SOFI TUKKER; Hiatus Kaiyote; EARTHGANG; Rebelution; Yimbo (Weekend 1); Tiffany Tyson (Weekend 2)	Fisher + Chris Lake; Dominic Fike; Rae Sremmurd; Big Wild; Stick Figure; Los Fabulosos Cadillacs; Jaqck Glam (Weekend 1); Gabe Real (Weekend 2)

Special guests

- Kaytranada: During the first weekend set, he was joined by Kali Uchis and Aminé. During the second weekend set, he was joined by H.E.R., Tinashe and Anderson .Paak.
- SG Lewis: During the first weekend set, he was joined by Channel Tres. During the second weekend set, he was joined by Tove Lo.

=== Sonora Tent ===
Friday	Saturday	Sunday
Uncle Waffles; Sasha Alex Sloan; TV Girl; Magdalena Bay; DannyLux; Soul Glo; Lava La Rue; The Murder Capital; Jim Smith (Weekend 1); Dave from the Grave (Weekend 2)	NIA ARCHIVES; Bakar; Sunset Rollercoaster; The Breeders; The Linda Lindas; Ethel Cain; Destroy Boys; BRATTY; Scowl; Horsegirl; Buster Jarvis (Weekend 1); Triste Juventud × TÓTEM (Weekend 2)	Sudan Archives; Knocked Loose; Mareux; Alex G; Momma; Sleaford Mods; El Michels Affair; Los Bitchos; Conexión Divina; Argenis (Weekend 1); Eric Sanchez (Weekend 2)

Special guests

- The Breeders: They were joined by The Linda Lindas during the first weekend set.
- BRATTY: They were joined by Cuco during the first weekend set.

=== Gobi Tent ===
Friday	Saturday	Sunday
Ashnikko; Whyte Fang; The Garden; Yves Tumor; Tobe Nwigwe; Overmono; Gabriels; ¿Téo?; Jupiter & Okwess; Desert Cahuilla Bird Singers	Donavan's Yard; Chromeo; Monolink; Eladio Carrión; Yaeji; Shenseea; Dinner Party; UMI; Elyanna; dxsko (Weekend 1); Kershawn tha Don (Weekend 2)	DPR Live + DPR Ian; DRAMA; Cannons; 2manydjs; Romy; Fousheé; Joy Crookes; Ali Sethi; Gingee (Weekend 1); BRIGGS (Weekend 2)

Special guests

- Tobe Nwigwe: He was joined by Coast Contra, Chamillionaire and Olu of EarthGang during the first weekend set.
- Chromeo: They were joined by La Roux during both weekend sets.
- Fousheé: She was joined by Steve Lacy during the second weekend set.

=== Mojave Tent ===
Friday	Saturday	Sunday
FKJ; Angèle; Blondie; Wet Leg; MUNA; BENEE; DOMi & JD BECK; Lewis OfMan; Black Jade (Weekend 1); Record Safari (Weekend 2)	Labrinth; Underworld; Jai Paul; Remi Wolf; Mura Masa; Yung Lean; Snail Mail; AG Club; wave Groove (Weekend 1); Juicewon (Weekend 2)	The Blaze; WILLOW; Christine and the Queens; Weyes Blood; Noname; IDK; Paris Texas; DJ Lil Buddha (Weekend 1); Muezette (Weekend 2)

Special guests

- FKJ: He was joined by June Marieezy and Bas during the first weekend set.
- Blondie: They were joined by Nile Rodgers during the first weekend set.
- Wet Leg: They were joined by Dave Grohl during the second weekend set.
- MUNA: They were joined by Boygenius during both weekend sets.
- BENEE: She was joined by Gus Dapperton during the first weekend set.
- DOMi & JD BECK: During the first weekend set, they were joined by Thundercat and Mac DeMarco. During the second weekend set, they were joined by Thundercat and Anderson .Paak.
- Labrinth: During the first weekend, he was joined by Billie Eilish. During the second weekend, he was joined by Sia and Zendaya.
- Underworld: They were joined by Yung Lean during the second weekend set.
- Mura Masa: During the first weekend set, he was joined by Cosha, Channel Tres, Shygirl, Bayli, Isabella Lovestory and Gretel Hänlyn. During the second weekend set, he was joined by Cosha, Gretel Hänlyn and NAO.
- WILLOW: She was joined by Jaden Smith during both weekend sets.
- IDK: He was joined by Rich the Kid during the first weekend set.

=== Sahara Tent ===
Friday	Saturday	Sunday
Metro Boomin; Two Friends; Jamie Jones; Blink-182 (Weekend 1); MK (Weekend 2); Vintage Culture; Malaa; Dombresky; Mary Jane (Weekend 1); Yimbo (Weekend 2)	$uicideboy$; The Kid LAROI; Tale of Us; Diljit Dosanjh; Elderbrook; Kenny Beats; Flo Milli; Venessa Michaels (Weekend 1); Saish K (Weekend 2)	Boris Brejcha; A Boogie wit da Hoodie; Jai Wolf; Jackson Wang; LØREN (Weekend 1); Latto; MK (Weekend 1); GORDO (Weekend 2); Pi'erre Bourne; Loboman (Weekend 1); sir skrause (Weekend 2)

Special guests

- Metro Boomin: During the first weekend set, he was joined by John Legend, Future, Don Toliver, 21 Savage, The Weeknd and Diddy. During the second weekend set, he was joined by The Weeknd, Future, Don Toliver and Offset.
- Two Friends: They were joined by Bebe Rexha during the first weekend set.
- The Kid LAROI: During the first weekend set, he was joined by Fivio Foreign. During the second weekend set, he was joined by Don Toliver.
- A Boogie wit da Hoodie: He was joined by Tyga and YG during the first weekend set.
- Jackson Wang: He was joined by Ciara during the first weekend set.
- Latto: During the first weekend set, she was joined by TiaCorine, Lola Brooke and Saweetie. During the second weekend set, she was joined by Mello Buckzz.

=== Yuma Tent ===
Friday	Saturday	Sunday
Maceo Plex; TESTPILOT; Mochakk; Idris Elba; Nora En Pure; Dennis Cruz + PAWSA; Oliver Koletzki; Kyle Watson; Chris Stussy; Juliet Mendoza	Keinemusik; Hot Since 82; WhoMadeWho; Jan Blomqvist; DJ Tennis + Carlita; Mathame; Colyn; Chloé Caillet; Francis Mercier; Talon	GORDO (Weekend 1); Adam Beyer; CamelPhat; Sasha & John Digweed; Cassian; TSHA; LP Giobbi; Airrica; Minus the Light

== Reception ==
Goldenvoice was hit with a US$133,000 fine for breaking the event's curfew; the performances by Frank Ocean, Bad Bunny, and Scottish DJ Calvin Harris contributed to the fine.
