= List of number-one hits of 2024 (France) =

This is a list of the French SNEP Top 200 Singles and Top 200 Albums number-ones of 2024.

== Number ones by week ==
=== Singles chart ===
Week	Issue date	Download + Streaming		
Week	Issue date	Artist(s)	Title	Ref.
1	5 January	Jungeli featuring Abou Debeing, Alonzo, Lossa and Imen Es	"Petit Génie"	
2	12 January	Jungeli featuring Abou Debeing, Alonzo, Lossa and Imen Es	"Petit Génie"	
3	19 January	Jungeli featuring Abou Debeing, Alonzo, Lossa and Imen Es	"Petit Génie"	
4	26 January	Jungeli featuring Abou Debeing, Alonzo, Lossa and Imen Es	"Petit Génie"	
5	2 February	Jungeli featuring Abou Debeing, Alonzo, Lossa and Imen Es	"Petit Génie"	
6	9 February	Jungeli featuring Abou Debeing, Alonzo, Lossa and Imen Es	"Petit Génie"	
7	16 February	Pierre Garnier	"Ceux qu'on était"	
8	23 February	Werenoi	"Pyramide"	
9	1 March	Pierre Garnier	"Ceux qu'on était"	
10	8 March	Pierre Garnier	"Ceux qu'on était"	
11	15 March	Pierre Garnier	"Ceux qu'on était"	
12	22 March	Benson Boone	"Beautiful Things"	
13	29 March	Benson Boone	"Beautiful Things"	
14	5 April	Benson Boone	"Beautiful Things"	
15	12 April	Benson Boone	"Beautiful Things"	
16	19 April	Benson Boone	"Beautiful Things"	
17	26 April	FloyyMenor and Cris MJ	"Gata Only"	
18	3 May	KeBlack and Franglish	"Boucan"	
19	10 May	Carbonne	"Imagine"	
20	17 May	Carbonne	"Imagine"	
21	24 May	Carbonne	"Imagine"	
22	31 May	Carbonne	"Imagine"	
23	7 June	Carbonne	"Imagine"	
24	14 June	Carbonne	"Imagine"	
25	21 June	Carbonne	"Imagine"	
26	28 June	Gims and Dystinct	"Spider"	
27	5 July	Gims and Dystinct	"Spider"	
28	12 July	Gims and Dystinct	"Spider"	
29	19 July	Gims and Dystinct	"Spider"	
30	26 July	Gims and Dystinct	"Spider"	
31	2 August	Gims and Dystinct	"Spider"	
32	9 August	Gims and Dystinct	"Spider"	
33	16 August	Gims	"Sois pas timide"	
34	23 August	Gims	"Sois pas timide"	
35	30 August	Gims	"Sois pas timide"	
36	6 September	Gims	"Sois pas timide"	
37	13 September	Gims	"Sois pas timide"	
38	20 September	Gims	"Sois pas timide"	
39	27 September	Gims	"Sois pas timide"	
40	4 October	SDM	"Pour Elle"	
41	11 October	SDM	"Pour Elle"	
42	18 October	SDM	"Cartier Santos"	
43	25 October	SDM	"Cartier Santos"	
44	1 November	SDM	"Cartier Santos"	
45	8 November	SDM	"Cartier Santos"	
46	15 November	SDM	"Cartier Santos"	
47	22 November	Damso and Kalash	"Alpha"	
48	29 November	Stromae and Pomme	"Ma meilleure ennemie"	
49	6 December	Gazo	"Nanani Nanana"	
50	13 December	Gazo	"Nanani Nanana"	
51	20 December	Gazo	"Nanani Nanana"	
52	27 December	Gazo	"Nanani Nanana"	

=== Albums chart ===
Week	Issue date	Artist(s)	Album	Ref.
1	5 January	Jul	Le route est longue	
2	12 January	Jul	Le route est longue	
3	19 January	Jul	Le route est longue	
4	26 January	Jul	Décennie	
5	2 February	Koba LaD and Zola	Frères ennemis	
6	9 February	PLK	Chambre 140 (P3)	
7	16 February	Booba	Ad vitam æternam	
8	23 February	Dadju and Tayc	Héritage	
9	1 March	Werenoi	Pyramide	
10	8 March	Les Enfoirés	2024: On a 35 ans!	
11	15 March	Les Enfoirés	2024: On a 35 ans!	
12	22 March	Les Enfoirés	2024: On a 35 ans!	
13	29 March	Les Enfoirés	2024: On a 35 ans!	
14	5 April	Beyoncé	Cowboy Carter	
15	12 April	Green Montana	Saudade	
16	19 April	Beyoncé	Cowboy Carter	
17	26 April	Taylor Swift	The Tortured Poets Department	
18	3 May	Taylor Swift	The Tortured Poets Department	
19	10 May	Dua Lipa	Radical Optimism	
20	17 May	Slimane	Essentiels	
21	24 May	Billie Eilish	Hit Me Hard and Soft	
22	31 May	Theodort	Imad	
23	7 June	SCH	Jvlivs Prequel: Giulio	
24	14 June	Jul	Mise à Jour	
25	21 June	Lacrim	Veni Vidi Vici	
26	28 June	Soprano	Freedom	
27	5 July	Imagine Dragons	Loom	
28	12 July	Jul	Mise à Jour	
29	19 July	Enhypen	Romance: Untold	
30	26 July	Stray Kids	Ate	
31	2 August	Maes	La vie continue	
32	9 August	Stray Kids	Ate	
33	16 August	Maes	La vie continue	
34	23 August	Billie Eilish	Hit Me Hard and Soft	
35	30 August	Sabrina Carpenter	Short n' Sweet	
36	6 September	Sabrina Carpenter	Short n' Sweet	
37	13 September	Indochine	Babel Babel	
38	20 September	Indochine	Babel Babel	
39	27 September	Tiakola	BDLM Vol. 1	
40	4 October	Mylène Farmer	Nevermore	
41	11 October	SDM	À la vie à la mort	
42	18 October	SDM	À la vie à la mort	
43	25 October	Werenoi	Pyramide 2	
44	1 November	Ninho and Niska	GOAT	
45	8 November	The Cure	Songs of a Lost World	
46	15 November	Julien Doré	Imposteur	
47	22 November	Linkin Park	From Zero	
48	29 November	Pierre Garnier	Chaque seconde	
49	6 December	Gazo	Apocalypse	
50	13 December	Sch	Jvlivs III: Ad finem	
51	20 December	Jul	Inarrêtable	
52	27 December	Jul	Inarrêtable	

== See also ==
- 2024 in music
- List of number-one singles in France
- List of top 10 singles in 2024 (France)
