= Dabeull =

French funk musician and record producer

- With his live band at Musilac, July 2026

Background information
- Born: David Saïd; 9 August 1985 (age 41)
- Origin: Paris, France
- Genres: Funk; boogie; Electro-funk; Nu-disco
- Occupations: Musician; singer; record producer; DJ
- Instruments: Synthesizer; talk box; vocals
- Years active: c. 2006–present
- Labels: Dabeull Records; Roche Musique; 88 Touches

Dabeull (real name David Saïd, born 9 August 1985) is a French funk musician, singer, record producer and DJ from Paris. He makes boogie and electro-funk in the style of the early 1980s, recorded on vintage analog synthesizers and drum machines, and is known for his use of the talk box. His best-known song, "You & I" with singer Holybrune, was certified gold in France in 2022. His first proper studio album, Analog Love (2024), reached number 27 in France.

== Early life ==
Saïd grew up in Paris. He discovered American funk as a teenager in the late 1990s, through friends and trips to record stores. He has no formal music training; he learned by listening to LPs over and over and working out the bass, guitar and effects on them. In his words, his "school" was copying 1980s funk bands such as the Bar-Kays and Kleeer.

He started making music alone in his bedroom at his mother's home, making mixtapes for friends, mostly instrumentals for rappers. His mother told him music was a hobby and not a job, and so he worked on the side, selling sneakers, as a courier and delivering pizza.

== Career ==
=== Kill Da Hype and early work ===
Around 2006–2007, in the early days of Myspace, Saïd and a friend from high school put a few electro tracks online for fun. They were soon contacted by a German label, then an English one, and then by Record Makers (the label of Sébastien Tellier and Kavinsky), and began touring abroad. The group was the electroclash duo Kill Da Hype; Saïd already went by the name Dabeull at the time. A techno phase followed, as did a meeting with Vitalic. Funk and disco were out of fashion then, and for years he made other styles such as electro house to earn a living.

According to his label's biography, the name Dabeull comes from a natural double earlobe (double lobe in French, which sounds like "Dabeull") on his right ear.

=== Fonk Delight and Indastudio (2014–2018) ===
His first EP, Fonk Delight, came out in 2014. It was followed in 2016 by the singles "Slave" and "DX7", the latter with Holybrune; together they had over 500,000 plays on Spotify by 2017. In the same period he produced for other artists, e.g. In Da Club, and wrote almost a whole album for Holybrune. He also produced for Disiz and three tracks for Cerrone's album Red Lips (2016), one of them with Aloe Blacc.

A meeting with Cézaire, head of the Paris label Roche Musique (also home to FKJ, Kartell and Darius), led to Indastudio (2017), a compilation and a web series of the same name. In each video Dabeull improvises a new track on his talk box and machines. The cover shows him dressed all in white with a big moustache, laughing among his vintage gear, much like Dr. Strangelove. He also put out "Love You So Much" with Darius.

=== Intimate Fonk, Loving Life and Cosmic Fonk (2019–2022) ===
In 2019 he released the EP Intimate Fonk on his own label, Dabeull Records. Roisin O'Connor of The Independent heard the influence of Nile Rodgers, James Brown and Prince on it, and of Dâm-Funk and Justice. The California DJ collective and label Funk Freaks put out a vinyl-only Dabeull 7-inch in 2020.

In December 2021 he and the pianist Sofiane Pamart released a joint album, Loving Life, on Dabeull Records and Pamart's label 88 Touches. It has ten tracks. He liked its French 1970s–'80s feel, he said.

The Cosmic Fonk EP followed in June 2022, with Rude Jude, Ferdi, Holybrune and others, as did Glitter Fonk. That year "You & I" went gold; as of 2026 it had over 50 million streams. He also co-produced the album Romance by the jazz musician Ferdi. In 2023 he was featured on "Je m'en fous de tout", from the 27th album by the Marseille rapper Jul.

=== Analog Love (2024) ===
Analog Love, billed as his first proper album, came out on 12 April 2024. It has nine tracks. It is entirely analogue. It was recorded in two weeks at a château in France, on the Harrison mixing console used for Michael Jackson's Thriller. The console, which weighs over 1,000 pounds (450 kg), had belonged to the French band Phoenix, who paid 17,000 USD for it while making Bankrupt! (2013). It had fallen into disrepair, and Phoenix let the band have it if they could fix it; the repair took two months. Guests include Holybrune, Rude Jude, Ferdi, Reva DeVito and Jordan Lee.

Billboard heard echoes of The Jacksons' "Walk Right Now" in the track "Look in the Mirror" and of Thriller's "The Lady in My Life" in "Fabulous Kisses", and called "Let's Play" a reworking of West Coast G-funk as love music. Carlos Marcos of El País put it among the twelve pop and rock albums of the month in August 2024, describing it as 40 minutes of polished, sensual dance funk of the early 1980s kind. The album reached number 27 on the French albums chart.

The same year he was featured on "Paradisco", a track on Purple Disco Machine's album Paradise (20 September 2024).

=== 2026 ===
In April 2026 he released the single "Shadow of Your Smile" on Dabeull Records. The same year, the journalist Diane Marois's three-part documentary Funky Diary, in which she follows Dabeull through Chicano funk culture in Los Angeles, came out in France.

== Style and influences ==
Dabeull calls his aim making funk "as the elders did", using synthesizers and drum machines of the period; the only modern item in his setup is a computer used as a multitrack recorder. He told Billboard that his job is "to make funk a modern music again", and that he wants younger listeners to stop seeing early 1980s funk as old or cheesy. His sound also draws on zouk and African music, mixed with synth-pop and nu-disco. Time Out Mexico describes it as synth-funk, soul, R&B, afropop and Caribbean rhythms with a French touch.

Besides the Bar-Kays and Kleeer, the bands he copied when learning, he has named Michael Jackson and Stevie Wonder as the artists he would most like to have worked with, and said that if he produced French 1980s-style pop it would be in the vein of Michel Berger. He has explained that the talk box was widely used by funk bands in the late 1970s and early '80s, and by Stevie Wonder, though today it is mostly linked with Daft Punk. Concert promoters have put him in the line of Prince, Zapp and Rick James, and the Paris listings guide Offi placed him in the tradition of the French Touch.

He performs in a big moustache, sunglasses and loud 1970s- and '80s-style shirts. As of 2024 his top five songs on Spotify had over 135 million streams combined; Ivan "Debo" Marquez of Funk Freaks called him "one of the best, if not the best" modern funk artists, because of his analogue approach.

== Live performances ==
At Rock en Seine, August 2025

For years Dabeull played mostly DJ sets, built around funk and '80s hits such as "Last Night a D.J. Saved My Life", "Maniac" and "Just the Two of Us" along with his own songs. In February 2023 he started touring with a band, with dates at the Ancienne Belgique in Brussels, Le Transbordeur in Lyon and La Cigale in Paris, which sold out.

The Dabeull Live Band at Musilac, July 2026

The Dabeull Live Band has nine or ten musicians in period costume and plays everything live on analogue gear: vintage synthesizers, real drum machines, guitar and saxophone, with no playback. Its music director is Julian Getreau, credited on Dabeull's records as Rude Jude. Shows mix his own material with covers and quotes from funk and disco classics, e.g. Earth, Wind & Fire's "Boogie Wonderland", the Rah Band's "Messages from the Stars" and "Maniac".

In spring 2024 the band played a five-date European tour (Amsterdam, Berlin, Lausanne, Paris and London), including L'Olympia in Paris on 7 April 2024, and the Nice Jazz Festival on 20 August 2024. In June 2024 the band opened the OLM-Souissi stage at the Mawazine festival in Rabat, ahead of Metro Boomin. His first US tour, that September, took in Brooklyn Steel in New York, San Francisco and Los Angeles; the Los Angeles show sold out quickly. On 22 February 2025 he played the Salle des concerts of the Philharmonie de Paris with nine musicians.

He played the Coachella festival in April 2026, on the Outdoor Theatre stage on both Fridays; on the first Friday his was one of the opening sets of the festival. In May 2026 he DJed at Versailles Electro in the gardens of the Palace of Versailles, with Cerrone and Folamour, and in July played Musilac in Aix-les-Bains. His autumn 2026 tour began at the Auditorio BB in Mexico City on 16 October, and the Dabeull Live Band was chosen to give the closing concert of the 54th Festival Internacional Cervantino, at the Alhóndiga de Granaditas in Guanajuato on 18 October; France was the guest country that year. Tickets went on sale on 1 July. The show sold out soon after. Arena dates on the European leg were set at Forest National in Brussels, the Zénith Paris (29 October), the LDLC Arena near Lyon (31 October), Tempodrom in Berlin and the Troxy in London.

== Discography ==
=== Studio albums ===
Title	Details	Peak chart position FRA
Analog Love	Released: 12 April 2024; Label: Dabeull Records / Roche Musique; Formats: LP, CD, digital	27

=== Collaborative albums ===
- Loving Life (with Sofiane Pamart, 2021, Dabeull Records / 88 Touches)

=== Compilations ===
- Indastudio (2017, Roche Musique)

=== EPs ===
- Fonk Delight (2014)
- Intimate Fonk (2019, Dabeull Records)
- Cosmic Fonk (2022, Dabeull Records)
- Glitter Fonk (2022, Dabeull Records)

=== Selected singles ===
- "Slave" (2016)
- "DX7" (featuring Holybrune) (2016)
- "You & I" (featuring Holybrune) – certified gold in France
- "Love You So Much" (featuring Darius)
- "Shadow of Your Smile" (2026)

=== Production and songwriting for others ===
- Holybrune – most of an album
- Cerrone – three tracks on Red Lips (2016), one featuring Aloe Blacc
- Disiz
- Ferdi – Romance (co-producer)

=== Guest appearances ===
- Jul – "Je m'en fous de tout" (2023)
- Purple Disco Machine – "Paradisco", on Paradise (2024)
