= List of top 10 singles in 2024 (France) =

Top songs in France in 2024

This is a list of singles that have peaked in the top ten of the French Singles Chart in 2024. This record chart has been based on digital download only.

== Top 10 singles ==
Key

Symbol	Meaning
◁	Indicates single's top 10 entry was also its French Singles Chart top 100 debut

Artist(s)	Single	Peak	Peak date	Weeks at #1	Ref.
Dua Lipa	"Houdini" ◁ [Entry date : 19 Nov. 2023]	4	7 January	-	
Imagine Dragons	"Children of the Sky"	9	14 January	-	
Eddy de Pretto	"Love'n'tendresse"	7	14 January	-	
Ariana Grande	"Yes, And?" ◁	5	21 January	-	
Lara Fabian	"Ta peine" ◁	6	4 February	-	
Dadju and Tayc	"I Love You"	8	11 February	-	
Jeck	"Parapluie"	6	11 February	-	
Booba	"6G" ◁	4	11 February	-	
Beyoncé	"16 Carriages" ◁	8	18 February	-	
Zaho de Sagazan	"La symphonie des éclairs"	2	18 February	-	
Pierre Garnier	"Ceux qu'on était" ◁	1	18 February	3	
Vernis Rouge	"Bande organisée" ◁	7	10 March	-	
Beyoncé	"Texas Hold 'Em" ◁ [Entry date : 18 February]	2	17 March	-	
Disturbed	"The Sound of Silence (Cyril remix)"	1	17 March	26	
Benson Boone	"Beautiful Things"	2	24 March	-	
Bon Entendeur and Nicoletta	"Fio Maravilha"	5	7 April	-	
Cyril	"Stumblin' In"	2	7 April	-	
Joseph Kamel an Julien Doré	"Beau"	10	21 April	-	
Måneskin	"Valentine"	8	21 April	-	
Shaka Ponk	"I'm Picky (Acoustique)"	9	28 April	-	
Jérémy Frerot	"Adieu" ◁	7	28 April	-	
Nemo	"The Code" ◁	10	19 May	-	
Eden Golan	"Hurricane" ◁	5	19 May	-	
Slimane	"Mon amour" ◁ [Entry date : 19 Nov. 2023]	1	19 May	1	
Hannes and Waterbaby	"Stockolmsvy" ◁	9	26 May	-	
Zaho de Sagazan	"Modern Love" ◁	2	2 June	-	
Eminem	"Houdini" ◁	2	9 June	-	
Carbonne	"Imagine" ◁ [Entry date : 12 May]	6	16 June	-	
Indochine	"Le chant des cygnes" ◁	4	23 June	-	
Coldplay	"Feelslikeimfallinginlove" ◁	4	30 June	-	
Don Omar, Lucenzo and Tiësto	"Danza Kuduro (Tiësto Remix)"	8	7 July	-	
Sabrina Carpenter	"Espresso"	4	7 July	-	
Hozier	"Too Sweet"	10	14 July	-	
David Guetta and OneRepublic	"I Don't Wanna Wait"	3	14 July	-	
Dua Lipa	"Training Season"	8	21 July	-	
Gims and Dystinct	"Spider"	2	28 July	-	
FloyyMenor and Cris MJ	"Gata Only"	5	11 August	-	
Billie Eilish	"Birds of a Feather"	1	18 August	1	
Karol G	"Si Antes Te Hubiera Conocido"	2	25 August	-	
Chappell Roan	"Good Luck, Babe!"	8	8 September	-	
Lucky Love	"Masculinity" ◁	5	8 September	-	
Kendji Girac	"Si seulement..." ◁	3	8 September	-	
Linkin Park	"The Emptiness Machine" ◁	3	15 September	-	
Sevdaliza, Pabllo Vittar and Yseult	"Alibi"	4	22 September	-	
Victor Le Masne	"Parade" ◁	3	22 September	-	
Jean-Louis Aubert	"Merveille"	6	29 September	-	
Gims	"Sois pas timide" ◁ [Entry date : 28 July]	5	29 September	-	
Kavinsky, Angèle and Phoenix	"Nightcall" ◁	1	29 September	8	
Lara Fabian	"Je t'ai cherché" ◁	10	13 October	-	
Julien Doré	"Toutes les femmes de ta vie"	10	20 October	-	
Céline Dion	"Hymne à l'amour" ◁	1	20 October	1	
Lady Gaga and Bruno Mars	"Die with a Smile" ◁ [Entry date : 25 August]	2	27 October	-	
Lady Gaga	"Disease" ◁	5	3 November	-	
Santa	"Recommence-moi"	3	10 November	-	
Joé Dwèt Filé	"4 Kampé" ◁ [Entry date : 3 November]	2	17 November	-	
Damso and Kalash	"Alpha" ◁	10	24 November	-	
David Guetta, Alphaville and Ava Max	"Forever Young"	5	24 November	-	
Star Academy	"Et si tu sens" ◁	9	1 December	-	
Stromae and Pomme	"Ma meilleure ennemie" ◁	3	1 December	-	
Rosé and Bruno Mars	"Apt." ◁ [Entry date : 27 October]	1	1 December	17	
Daft Punk	"Veridis Quo"	6	22 December	-	
Coldplay, Little Simz, Burna Boy, Elyanna and Tini	"We Pray"	4	22 December	-	

== Entries by artist ==
The following table shows artists who achieved two or more top 10 entries in 2024. The figures include both main artists and featured artists and the peak position in brackets.

Entries	Artist	Singles
2	Beyoncé	"16 Carriages" (8), "Texas Hold 'Em (2)
2	Bruno Mars	"Die with a Smile" (2), "Apt." (1)
2	Coldplay	"Feelslikeimfallinginlove" (4), "We Pray" (4)
2	Cyril	"The Sound of Silence (Cyril remix)" (1), "Stumblin' In" (2)
2	David Guetta	"I Don't Wanna Wait" (3), "Forever Young" (5)
2	Dua Lipa	"Houdini" (4), "Training Season" (8)
2	Gims	"Spider" (2), "Sois pas timide" (5)
2	Julien Doré	"Beau" (10), "Toutes les femmes de ta vie" (10)
2	Lady Gaga	"Die with a Smile" (2), "Disease" (5)
2	Lara Fabian	"Ta peine" (6), "Je t'ai cherché" (10)
2	Zaho de Sagazan	"La symphonie des éclairs" (2), "Modern Love" (2)

== See also ==
- 2024 in music
- List of number-one hits of 2024 (France)
