= Chaque seconde =

2024 studio album by Pierre Garnier

Studio album by Pierre Garnier
- Released: 7 June 2024
- Genre: French pop
- Length: 40:46
- Label: Columbia (Sony Music France)
- Producer: Daysy; Geneviève Lamborn; Marc Le Goff; Marso; Adèle Couvert; Cobalt; Sofiane Pamart; Tristan Salvati; Mosimann; Nino Vella

Singles from Chaque seconde
- 1. "Ceux qu'on était" Released: 7 February 2024; 2. "Nous on sait" Released: 17 May 2024; 3. "Chaque seconde" Released: 20 September 2024; 4. "Adieu, nous deux" Released: 22 November 2024

Chaque seconde is the debut studio album by French singer and songwriter Pierre Garnier. It was released on 7 June 2024 through Columbia Records (Sony Music France).

== Background and promotion ==
Chaque seconde was recorded following Garnier's victory in the eleventh season of the reality TV show Star Academy. It also features a duet track with one of the guests from that same season, French composer and pianist Sofiane Pamart. After this album, he officially announced his solo tour, which was played to sold-out crowds.

The reissue of the album, including four previously unreleased tracks, was released on 22 November 2024.

== Commercial performance ==
Chaque seconde sold 19,594 copies in three days. In one week, it sold 32,118 copies. Garnier achieved the best start for a debut French pop album since the creation of the Top Fusion (including streaming) in 2016.

The album was certified gold in two weeks, platinum in four months, and double platinum in eight months.

== Critical reception ==
Chaque seconde received a score of 3.5/5 on the website chartinfrance.net, indicating that the album "made in record time – comes out with honors", despite the lack of striking melodies and more personal lyrics.

== Track listing ==
Chaque seconde track listing
No.	Title	Writer(s)	Producer	Length
1.	"Comment faire"	Daysy, Geneviève Lamborn, Marc Le Goff, Pierre Garnier	Marso, Marc Le Goff	2:56
2.	"Les mots"	Daysy, Marso, Pierre Garnier	Marso	2:52
3.	"Ceux qu'on était"	Daysy, Joseph Kamel, Pierre Garnier	Marso	2:54
4.	"Chaque seconde"	Daysy, Joseph Kamel, Pierre Garnier	Marso	2:46
5.	"L'horizon"	Adèle Couvert, Daysy, Léo Chatelier, Pierre Garnier	Marso	2:42
6.	"Nous on sait"	Cobalt, Daysy, Joseph Kamel, Marso, Pierre Garnier	Marso	3:01
7.	"Pas une larme"	Sofiane Pamart, Pierre Garnier	Sofiane Pamart	3:31
8.	"Sur pause"	Cobalt, Daysy, Marso, Pierre Garnier	Marso	2:49
9.	"Ce qui me va"	Daysy, Mosimann, Pierre Garnier	Marso, Mosimann	2:35
10.	"À mes côtés"	Daysy, Marc Le Goff, Pierre Garnier	Marso, Marc Le Goff	3:14
11.	"Comme toi"	Daysy, Tristan Salvati, Pierre Garnier	Tristan Salvati	2:36
12.	"Tout en mieux"	Joseph Kamel, Mosimann, Pierre Garnier	Marso, Mosimann	2:29
13.	"Ceux qu'on était" (acoustic version)	Daysy, Joseph Kamel, Pierre Garnier	Marso	3:21
14.	"Ceux qu'on était" (piano version)	Daysy, Joseph Kamel, Pierre Garnier	Nino Vella	3:00
Total length:				40:46

Reissue
No.	Title	Writer(s)	Producer	Length
1.	"Contrôle"	Cobalt, Daysy, Pierre Garnier	Marso, Renaud Rebillaud	2:48
2.	"Laisse"	Daysy, Igit, Léo Chatelier, Pierre Garnier	Marso	2:33
3.	"Adieu, nous deux"	Pierre Garnier, Cobalt, Daysy	Marso, Renaud Rebillaud	3:08
4.	"Maintenant"	Pierre Garnier, Daysy	Tristan Salvati	3:00
5.	"Chaque seconde" (featuring M. Pokora)	Daysy, Joseph Kamel, Pierre Garnier, M. Pokora	Marso	2:46

== Charts ==
=== Weekly charts ===
Weekly chart performance for Chaque seconde
Chart (2024)	Peak position
Belgian Albums (Ultratop Flanders)	86
Belgian Albums (Ultratop Wallonia)	1
French Albums (SNEP)	1
Swiss Albums (Schweizer Hitparade)	4

=== Year-end charts ===
Year-end chart performance for Chaque seconde
Chart (2025)	Position
Belgian Albums (Ultratop Wallonia)	14

== Certifications ==
Certifications for Chaque seconde
Region	Certification	Certified units/sales
France (SNEP)	2× Platinum	200,000^{‡}
^{‡} Sales+streaming figures based on certification alone.
