= Dreamers (EP) =

2024 EP by Charles Leclerc and Sofiane Pamart

EP by Charles Leclerc and Sofiane Pamart
- Released: 16 February 2024
- Genre: Classical
- Length: 11:45
- Label: Verdigris; 88 Touches

Sofiane Pamart chronology
Noche (2023)	Dreamers (2024)	Forever Friends (2024)

Dreamers is a collaborative extended play by Monégasque racing driver Charles Leclerc and French pianist Sofiane Pamart. Described as an integration of the worlds of racing and music, the four-track EP was released by Verdigris Records and 88 Touches on 16 February 2024.

Dreamers debuted at number one on the Billboard Top Classical Crossover Albums chart and number two on the Top Classical Albums chart. The EP also entered the album charts in Germany and Switzerland.

== Background and composition ==
Dreamers was written and composed by Charles Leclerc and Sofiane Pamart, with Remy Lebbos as the mastering engineer. Pamart described the EP as a collaborative project which "brings together the high-octane world of racing and the emotive realm of music, embodied in four distinct and captivating co-composed piano pieces." The EP is further described as a composition of "melancholy, soft and emotional sounds".

During his off-season at Formula One, Leclerc spent part of his time in the studio with Pamart to put together the EP. The day before the EP release, Leclerc said, "I went into a studio for two days with Sofiane and we worked on four songs that will be released tonight at midnight. I’m so proud of the result."

Dreamers was released on digital streaming sites on 16 February 2024, and in CD and vinyl format on 24 May 2024.

"Dreamers is born from shared vision of blending the intensity of motor racing with the expressiveness of piano music, creating a narrative that speaks to the dreams and aspirations of both artists. This musical project is an immersive experience that unites the visceral energy of Formula 1 with the profound depth of piano music. A celebration of ambition and passion, reminding dreamers everywhere that with focus, heart, and no limits, the dream always continues."

— Sofiane Pamart

== Track listing ==
Dreamers Side A track listing
No.	Title	Writer(s)	Length
1.	"Focus"	Charles Leclerc; Sofiane Pamart	2:48
2.	"Heartbeat"	Leclerc; Pamart	2:38

Dreamers Side B track listing
No.	Title	Writer(s)	Length
3.	"Limitless"	Leclerc; Pamart	2:53
4.	"The Dream Continues"	Leclerc; Pamart	3:08
Total length:			11:45

== Charts ==
Chart performance for Dreamers
Chart (2024)	Peak position
German Albums (Offizielle Top 100)	12
Swiss Albums (Schweizer Hitparade)	92
US Top Classical Albums (Billboard)	2
US Top Classical Crossover Albums (Billboard)	1

== Release history ==
Dreamers release history
Region	Date	Format	Label	Ref.
Various	16 February 2024	Digital download; streaming	Verdigris; 88 Touches	
Various	24 May 2024	CD; 12" LP	Verdigris; 88 Touches	
