= Youssef Swatt's =

Belgian-Algerian rapper (born 1998)

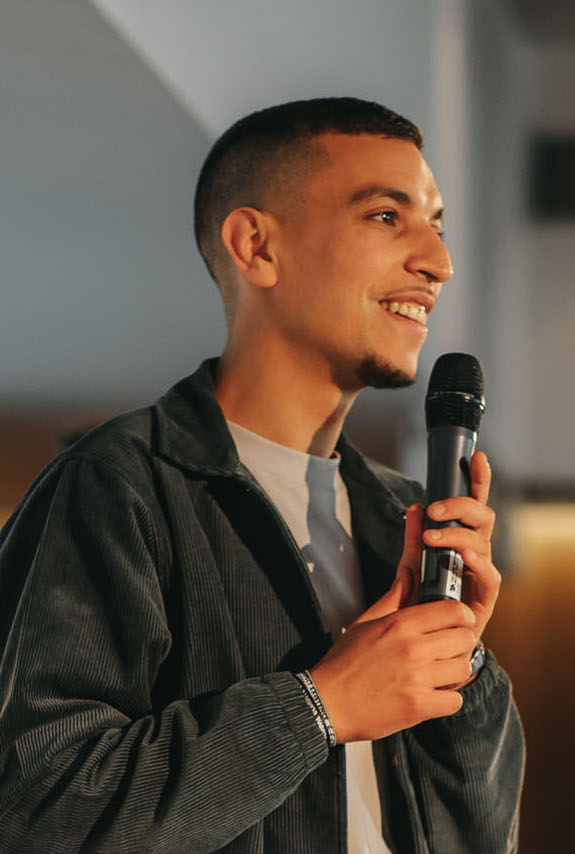
- Youssef Swatt's during his release party at the National Theatre of Brussels, June 2022

Background information
- Born: Youssef Reziki; February 8, 1998 (age 28); Tournai, Wallonia, Belgium
- Genre: Hip hop
- Occupations: Rapper, songwriter, artist manager
- Instrument: Vocals
- Labels: Rocher Noir, Elevate

Youssef Reziki (Arabic: يوسف ريزقي; born February 8, 1998), better known by his stage name Youssef Swatt's, is a Belgian rapper and songwriter of Algerian descent, known for his literary approach to hip-hop music.

Swatt's won season 3 of Netflix's rap competition series Nouvelle École (2024), which significantly expanded his audience in Belgium and France. He has released multiple albums and EPs, headlined venues including Ancienne Belgique and La Cigale. Beyond performing, Swatt's regularly leads writing workshops in schools, youth services, prisons and psychiatric institutions.

== Early life ==
Youssef Reziki was born in Tournai, Belgium to a family of Algerian descent. He developed an early interest in both literature and French hip-hop, influenced by his older sister and brother respectively.

He completed his secondary education at Collège Notre-Dame de Tournai, where a French teacher recognized his writing talent and encouraged him to pursue writing seriously. He began writing poetry and short stories at age twelve.

== Career ==
=== Music ===
Swatt's musical career began with self-produced EPs L'Amorce (2014) and Petit Youssef (2015). In 2017, he launched his debut album Vers l'infini et au-delà through a successful crowdfunding campaign. The album enabled him to perform across Belgium, France, Switzerland, and Senegal.

He followed with collaborative album Poussières d'espoir (2020) with El Gaouli and solo album Pour que les étoiles brillent (2022). His career gained significant momentum after winning the third season of Netflix's competition Nouvelle École in July 2024, where he impressed judges SCH, Aya Nakamura, and SDM.

In February 2025, he released the EP Chute Libre, featuring collaborations with Youssoupha, Sofiane Pamart, and fellow Nouvelle École contestant James Loup.

Swatt's 2026 Lettre à ma mère (Letter to my mother) includes vocal tracks by Tunisian singer-songwriter Emel Mathlouthi.

=== Artistry ===
Swatt's is frequently described as an “old-school” or “boom-bap” rapper whose work blends intimate storytelling with social reflection. He cites formative influence from Soprano (Psy 4 de la Rime), Keny Arkana, Diam's, Youssoupha, Kery James, Oxmo Puccino, IAM, and Tupac, alongside North African music. Critics and broadcasters note his emphasis on writing dense, structured verses and a “conscious” bent balanced with contemporary production touches.

=== Other ventures ===
Since 2021, Swatt's has worked as artistic agent for the group Coline & Toitoine (now known as Colt). He delivered a TEDx talk titled "Repartir à zéro" in Brussels in May 2023. In October 2024, he contributed to the soundtrack of the musical La Haine, collaborating with French singer Clara Luciani.

In October 2025, Swatt's took part in maritime initiatives aiming to deliver humanitarian aid to Gaza and challenge the Israeli naval blockade. In interviews given from aboard the “Thousand Madleens” flotilla, he described the effort as both moral and legal, stating that the objective was to “break the illegal blockade,” open a safe humanitarian corridor, and draw attention to what participants characterized as institutional inaction; he also argued that “neutrality is a myth” and that silence amounts to complicity.

On 8 October 2025, multiple media reported that several vessels, including the Gaza Sunbird, Alaa Al-Najjar, Anas Al-Sharif and others, were intercepted by the Israeli forces on the high seas, with passengers transferred to an Israeli port for deportation.

== Public image and reception ==
Media in Belgium and France have framed Swatt's as part of a resurgence of text-driven “classic” rap. RTBF and Focus Vif emphasized his steady rise from teenage prodigy to headliner; DH Radio named him a Belgian discovery in early 2022.

Following Nouvelle École, coverage in Le Parisien and Marie Claire Belgique highlighted his reputation for precise writing and values-forward messaging, as well as the rapid escalation of touring demand. In February 2025, Forbes Belgique profiled Swatt's as part of its “30 Under 30”.

== Discography ==
=== Studio albums ===
- 2017: Vers l'infini et au-delà
- 2020: Poussières d'espoir (with El Gaouli)
- 2022: Pour que les étoiles brillent

=== EPs ===
- 2014: L'Amorce
- 2015: Petit Youssef
- 2025: Chute Libre

== See also ==
- Belgian hip-hop
- Algerian hip-hop
- Algerian diaspora
