= Roche Musique =

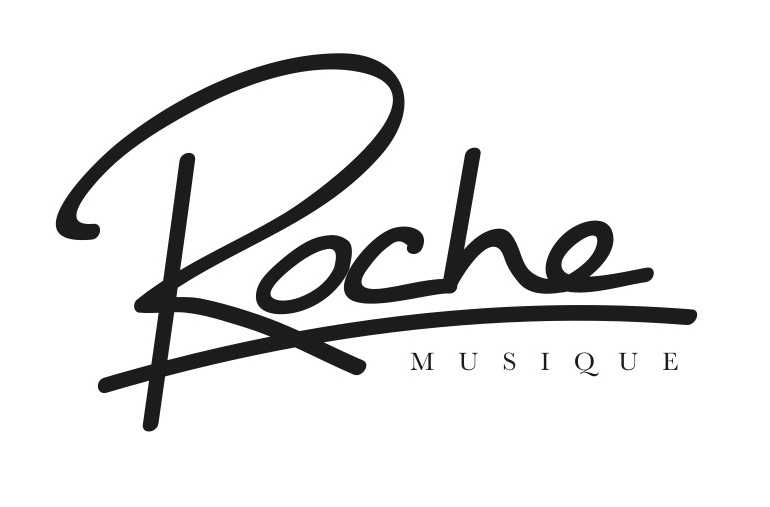
- Founded: 2012
- Founder: Cezaire
- Status: Independent label
- Genre: Nu-disco, neo soul, french house, funk, contemporary R&B, instrumental hip hop
- Country of origin: France
- Location: Paris
- Official website: Official website

Roche Musique is an independent electronic music label based in Paris and founded in 2012 by DJ and producer Jean Janin, also known as Cezaire.

== History ==
Roche Musique was founded in 2012 by DJ and producer Jean Janin, also known as Cezaire. Kartell, who knew Cezaire since 2007, became the first artist to be signed on the label with his debut EP Riviera released in 2012. The same year, the label released "Lying Together", a neo-house track composed by Tours multi-instrumentalist FKJ, managed by his Cezaire, and followed a year later by the second EP, ′′Time For A Change′′.

In 2014, Cezaire got acquainted with Dabeull in Paris, an artist influenced by funk, zouk and disco. It was also the year of the Romance release, EP from Darius, the electro-soul producer from Bordeaux. Meanwhile, French-californian producer Zimmer – signed since 2015 – released his EP ′′Coming Of Age′′, followed by ′′Ceremony′′ a year later. In 2016, producer and drawer Crayon joined the entity and brought out a 4-titles joint EP with Duñe, also an artist signed to Roche Musique.

In an interview with the Inrocks, Cezaire explained that the common genres of the Roche Musique's roster are funk, house, soul, jazz, and hip-hop—all defined by the presence of groove.

In 2017, FKJ released his eponymous first album French Kiwi Juice, internationally Gold Certified and also Platinum with "Better Give U Up" single. Darius' first album Utopia was released the same year.

In 2018, several new artists were signed on the label, including Katuchat, Rivage (Kartell's pop duo with Alex Gonzalez), Maydien, and Madijuwon, the latter of whom come out with a music video "Precious Things" as a part of Adidas Originals projectThe Creator Source.

The record company is included in the top ten best French labels, according to the media Jack, affiliated with the French television channel Canal+.

The label expanded with the 2018 launch of a ready-to-wear clothing line, the creation of the sub-label – Mineral Records – and the online radio Source Radio.

== Artists ==
- FKJ
- Darius
- Kartell
- Zimmer
- Dabeull
- Crayon
- Duñe
- Cezaire
- Katuchat
- Plage 84
- Maydien
- Madijuwon
- WAYNE SNOW
- Didi Han
- Cherokee

== Discography ==
Releases
Year	Artist	Projects	Type
2012	Kartell	Riviera	EP
2012	FKJ	The Twins	EP
2012	XTRAFUNK	Last Summer	EP
2013	Cherokee	Don't Matter	Single/remixes
2013	Kartell	Sapphire	Album
2013	FKJ	Time For A Change	EP
2013	Darius	Romance	EP
2013	FKJ	Take Off	EP
2014	Zimmer	Sensify Me	Single/remixes
2014	Dabeull	Fonk Delight	EP
2014	Jordan Lee	Therapy	EP
2014	Chloé Martini	Private Joy	EP
2014	Cherokee	Teenage Fantasy	EP
2015	Plage 84	Not Too Fast	EP
2015	Darius	Helios	Single/remixes
2015	Zimmer	Coming Of Age	EP
2015	Zimmer	Coming of Age (Club Edits)	Remixes
2016	Wantigga	Pillow Talk	EP
2016	Dabeull	DX7	Single
2016	Dabeull	Slave	Single
2016	Cezaire	Seize The Day	EP
2016	Duñe & Crayon	Duñe x Crayon	EP
2016	Crayon	Flee	EP
2016	Duñe	Leos	EP
2017	Oshan	Most At Home	EP
2017	Kartell	Last Glow	EP
2017	Zimmer	Ceremony	EP
2017	Crayon	Ocean 7, Pt.2	Single
2017	FKJ	French Kiwi Juice	LP
2017	Tommy Jacob	Projet 001	EP
2017	Télepopmusik	Breathe (Remixes)	Remixes
2017	Zimmer	Ceremony (Remixes)	EP/remixes
2017	Maydien	Tea and Love Seats	EP
2017	FKJ	Is Magic Gone	Single
2017	Darius	Utopia	Album
2018	Crayon	Post Blue	EP
2018	Wantigga	Suddenly Everything	EP
2018	Katuchat	Anaesthesia	EP
2018	Plage 84	WAS IT REAL?	EP
2018	Zimmer	Landing	Single
2018	Rivage	La Plage	Single
2018	Zimmer	Wildflowers	Single
2018	Plage 84	WAS IT REAL? (Remixes)	EP/Remixes
2019	Dabeull	Do it	Single
2019	Maydien	Maytrix	EP
2019	Katuchat	Rarities	EP
2019	Dabeull	Intimate Fonk	EP
2019	FKJ	Leave my Home	Single
2019	Zimmer	Mayans	Single
2019	FKJ	Perfect Timing	Single
2019	Maydien	Something Special	Single
2019	Zimmer	Rey	Single
2019	Rivage	Face à Face	Single
2019	Mitchell Yard, Ayelle	Mary Jane	Single
2019	Rivage	Long-courrier	Album
2019	Zimmer	Zimmer	Album
2019	FKJ	Ylang Ylang	Album
2019	Cezaire	Attraction	EP
2020	Madijuwon	Stripes	Single
2020	Farr	Weightless	Album
2020	Duñe & Crayon	Hundred Fifty Roses	Album
2020	Zimmer	Meteor	Single
2020	Katuchat	Together in Delight	Single
2020	Kartell feat. Che Lingo	All in	Single

== Compilations ==
- .Wave – 2016
- .Wave II – 2018

In 2019, the label collaborated with the French brand CHMPGN on a capsule collection named "The French Wave"9. At the occasion of the Asia Tour, it works with American brand Schott N.Y.C on their iconic jacket, the Bomber. For the international music celebration day, Roche Musique is associated with a Japanese brand – Uniqlo – on a capsule collection.
