= Nino Vella =

French composer, pianist, singer, and music producer (1992–2024)

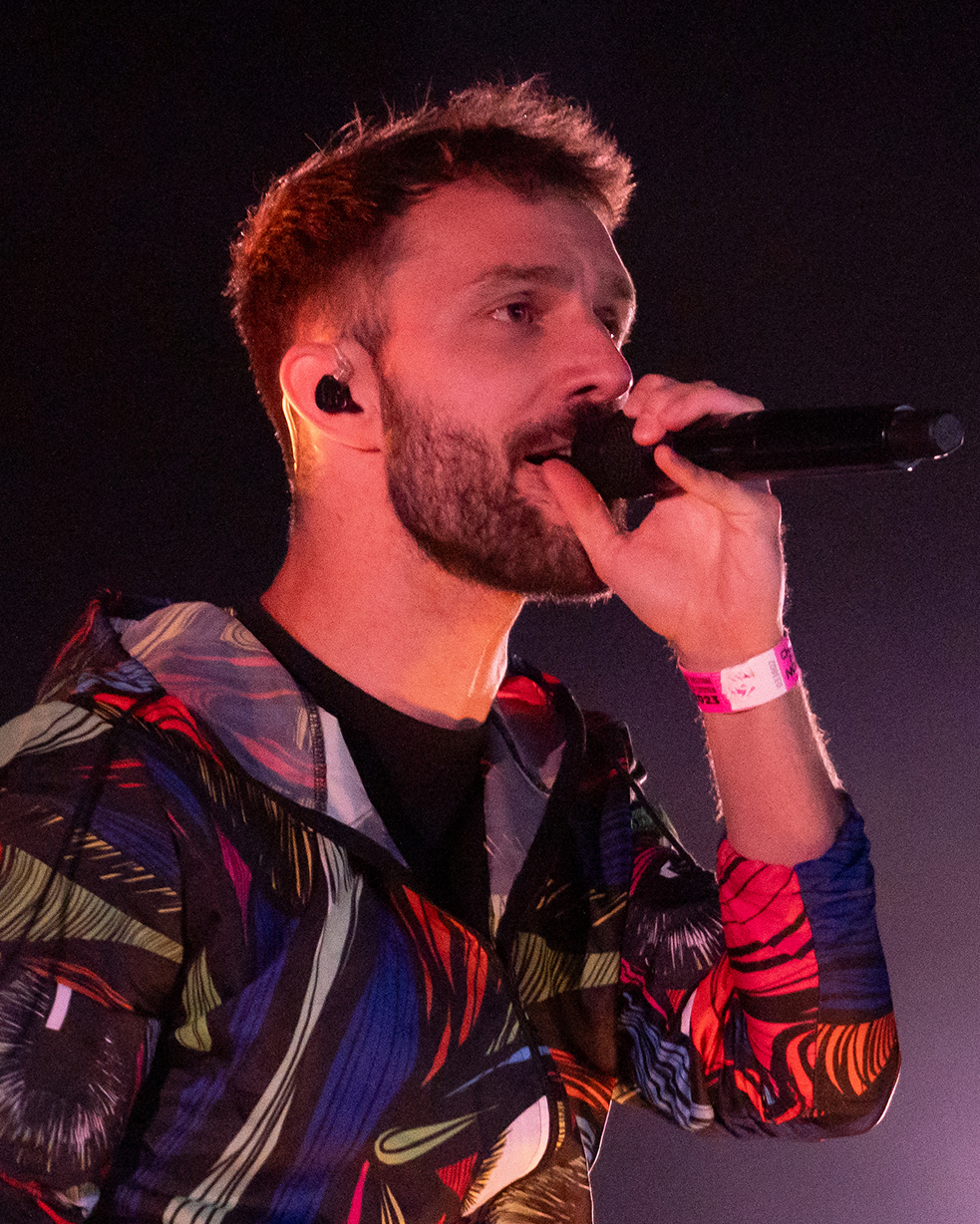
- Nino Vella, 2023
- Born: 18 November 1992; Cholet, France
- Died: 1 July 2024 (aged 31); Paris, France
- Occupation: Musician

Nino Vella (18 November 1992 – 1 July 2024) was a French composer, pianist, singer, and music producer.

== Biography ==
Born in Cholet on 18 November 1992, Vella took up an interest in music at a young age, beginning music school at age six. He first studied classical music and jazz before learning electronic music at the age of 11 in a small studio in his parents' home. He joined his first bands at age 14, where he was a pianist, singer, guitarist, and drummer. In 2012, when he was 19, he received the Prix de Piano et le Prix d’Orchestration au Conservatoire de Cholet.

After finishing his baccalauréat, Vella composed original music for multiple plays before created the band Babel. With the band, he performed in France, Canada, and China from 2010 to 2018. In 2016, he produced his first rap album for Boostee before signing a contract with Universal Music Publishing Group. Afterwards, he collaborated with the likes of Maes, Yseult, Yannick Noah, Olivia Ruiz, Mylène Farmer, and Eddy de Pretto. In 2020, he composed music for the Netflix original film How I Became a Super Hero. In 2021, he went on tour with the singer Yseult as a pianist and singer. He also accompanied the singers Vianney and Julien Clerc. After creating his own record label, he founded the band Rouquine alongside Sébastien Rousselet in 2020. A year later, the duo won the show The Artist, hosted by Nagui. The victory was followed by an album titled Masculine, which was toured through France, Switzerland, China, and Belgium, as well as at the Printemps de Bourges.

Vella died in Paris on 1 July 2024, at the age of 31.
