= Ceux qu'on était =

2024 single by Pierre Garnier

Single by Pierre Garnier

from the album Chaque seconde
- Released: 7 February 2024
- Genre: French pop
- Length: 2:54
- Label: Columbia (Sony Music France)
- Songwriters: Pierre Garnier; Daisy Berthenet; Joseph Kamel
- Producer: Marso

Pierre Garnier singles chronology
"Ceux qu'on était" (2024)	"Nous on sait" (2024)

"Ceux qu'on était" is the debut single by French singer and songwriter Pierre Garnier. It was written by Garnier, Daisy Berthenet, Joseph Kamel, with production handled by Marso. The single was released on 7 February 2024 as the first single from his debut album, Chaque seconde.

== Background and promotion ==
"Ceux qu'on était" was written by Pierre Garnier, Daisy Berthenet, Joseph Kamel, and produced by Marso. The song was written during a party with friends a few weeks before Garnier's entry into the Star Academy competition; the song is written to reflect the theme of breakups. The single was released on 7 February 2024, and reached number one in less than 24 hours. An acoustic version was released on 23 February 2024, followed by a piano-vocal version on 27 March 2024.

== Accolades ==
Ceux qu'on était won the Francophone Song of the Year at the 2024 NRJ Music Awards and the Victoires de la Musique Original Song of the Year in 2025.

== Commercial performance ==
On 27 February 2024, "Ceux qu'on était" was certified gold by the SNEP, two weeks after its official release. It became platinum on 25 March 2024, and diamond on 13 May 2024.

== Music video ==
The music video was filmed in Spain during the week of 14 February 2024, and released on 22 March 2024.

== Charts ==
=== Weekly charts ===
Weekly chart performance for "Ceux qu'on était"
Chart (2024)	Peak position
Belgium (Ultratop 50 Wallonia)	1
France (SNEP)	1
Switzerland (Schweizer Hitparade)	5

== Certifications ==
Region	Certification	Certified units/sales
Belgium (BRMA)	2× Platinum	80,000^{‡}
France (SNEP)	Diamond	333,333^{‡}
^{‡} Sales+streaming figures based on certification alone.
