= Sofiane Pamart =

French pianist (born 1990)

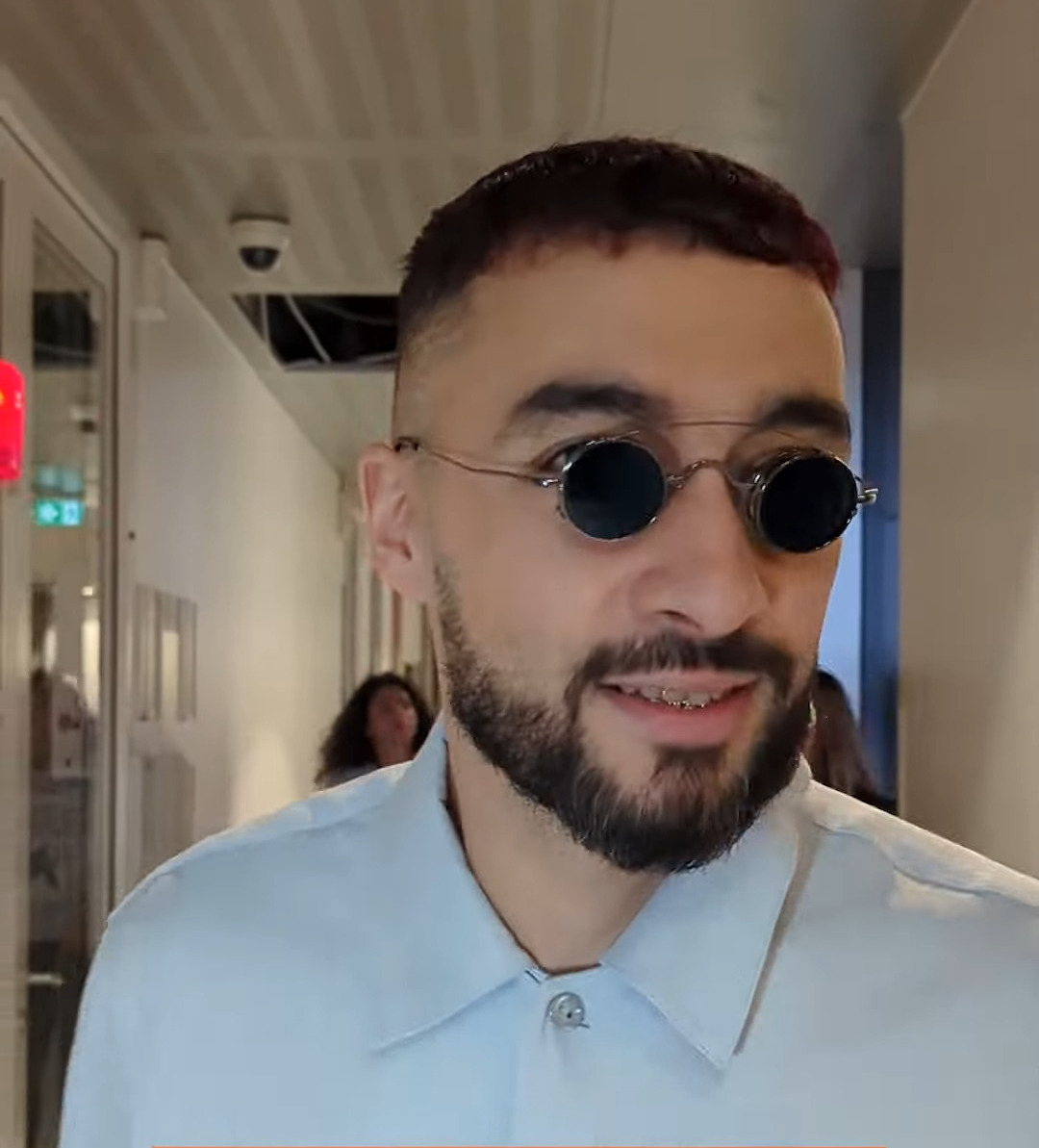
- Pamart in 2023

Background information
- Born: 25 April 1990 (age 36)
- Origin: Hellemmes-Lille, France
- Genres: Classical; hip-hop; easy listening
- Occupations: Pianist; composer; songwriter
- Instrument: Piano
- Years active: 2018–present
- Labels: 88 Touches; PIAS
- Website: sofianepamart.com

Sofiane Pamart (born 25 April 1990) is a French pianist. He is known for contributing to the French rap scene and collaborating with Formula One driver Charles Leclerc. He has collaborated with several French and Belgian rappers, including Koba LaD, Vald, Maes, Sneazzy, Médine, and Dinos.

He is a graduate and receiver of a gold medal from the Conservatoire de Lille. In 2019, he was credited as a songwriter for two singles certified Gold: "Matin" by Koba LaD ft. Maes and "Journal Perso II" by Vald. The albums that both singles appeared on also achieved Gold status.

== Early life and education ==
Sofiane Pamart was born on 25 April 1990 in Hellemmes where he grew up with his brother and sister, of whom he was the eldest. His father, from a family originally from Nord-Pas-de-Calais, then directed a French language center for foreigners, while his mother was a professor of literature. The mining tradition has been present in his family since his great-grandfathers who were underground miners. His maternal grandfather is of Moroccan origin, from a Berber family from Taroudant, who came to France to also be an underground miner, and died as a result of a mine blast.

His mother enrolled him at the age of seven at Conservatoire de Lille, where he studied piano and classical music for sixteen years. He obtained the Conservatory Gold Medal at the age of 23 by performing Maurice Ravel's "Alborada del gracioso" and Frédéric Chopin's "Ballade No. 4". At the same time, he graduated with a university degree in musicology and another degree in piano performance. He later completed his master's degree in law, economics, and management in University of Lyon, and in business administration at École de Management des Industries Créatives in Levallois-Perret.

== Musical style and reception ==
Pamart recognizes Frédéric Chopin, Maurice Ravel, and Claude Debussy as his models in classical piano music, and declares that Chopin is his favorite. Pamart said, "I love his talent for telling stories in his Waltzes, for accompanying moments of life in his Nocturnes. He has the gift of bringing out what is purest at the heart of his music." He also grew up listening to Georges Brassens because of his family. His piano compositions feature sounds with influences to the music of said composers. French classical pianist Henri Barda is also one of the figures who inspire him. He met Barda during his studies in Conservatoire de Lille. Pamart further said, "He taught me accuracy in emotion. Without him, I would not have become what I am." He also believes that his nomadic Berber origins through his mother give him a feeling of freedom and connection which can be found in his music as an influence.

His pianistic style as well as his compositions have their critics. The French jazz pianist Étienne Guéreau described Pamart as "Chopin Wish version, easy version" or even "Richard Clayderman in bad boy mode". The musicologist Alain Duault is reported to have said "I don't consider him a classical pianist at all. His goal isn’t to bring something new to the classical repertoire, but to forge a link with popular music,", even going so far as to compare him to André Rieux or Richard Clayderman, soloists acclaimed by the general public. “I’m still amazed by their ability to fill stadiums."

== Discography ==
=== Studio albums ===
List of studio albums, with selected details
Title	Details	Peak chart positions					Certifications
Title	Details	FRA	FRA Classic	BEL (Wa)	SWI	US Classic	Certifications
Pleine Lune (with Scylla)	Released: 12 October 2018; Label: Abyssal, 88 Touches, Urban [PIAS]; Formats: Physical, digital download, streaming	83	—	16	—	—	SNEP: Gold
Pleine Lune 2 (with Scylla)	Released: 25 October 2019; Label: Abyssal, 88 Touches, Urban [PIAS]; Formats: Physical, digital download, streaming	104	—	36	—	—	
Planet	Released: 22 November 2019; Label: 88 Touches, Urban [PIAS]; Formats: Physical, digital download, streaming	62	1	64	—	—	SNEP: Platinum
Planet Gold	Released: 8 January 2021; Label: 88 Touches, Urban [PIAS]; Formats: Physical, digital download, streaming	88	—	—	—	—	
Loving Life (with Dabeull)	Released: 17 December 2021; Label: 88 Touches; Formats: Physical, digital download, streaming	—	—	—	—	—	
Letter	Released: 11 February 2022; Label: 88 Touches, PIAS; Formats: Physical, digital download, streaming	8	1	5	15	—	SNEP: Platinum
Diamond Tears (with YG Pablo)	Released: 23 June 2023; Label: Sxuper, 88 Touches; Formats: Physical, digital download, streaming	48	—	47	—	—	
Noche	Released: 20 October 2023; Label: 88 Touches, Demain [PIAS]; Formats: Physical, digital download, streaming	4	1	14	46	—	SNEP: Gold
Forever Friends (with NTO)	Released: 14 June 2024; Label: Chapau, 88 Touches, All Night Long; Formats: Physical, digital download, streaming	64	—	—	71	—	
Movie	Released: 17 April 2026; Label: 88 Touches; Formats: Physical, digital download, streaming	5	1	2	38	23	
"—" denotes an album that did not chart or was not released in that territory.

=== Live albums ===
List of live albums, with selected details
Title	Details
Cercle: Sofiane Pamart under the Northern Lights in Lapland, Finland (Live)	Released: 8 September 2021; Label: Cercle; Formats: Digital download, streaming

=== Extended plays ===
List of EPs, with selected details
Title	Details	Peak chart positions			
Title	Details	GER	SWI	US Classic	US CC
Borealis	Released: 30 September 2021; Label: Cercle, 88 Touches, Urban [PIAS]; Formats: Physical, digital download, streaming	—	—	—	—
Dreamers (with Charles Leclerc)	Released: 16 February 2024; Label: Verdigris, 88 Touches; Formats: Physical, digital download, streaming	12	92	2	1
"—" denotes an extended play that did not chart or was not released in that territory.

=== Singles ===
==== As lead artist ====
Title	Year	Album or EP
"L'enfant et la mer" (with Scylla)	2018	Pleine Lune
"Clash" (with Scylla)	2018	Non-album single
"Solitude" (with Scylla)	2018	Pleine Lune
"Voilier" (with Scylla)	2018	Pleine Lune
"Le monde est à mes pieds" (with Scylla)	2018	Pleine Lune
"Clope sur la lune" (with Scylla and Isha)	2018	Pleine Lune
"Seoul"	2019	Planet
"La Havane"	2019	Planet
"Paris"	2019	Planet
"Medellin"	2019	Planet
"Chicago"	2019	Planet
"Olympia" (with Scylla)	2019	Pleine Lune 2
"Sauvage" (with Scylla and Rive)	2019	Pleine Lune 2
"Animal nocturne" (with Scylla and Lonespi)	2019	Pleine Lune 2
"Le Caire"	2019	Planet
"Ha Long Bay"	2020	Planet Gold
"Nara"	2020	Planet Gold
"Solitude"	2021	Letter
"By My Side" (with Dabeull featuring Kunta)	2021	Loving Life
"Bye Bye Honey" (with Dabeull featuring Kunta)	2021	Loving Life
"Love"	2022	Letter
"Asia"	2022	Letter
"I"	2022	Non-album single
"Laisse-moi" (featuring Meyy)	2022	Fils De - Original Soundtrack
"They Said I Was "Just a Musician""	2022	Non-album single
"Magie" (with Y.G. Pablo)	2023	Diamond Tears
"22h22" (with Y.G. Pablo featuring Josman)	2023	Diamond Tears
"Noche"	2023	Noche
"Ferdi" (with Ferdi)	2023	Noche
"Shadow of Tears" (with Trym)	2024	Non-album single
"Loyalty" (with NTO)	2024	Forever Friends
"Nulle part ailleurs" (with Oxmo Puccino)	2024	Non-album singles
"Got to Do It" (with Kunta)	2024	Non-album singles
"Poesía"	2024	Non-album singles
"Le dilemme" (with Doria)	2024	Non-album singles
"Blue (Yes I Love You)" (with YellowStraps & Nelly Furtado)	2024	Non-album singles
"Cent fois" (with Dinos and Hélène Ségara)	2024	Kintsugi
"Montreux palace" (with Ferdi)	2024	Take 01

==== As featured artist ====
Title	Year	Album or EP
"The Whole 9 (Acoustic Version)" (Marina Kaye featuring Sofiane Pamart)	2020	Non-album single
"Noir sur blanc" (Frenetik featuring Sofiane Pamart)	2021	Jeu de couleurs
"V.S.T" (Dioscures featuring Sofiane Pamart)	2021	Ciela
"UCTL" (Gracy Hopkins featuring Sofiane Pamart)	2021	Non-album singles
"Invisible (Piano Version)" (NTO featuring Sofiane Pamart)	2021	Non-album singles
"Alba" (Bon Entendeur featuring Sofiane Pamart)	2021	Minuit
"Revolution" (Chuki Beats featuring Charles and Sofiane Pamart)	2021	Insideout
"I Wish I Had the Time" (Rilès featuring Sofiane Pamart)	2021	Non-album single
"Ce que je vis me manque déjà" (Lonespi featuring Sofiane Pamart)	2021	Après la pluie
"Quelques amis ça suffit" (Georgio featuring Sofiane Pamart)	2021	Ciel enflammé - Sacré
"Vaccin" (Josman featuring Sofiane Pamart)	2022	M.A.N (Black Roses & Lost Feelings)
"Porcelaine" (Furax Barbarossa featuring Sofiane Pamart)	2022	Caravelle
"Sonatine" (Chilla featuring Sofiane Pamart)	2022	Ego
"Zandvoort Palace" (B.B. Jacques featuring Sofiane Pamart)	2022	New Blues, Old Wine
"A otro lado" (Ona Mafalda featuring Sofiane Pamart)	2022	Ona
"Blue (YellowStraps featuring Sofiane Pamart)	2023	Tentacle
"Quand je serai grand" (Niro featuring Sofiane Pamart)	2023	Taulier
"Tulum, México" (Josman featuring Sofiane Pamart)	2023	Non-album single
"Monde à dos" (Y.G. Pablo featuring Sofiane Pamart)	2023	Kiss and Tell
"03.03.22" (Hatik featuring Sofiane Pamart)	2023	Niyya
"Devil May Cry" (Apashe featuring Sofiane Pamart)	2023	Antagonist
"Outro" (Hugo TSR featuring Sofiane Pamart)	2023	Jeudi
"Mélancolie criminelle" (Zamdane featuring Sofiane Pamart)	2024	Solsad
"10h du mat'" (BEN plg featuring Niro and Sofiane Pamart)	2024	Dire je t'aime
"Tant pis" (Rim'K featuring Tif and Sofiane Pamart)	2024	Lifat Mat
"Au revoir" (Malo featuring Sofiane Pamart)	2024	95°
"7 vies" (Lacrim featuring Sofiane Pamart)	2024	Non-album singles
"The Magic" (The Magician featuring Sofiane Pamart and Romuald)	2024	Non-album singles
"Pas une larme" (Pierre Garnier featuring Sofiane Pamart)	2024	Chaque seconde
"Épilogue" (Youssef Swatt's featuring Sofiane Pamart)	2024	Chute Libre

== Honours ==
- 2018: Ambassador for Salon du Luxe Paris
- 2019: Gold Single for the composition of "Matin" - Koba LaD ft. Maes
- 2019: Gold Single for the arrangement of "Journal Perso II" - Vald
