= June Marieezy =

American singer-songwriter

June Marieezy, also known by her stage name ((( O ))), is a Filipino-American singer and songwriter. The artistic moniker ((( O ))) is unpronounceable. The creative punctuation symbolizes the artist's energetic presence. It also makes searching for her online more difficult which is a permanent fixture in keeping her mind off of creating music to gain fame.

== Early life ==
Marieezy was born in Dallas, Texas. Marieezy relocated to the Philippines in 2008 and spent 5 years studying music in Manila.

She chose the unpronounceable name of ((( O ))) because she does not resonate with her birth name. She prefers the energy-based representation of who she is found in her artistic name. Her artistic name makes it difficult to find June's music online which helps her focus on creating music instead of chasing clout.

== Personal life ==
In 2015, Marieezy met her future-husband and fellow musician, French Kiwi Juice (FKJ), while performing on stage at Malasimbo Music and Arts Festival in 2015.

FKJ announced the couple had a child in the winter of 2019 on Instagram. In 2019, the song "100 Roses" was written to commemorate the birth of their newborn child. On July 30, 2021, Marieezy released the music video for "Bayou" announcing her pregnancy and showcasing her belly bump.

== Career ==
During her time in Manila, she cultivated a local audience that has since catapulted her to international stages. She has performed around the world including in Hong Kong, The Juicebox in London, and Urbanscapes in Malaysia.

Marieezy's first and most popular song on Spotify is FKJ's remix of 'Fly' off the Virgo EP. The two also played at the Malasimbo Music & Arts Festival in 2015 in the Philippines.

In 2018, Marieezy announced she would be releasing new music every full moon for 12 years, known as moondrops.

Marieezy was featured in the music video for Vibin' Out with ((( O ))) on FKJ's self-titled album.
