= Gretel Hänlyn =

English singer-songwriter

Maddy Haenlein, better known by her stage name, Gretel (formerly 'Gretel Hänlyn'), is an English singer-songwriter from West London.

== History ==
Haenlein released her debut single Slugeye in September 2021. Haenlin's debut EP, Slugeye, was released in May 2022. Haenlein released her second EP, Head of the Love Club, in March 2023.

In 2023, Haenlein was on a list put out by the Recording Academy as one of "6 Female-Fronted Acts Reviving Rock". Haenlein was also named as one of the "musical artists set to be big in 2023" by Metro.

In January 2026, Haenlein announced the release of her debut album, Squish, in April 2026 via Breadcrumb Records / AWAL.

Squish by Gretel
No.	Title	Length
1.	"Squish"	3:00
2.	"Fire Blooming Trees"
3.	"Maybelline"	2:52
4.	"Unbloom"	3:22
5.	"Laurali"
6.	"Drunk on the Ballroom Floor"
7.	"Darkness, Be My Friend"	4:19
8.	"Pick Your Heart Up"
9.	"Oh Well"
10.	"Witch Hunt"
11.	"Nervous Driver"
12.	"The Perfect Body"

== Awards and nominations ==
Award Ceremony	Year	Work	Category	Result
Berlin Music Video Awards	2023	Drive	Best Editor	Nominated
