= Pierre Garnier =

French singer-songwriter (born 2002)

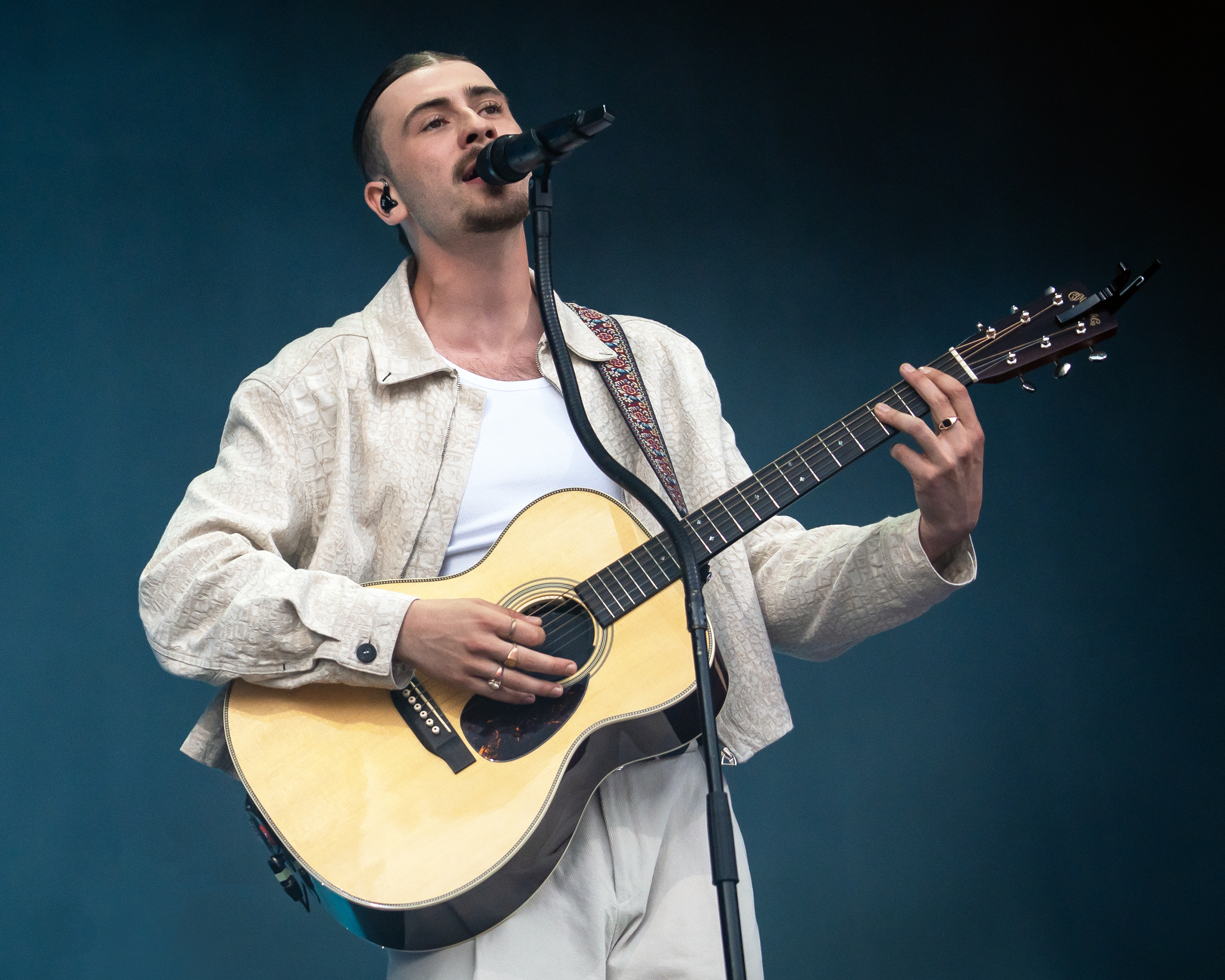
- Garnier in June 2025

Background information
- Born: Pierre Edgar Garnier; 6 March 2002 (age 24); Caen, Calvados, France
- Genre: French pop
- Occupations: Singer; songwriter; musician
- Instruments: Vocals; guitar; piano; drums; bass
- Years active: 2023–present
- Label: Columbia (Sony Music France)

Pierre Edgar Garnier (born 6 March 2002) is a French singer-songwriter and musician.

He rose to prominence through his participation in the television show Star Academy, winning the eleventh season on 3 February 2024, with 55% of the vote. Four days later, he released his single "Ceux qu'on était", which reached number one in less than 24 hours. On 27 February 2024, the track "Ceux qu'on était" was certified gold by the SNEP, just two weeks after its official release. Then, it was certified platinum on 25 March 2024 and diamond on 13 May 2024.

== Early life and education ==
Pierre Garnier grew up in Villedieu-les-Poêles, in the Manche department. His parents, Émilie and Jean-Christophe Garnier, were amateur musicians; his mother was a saleswoman. He attended high school in Avranches, then earned a DUT in marketing techniques at the IUT in Caen and began a degree in applied foreign languages.

== Career ==
=== Star Academy (2023–2024) ===
Garnier rose to prominence by participating in the 2023 edition of the talent show Star Academy, winning it on 3 February 2024. At the age of 21, he won €100,000 and a contract to produce an album with the record label Sony Music France.

=== Chaque seconde (2024–present) ===
On 7 February 2024, Garnier released his single, "Ceux qu'on était", through Sony Music France. The song was written during a party with friends a few weeks before his entry into the Star Academy competition; the song is written to reflect the theme of breakups. Garnier performed it during the final prime time thanks to Dadju, who invited him to sing his own composition. "Ceux qu'on était" broke sales records in less than 24 hours with 2 million streams and became number 1 in the single charts the week of 16 February and become a gold single. In March 2024, Michael Jones invited Garnier to perform at the Dôme de Paris during the Héritage Goldman tour. On 25 March 2024, "Ceux qu'on était" was certified platinum by the SNEP and platinum on May 13.

On 7 June 2024, Garnier released his debut album, Chaque seconde, through Sony Music France, which charted among the top 10 most-streamed albums worldwide on the day of its release (7-10 June 2024). The album sold 19,594 copies in three days and 32,118 copies in one week. Garnier achieved the best debut for a French pop album since the creation of the Top Fusion (including streaming) in 2016. It was certified gold in two weeks, platinum in four months, and double platinum in eight months. The album features the song "Pas une larme", written by himself at the age of 14, for which Sofiane Pamart offered to provide the piano accompaniment and arrangement.

On 14 July 2024, Garnier participated in the Olympic Torch Relay in Paris, between the Palais Garnier and the Olympia. On 31 August 2024, he performed at the "Rose Festival" in Toulouse, as a surprise guest of Bigflo & Oli in front of over 30,000 people. He was nominated for the 2024 NRJ Music Awards in the categories of Francophone Breakthrough of the Year and Francophone Song of the Year, and won both awards. He also won the 2024 MTV Europe Music Awards in the category of Best French Artist. "Chaque seconde" was reissued on 22 November 2024, featuring four previously unreleased tracks. It was the fifth best-selling album in France in 2024, with 172,700 copies sold.

During his first year of career, Garnier was also nominated in two categories at the Victoires de la Musique 2025, Breakthrough Male Artist and Original Song of the Year for his song "Ceux qu'on était". On 14 February 2025, he won the two awards for which he was nominated, also being the only artist of this edition to have won more than one award.

== Musical style ==
Garnier is self-taught; he plays guitar, piano, and drums. He has an easily recognizable vocal signature with his cracked voice. He is inspired by many different styles of music. But his favorite genre is primarily American and English pop, with influences such as Ed Sheeran, James Arthur, Sam Tompkins, Lewis Capaldi, Justin Bieber. He also listens to rap, notably Nekfeu. He grew up listening to rock like Led Zeppelin and Guns N' Roses. He dreams of collaborating with Sheeran and Angèle.

== Charity work ==
On 12 March 2024, Garnier participated in the show "Ce soir on chante pour les 100 ans des droits de l'enfant" (Tonight we sing for the 100th anniversary of children's rights) to benefit UNICEF. On 20 April 2024, he auctioned his gold record for the single "Ceux qu'on était" (Those Who Were) on the Belgian charity show Les Disques d'Or du Télévie. It sold for €37,000, with the proceeds going to cancer research. On 24 June 2024, in Carcassonne, Garnier participated in the show "Ce soir on chante pour les pompiers" (Tonight we sing for the firefighters) to benefit the association "L'œuvre des pupilles", which helps orphans of the firefighters. On 11 November 2024, at the LDLC Arena in Lyon, he attended the football concert benefiting the "Réseau A.Ma.N.D. / Huntington Avenir" (A.M.A.N.D. Network / Huntington Avenir), which helps people affected by neurodegenerative diseases. On 11 December 2024, he performed at the Adidas Arena for the "Nos voix pour toutes" (Our Voices for All) charity concert benefiting the Women's Foundation. The funds raised during the concert were donated to organizations fighting violence against women.

In 2025, Garnier joined the Les Enfoirés troupe to benefit the Restaurants du Cœur.

== Discography ==
=== Studio albums ===
List of studio albums, with selected chart positions, sales and certifications
Title	Details	Peak chart positions				Certifications
Title	Details	FRA	BEL (WA)	BEL (FL)	SWI	Certifications
Chaque seconde	Released: 7 June 2024; Label: Sony Music France; Format: CD, LP, digital download, streaming	1	1	86	4	SNEP: 2× Platinum

=== Singles ===
List of singles, with selected chart positions, showing year released, certifications and album name
Title	Year	Peak chart positions			Certifications	Album
Title	Year	FRA	BEL (WA)	SWI	Certifications	Album
"Ceux qu'on était"	2024	1	1	5	SNEP: Diamond; BEA: 2× Platinum	Chaque seconde
"Nous on sait"	2024	14	11	—	SNEP: Platinum; BEA: Gold	Chaque seconde
"Chaque seconde" (featuring M. Pokora)	2024	34	9	—	SNEP: Platinum	Chaque seconde (deluxe edition)
"Adieu, nous deux"	2024	49	42	—	SNEP: Gold	Chaque seconde (deluxe edition)
"Ce qui me va"	2025	—	49	—		Chaque seconde
"—" denotes a recording that did not chart or was not released in that country.

=== Other charted songs ===
List of other charted songs, showing year released, selected chart positions, and originating album
Title	Year	Peak chart positions	Album
Title	Year	FRA	Album
"Comment faire"	2024	124	Chaque seconde
"Les mots"	2024	144	Chaque seconde
"Chaque seconde"	2024	81	Chaque seconde
"L'horizon"	2024	136	Chaque seconde
"Pas une larme" (featuring Sofiane Pamart)	2024	102	Chaque seconde
"Sur pause"	2024	193	Chaque seconde
"À mes côtés"	2024	190	Chaque seconde
"Comme toi"	2024	191	Chaque seconde
"Tout en mieux"	2024	155	Chaque seconde

== Awards and nominations ==
Year	Award	Category	Nominee/work	Result	Reference
2024	NRJ Music Awards	Pierre Garnier	Francophone Breakthrough of the Year	Won	
2024	NRJ Music Awards	Ceux qu'on était	Francophone Song of the Year	Won	
2024	MTV Europe Music Awards	Pierre Garnier	Best French Artist	Won	
2024	Purecharts Awards	Pierre Garnier	Breakthrough of the Year	Nominated	
2024	Purecharts Awards	Ceux qu'on était	Francophone Song of the Year	Nominated	
2024	Purecharts Awards	Chaque seconde	Francophone Album of the Year	Nominated	
2024	Purecharts Awards	Star Academy	Concert of the Year	Nominated	
2024	W9 d'Or	Pierre Garnier	Breakthrough of the Year	Won	
2024	RTL	Chaque seconde	RTL Album of the Year	Nominated	
2025	Les Bravos d'Or	Pierre Garnier	Personality of the Year	Won	
2025	Ouest-France	Pierre Garnier	Channel of the Year	Won	
2025	La presse de la Manche	Pierre Garnier	Personality of the Year	Won	
2025	Victoires de la Musique	Pierre Garnier	Breakthrough Male Artist	Won	
2025	Victoires de la Musique	Ceux qu'on était	Original Song of the Year	Won	
