= French Kiwi Juice =

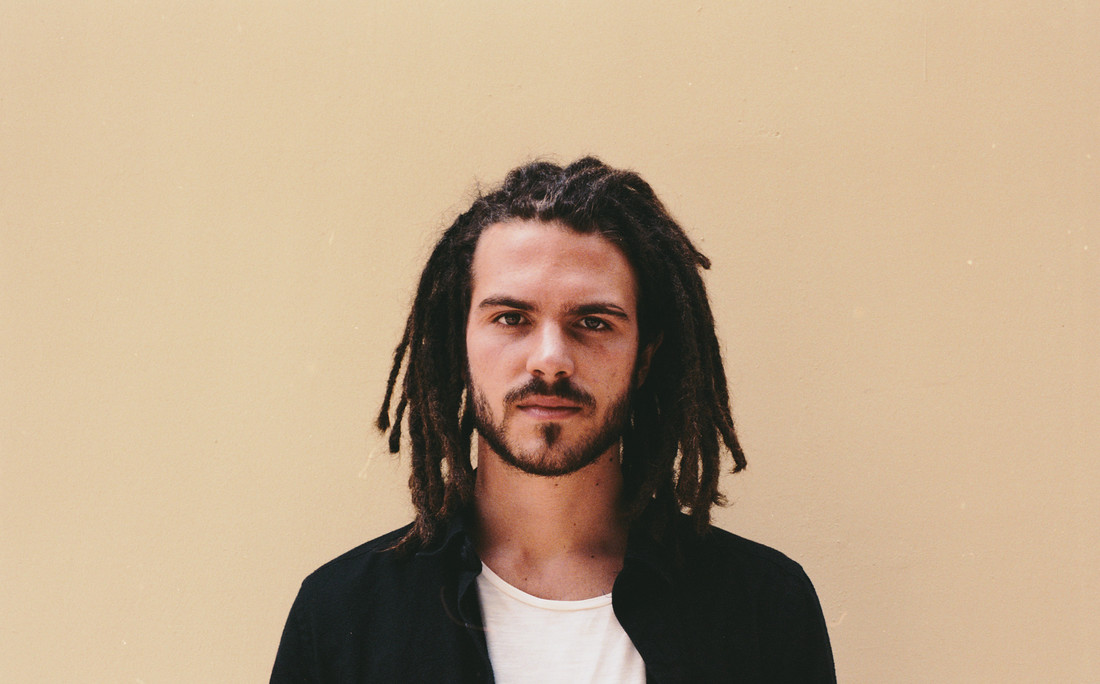
- FKJ in 2015

Background information
- Born: Vincent Fenton; 26 March 1990 (age 36)
- Origin: Tours, France
- Genres: Nu jazz, Electronic, Rhythm and blues, French house
- Occupations: DJ; musician
- Instruments: Keyboards; vocals; guitar; bass guitar; drums; saxophone; double bass; drum machine
- Years active: 2012–present
- Label: Roche Musique
- Website: frenchkiwijuice.com

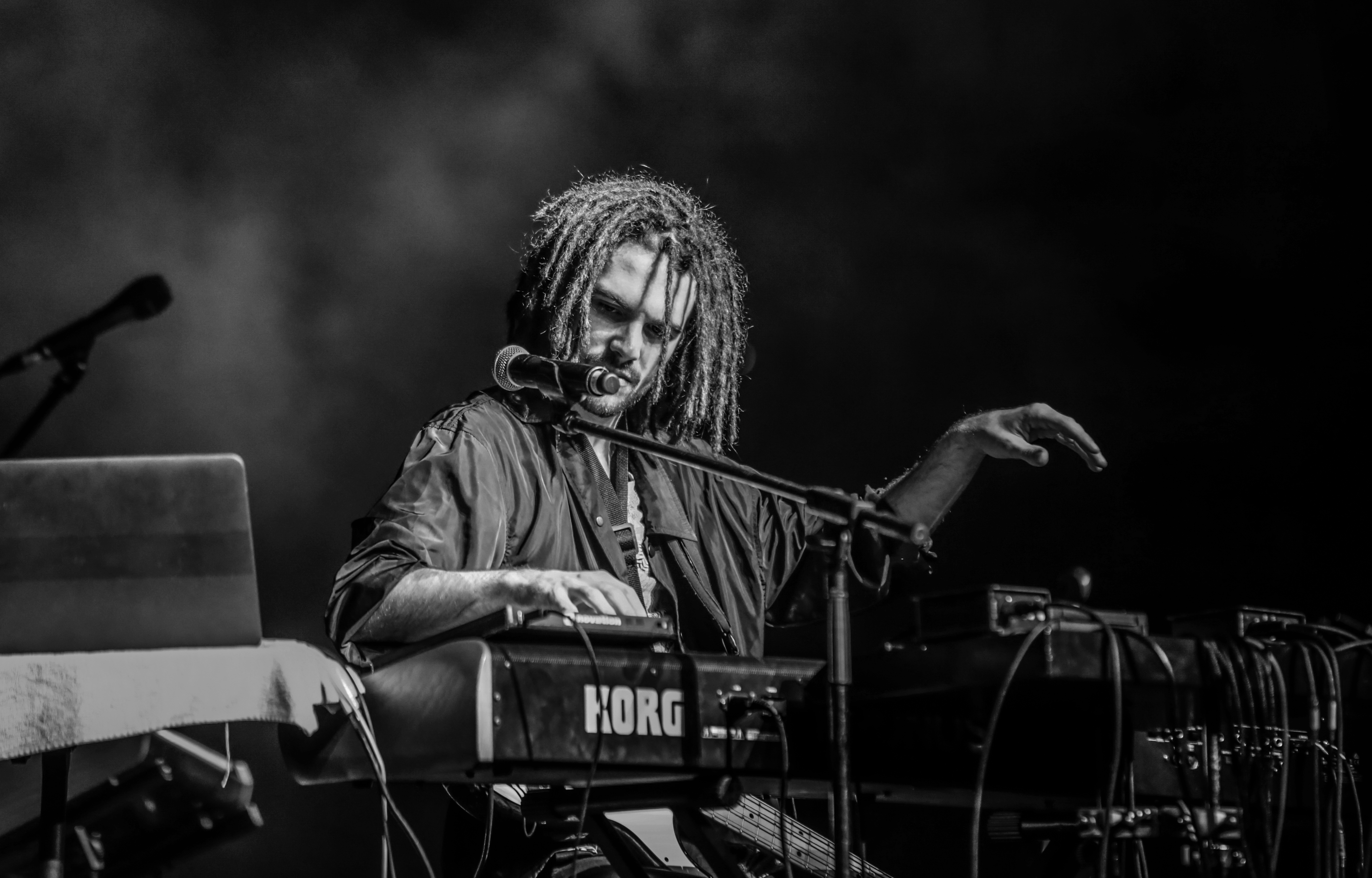
FKJ live in Pune, India (December 2018)

Vincent Fenton (born 26 March 1990), known professionally as French Kiwi Juice or the abbreviation FKJ (sometimes stylized Fkj), is a French multi-instrumentalist, singer, and musician from the city of Tours. He is known for his solo live performances, where he does live loopings through Ableton Live and showcases his multi-instrumentalist skills. His self-titled debut album, French Kiwi Juice, was released on 3 March 2017.

FKJ has performed at music festivals including Coachella, Euphoria, CRSSD, Lollapalooza, and Lightning in a Bottle.

== Career ==
FKJ has been described as a "pioneer" and "one of the flag bearers" of the new New French House genre. He was originally trained in sound engineering for film at a film school.

FKJ achieved significant public attention after the release of the fully improvised song "Tadow" and accompanying studio recording in 2017. He improvised the song with fellow musician Masego, during a day-long recording session that took place just after the musicians met each other.

In April 2017, FKJ announced that he was performing at the 2017 Coachella Valley Music and Arts Festival at the Do Lab Stage.

On 7 April 2022, FKJ performed on his new single "Greener" with Carlos Santana.

On 7 March 2025, FKJ produced and appeared in the song "Intro: Jane" of Ruby (Jennie album)

== Personal life ==
FKJ was born on 26 March 1990 to a mother from France and a father from New Zealand. From a young age, he immersed himself in music from his parents' libraries, including "English rock, Queen, Pink Floyd, The Police... '70s rock, Led Zeppelin... some jazz or Nina Simone, Billie Holiday, Miles Davis... a little bit of French music, but not too much, like Serge Gainsbourg."

In March 2019, FKJ married fellow musician June Marieezy (who uses the stage name ((( O )))) with whom he had previously collaborated, on the track "Vibin' Out". He is said to be based in Palawan, Philippines.

== Discography ==
=== Studio albums ===
| Title | Album details | | |
| Title | Release date | Label | Format |
|---|---|---|---|
| French Kiwi Juice | 3 March 2017 (US) | Roche Musique | CD; Download |
| Just Piano | 13 August 2021 (US) | Mom + Pop | Download |
| Vincent | 10 June 2022 (US) | Mom + Pop Music | CD; Download |

=== EP ===
| Title | Details | | |
| Title | Release date | Label | Format |
|---|---|---|---|
| Ylang Ylang EP | 12 November 2019 | Mom + Pop | CD $\cdot$ Download |

=== Singles ===
| Title | Details | | |
| Title | Release date | Label | Format |
|---|---|---|---|
| "Greener" | 7 April 2022 | Mom + Pop | CD $\cdot$ Download |

=== Collaborations ===
| Title | Details | | | |
| Title | Release date | Label | Artist | Format |
|---|---|---|---|---|
| "NASA" | 29 November 2024 | you.will.knovv | DEAN | Single |
| "Ctrl" | 29 November 2024 | you.will.knovv | DEAN | Single |
