= Parklife (festival) =

Two-day pop and dance music festival in Manchester, England

- Genre: Music Festival
- Frequency: Annually
- Locations: Heaton Park, Prestwich, Bury, Greater Manchester, England
- Coordinates: 53.5347°N 2.2561°W
- Years active: 16 years
- Inaugurated: 12 June 2010
- Founders: Sacha Lord (co-creator)
- Most recent: 20 June 2026 – 21 June 2026
- Next event: 10 July 2027 – 11 July 2027
- Capacity: 82,500
- Organiser: The Warehouse Project; Live Nation Entertainment
- Website: http://www.parklife.uk.com/

Parklife is an annual two-day music festival in Manchester, England and takes place in June each year. The festival predominantly features dance and electronic music, as well as pop and hip-hop artists.

Jointly organised by a number of groups, including Manchester's The Warehouse Project and Live Nation, the festival started life as Mad Ferret Festival in Platt Fields Park, Rusholme, before moving to Heaton Park in north Manchester in 2013 in order to accommodate the increased numbers attending. By 2023 the non-camping festival has a capacity of 82,500 people over the two days.

== Line-ups ==
=== 2010s ===
| Year | Saturday | Sunday |
|---|---|---|
| 2010 | Friendly Fires; Booka Shade; Calvin Harris; Kissy Sell Out; The Japanese Popstars | |
| 2011 | Two Door Cinema Club; Katy B; Kelis; Everything Everything; Beardyman; Fenech Soler; Dutch Uncles; Jaymo & Andy George | Chase & Status; Skream & Benga; Mark Ronson; Annie Mac; Labrinth; Yasmin |
| 2012 | The Flaming Lips; Noah & The Whale; Kelis; The Cuban Brothers; DJ Yoda; plus special guests Chic ft. Nile Rodgers | Dizzee Rascal; Labrinth; Delilah; Murkage; MistaJam; De La Soul |
| 2013 | Plan B; The Maccabees; Jessie Ware; Delphic; Crazy P; Quadron; Trojan Soundsystem | Example; Rita Ora; Rudimental; Wretch 32; Iggy Azalea; Riot Jazz |
| 2014 | Snoop Dogg; Rudimental; Annie Mac; Katy B; Foxes; George Ezra; Bipolar Sunshine; Becky Hill | Foals; Bastille; London Grammar; Sam Smith; Warpaint; Clean Bandit; Ella Eyre |
| 2015 | Disclosure; Wu-Tang Clan; Mark Ronson; Labrinth; Annie Mac; Ella Eyre; Crazy P; Karen Harding | Nas; Rudimental; George Ezra; Jessie Ware; Jungle; Jess Glynne; Fuse ODG; Craig Charles; Grace Jones |
| 2016 | The Chemical Brothers; Ice Cube; Years & Years; Sigma; Stormzy; Gorgon City; Soul II Soul; Grace; Izzy Bizu; Jodie Abacus | Major Lazer; Skepta; Annie Mac; Jess Glynne; Katy B; Earth, Wind & Fire Experience ft. Al Mckay; Wilkinson; WSTRN; Ady Suleiman |
| 2017 | The 1975; Two Door Cinema Club; George Ezra; Chaka Khan; Rat Boy; Cabbage; The Japanese House; Salen; Nicola Bear; Will Orchard | Frank Ocean; Run The Jewels; Jess Glynne; Rag'n'Bone Man; Zara Larsson; Nao; Raye; Now Wave DJs |
| 2018 | The XX; N.E.R.D; Lorde; Sampha; Chimpo; Jessie Ware; Raye; MNEK; Dermot Kennedy; Dance Lady Dance; Nicola Bear | Liam Gallagher; Skepta; CHVRCHES; Everything Everything; Sigrid; Not3s; Nicola Bear |
| 2019 | ~~Cardi B~~; Mark Ronson; Dave; AJ Tracey; Nao; Yxng Bane; Little Simz; Children of Zeus; David Rodigan; Just Banco; Tiffany Calver; Rimon; Rich Reason | George Ezra; The Streets; Khalid; Blossoms; Mabel; Jacob Banks; Lauv; Kero Kero Bonito; Col3trane; Easy Life; Nicola Bear |

=== 2020’s ===
| Year | Saturday | Sunday |
|---|---|---|
| ~~2020~~ | The 2020 festival was cancelled due to the Covid-19 pandemic.: ~~Tyler, the Creator~~; ~~Khalid~~; ~~Lewis Capaldi~~; ~~Skepta~~; ~~Jorja Smith~~; ~~Robyn~~; ~~Anderson .Paak & Free Nationals~~; ~~Giggs~~; ~~Eric Prydz~~; ~~Charli XCX~~; ~~Carl Cox~~; ~~Four Tet~~; ~~Fatboy Slim~~; ~~Aitch~~; ~~D-Block Europe~~; ~~AJ Tracey~~; ~~Hot Chip~~; ~~Mabel (singer)~~ | |
| 2021 | Festival took place in September 2021 due to Covid-19 restrictions | |
| 2021 | Dave; Megan Thee Stallion; AJ Tracey; Burna Boy; Slowthai; Pa Salieu; Mahalia; Ivorian Doll; Wes Nelson | Skepta; D-Block Europe; Mabel; Becky Hill; Migos; Raye; Georgia; Gracey |
| 2022 | 50 Cent; Chase & Status; Loyle Carner; Headie One; Sonny Fodera; Central Cee; Amelie Lens; Charlotte De Witte; Enzo Siragusa; Seth Troxler; Bad Boy Chiller Crew | Tyler, The Creator; Bicep; Eric Prydz; Megan Thee Stallion; Lewis Capaldi; Marco Carola; Patrick Topping; Annie Mac; Overmono; Fred again..; Michael Bibi |
| 2023 | Aitch; Little Simz; Fred again..; Skrillex; The Martinez Brothers; PAWSA; East End Dubs; Peggy Gou; Rudimental; Chris Stussy; Mimi Webb | The 1975; FISHER; The Prodigy; Jamie Jones; Honey Dijon; Ben Hemsley; Wu-Tang Clan + Nas; AZYR; NxWorries; Becky Hill; Charlotte De Witte |
| 2024 | Disclosure; Becky Hill; Peggy Gou; Four Tet; Sugababes; Nia Archives; Digga D; CamelPhat; PAWSA; Dennis Cruz; Sammy Virji b2b Interplanetary Criminal | Doja Cat; FISHER + Chris Lake; J Hus; ANOTR; KAYTRANADA; Folamour; Anne-Marie; Loco Dice; Dom Dolla; Max Dean; Barry Can't Swim |
| 2025 | 50 Cent; Jorja Smith; PAWSA; Rudimental; Flo; Joy Orbison; Steve Angello | Charli XCX; Peggy Gou; Overmono; Barry Can't Swim; Confidence Man; Marc Rebillet; Jodie Harsh; Armand Van Helden |
| 2026 | Sammy Virji; Skepta; Nia Archives; Mall Grab; Josh Baker | Calvin Harris; Zara Larsson; Rudimental; Armand van Helden; Chris Stussy; Kettama; Yousuke Yukimatsu |

== Incidents ==
On 7 June 2014, a 26 year old man was assaulted during a row, he was taken to hospital and died four days later. The attacker has never been found.

That same year on 8 June, two men were stabbed during a fight. One of the men was taken to hospital for treatment, while the other was treated on-site. Two men were arrested.

In June 2024, a massive brawl broke out at the festival with 52 people arrested by Greater Manchester Police for both drug related and violent offences within and outside of the festival grounds during the event.

== Awards and nominations ==
=== DJ Magazine's top 50 festivals ===
| Year | Category | Work | Result | Ref. |
|---|---|---|---|---|
| 2019 | World's Best Festival | Parklife – Manchester, UK | 29th | |

== See also ==
- The Warehouse Project
- List of electronic music festivals
- List of music festivals in the United Kingdom
