= The Temebeats =

English guitar instrumental band

The Temebeats were a guitar instrumental rock band from Worcestershire, England, who were part of the 1960s guitar instrumental revival scene of the 1990s. The BBC reported in 1997 that they were the youngest band in the country playing 1960s guitar instrumentals.

== History ==
=== 1994–1995: Origins of the band as Martley Primary School guitar club ===
The band sprung from the guitar club at Martley Primary School, Worcester, and at the time of interview in 1995 the line up was reported as Dominic O'Brien on lead guitar / rhythm guitar, Michael Munro on rhythm guitar / lead guitar, David Haydon on rhythm guitar, Ben Taylor on bass guitar, and Clive Webb their tutor on backing rhythm guitar, but also that the youngsters would swap the lead guitar role. The band's first public performance was for National Music Day in June 1994 at County Hall, Worcester and they performed at the same event again in June 1995. In February 1995, the band performed at a charity concert to raise money for a local playground project. It took place at Martley Memorial Hall and tickets sold well. Rob Bradford, editor of Pipeline Instrumental Review, saw the band at another concert in June 1995 where their seven-song set included what he described as a "gutsy" version of "Diamonds" and a "thrilling performance" of "The Frightened City" which was "delivered with a lot of verve and style". Munro played lead on both. The band performed at the annual Music in Martley Festival which also took place at Martley Memorial Hall in November 1995.

=== 1996–1997: Local and national fame ===
By January 1996, the Martley Primary School guitar club had been renamed The Temebeats as most of the band members were now at high school. The band name comes from the River Teme in Worcestershire.

In June 1996, the band supported Vince Berkeley, frontman of Pink Peg Slax, at Guitar Fest '96 which took place at Huntingdon Hall, Worcester. In July 1996, the band performed on a float at Worcester Carnival, where, like other performers, it was reported that they were pelted with coins. Notably, O'Brien's guitar was damaged, as reported by Melissa Kite.

On March 30, 1997, the band was one of the headliners at the fifth national annual Pipeline Instrumental Rock Convention which took place at International Students House, London. At the time, BBC Radio 2 DJ, Brian Matthew, reported that The Temebeats were the youngest band in the country performing 1960s instrumental music. The band's setlist included the tunes "Pipeline", "The Man Who Sold the World", "Sleep Walk", "Widow McMurphy's Cat", "The Rise and Fall of Flingel Bunt", "The Truffle Snuffler", and "The Frightened City".

== Discography ==
- 5th Annual Pipeline Instrumental Rock Convention (VHS) (1997)
- 5th Annual Pipeline Instrumental Rock Convention (DVD) (2006)

== See also ==
- The Scorpions (London band)
