= PAWSA =

British techno musician (born 1992)

- Born: David Esekhile; March 31, 1992 (age 34)
- Origin: London, England
- Genres: Tech house
- Occupations: DJ; record producer
- Years active: 2013–present
- Labels: Solid Grooves; PAWZ; Treasure Series; GOLFO TRAXX

David Esekhile (born 31 March 1992), known professionally as PAWSA, is a British DJ and record producer from London, England. Specialising in tech house, he is known for a number of chart hits, international touring, and being the co-founder of Solid Grooves Records. PAWSA has toured internationally, particularly around Europe, and had a summer residency at Sankeys Ibiza. His music has been called "inventive tech house with an old school vibe".

== Career ==
=== Early years ===
PAWSA officially began his musical career in 2014 with the release of his four-track EP “Pilot” through Lost Records. The year prior, he had met fellow tech-house producer Michael Bibi at a warehouse party in London. The two soon began collaborating and, in 2015, they co-founded the Solid Grooves record label. Parties organised by the label began to "take over" the tech-house music scene. In 2017, PAWSA launched his own imprint, PAWZ, to release tracks that did not fit the Solid Grooves sound.

=== Commercial success ===
In 2024, PAWSA solidified his place atop the UK electronic music scene with a string of standout releases that gained mainstream traction. PICK UP THE PHONE was released on May 30 through PAWZ and became one of his most commercially successful tracks to date, charting in the UK Top 50. It is built around a looped and manipulated vocal sample from Nate Dogg’s "Gangsta Walk (Acapella)", specifically the line "Lady, pick it up, it’s me calling." He followed up this release in July with Too Cool To Be Careless, a modern cover of Dennis Edwards & Siedah Garrett’s Don't Look Any Further.

On October 4, 2024, PAWSA dropped highly-anticipated single COLLECT THE COMMAS via CircoLoco Records. In November, he released his rework of Dirty Cash (Money Talks), which peaked at number 3 in the UK Dance chart. By the end of the year, the track had amassed 56.9 million Spotify streams—far surpassing his other songs on the platform. He was invited to "take control" of the BBC Radio 1 Essential Mix, delivering a two hour set consisting of his own music and tracks from other artists including Eddie Richards and Dauwd.

PAWSA's momentum carried into 2025 with the release of his latest track, DOUBLE C, which was featured on the official soundtrack of F1 the Movie.

=== GOLFOS ===
In addition to his work under his own name, PAWSA is one half of GOLFOS, a collaborative project with Spanish DJ and producer Dennis Cruz. GOLFOS began formally in 2018, with early ideas reportedly emerging during a joint stay in Ibiza.

In 2023, GOLFOS delivered a standout b2b performance at the Kappa Futur Festival in Turin, which has been widely circulated via SoundCloud and YouTube. The set featured some of the duo's deeper cuts like “Hole 9” and “Feeling Good (JBL Mix)."

=== Treasure Series ===
PAWSA is also the producer behind the anonymous Treasure Series project, which began releasing tracks on streaming services in 2019. The series often features minimal, tech house reworks of popular songs. Each release is typically restricted to 250 physical copies and accompanied by a digital download code. Though not explicitly crediting PAWSA, many of the tracks have been featured in his live sets and share stylistic characteristics with his solo productions. The series includes songs such as Thirty Thousand, Jungle VIP, Ruffneck Brother, and My Favourite Girl.

=== Awards and recognition ===
In 2021, PAWSA won the "Best Producer" category at the DJ Mag Best of Britain awards. The Mixmag music magazine ranked him at #19 in their list of the top producers who had "defined the year" 2024, stating he is influential in "pushing deep house and dancefloor classics".

== Discography ==
PAWSA singles
Title	Artist	Year	Peak UK singles	Peak UK Dance
"PICK UP THE PHONE"	PAWSA ft. Nate Dogg	2024	49	13
"Too Cool To Be Careless"	PAWSA	2024	51	8
"COLLECT THE COMMAS"	PAWSA	2024	-	-
"Dirty Cash (Money Talks)"	PAWSA / Adventures of Stevie V	2024	17	3
"BANG BANG"	PAWSA	2025	-	-
"DOUBLE C"	PAWSA	2025	-	-

== See also ==
- List of club DJs
