= The Packabeats =

The Packabeats were a British instrumental rock band who are best known for their 1961 UK hit, "Gypsy Beat" and for "The Traitors" which was used as the theme tune to the 1962 film, The Traitors.

== History ==
=== Origins of the band ===
When skiffle music arrived in the UK in about 1956, Ian Stewart formed his own skiffle group at Rutlish Grammar School in Merton Park, London, in which he played drums and that was known as The Blackjacks. His friends, Robin Housego played tea-chest bass, and Mick Flynn and Laurie Bellamy played acoustic guitars. They rehearsed songs by Lonnie Donegan and also by Ken Colyer and The Vipers. There were several other skiffle bands in the area who The Blackjacks exchanged members with and at one point they had eight band members. Once the band line up had settled down, the core members began to venture out into London's West End where they met vocalist, Emile Ford.

=== As backing group to Dave Cameron ===
They next met a vocalist named Dave Cameron who they became the backing band for as Dave Cameron & The Packabeats. The band name had been settled on when a friend of theirs had been listening to Sam Costa on his Midday Spin radio programme and he summed up a song as having "Not much of a melody, but it sure packs a beat". At this point the band consisted of Ian Stewart on drums, Mick Flynn on guitar, Mick's cousin Nigel on double bass, and John Berryman on lead guitar. By the late 1950s, the Putney Ballroom had become one of their regular live venues and they were performing covers by Buddy Holly, Ricky Nelson, The Everly Brothers, and Elvis Presley. Around this time, another school friend, Brian Lewis, replaced Nigel with an electric bass. The Packabeats television debut came when three of them, Dave Cameron, Mick Flynn, and Ian Stewart, performed backing harmonies for Emile Ford when he sang Conway Twitty's "It's Only Make Believe" on BBC TV's Six-Five Special. Dave Cameron & The Packabeats then came under the management of Bob Alexander who arranged for them to perform not only at Putney Ballroom but also at The Athenaeum in Muswell Hill where he arranged for the band to begin residency. Having two live bases on different sides of London led to many more gigs being performed elsewhere. RG Jones Sound Engineering had a recording studio in Morden, where in 1960, Dave Cameron & The Packabeats recorded "Baby I Love You" and "Right Here On Earth".

=== Gypsy Beat ===
Dave Cameron decided that he wanted to settle down and left the band to join his father's business and John Berryman left as well. The Packabeats then recruited Tony Holland as vocalist and Ken Eade as guitarist, both of whom were from a band called The Bluenotes. In the studio in Morden this line up of the band recorded "Yes, Sir That's My Baby", "Wiggle", "You Were Meant Only For Me", and as suggested by Ken Eade, an instrumental tune he had been working on called "Gypsy Beat". A copy of the recordings was sent to EMI who replied that they were only interested in the instrumental recording. The band's debut single, "Gypsy Beat", charted at number 49 on the UK singles chart in March 1961 on the Parlophone record label. The single's b-side, "Big Man" was presented to the band by EMI who asked them to record it and it had been written by their A & R man, Johnnie Spence. The band recorded it at Abbey Road Studios and the single was heavily promoted on the dance hall circuit. Following this the band's founding guitarist, Mick Flynn, left the band and he was replaced by Derrick Leach who had been in Tony Holland's earlier band. Recordings by this line up were produced by the band but were not released. Following this Ken Eade and Brian Lewis also left the band. They were replaced by Ted Harvey on bass and Malcolm Lenny on guitar.

=== The Traitors ===
The new line up of the band now known as Tony Holland & The Packabeats, featuring Derrick Leach on organa and cembalet, recorded an EP at RG Jones studio which included the songs, "Pretend", "Twisting The Night Away", "Wonderful Life", and "Here Comes That Feeling" in October 1962. All of the songs were vocal performances. Bob Alexander contacted producer Joe Meek who upon hearing the recordings immediately booked them in for a recording session. Meek presented them with a recording of an instrumental tune called "The Traitors" which he asked them to work on. Meek recorded the band performing "The Traitors" and it was used as the theme tune to the 1962 film, The Traitors. According to Pipeline magazine editor, Dave Burke, the tune "The Traitors" picked up quite a lot of airplay, not least because it was the theme tune to a British cops and robbers movie but because it was written by Johnny Douglas, and Ian Stewart recalled that it was played during intermissions at cinemas all over the country. "Evening in Paris" was the single's a-side and it was released on Pye Records. The band appeared on the radio show, The Talent Spot to promote the release.

=== Later releases and disbandment ===
Two more singles that Meek had recorded by the band were released, the instrumentals, "Dream Lover" / "Packabeat", and a single with vocalist Tony Holland, "The Sidewalk" / "Time Goes By". There was quite a lot of promotion for "The Sidewalk" but even though The Packabeats performed on it, it was released under the title of a solo single by Tony Holland. This was because Meek had leased the release through HMV and the band was signed to Pye Records. EMI even printed a leaflet with instructions of how to do The Sidewalk and the song was heavily played on Radio Luxembourg's Dancing Party. Tony Holland also performed it live on ITV's Thank Your Lucky Stars, but not with The Packabeats but with a backing group of young girls.

Meek's recording of the band's next single, "Dream Lover", brought him into dispute with the band. Despite their protests, Meek speeded up the tape which raised the pitch of the lead instrument, the organa. He then recorded a repeat of the keyboard line and overdubbed it onto the original, even though you could not change the pitch of the organa, which Pipeline magazine said "left the instrument sounding worryingly like an anguished klaxon". The recording of the single's b-side, Packabeat, which had been written by Meek under his pseudonym, Peter Lawrence, was more successful but from this point onward, The Packabeat's relationship with him deteriorated considerably. Ian Stewart later recalled that Meek was unreliable and sometimes didn't turn up to recording sessions. By the beginning of 1964 the band was starting to fall apart and the success of The Beatles brought a whole new wave of bands onto the dancehall and pub circuit who were prepared to undercut the price of pro bands such as The Packabeats. Ted Harvey then left the band and went on to tour with Duane Eddy in the United States but he was replaced by Gary Unwin. In June 1964, the band made some final recordings at the Cellar Club studios in Kingston, but disbanded at their last gig in Edmonton, London in July 1964.

In 2004, The Packabeats re-formed and performed at the Pipeline Instrumental Convention in London.

== Legacy ==
Randall Hemmingsen, brother of Piers Hemmingsen, who are both credited with breaking The Beatles in Canada, included The Packabeats in his list of favourite bands in 1962. In Goldmine's British Invasion Record Price Guide, Tim Neely and Dave Thompson valued The Packabeat's singles "Gypsy Beat" / "Big Man", "Evening in Paris" / "The Traitors", and "Dream Lover" / "Packabeat" at $6 each if in "near-mint" condition. They also valued Tony Holland's single, "The Sidewalk" / "Time Goes By", on which The Packabeats are the uncredited backing band, at $12 if in "near-mint" condition. In Record Collector's Rare Record Price Guide 2020, The Packabeats' singles were valued at £15 for "Gypsy Beat" / "Big Man" if in "mint" condition, and £20 each for "Evening in Paris" / "The Traitors" and "Dream Lover" / "Packabeat" if in "mint" condition.

== Discography ==
=== Singles ===
Year	Single	Record label/Cat No.	Chart Positions
Year	Single	Record label/Cat No.	UK
1961	"Gypsy Beat" / "Big Man"	Parlophone / 45–R4729	49
1962	"Evening in Paris / "The Traitors"	Pye Records / 7N15480	–
1963	"The Sidewalk" / "Time Goes By" (vocals by Tony Holland)	HMV / pop1135	–
1963	"Dream Lover" / "Packabeat"	Pye Records / 7N15549	–

=== Compilation albums ===
- Then And Now! (2006).

== See also ==
- The Cougars
- The Scorpions (London band)
