= Dirty Cash (Money Talks) =

1989 single by the Adventures of Stevie V

Single by the Adventures of Stevie V

from the album Adventures of Stevie V
- Released: 4 December 1989
- Genre: Hip house
- Length: 3:50
- Label: Mercury
- Songwriters: Mick Walsh; Stevie Vincent
- Producer: Stevie Vincent

The Adventures of Stevie V singles chronology
"Dirty Cash (Money Talks)" (1989)	"Body Language" (1990)

Music video
- "Dirty Cash (Money Talks)" on YouTube

"Dirty Cash (Money Talks)" is a song by British dance music act the Adventures of Stevie V. It was first released in December 1989 on the Mercury record label, then again in 1990. The 1990 release peaked at number two on the UK Singles Chart, reached number one in the Netherlands, and topped both the US Billboard Dance Club Play chart and the Canadian RPM Dance chart. The song is composed by Mick Walsh and Stevie Vincent (Stevie V), and features vocals by American singer Melody Washington. It was featured on the act's debut album, Adventures of Stevie V (1990), and received a silver certification in the UK with a sale of 200,000 singles.

In 1997, "Dirty Cash" was re-released as a remastered '97 remix, and in June 2014, the song was remixed by Alan Fitzpatrick. In 2024, it was featured in the American biographical crime drama television series Monsters: The Lyle and Erik Menendez Story and that same year, PAWSA released a new version of the song that peaked at number 17 on the UK Singles Chart. In 2013, Australian music channel Max included "Dirty Cash" in their list of "1000 Greatest Songs of All Time".

== Background and release ==
The idea with the act The Adventures of Stevie V was to work with different musicians, dancers and people in the music industry. Stevie Vincent a.k.a. Stevie V had previously worked with lyricist Mick Walsh and they wrote the lyrics for "Dirty Cash". He told in a 2025 interview, "I said, 'I want to do a track that's not about love. I want to do something a bit hardcore.' And I said, 'Like, money.' He [Walsh] being the sort of lyricist that he was took it away and came back with this 'money talks, money talks', which I thought was brilliant. However I wanted a bit more to it. Experimenting with rhythms of lyrics if you like. And that's where the 'dirty cash I want you, dirty cash I need you' that's where that came." At the time, Vincent worked as an electronic engineer and had recently put his studio together, using equipment such as a Roland D110, an Akai sampler and a C1000 microphone. The female singer on "Dirty Cash", Melody Washington, was a music teacher from Georgia, living in the UK and teaching for the US Air Force. She met Stevie V while she was playing in one of his friend's band. He was captivated by her voice, "She had one of those real warm voices and she could deliver a real straightforward lyric without being too fussy." Washington was quite religious and therefore wasn't sure if she wanted to be involved in a song with such risqué lyrics.

A friend and DJ passed by as Vincent was doing one of the final mixes of the track, and heard it. The friend thought it was amazing and asked for a copy. He had label Mercury Records calling Vincent 24 hours later and signing him. "Dirty Cash" was released on 4 December 1989, but only reached number 100 on the UK Singles Chart on 16 December. Vincent was told that he risked being cleared out by the label after this. However, in January the following year, the label called him, telling him that they had received so many request for the song that they had to relook the whole situation. In April 1990, it was re-released, becoming the labels biggest song of the year. As "Dirty Cash" reached number 28 on the UK Singles Chart, the Adventures of Stevie V performed it on the Top of the Pops. Vincent told, "If you're a footballer, you want to play at Wembley. But as a musician, it's about getting on Top of the Pops." The demand for the track was huge and it was subsequently released in the US.

In 1997, 2014 and 2024, "Dirty Cash" was released in new remixes. After British DJ and record producer PAWSA released his remix in 2024, which peaked at number 17 on the UK Singles Chart, Stevie V said, "I'd heard PAWSA's production and I thought it was fabulous. Really pleasantly surprised they managed to get it together and put it out, you know, and it's wonderful that it's doing as well as it is, for it to be where it is again 30 years later. It's just incredible. Especially if you look at dance music, you don't expect to have longevity much more. 30 years."

== Critical reception ==
David Taylor-Wilson from Bay Area Reporter stated that the song "has all the ingredients for a solid dance hit, with a style somewhat reminiscent of Soul II Soul." Bill Coleman from Billboard magazine described it as a "seductive house track with an underground sensibility sports a tasty vocal hook and top of the chart potential." Another Billboard editor, Larry Flick, named it "a scathing, house-fueled ode to capitalism". Ernest Hardy from Cash Box called it "a biting-yet-melancholy melding of dance, rap, and R&B that contrasts a hard rap with caressing female vocals." He concluded, "It's one of the year's best singles, and one of the most misunderstood." Dave Sholin from the San Francisco-based Gavin Report remarked that the British-based writer/producer had spent six weeks Top Ten in the UK with the track, "selling a quarter million copies in the process—no easy task in that market." He praised it as a "exceptional entry."

Pan-European magazine Music & Media commented, "This is top-rate hiphouse. There is a killer beat, a brilliant chorus, a funky sax, all bound together with a liberal dash of humour. Perhaps more importantly though, it all sounds refreshing and new." The Network Forty wrote that the track is "almost a mood piece" and noted that it "has a soulful vocal approach backed by a Euro-dance production somewhat reminiscent of the Pet Shop Boys." Miranda Sawyer from Smash Hits labeled it as "hip-house at its most brilliantly scuzzy. A bump and grind bass and Adamski-like fiddly bit drives this heavy rap and hookline scudding along. Top." Stewart Walker from Toledo Blade remarked in his album review, that Stevie V. "blends aspects of both musical forms well [hip-hop and house music] to produce a polished sound" that is best illustrated on "Dirty Cash (Money Talks)".

== Chart performance ==
In Europe, "Dirty Cash" reached number one in the Netherlands for two weeks in July 1990 and was a top-10 hit also in Belgium, Ireland, Luxembourg and the United Kingdom. In the latter country, it peaked at number two during its eighth week on the UK Singles Chart, on 6 May 1990, and stayed within the UK chart for 16 weeks. "Dirty Cash" also was a top 20-hit in Austria, Switzerland and West Germany. On the Eurochart Hot 100, it peaked at number seven on 19 May, after four weeks on the chart.

Outside Europe, the single reached number one on both the US Billboard Dance Club Play and 12-inch Singles Sales charts and the Canadian RPM Dance chart, as well as reaching numbers 23 and 25 on the Cash Box Top 100 and Billboard Hot 100. In Oceania, it charted in Australia and New Zealand, peaking at numbers 18 and 34, respectively. And in West Asia, it reached number two in Israel, in its third week on the chart, on 10 June, 1990. It spent seven weeks inside the Israeli top 30. "Dirty Cash" received a silver certification in the UK after 200,000 singles were sold there.

== Music video ==
There was produced a music video to promote the single. Stevie V. said in an interview about the video, "Budget was like three grand for a video, which is laughable, really. We wore our own clothes. Yeah, we had to pay for all of that ourselves. It's a good video, the interesting thing is that that was a three grand to make the video. They spent $9,000 to re-edit it for the American market."

== Track listing ==
7-inch single, UK (1989)
No.	Title	Length
1.	"Dirty Cash" (Radio Edit)
2.	"Dirty Cash" (Hard Cash Mix)

12-inch single, UK (1989)
No.	Title	Length
1.	"Dirty Cash (Money Talks)" (Dime And Dollar Mix)	7:23
2.	"Dirty Cash (Money Talks)" (Hard Cash Mix)	7:25
3.	"Dirty Cash (Money Talks)" (Dirty Rap)	3:56

CD single, UK (1989)
No.	Title	Length
1.	"Dirty Cash" (Radio Edit)	3:50
2.	"Dirty Cash (Money Talks)" (Dime & Dollar Mix)	5:52
3.	"Dirty Cash (Money Talks)" (Hard Cash Mix)	6:19
4.	"Dirty Cash" (Dirty Rap)	3:57

== Charts ==
=== Original version ===
==== Weekly charts ====
1989–1990 weekly chart performance for "Dirty Cash (Money Talks)"
Chart (1989–1990)	Peak position
Australia (ARIA)	18
Austria (Ö3 Austria Top 40)	13
Belgium (Ultratop 50 Flanders)	3
Canada Dance/Urban (RPM)	1
Europe (Eurochart Hot 100)	7
Ireland (IRMA)	10
Israel (Israeli Singles Chart)	2
Luxembourg (Radio Luxembourg)	2
Netherlands (Dutch Top 40)	1
Netherlands (Single Top 100)	1
New Zealand (Recorded Music NZ)	34
Switzerland (Schweizer Hitparade)	16
UK Singles (Official Charts)	2
US Billboard Hot 100	25
US 12-inch Singles Sales (Billboard)	1
US Dance Club Play (Billboard)	1
US Hot Black Singles (Billboard)	75
US Cash Box Top 100	23
West Germany (GfK)	20

1997 weekly chart performance for "Dirty Cash (Money Talks)"
Chart (1997)	Peak position
Scottish Singles Sales (Official Charts)	94
UK Singles (Official Charts)	69

2024 weekly chart performance for "Dirty Cash (Money Talks)"
Chart (2024)	Peak position
Greece International (IFPI)	84

==== Year-end charts ====
1990 year-end chart performance for "Dirty Cash (Money Talks)"
Chart (1990)	Position
Belgium (Ultratop 50 Flanders)	25
Canada Dance/Urban (RPM)	30
Europe (Eurochart Hot 100)	34
Germany (Media Control)	80
Israel (Israeli Singles Chart)	28
Netherlands (Dutch Top 40)	8
Netherlands (Single Top 100)	9
UK Singles (OCC)	19
UK Club Chart (Record Mirror)	35
US 12-inch Singles Sales (Billboard)	12
US Dance Club Play (Billboard)	17

2025 year-end chart performance for "Dirty Cash (Money Talks)"
Chart (2025)	Position
Netherlands (Single Top 100)	45

=== PAWSA version ===
==== Weekly charts ====
Weekly chart performance for "Dirty Cash (Money Talks)" – PAWSA version
Chart (2024–2025)	Peak position
Belgium (Ultratop 50 Flanders)	5
Belgium (Ultratop 50 Wallonia)	44
Czech Republic Singles Digital (ČNS IFPI)	99
Estonia Airplay (TopHit)	34
Greece International Streaming (IFPI)	67
Ireland (IRMA)	28
Latvia Airplay (LaIPA)	12
Romania Airplay (TopHit)	45
Slovakia Airplay (ČNS IFPI)	45
UK Singles (Official Charts)	17
UK Dance (Official Charts)	3
UK Indie (Official Charts)	2
US Hot Dance/Electronic Songs (Billboard)	18

==== Monthly charts ====
Monthly chart performance for "Dirty Cash (Money Talks)" – PAWSA version
Chart (2025)	Peak position
Estonia Airplay (TopHit)	53
Romania Airplay (TopHit)	49

==== Year-end charts ====
Year-end chart performance for "Dirty Cash (Money Talks)" – PAWSA version
Chart (2025)	Position
Belgium (Ultratop 50 Flanders)	19
Belgium (Ultratop 50 Wallonia)	164
Lithuania Airplay (TopHit)	155
Netherlands (Dutch Top 40)	50
Romania Airplay (TopHit)	148
US Hot Dance/Electronic Songs (Billboard)	41

== Certifications ==
Certification for "Dirty Cash (Money Talks)"
Region	Certification	Certified units/sales
Italy (FIMI) Sales since 2009	Gold	100,000^{‡}
Netherlands (NVPI) PAWSA version	Gold	46,500^{‡}
New Zealand (RMNZ)	Gold	15,000^{‡}
United Kingdom (BPI)	Silver	200,000^{‡}
^{‡} Sales+streaming figures based on certification alone.

== Cover versions ==
A remix of "Dirty Cash (Money Talks)" was released in late 2009, mixed by Funk K called "Dirty Cash 2009". "Dirty Cash" was covered by Liberty X, and featured on their 2005 album, X.

"Dirtee Cash", a song recorded by the grime artist Dizzee Rascal, based on "Dirty Cash", was released as the fourth single from Dizzee Rascal's fourth studio album, Tongue N' Cheek in September 2009 and peaked at number ten on the UK Singles Chart. At the 2010 BRIT Awards, Florence Welch, from Florence and The Machine was joined by Dizzee Rascal to perform a mash-up of her version of "You Got the Love" and his "Dirtee Cash". The mash-up, entitled ""You Got the Dirtee Love"", was released on 17 February 2010, one day after the BRITs performance.

A new version of the track produced by London-based producer PAWSA was released in November 2024 and peaked at number 17 on the UK Singles Chart. On 19 September 2025, it was certified gold by the British Phonographic Industry (BPI).

== See also ==
- List of number-one dance singles of 1990 (U.S.)
