= The Cougars =

English band

The Cougars were a short-lived English band, formed in Bristol, England, in 1961. They specialised in rock music, mostly instrumental versions of pop and classical pieces.

== Career ==
The band, comprising Keith Owen (lead guitar) (1942 – 2019), Dave Tanner (rhythm guitar) (born 1942), Adrian Morgan (bass guitar) (1943 – 7 December 2023) and Dave Hack (drums) (born 1940), signed a recording contract with Parlophone in 1963, after having been spotted at a talent contest by EMI's A&R man, Norrie Paramor.

Their single "Saturday Nite at the Duck-Pond" used music from Swan Lake by Pyotr Ilyich Tchaikovsky. The song achieved some notoriety for being banned by the BBC, despite which it spent eight weeks in the UK Singles Chart, peaking at No. 33. The reason for the ban was reported in the musical press, saying Saturday Nite at the Duck Pond was "a travesty of a major classical work". Their songs "Red Square" and "Caviare and Chips" also borrowed themes from Tchaikovsky. The Cougars' final session for Parlophone was on 16 December 1963, when they recorded "Caviare and Chips", "While The City Sleeps" and "Sausage Roll", although the latter track remains unreleased. After recording three singles and an EP, The Cougars disbanded in 1964.

"Saturday Nite at the Duck-Pond" is included in the anthology 20 One Hit Wonders, published on the label See For Miles and on EMI's Instrumental Greats of the 60's (CDB 7 94226 2 – 1990). "Fly-By-Nite" is on Instrumental Diamonds – Jumpin (Sequel Records – NEXCD 149 – 1990).

In 1996, the band performed at the Pipeline Instrumental Rock Convention in London.

Bass guitarist Adrian Morgan was born Adrian Jeffrey Morgan 1943, Newport, South Wales and died on 7 December 2023, Yeovil, Somerset at the age of 80.

== Discography ==
=== Singles ===
Year	Single	Record label/Cat No.	Chart Positions
Year	Single	Record label/Cat No.	UK
1963	"Saturday Nite at the Duck-Pond" / "See You in Dreamland"	Parlophone R 4989	33
1963	"Red Square" / "Fly-By-Nite"	Parlophone R 5038	–
1963	"Saturday Nite with the Cougars"	Parlophone GEP 8886	–
1964	"Caviare And Chips" / "While The City Sleeps"	Parlophone R 5115	–

In Goldmine's British Invasion Record Price Guide, Tim Neely and Dave Thompson valued The Cougars' singles, if in "near mint" condition, at $10 for "Saturday Nite at the Duck-Pond" / "See You in Dreamland", $15 for "Red Square" / "Fly-By-Nite", $15 for "Caviare And Chips" / "While The City Sleeps", and $25 for the EP, Saturday Night With The Cougars. In Record Collector's Rare Record Price Guide 2020, The Cougars' singles, if in "mint" condition, were valued at £10 for "Saturday Nite at the Duck-Pond" / "See You in Dreamland", £10 for "Red Square" / "Fly-By-Nite", £10 for "Caviare And Chips" / "While The City Sleeps", and £30 for the EP, Saturday Night With The Cougars.

== See also ==
- List of songs banned by the BBC
- The Packabeats
- The Scorpions (London band)
