= Los Jets =

Spanish rock band

Los Jets, also known as Los 4 Jets and J.E.T.S., were a Spanish rock band who were most popular in the 1960s and who had three number-one hits in Spain.

== History ==
=== Formation ===
Los Jets were first formed in 1958 by Jose Maria and Santiago Gonzalez as a duo but who were then performing under the name Los Magicos. They were later joined by lead guitarist Tony Reinozo and drummer and singer Ediberto Guzman and the band name was then changed to Los Jets. Tony Reinozo was later replaced by Ricky Morales who in turn was replaced by his younger brother Junior Morales.

=== Chart success ===
The band had three tracks that were number one on the Spanish Hitparade: "Zorongo" in 1961, "Serenata Huasteca" in 1962, and "Guitarra Enamorada" in 1963. A fourth track, "Maria De La O" made the Spanish top ten. "Guitarra Enamorada" was their version of The Fentones' "Lover's Guitar". The band cited their main influences as Elvis Presley, Cliff Richard, and The Shadows and did cover versions of Presley's and The Shadows' music when they played live, including many instrumental numbers. Accordingly, they have been referred to as "The Spanish Shadows". The band split up in 1965.

=== New lineups and later releases ===
The band reformed in 1981 with Santiago as the only original member and the band's new name was then J.E.T.S. with each letter representing the initial of each band member's first name: Jcose Gonzalez on bass, Eduardo Bartrina on drums, Tony Soler on lead guitar and Santiago Gonzalez on rhythm guitar and vocals. In 1988, this lineup of the band achieved a number 1 album in Spain with Vuelo Rasante before the band went their separate ways again.

In 1997, Santiago once again reformed the band with another new lineup consisting of Alberto Nuevo on bass, Julio Tavza on keyboard, Eduardo Bartrina on drums and Santiago on rhythm guitar and vocals. This lineup had a number 1 album in Spain with Los Jets Are Back. In 2002, the band performed at the Pipeline Instrumental Rock Convention in London, and again in 2005, and 2008.

== Discography ==
=== Singles ===
Year	Single	Chart positions
Year	Single	SPN Hitparade
1961	"Zorongo"	1
1962	"Serenata Huasteca"	1
1963	"Guitarra Enamorada"	1
1963	"Maria De La O"	
1991	"Runaway/Vuelo Rasante"	-

=== EPs ===
- Los 4 Jets (1961).
- Los 4 Jets (1962).
- Los 4 Jets (1963).
- Los 4 Jets (1969).

=== Albums ===
- Jets 20 Anos Despues (1982) LP.
- Los Jets 1965 - Grabaciones Ineditan (1985) LP.
- Los 4 Jets (1985) LP.
- 20 Anos Despues (1986) LP.
- Vuelo Rasante (1990) CD. SPN #1.
- Jets Flying High (1994) CD.
- Jets Rarezas (1994) CD.
- Lo Mejor De Jets (1995) CD.
- J. Eduardo. T. Santiago. Mano A Mano (1996) CD.
- Los Jets Are Back (1998) CD. SPN #1.
- El Innoviable Show (2000) CD.
- A Tribute to The Shadows (2001) CD.
- A Tribute to Johnny & The Hurricanes (2001) CD.

=== Compilations ===
- Jets 35 Anniversarie (1994) 5x CD box set.
