= The Rapiers =

British instrumental rock band

The Rapiers are a British instrumental rock band. They have served as the backing group to many famous vocal performers as well as performing as an instrumental band in a 1960s style.

== History ==
An A-side from the band's self-titled debut EP charted at number one on the UK rockabilly chart in 1983 and one of its B-sides also made the Top Ten on the same chart. In October 1983, the band performed at the Isle of Wight Garlic Festival, which includes a 1960s music festival. The band's debut album, Straight To The Point, charted on the UK Indie chart in 1985.

The band was the cover story of the first issue of Pipeline Instrumental Review in 1989.

The Rapiers have performed as the backing band to many famous performers including Cliff Richard, Billy J. Kramer, John Leyton, Hank Marvin, Jet Harris, Freddy Cannon, Screaming Lord Sutch, Brian Poole, Bert Weedon, Wee Willie Harris, Tommy Bruce, Eden Kane, Mike Berry, Charlie Gracie, Billie Davis, Linda Gail Lewis, Heinz, Tony Jackson, Denny Laine, Dave Sampson, Freddie Garrity, Alvin Stardust, Jess Conrad, Terry Dene, Russ Sainty, Mike Sheridan, Vince Eager, and Freddie "Fingers" Lee.

The Rapiers performed at the Pipeline Instrumental Rock Convention in 1994, and again in 2000.

The band has also performed live on various TV and radio shows including Pebble Mill at One, the Tom O'Connor show, This Morning, TV-am, Kilroy, The Monkees TV Special, BBC Radio 1, Radio London, Piccadilly Radio, Radio Norfolk, Radio Cornwall, as well as on TV and radio stations throughout Europe.

A notable televised performance of the band was on March 9, 2003 on ITV's Saturday Night at the London Palladium where they backed Mike Berry, John Leyton, and Jet Harris, as well as giving their own instrumental performance.

== Discography ==
=== Albums ===
- Straight To The Point (1985, Off Beat), UK Indie No. 16.
- 1961 (1987, Big Beat Records, Off Beat).
- The Return Of The Rapiers (1991, Fury Records).
- You're Never Alone With The Rapiers (2000, Fury Records).
- Jimmy Jemain And The Rapiers - A Tribute To Cliff Richard And The Shadows (2014, InBeat Records).

=== Compilation albums ===
- The Rapiers Collection (1988, Twang).
- The Rapiers Collection Vol. 2 (1991, Twang).
- Back To The Point (1994, Fury Records).
- Los Rapiers (1995, Fury Records).
- Spotlight On The Rapiers - Best Of (2002, Fury Records).

=== Extended plays ===
- The Rapiers - Vol. 1. (1984, Red Door Records).
- The Rapiers Vol 2 (1984, Twang).
- The Rapiers Vol 3 (1985, Twang).
- The Rapiers Vol 4 (1986, Twang).
- The Return Of The Rapiers (1991, Fury Records).
- At The London Palladium (1995, Fury Records).
- Merry Christmas From Colin, Brad, John & Neil (1995, Twang).
- Fairground Twist (2011, Top Spin Records)

=== Singles ===
- "The Closing Theme" (1986, Off Beat).
- "On My Mind" / "Buckleshoe Stomp" (2000, Larsen Records).
- "Come On England" - John Leyton & The Rapiers (2002, Freddyboy Records).
- "No Other Baby" (Live) - Jet Harris & Billie Davis With The Rapiers (2006).
