= The Silhouets =

Belgian guitar instrumental band

The Silhouets are a guitar instrumental rock band from Belgium who also performed and recorded some songs with vocals and who are best known for their 1964 instrumental single "Geisha" which was certified Gold.

== History ==
=== Origins of the band ===
The band was founded by Robert Roekens whose first big musical influence was Elvis Presley. In 1958, Roekens was invited by Louis Fiers to perform with him on a farewell tour in Germany, where they performed in twenty-two different towns in twenty-two consecutive days. It was from this tour that Roekens earned the stage name, Bob Rocking. Roekens then recruited Michel Recoules and Sylvian van Holmen with whom he formed his first band, Bob Rocking & The Blue Boys. They performed concerts, including at Ostend Casino. They performed rock and roll music and tunes such as "This Magic Moment" by The Drifters. Michel Recoules and Sylvian van Holmen then left the band. Roekens then formed the first line up of The Silhouets with Robert Cogoi on bass guitar and a drummer named Hubert. This line up of the band lasted about eight months and they performed instrumental tunes by The John Barry Seven. Robert Cogoi then left the band by the end of 1960 and was replaced on bass by Armand Roelens. Michel Recoules who had left the band for service in the army was replaced on rhythm guitar by Jan Gaillaert. Hubert, the drummer also left and was replaced by Christiaan Depreter. This was the final line up of The Silhouets who soon became heavily infuenced by British instrumental band, The Shadows. The band performed for two months at a famous venue called Le Fiacre in Ostend in 1961. In 1962, the band were booked in to perform for two months in Iscinari in Westende and in 1963, they performed for three months in Venus in Ostend.

=== Geisha ===
In May 1964, the now completed line up of the band went to Decca Studios in Brussels to record their only single, "Geisha" / "The Little Feeling", which was released on Week-End Records. The instrumental Geisha was recorded in a similar style to that of The Shadows and was quite influential in that it inspired several other similar bands. It was later certified Gold in Belgium.

=== Later years and disbandment ===
The band continued until late 1966 when Armand Roelens left and was briefly replaced on bass by Karel Busco for the last four to five months. Roekens stated that by this time, instrumental bands like The Shadows were out of fashion and The Beatles were in so The Silhouets split up.

=== Reunions ===
In October 1993, the band reunited and performed at the Casino in Ostend which had an audience of hundreds of people. The same year, the band released a 24-track album, Shadows & Shades, which included a mix of vocal performances and instrumental tunes. In March 1997, the band performed at the Pipeline Instrumental Rock Convention in London. The band performed again at the Pipeline Instrumental Rock Convention in London in 2006, and in Hertfordshire in 2008.

== Discography ==
=== Singles ===
- "Geisha" / "The Little Feeling" (1964, Week-End Records 18012)

=== Albums ===
- Shadows & Shades (1993, CD, Rarity Records)
- The Sound Of The Silhouets Vol. 2 (1996, CD, Rarity Records)
- Then And Now (Best Of) (2002, CD).

=== Compilation albums ===
- Collector Items From Belgium Vol. 1 (1993, Rarity Records): "Geisha", "The Little Feeling".
- Twist And Frit (1996, Ariola / BMG): "Geisha".
