= The Robin Bibi Band =

English blues band

The Robin Bibi Band is an English blues band fronted by lead guitarist and vocalist, Robin Bibi. He has worked with Robert Plant, Jimmy Page, and Ben E. King, among others.

== History ==
Robin Bibi is a blues guitarist and vocalist who has collaborated with Jimmy Page, Ben E. King, Helen Shapiro, Robert Plant, and The Pretty Things.

In 2007, he headlined Pipeline magazine's annual international Instrumental Rock Convention in Bushey, Hertfordshire, England.

In June 2019, he performed at the Belfast City Blues Festival in Belfast, Ireland.

In December 2020, his song "In Too Deep" appeared on the compilation album, Bands That Rocked The Cavern, which was organised by Danny Hynes of NWOBHM band Weapon UK and which included music by bands who had performed at The Cavern Free House in Wimbledon, London.

In November 2022, he appeared on the Roadhouse blues album, 2000 Miles.

On May 25, 2023, he performed at the Eel Pie Club in Twickenham, London, England, in support of Paul Cox.

On September 3, 2023, he performed at the Oval Tavern in Croydon, London, England.

In October 2023, he performed at the 40th Swanage Blues Festival in Swanage, England.

In June 2024, he performed at the Stand Together Against Cancer: The Concerts For Matt Long, vocalist and guitarist of Catfish, in Luton, England.

In November 2024, he appeared on the Terry Marshall album, Living The Blues, on which he performed B. B. King's "Worried Dreams" with Laurence Jones.

On May 15, 2025, he performed at the annual Cyril Davies tribute concert at the Eel Pie Club, in Twickenham, London, England as part of the All-Stars.

On June 12, 2025, he headlined a blues festival in Leighton Buzzard, England.

In October 2026, the UK Blues Federation inducted Robin Bibi into the UK Blues Hall of Fame.

== Family ==
Robin Bibi is the father of DJ, Michael Bibi.

== Discography ==
=== Albums ===
- Atmosphere 26 - Enlightenment (1999, with Adrian Carson and Kirsty Hawkshaw, Music House)
- Language Of Your Soul (2001, BBCD)
- Live Therapy (2002, BBCD)
- A Tribute To Fast, Vol. 1 (2002, Tosh Records)
- No More A Secret (2016, Ashwood Records Ltd) (No. 2 on Independent Blues Broadcasters Association playlist chart)
- St Lawrence Blues (2019, with Alan Glen)
- Blue Thrash Therapy (BBCD Recordings)
- Switch On The Live (BBCD)
- Ambient Grooves (with Adrian Carson, Wonder Web Music)
- Spiritual Journey (with Martin York and Ed Spevock, Wonder Web Music)
- Fast Life Songs (BBCD Records)
