= The Charades (Finnish band) =

The Charades are a primarily guitar instrumental rock band, who have also recorded and performed some songs with vocals, from Finland who have gained critical acclaim world-wide.

== History ==
The Charades have released many albums since the 1990s with most gaining attention internationally.

In 2005, The Charades were featured in a TV feature on MTV3.

In 2006, The Charades performed at Bruce Welch's Shadowmania concert. In 2007, they released the album, On Stage All Around The World.

The Charades performed live at Pipeline magazine's annual international Instrumental Rock Convention in the UK in 2002, 2004, 2007, and 2012, and won the magazine's award for Album of the Year in 2001, 2003, 2007, and 2010.

In 2012, The Charades re-released the album In Motion on Rautalanka Records which had previously been released in 2001 on Echo Records and had caused a critical stir because most guitar instrumental bands at the time were trying to copy the style of The Shadows, but The Charades were the first to convincingly recreate the sound of The Ventures and according to one review, even surpassed the originals in quality, thanks largely to the lead guitarist, Hannu Konnonen.

In 2014, they released the well-received album, All Around The World With....

On October 29, 2015, The Charades played live as one of the support acts for Nokie Edwards.

On July 28, 2023, The Charades performed at The Siren in Morro Bay, California. The same month the band also performed at the Surf Guitar 101 Festival in Long Beach, California.

== Members ==
The Charades have gone through many line up changes over the years including:

- Jari Moberg: drums (Chameleons)
- Oli Pihlajamaa: vocals (1989-1994)
- Hannu Kononen: lead guitar (-2007) (Chameleons)
- Arto Makela: lead guitar (2007-)
- Marko Rahikainen: guitar (before Sami Wuorea)
- Sami Wuori: guitar (after Marko Rahikaisen)
- Toni Liimatta: guitar (2010-)
- Samu Leminen: guitar (2014-)
- Markku Tuominen: bass guitar
- Tommi Salo: bass guitar
- Joouko Kantola: bass guitar
- Leo Eerikanen: bass guitar
- Jukka Vaisanen: bass guitar (2005-)
- Cisse Hakkinen: vocals (1990)

== Discography ==
=== Studio albums ===
- Rock-Ola & Charades (1993, Snap Records)
- In Motion (2001, Echo Records)
- Supersonic Action! (2003, Echo Records)
- Cool Blast! (2004, Rytmi Records)
- On Stage (2006, Power Records)
- Wild Cards (2008, Power Records)
- All Around The World With The Charades (2014, GTJ Records)
- Lost Tapes '66 (2016, GTJ Records)
- We Like To Do That! (2024, GTJ Records)

=== Compilation albums ===
- Rautalanka Collection (2005, Power Records)
- Pops In Japan - 17 Groovy Instrumental Hits! (2005, Rytmi Records)
- As Hot As Cool Can Be (2009, Power Records)

=== Extended plays ===
- Beat Goes On! (as The Charades & Rock Ola, 1991, Rautalanka Records)
- Sydan Paholaisen (as The Charades & Rock Ola, 1993, Snap Records)
- Plays Exciting Rock Instrumental Hits (2021, GTJ Records)

=== Singles ===
- "Soul Bossa Nova" / "Like A Virgin" (Rautalanka Records)
