= Viikate =

Finnish heavy metal band

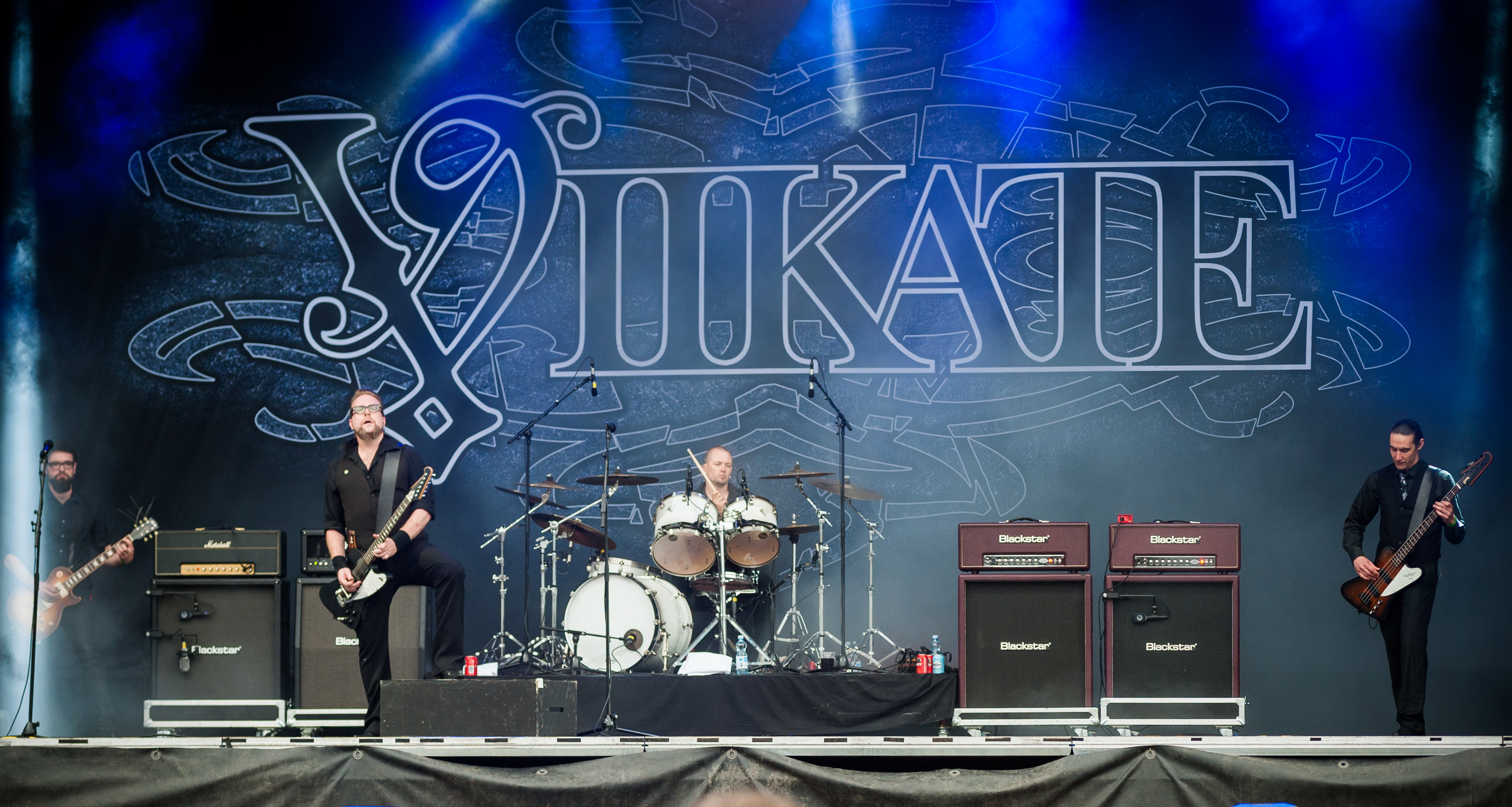
- Viikate at Ilosaarirock 2016

Background information
- Origin: Kouvola, Finland
- Genres: Heavy metal; folk rock; rautalanka
- Years active: 1996–present
- Labels: Ranka Recordings
- Members: Kaarle Viikate; Simeoni Viikate; Arvo Viikate; Ervo Viikate
- Website: viikate.com

Viikate ("Scythe" in English) is a Finnish heavy metal band from Kouvola, formed in 1996. The band is known for its melancholic lyrics, drawing inspiration from Finnish romance movies of the 1950s and Finnish singers of the era, including Reino Helismaa. Their style has been variously described as "Helismaa-metal", "wire metal", and "death schlagers".

The band began with Kaarle and Simeoni Viikate who remained the only members until 2001, when Arvo and Ervo joined. Viikate's most well-known hits are "Pohjoista viljaa" (Northern Crops), "Ei enkeleitä" (No Angels) and "Viina, Terva & Hauta" (Booze, Tar & The Grave). Kaarle and Simeoni got the idea of starting the band when watching Lyijykomppania's last concert.

== Members ==
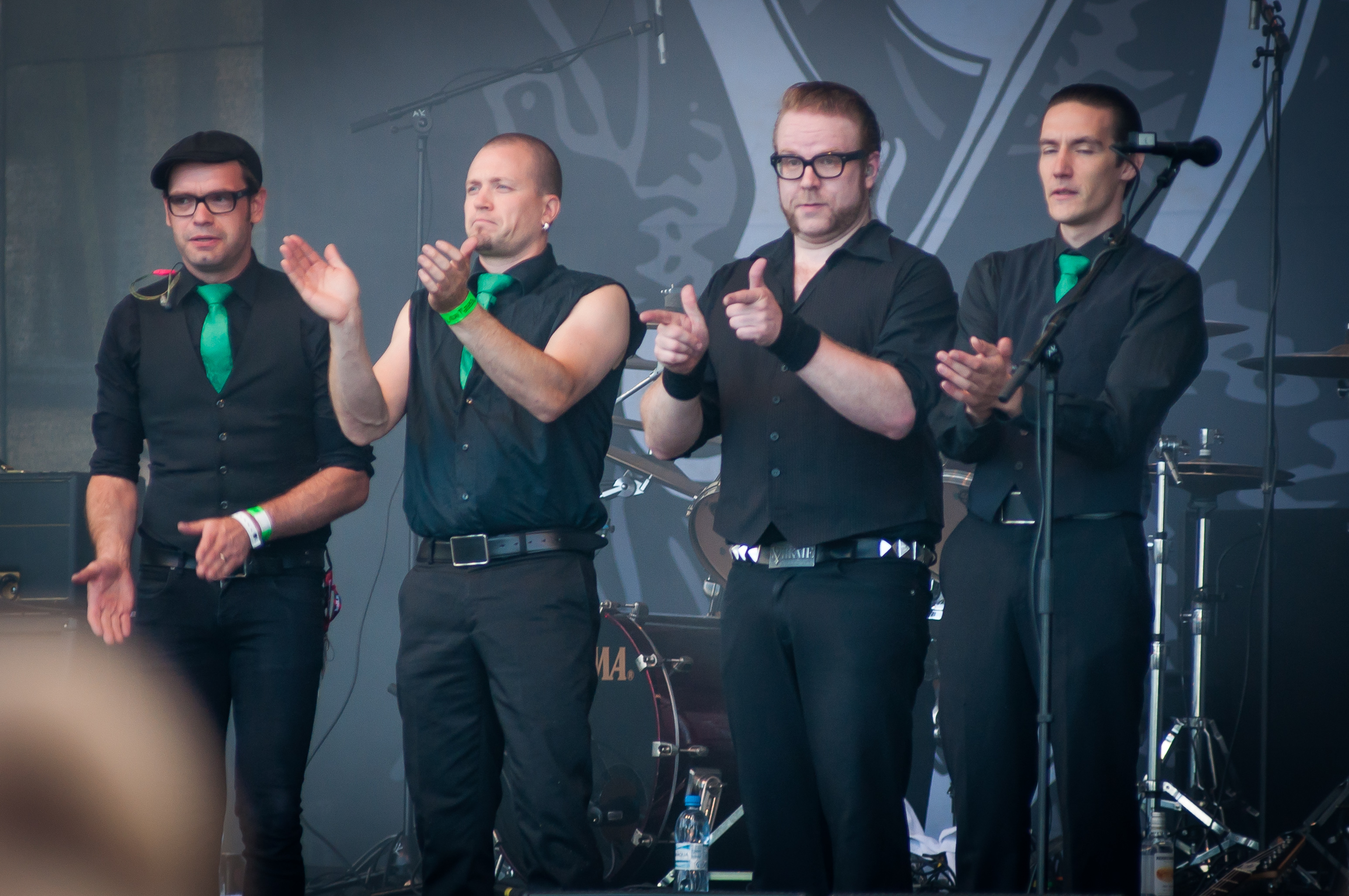
Viikate in 2013

- Kaarle Viikate (Kalle Virtanen) – vocals, guitar
- Simeoni Viikate (Simo Kairistola) – drums
- Arvo Viikate (Ari Taiminen) – guitar, vocals
- Ervo Viikate (Erkka Koskinen) – bass guitar, vocals

== Discography ==
=== Albums ===
- Noutajan valssi (Waltz of The Grim Reaper) (2000)
- Vuoden synkin juhla (The darkest party of the year) (2001)
- Kaajärven rannat (Beaches of The Kaa Lake) (2002)
- Surut pois ja kukka rintaan (Worries away and a flower to the chest) (2003)
- Unholan urut (The Organ Of Oblivion) (2005)
- Marraskuun lauluja I (November songs I) (2007)
- Marraskuun lauluja II (November Songs II) (2007)
- Kuu kaakon yllä (The Moon Over South-East)(2009)
- Petäjäveräjät (Pine Gates) (2012)
- Kymijoen lautturit (Ferrymen Of Kymijoki) (2013)
- Panosvyö (Bandoleer) (2014)
- XII – Kouvostomolli (XII – Kouvosto-Minor) (2016)
- Kuu Kaakon Yllä 10 Vuotta (The Moon Over South-East 10 Years) (2019)
- Rillumarei! (2020)
- Askel (Step) (2023)

=== EPs ===
- Vaiennut soitto (transl. 'Silenced Playing') (1998)
- Roudasta Rospuuttoon (transl. 'From Frost to Rasputitsa') (1999)
- Alakulotettuja tunnelmia (transl. 'Depressified Feelings') (2000)
- Valkea ja kuulas (transl. 'White and Translucent') (2001)
- Kevyesti keskellä päivää (transl. 'Lightly Amidst the Day') (2002)
- Iltatähden rusko (transl. 'Afterglow of the Evening Star') (2003)
- Kuolleen miehen kupletti (transl. 'Dead Man's Couplet') (2004)
- Kesävainaja (transl. 'Summercorpse') (2009)
- Linna Espanjassa (transl. 'Castle in Spain') (2010)

=== Singles ===
- Odotus (transl. 'The Wait') (2001)
- Piinaava hiljaisuus (transl. 'The Agonizing Silence') (1997, 2002) (record / remastered)
- Ei ole ketään kelle soittaa (transl. 'There's No One to Call') (2002)
- Nuori mies nimetön (transl. 'A Nameless Young Man') (2002)
- Kaunis kotkan käsi (transl. 'The Beautiful Hand of the Eagle') (2003)
- Leimu (transl. 'Flame') (2003)
- Pohjoista viljaa (transl. 'Northern Crops') (2005)
- Tie (transl. 'The Road') (2005)
- Vesi jota pelkäät (transl. 'The Water You're Afraid Of') (2005)
- Ah, ahtaita aikoja (transl. 'Ah, Tight Times')(2006)
- Ei enkeleitä (transl. 'No Angels') (2007)
- Me olemme myöhäiset (transl. 'We Are the Late') (2007)
- Orret (transl. 'The Roosts') (2007)
- Viina, terva ja hauta (transl. 'Booze, Tar and the Grave') (2009)
- Kuu kaakon yllä (transl. 'The Moon Above South-East') (2009)
- Hautajaissydän (transl. 'The Funeral Heart') featuring Topi Sorsakoski (2010)
- Sysiässä (transl. 'In the Autumn') (2012)
- Adventti (kappale) (transl. 'Advent Song') featuring Kotiteollisuus (2012)
- Oi pimeys (transl. 'O Darkness') (2013)
- Tervaskanto (transl. 'Tar Stump') (2013)
- Pelastus (transl. 'Salvation') (2015)
- Synkkä ventti (transl. 'Dark Blackjack') (2017)
- Tuulenhuuhtomat (transl. 'Windbreakers') (2018)
- Huomenta humalaiset (transl. 'Good Morning, Drunkards') (2020)
- Varjorastaat (transl. 'The Shadow Thrushes') (2020)
- Kavaljeeri (transl. 'Cavalier') (2022)
- Vapauden sillan alla (transl. 'Under the Freedom Bridge') (2022)
- Omakuva (karvalakki päässä) (transl. 'Self-Portrait, Wearing Hat') (2022)
- Älä pelkää pimeää (transl. 'Don't Fear the Dark') (2023)
- Kuin aaveet (transl. 'Like Ghosts') (2023)
