= Pipeline Instrumental Review =

- Pipeline Instrumental Review Autumn 2006 issue 72 featuring Roger Dean who was the lead guitarist of The Nu-Notes
- Editor: Alan Taylor and Dave Burke
- Frequency: Quarterly (1989–present)
- Publisher: Pipeline
- Founder: Alan Taylor and Dave Burke
- First issue: 1 January 1989
- Country: United Kingdom
- Based in: London
- Language: English
- Website: http://www.pipelinemag.co.uk/
- ISSN: 1470-8353

The Pipeline Instrumental Review, also known as Pipeline Magazine, is a British periodical magazine that focuses on instrumental rock music which was most popular in the 1950s and 1960s with bands and performers such as The Shadows, Duane Eddy, The Ventures, and The Spotnicks among many others. The title of the magazine comes from the 1963 surf rock instrumental hit, "Pipeline" by The Chantays. Although electric guitar instrumental music is the main focus of the magazine, it also publishes articles on other rock, R&B, jazz and country instrumental music from the 1950s to the present.

== Background ==
The Pipeline Instrumental Review was started by editors Alan Taylor and Dave Burke in 1989 after the discontinuation of several other magazines that covered the instrumental rock music scene and served as a replacement for fans of the genre.

== Coverage ==
The Pipeline Instrumental Review has been published quarterly since 1989 and edited by Alan Taylor and Dave Burke. It reviews the latest instrumental releases and others related to the genre. The magazine also features interviews with musicians and performers such as with Hank Marvin when he was on tour in 1997 for example. The first issue of the magazine featured a review of the latest compilation album by The Surfaris. The Tornados were featured in 1996 who were described by the magazine as "the only UK instrumental group to provide a serious chart challenge to The Shadows". The Lively Ones, whose tune "Surf Rider" was featured in Quentin Tarantino's 1994 film Pulp Fiction as well as on the soundtrack album, were also interviewed in 1997 and their discography was showcased, which was a regular part of Pipeline's features of the bands they interviewed. The Centurians' tune "Bullwinkle Part II" was also featured in Pulp Fiction and on the soundtrack album, and its 1995 re-release was reviewed by Pipeline magazine. The story of The Packabeats was featured in 1997 who provided the theme tune to the 1962 film, The Traitors. Bert Weedon was interviewed for issue 42 in 1999.

Although the initial print run of the magazine was only 200 copies, it soon sold out and had to be reprinted. The magazine soon became more popular and the print run was more than one thousand copies per issue with subscribers world-wide. As well as being subscription based, the magazine was also available at retail in places such as Midnight Records on East 23rd Street in Manhattan.

The Ventures, who having sold over 100 million, are the biggest selling instrumental band of all time, were given extensive coverage by Pipeline magazine from 1990 to 2009. Joe Moretti was interviewed by Pipeline magazine in 2002 and he gave details about the recording of the number 1 hit "Shakin' All Over" on which he played guitar for the band Johnny Kidd & the Pirates in 1960. In 1999, Canadian newspaper The Georgia Straight reported how unusual it was that Canadian band The Falcons beat the genre's two biggest bands, The Ventures and The Shadows, to win the Pipeline magazine award for best album of the year in 1998. Several publications have cited Pipeline magazine as a source for a 1960 instrumental tune being named after the M1 motorway. Pipeline magazine has also been quoted as giving extensive coverage to Nero & the Gladiators such as how band leader Mike O'Neill went into the music business to avoid doing national service and how a tour lasting seven months in Italy gave him the experience of being a touring musician as well as being a recording artist and potentially being a popstar.

== Convention ==
Each year from 1993 to 2014 the magazine held the Pipeline Instrumental Rock Convention at venues in London and Hertfordshire. From 1995 onward the Conventions were filmed by Intec Services and made available commercially on VHS but from 2006 all, including from 1995 onward, were made available in superior quality on DVD. Sometimes the Duane Eddy Convention would take place on the same day and at the same venue as the Pipeline Instrumental Rock Convention.

Year	Venue	Headliners
1993	International Students House, London	Counterpoint, The Runaways, The Scorpions, Nero & the Gladiators.
1994	International Students House, London	Highway Patrol, The Rapiers, The Surf Rats, The Hunters.
1995	International Students House, London	The Falcons, The Fentones, The Moontrekkers, Nero & the Gladiators, "1961".
1996	International Students House, London	Sir Bald Diddley & His Wig-Outs, The Cougars, Local Heroes. (Note: Local Heroes included Clem Cattini of The Tornados and Cliff Hall and Alan Jones who were former members of The Shadows.)
1997	International Students House, London	The Scorpions, The Temebeats, The Silhouets, The Spacemen.
1998	International Students House, London	The Boys, The Vickings, Local Heroes with special guest Brian "Licorice" Locking.
1999	International Students House, London	Husky & The Sandmen, Pipeline '61, The Jaguars, Bert Weedon.
2000	International Students House, London	The Secrets, The Centurions, Nero & the Gladiators, The Falcons, The Hunters, The Rapiers.
2001	Conway Hall, London	The Secrets, The Reflections, The Moontrekkers, The UB Hank Guitar Club Band, The Invaders.
2002	Conway Hall, London	Los Jets, Lost 4 Words, Legend, The Charades, The Tornados.
2003	International Students House, London	The Goldfingers, (Note: The Spotnicks cover band.) The Classics, The Vibratos.
2004	International Students House, London	Lost 4 Words, Alan Jones & Friends, The Packabeats, "1961", The Charades.
2005	Conway Hall, London	Indra & Move It, Los Jets, Nono Sodoberg & Hot Wires, The Fentone IV, Bungleflint.
2006	International Students House, London	Bob Spalding, 3 Balls of Fire, George Tomsco, The Silhouets, The Flames, The Surfin' Gorillas, The Rapiers (1960s band).
2007	Met Police Sports Club, Bushey, Hertfordshire	Jimmy Torres, Brian "Licorice" Locking, The Charades, The Robin Bibi Band, The Scorpions, The Foot Tappers, The JB5.
2008	Met Police Sports Club, Bushey, Hertfordshire	The Stingrays, Los Jets, The Silhouets, The Runaways, Los Fantasticos.
2009	Met Police Sports Club, Bushey, Hertfordshire	Happy Daze, (Note: Happy Daze included Malcolm Lenny who was a member of The Packabeats.) Indra & Move It, The Foot Tappers, The Razorblades, The Secrets.
2010	Met Police Sports Club, Bushey, Hertfordshire	Apollo 11, The Vintage, The Shadowers, The Twang Gang, The Vicars of Twiddly.
2011	Met Police Sports Club, Bushey, Hertfordshire	Legend, The Flames, The Johnny Lundin Band, (Note: Johnny Lundin was a member of Lee Kings and also of Tom & Mick.) The Instro-Mentals, Los Kiosk Bears.
2012	Met Police Sports Club, Bushey, Hertfordshire	Shazam, The Charades, The Reverb Syndicate, The Shadders, The Tone Raiders.
2013	Met Police Sports Club, Bushey, Hertfordshire	Bob Spalding with Counterpoint, The Dangermen, The Silver Shadows, The Crickettes, The Stingrays.
2014	Met Police Sports Club, Bushey, Hertfordshire	The Jumping Jewels Revival Band with original lead guitarist Hans van Eijk, Los Ventures, Joeland Plus, The Niteshades, Link Grey & The Dark Country.

== See also ==
- Shadowmania
- List of rock instrumentals
- List of instrumental number ones on the UK singles chart
- List of instrumental bands
