= Rautalanka =

Finnish style of instrumental rock

Rautalanka is a style of rock music that emerged in Finland in the 1960s, though the term is also used to refer to instrumental rock in general. The term translates literally as "iron wire", referring to the strings of the electric guitar.

Rautalanka is typically played by a quartet consisting of a lead guitar, rhythm guitar, bass guitar and drum kit, but can also include other instruments and vocals. The heyday of rautalanka was in the early 1960s, but it has enthusiasts until the present day. Typical features of rautalanka are sharp and clear melodies, fast tempos and extensive use of tape echo, but little or no overdrive or distortion. The twist-beat is a typical rhythm used. Melodies tend to be in minor keys and melancholic, based on folk tunes and schlager songs.

== History ==
Rautalanka emerged in the early 1960s, as the first music by and for young people to receive mass distribution in Finland. Before rautalanka, music recording and live performing was monopolized by (often older) professional musicians. The Finnish national broadcasting company Yleisradio had a monopoly on radio in Finland and played little pop music, but foreign radio stations such as Radio Luxembourg were popular, and Finnish youth were inspired to set up bands playing guitar music, emulating bands such as The Shadows and The Ventures, whose song "Walk, Don't Run" was a hit in Finland and used by Yleisradio as their theme melody.

The first major rautalanka hit was "Emma" by The Sounds, which became symbolic of the style. The golden age of rautalanka in Finland lasted from early 1961 to late 1963, at which point the fashion shifted to merseybeat exemplified by The Beatles. While instrumental rock music was popular around Europe, the term rautalanka is used only in Finland, Sweden (taggtråd) and Norway (piggtråd). It refers to instrumental music which is more melodic and clean than rock music, but more rhythmic than folk music.

== Bands ==
- Viikate
- The Charades
- Marko Haavisto
- Danny and the Islanders
- Agents
- Laika & the Cosmonauts

== See also ==
- Surf music
- Beat music
