= The Reverb Syndicate =

The Reverb Syndicate is an almost exclusively instrumental "Spy-Fi" surf band from Ottawa, Ontario, Canada who have been playing since 2006. Their music is of "soundtracks to 1960s spy films that don’t exist". They toured England and Scotland in 2008 and again in 2012, and have played at the 2007 and 2010 Ottawa Bluesfest. They have released four studio albums; Operation: Jet Set! (2006), Sputnik A-Go-Go (2007), Mondo Cacti (2011) and Odyssey (2015).

The band created and performed in a radio drama on the Canadian campus radio station CKCU in 2006, and have had two interviews on CBC Radio One (September 21, 2006 - and a 10-minute interview on November 21, 2007).

"The Reverb Syndicate is an Ottawa band that is taking on sinister government plots using a series of high-tech gadgets, a way with the ladies, and some seriously fast automotives. [They sound like] a bunch of surfers jumped James Bond in an alley." - CBC Radio One (Alan Neal)

Bassist Jeff Welch has played with Suburban Pop Project and Fan Belt Seven. Each band member plays a fictional spy character on stage:

- Mike Bradford (aka Agent Vic 20) – lead guitar, Theremin
- Jeff Welch (aka Agent Ampeg) – bass
- James Rossiter (aka Agent Sovtek) – rhythm guitar, keys
- Mike Rifkin (aka X) - Drums (2006–2011)
- Michael Sheridan (aka Felix Wainscotting) – drums

The band have also played shows across Canada and, on one occasion, as part of the line-up in a surf rock showcase in New York City.

In 2012, the band performed at the Pipeline Instrumental Convention in the UK.

== Track list ==
Operation: Jet Set! (2006)

1. "Theme To "Operation: Jet Set!""
2. "I Am The New Number Two"
3. "Oil Slicks And Ejector Seats"
4. "On To Checkpoint Bravo"
5. "Shake Don't Stir"
6. "The Code Is ********"
7. "I Am Not A Pleasure Unit"
8. "Zis Is KAOS!"
9. "M's Lament"
10. "Inlet Of Dire Consequences"
11. "...And The Hero Gets The Girl"

Sputnik A-Go-Go (2007)

1. "This Is Not A Test"
2. "Lunar Attack!"
3. "Sputnik A-Go-Go"
4. "Bolshevik Boogie"
5. "The Martini Cluster"
6. "The Lonely Henchman"
7. "La Balada de Senor Esquivel"
8. "Escape From The Village"
9. "Belka & Strelka's Big Adventure"
10. "Theremania!"
11. "Trans-Siberian Sunset"

Mondo Cacti (2011)

1. "A Shadow Descends On A Dusty Town"
2. "Theme To Mondo Cacti"
3. "Return Of The Angry Gentlemen"
4. "The Unsophisticated Señor"
5. "Guadalupe's Lab"
6. "Wandering Man"
7. "A Plethora Of Piñatas"
8. "Mondo Cacti (reprise)"
9. "Worse Things Happen At Sea"
10. "The 7 Habits Of Highly Effective Gunfighters"
11. "Los Alamos Breeze"
12. "Estruendo En El Rancho"
13. "Six Shooter Shuffle"
14. "Mud Puddles And Abandoned Saddles"
15. "Last Train To Death Valley Junction"
16. "Tequila Canyon / El Gran Final"

Odyssey (2015)

1. "A Typical Beginning"
2. "Hello World"
3. "Repeat Alpha Bravo"
4. "Kernel Panic in E Minor"
5. "The Good Intentions of Professor Atombender"
6. "Better Dancing Through Technology"
7. "Guru Meditation"
8. "Malicious Compliance"
9. "Impossible Intermission"
10. "The Henchman's New Twist"
11. "A Little Too Relaxed"
12. "A Brave Face Against Insurmountable Odds"
13. "Beyond the Infinite Loop"
14. "Mud Puddles And Abandoned Saddles"
15. "Division by Zero"
