= The Falcons (Canadian band) =

The Falcons are an instrumental rock band from Vancouver, Canada.

== History ==
The band's name comes from guitarist Mike Beddoes' Falcon model guitar amplifier that was made by Fender.

In 1992, the tune "Shadow Land" from their self-titled EP charted in the Top Ten across Canadian campus radio.

In 1995, the band performed with The Fentones at the Pipeline Instrumental Rock Convention in London. The same year they performed at the 60th birthday party for Nokie Edwards, the guitarist of instrumental group The Ventures.

In 1998, the Falcons' album Queen of Diamonds was chosen as the best album of the year by Pipeline Instrumental Review, beating the latest albums by The Ventures and The Shadows. Nokie Edwards from The Ventures made a guest appearance on the album.

The Falcons performed at the Pipeline Instrumental Rock Convention again in 2000.

Steve Newton, writing for the The Georgia Straight, rated the band's album Atomic Guitar as one of the Top Ten albums of 2011. The album includes a version of the instrumental classic "Sleep Walk". It also charted on the Canadian campus radio charts as did the 10th anniversary release of their Rebel Jukebox album.

The band's 2011 release EP Collection includes a version of the instrumental classic "Apache".

The band have toured Canada, Europe, and Japan, and according to CICK-FM have helped to revive the instrumental rock genre world-wide.

Since 2004, the band has mostly been a recording band but does perform live occasionally.

== Members ==
- Mike Beddoes - lead guitar.
- Kim Clarke - rhythm guitar, later replaced by Michael O'Brien, Gary Crammer, Gary Schnepper, and then Scott McLeod.
- Andre DesLauriers - drums.
- Gord Kearney - bass.

== Discography ==
=== Albums ===
- Queen of Diamonds (1998).
- Rebel Jukebox (2001).
- Canadian Christmas (2004).
- Atomic Guitar (2010).
- EP Collection (2011).
- Live in London.

=== Extended plays ===
- The Falcons (1992).
- Fly By Night (1994).
- Canadian Christmas (1998).

=== Video albums ===
- Pipeline 1995 London Convention
- Nokie Edwards 60th Birthday
- Pipeline 2000 London Convention
