= Michael Bibi =

London based tech-house musician

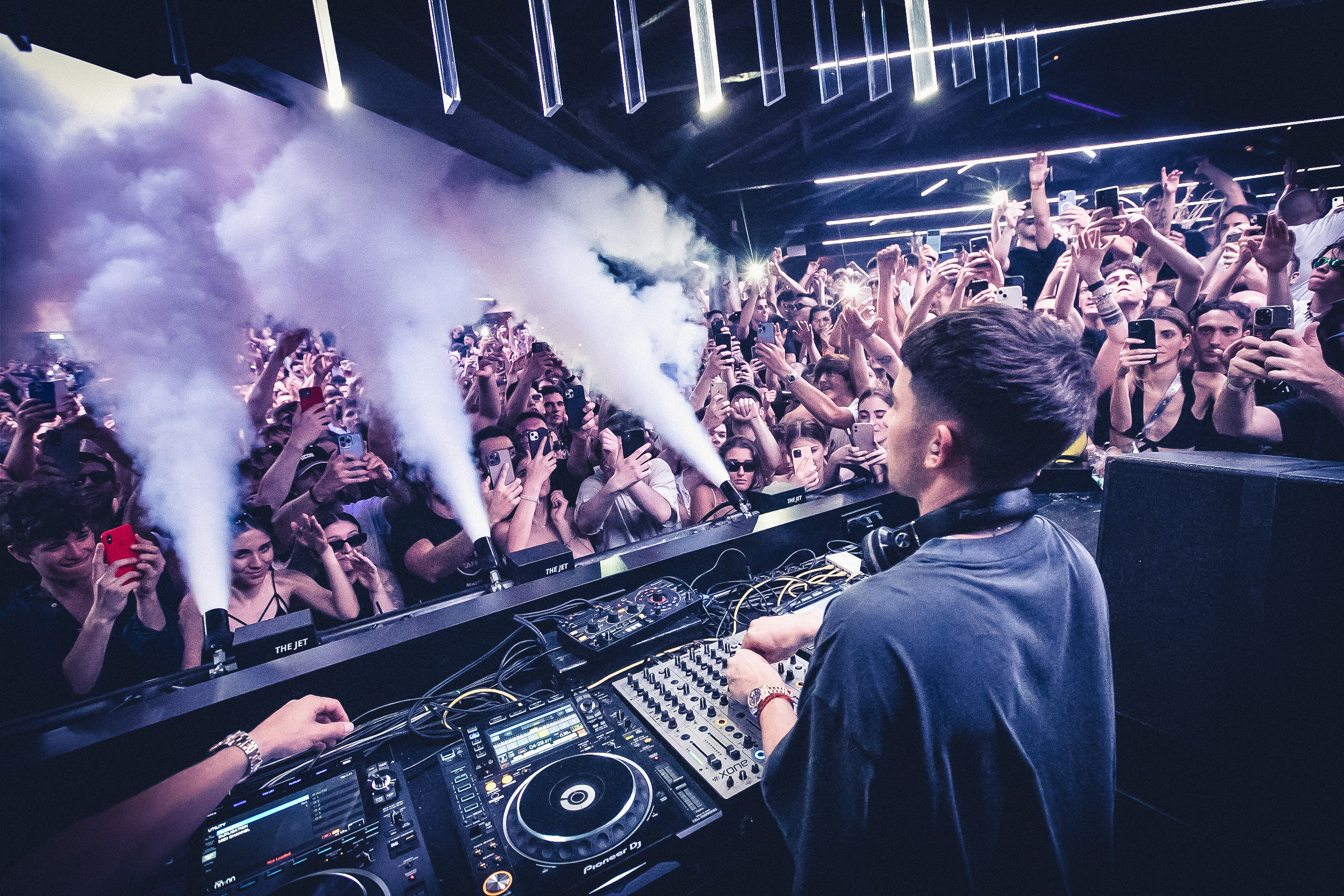
- Bibi in 2022

Background information
- Born: June 23, 1990 (age 36)
- Genre: tech-house
- Years active: 2011-present
- Label: Solid Grooves
- Website: www.michaelbibi.com

Michael James Lawrence Bibi (born 23 June 1990) is a British tech-house disc jockey and music producer, and co-founder of the Solid Grooves record label.

== Biography ==
Bibi grew up in London, England. His mother is a dance teacher, and his father the blues guitarist Robin Bibi. Following a period travelling he became a disc jockey in 2011. Struggling to enter the industry, he began his own parties under the Solid Grooves brand. The parties were a success and he was booked to perform across London.

In 2013, Bibi became acquainted with fellow DJ PAWSA, and in 2015 they together formed the Solid Grooves record label. At the time the tech-house music scene was becoming popular, and the new label tapped into this with its roster of artists at the vanguard. At the DJ Mag Best of British awards 2023, Solid Grooves won in the "Best Label" category.

In 2018 Bibi released the single "Hanging Tree", which featured a sample from the Hunger Games movie. The track was popular and went viral, which ended up putting him into the "superstar DJ" category. In 2020 Bibi was featured as the cover mix star for the April issue of the Mixmag magazine. In June the same year he performed on BBC Radio 1, delivering a 2-hour session for the Pete Tong Essential Mix show.

Bibi was diagnosed with cancer in 2023, which, following treatment, was in remission by December that same year. He returned to live performing in 2024, including hosting the "One Life" event at Finsbury Park. "One Life" was attended by 45,000 people and raised c. £120,000 for the Royal Marsden cancer charity. A collaboration with Alexa Sunshine Rose, "Sungazing", released in April 2025, was Bibi's first music release post-diagnosis.

=== Awards ===
Bibi won the "Best Tech House DJ" category at the 2019 DJ Awards. At the 2024 ceremony, he won the "Play it Back" award for his "One Life" campaign in aid of cancer charities.

== Discography ==
=== Charting singles ===
List of singles, with selected chart positions
Title	Year	Chart positions
Title	Year	UK downloads
"Hanging Tree"	2018	98
"Stargazing"	2025	59
"Mystery of Raw" (with Kettama and Wu-Tang)	2026	19

== See also ==
- List of club DJs
