= The Adventures of Stevie V =

British musical group

The Adventures of Stevie V was a British dance music act from Biggleswade, Bedfordshire, England. In the late 1980s and early 1990s, it scored several hits on the UK Singles Chart and the US Hot Dance Music/Club Play chart, most notably with the song "Dirty Cash (Money Talks)".

== History ==
Assembled by producer Steve Vincent (formerly of Brit-funk band Touchdown), the group consisted of Vincent, Mick Walsh and singer Melody Washington. Their most successful single was "Dirty Cash (Money Talks)", a 1990 dance hit that crossed over to pop radio and hit No. 2 on the UK Singles Chart, as well as peaking at No. 25 on the US Billboard Hot 100 in 1990. An album, Adventures of Stevie V followed, with a further two singles reaching the charts – "Body Language" reaching the UK Top 40, and "Jealousy" reaching both the UK and US charts.

Vincent released a second album, Satisfy Me in 1993, which featured a host of different singers, including soul divas Thelma Houston, Gwen Guthrie, Ruby Turner and Beverlei Brown and featuring the singles "Push 2 the Limit" and "Paradise".

== Discography ==
=== Albums ===
List of albums, with Australian chart positions
| Title | Album details | Peak chart positions |
| Title | Album details | AUS |
|---|---|---|
| Adventures of Stevie V | Released: 1990; Format: CD, LP, Cassette; Label: Mercury | 83 |
| Satisfy Me | Released: 1993; Format: CD; Label: WEA | - |

=== Singles ===
| Year | Single | Peak chart positions | | | | | | | | | | | | Album |
| Year | Single | UK | IRE | NED | BEL (FLA) | GER | AUT | SWI | AUS | NZ | US | US R&B | US Dance | Album |
|---|---|---|---|---|---|---|---|---|---|---|---|---|---|---|
| 1990 | "Dirty Cash (Money Talks)" | 2 | 10 | 1 | 3 | 20 | 13 | 16 | 18 | 34 | 25 | 75 | 1 | Adventures of Stevie V |
| 1990 | "Body Language" | 29 | 23 | 14 | — | — | — | — | 108 | 40 | — | — | — | Adventures of Stevie V |
| 1991 | "Jealousy" | 58 | — | — | — | — | — | — | — | — | 94 | — | 2 | Adventures of Stevie V |
| 1991 | "That's the Way It Is" | — | — | — | — | — | — | — | — | — | — | — | — | Adventures of Stevie V |
| 1993 | "Push 2 the Limit" | — | — | — | — | — | — | — | — | — | — | — | — | Satisfy Me |
| 1994 | "Paradise" | — | — | — | — | — | — | — | — | — | — | — | — | Satisfy Me |
| 1997 | "Dirty Cash (Money Talks) '97" (remix) | 69 | — | — | — | — | — | — | — | — | — | — | — | Single only |
"—" denotes releases that did not chart or were not released.

== See also ==
- List of Number 1 Dance Hits (United States)
- List of artists who reached number one on the US Dance chart
