= Pink Peg Slax =

English rockabilly band

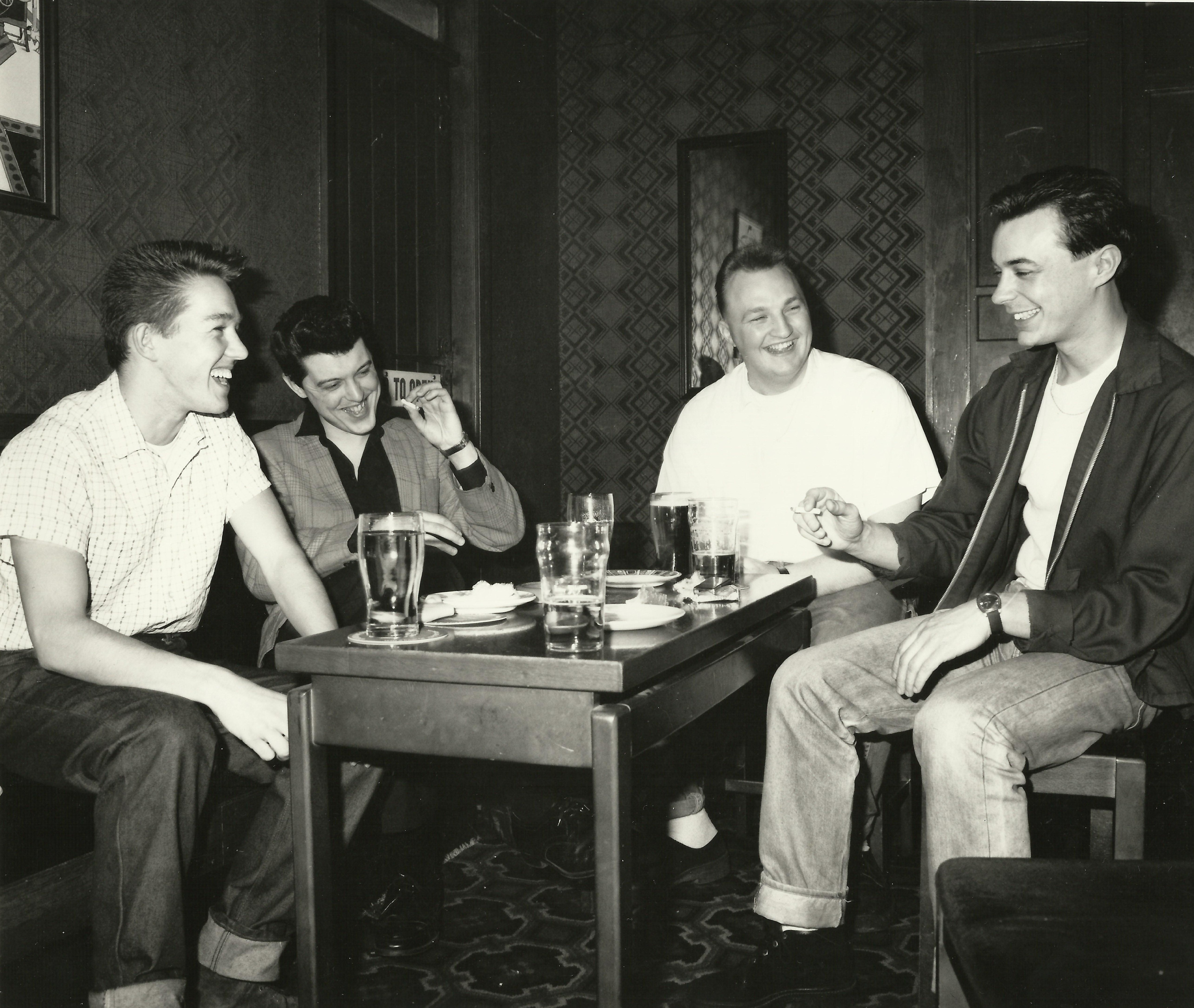
Pink Peg Slax from left to right: Martin Lefou, Vince Berkeley, Abner Cavanagh, Chet Taylor

Pink Peg Slax, often abbreviated to simply the Slax, were an English rockabilly band from Leeds who were prominent on the UK indie scene in the 1980s. One journalist famously remarked "If Elvis had been a Marx Brother, he would have created Pink Peg Slax". The band were also favourites of radio DJ, John Peel.

== Background ==
The band were part of the 1980s Leeds music scene, and their background was punk. Members of Pink Peg Slax had previously been in The Mekons, The Sisters of Mercy, and Gang of Four. The band recorded four sessions for BBC Radio 1, including for John Peel, and Andy Kershaw. Three of the band's singles and two of their albums received 5-star reviews in NME.

== History ==
In September 1983, Pink Peg Slax performed at the Futurama Festival which took place at Queens Hall, Leeds. In February 1984, Pink Peg Slax headlined the John Peel Roadshow in Leeds which was in aid of Ethiopia. On June 23, 1984, the band recorded their first Peel session and on April 16, 1985, they recorded their second Peel session. Pink Peg Slax's 1986 album, Belting Out A Tuna was a hit on the UK indie scene and its liner notes were written by Keith Floyd. Reviewing the album for NME, Stuart Jeffries stated that "Popular music is riven with references to food. Only rarely does this orgy of eating give way to songs about lesser matters - the purgatory of holidays in bad company and the superiority of Leeds above everything".

The band regularly performed live at the Leeds Warehouse concert venue. They also performed at the University of Leeds Refectory in 1986 and 1989. In a review of the band's 1986 EP, The Sound Of The Meanwood Valley, David Stubbs, writing for Melody Maker, stated that "Following in the slipstream of fellow Northerners The Mekons and Sally Timms and their humorous fetish for them thar hills [the song] "Wally Can You Hear Me" gallops, Lone Ranger-like through a memory of "Johnny Remember Me", bringing a little tear to my eye".

Jack O'Neill, writing for NME, rated the band's 1987 album, 12 Songs Never Recorded By Frank Sinatra, 8 out of 10 and said that "Ignore the ridiculous cabaret names of both the band and record. Bypass the cover drawing where the pink-faced Slax orbit round Sinatra because [the song] "Suddenly I Feel I'm Getting Old" rewarded these ears with more wit and worth than anything else this winter. It's a big, roomy, stomping honky-tonk full of humour and regret with spot-on piano and fiddle".

Frontman Mark Wilson, stage name Vince Berkeley, went on to perform as a solo artist, notably he headlined Guitar Fest '96 at Worcester's Huntingdon Hall.

In 2013, the band performed live as part of the concerts held in Preston, Lancashire which commemorated the anniversary of the death of John Peel.

In 2023, their song "Boy From Leeds" appeared on the compilation album Where Were You? which was compiled from songs by bands from Leeds from 1978 to 1989.

== TV appearances ==
The band performed on an episode of Channel 4's The Tube. They also appeared in an episode of the TV series Floyd on France in 1987.

== Legacy ==
Journalist James Brown made a quote about the band when reviewing their 1986 The Sound Of The Meanwood Valley EP that has persisted over the years that "If Elvis had been a Marx Brother, he would have created Pink Peg Slax".

== Members ==
- Mark Wilson, stage name Vince Berkeley: vocals, guitar.
- Chet Taylor: bass.
- Abner Cavanagh: drums.
- Martin Lefou: fiddle, piano.
- Pete Barker: lead guitar.
- Frankie Wilson: double bass.
- Mike Hirst: accordion
- Ade & Wink: backing vocals.
- Clive Webb, stage name Colin Moderne: acoustic guitar, piano.

== Discography ==
=== Studio albums ===
Year	Album	Record label	Chart Positions	
Year	Album	Record label	UK MM Indie	UK NME Indie
1986	Belting Out A Tuna	Half-Cut Records via Red Rhino Records	18	19
1987	12 Songs Never Recorded By Frank Sinatra	Ediesta	20	24

=== Compilation albums ===
Year	Album	Record label
2012	Rock-A-Beery Boogie: The Very Best of Pink Peg Slax	Raucous Records

=== Extended plays ===
Year	Extended play	Record label	Chart Positions
Year	Extended play	Record label	UK Indie
1986	The Sound Of The Meanwood Valley	Half-Cut Records via Red Rhino Records	10
2022	Evil, Evil, Evil, Nice, Nice, Nice	Half-Cut Records	-

=== Singles ===
Year	Single	Record label	Chart Positions
Year	Single	Record label	UK MM Indie
1984	"Dripping (My Love For You)"	Batfish Incorporated	3
1984	"Self-Pitying Stan"	Half-Cut Records via Red Rhino Records	12
