= Dennis Cruz =

Spanish DJ and record producer (born 1983)

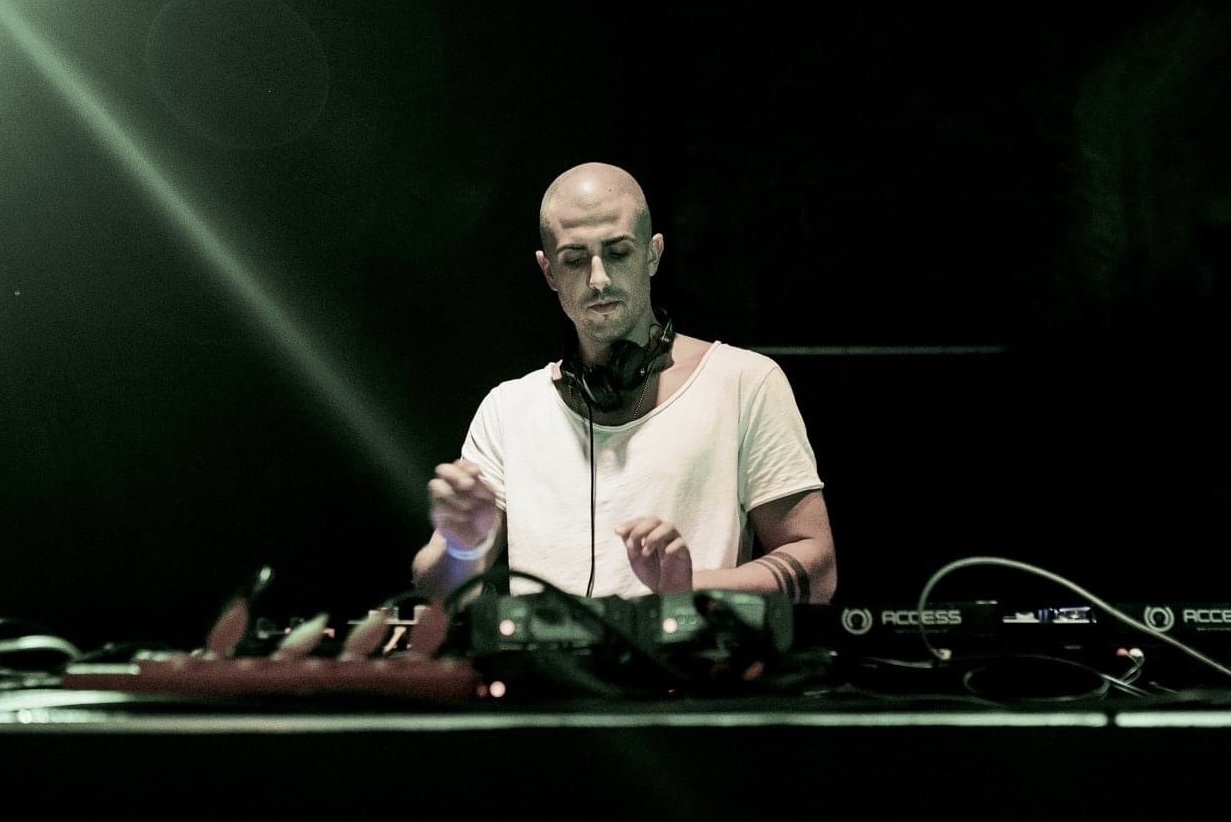
- Cruz in November 2017

Background information
- Birth name: Denis de Galdo Troyano
- Born: 28 March 1983 (age 42); Madrid, Spain
- Genres: Tech house; techno
- Occupations: DJ; Record producer

Denis de Galdo Troyano (born 28 March 1983), known professionally as Dennis Cruz, is a Spanish DJ and record producer, known for his style in genres such as tech house and techno, with influences from funk, dub and Latin music. He began producing in 2010 and has collaborated with prominent labels such as Saved, Deeperfect and Moon Harbour, in addition to creating several record labels Lemon-Aid Music and MÜSE. He is the co-founder of Loud Creative Agency, an artist representation agency.

== Biography ==
Denis de Galdo Troyano was born in Madrid, Spain, on 28 March 1983. Cruz started DJing as a hobby at the age of 17. One of his greatest influences has been Oscar Mulero, as he used to attend his sets in the capital, as well as Michael Jackson. He studied sound engineering and began his career in music working in recording studios with artists from different genres such as hip hop and rock bands. Cruz has received support from leading names in the electronic music community and has appeared in DJ Mag’s Top Tech House Artists. He was also named Best Artist at the Vicious Music Awards in Spain.

Cruz is one half of the group GOLFOS with British producer PAWSA, which they launched in the early 2020s. Under this alias, the duo performs back-to-back sets that blend minimal tech-house with jazzy samples and funk influences. The name Golfos is Spanish slang for “troublemakers” or “party animals," reflecting the playful and underground nature of the project. Golfos have played at major festivals such as:

- Kappa Futur Festival (Turin, 2023)
- Circoloco NYC (2024)
- GreenWorld Festival (Mappa) (Tenerife, 2024)

In 2024, he released Bonito under PAWSA's label Solid Grooves.

== Discography ==
Studio albums

- Roots (2021)
- Stikk (2024)

Singles and EPs

- Yoruba (2013)
- Fuck / La Tortilla (2014)
- LSD (2015)
- El Vacilón (2015)
- El Bongosero (2015)
- See Line (2016)
- Bad Behaviour (2016)
- Hydroponic (2016)
- Everybody (2016)
- Mad (2017)
- Play (2017)
- Funk You (2017)
- Rock & Roll (2017)
- Cookies (2017)
- Freaks (2018)
- My Hood (2018)
- Better Than Pussy, 2019
- Girls Like This [Summer Edit] (2019) - GOLF005
- Hole 9 [Birdie Mix] (2019) - GOLF007
- Show Me / Five (2020) - MUSE013
- Jenny is Dancing [Salsa Mix] (2020) - GOLF009
- Goldigger (2020) - MUSE018
- Uhuru (2020)
- KMA (2020)
- Ahora Todo Va (2021)
- Los Tamales (2021)
- What U Doing 2021
- Ready for the Blues (2022) - MUSE031
- Ready to Roll (2022) - MUSE037
- Llorarás [7am Mix] (2023)
- Get Tussi [Club Mix] (2023) - GOLF010
- Off the Hook [Nyc Edit] (2024) - GOLF011
- The Snake Charmer 2023
- Bonito (2024) - SGR086
- Fabulous (2025)
