= The Scorpions (London band) =

British instrumental band

The Scorpions were a British instrumental band who were active from the late 1950s to 1965. They are best known for their 1961 single, "Ghost Riders in the Sky". According to the music historian Colin Larkin, although the band only released two singles, their contribution to music is undervalued.

== History ==
=== Background ===
After the success of Lonnie Donegan, Ted Barber (born in Battersea, London) formed a skiffle group in 1956 in which he performed vocals and played guitar and which was known as The Penitentiary Five. This band included his cousin Terry Russell on vocals and washboard, Barry Eastwell on vocals and guitar, Ken Page on tea-chest bass, and Lee Brimfield on banjo. By 1957 they had changed musical direction and were playing rock 'n' roll with Ted's twelve-year old brother, John Barber, having replaced Brimfield on banjo. The band disbanded in 1958 having recorded the tracks "Streamline Train" and "Stack O' Lee Blues".

John Barber then became the guitarist and the brothers formed a new band with singer Mick LeDieu on vocals which was known as Little Ricky and The Scorpions. They were joined by Ivor Knight on drums who was previously in the band Half Moon Six and they recorded a 13-song album but LeDieu left and was replaced by vocalist Peter Rhodes who was also from Half Moon Six. However, the band soon became an instrumental band and recorded an eight-track album.

=== Ghost Riders in the Sky ===
In January 1961, the band recorded a version of "Ghost Riders in the Sky" for EMI but The Ramrods version had already become a hit in the US and UK. The release of The Scorpions' version was reported in the US by Cashbox magazine on February 18, 1961. It received regular airplay on Radio Luxembourg and at one point it was selling 1,500 copies per day but remained just outside of the UK Top 50 singles chart for quite some time. It sold 12,000 copies in total. The band was featured in the London newspaper South Western Star on March 10, 1961. A second single "Rockin' At The Phil" was released in May 1961 and along with its B-side "Scorpio" became regarded by aficionados of instrumental music as one of the triumphs of the genre because of how well they were performed. "Rockin' At The Phil" also received significant airplay. The band later recorded three tracks for Joe Meek at Holloway Road studio.

==== Notable live performances ====
In the late 1950s the band regularly played three nights a week at the Mission in York and also performed at the Battersea Jazz Club. On April 1, 1961, the band performed at the Chippenham Corn Exchange alongside The Brook Brothers. On May 13, 1961, the band were driven by chauffeur in a Rolls-Royce with Sam Kydd and Jack Hawkins to perform at the Battersea Star Gala. Also at that show was Kenneth More and Harry Secombe who the band also met.

=== TV and film appearances ===
Two members of the band The Outlaws, Billy Kuy and Reg Hawkins, briefly replaced Ted Barber and this line up of the band appeared in an episode of the TV comedy series The Likely Lads. During the episode the band performed an instrumental version of The Rolling Stones' song "The Last Time". Ted Barber returned but the band disbanded in 1965. The song "Scorpio" was later used in the film Absolute Beginners in 1986. Ted Barber and John Barber received royalties for the inclusion of the song in the film.

=== Reunions ===
Twenty-five years after the band had disbanded, they were invited to perform at the monthly gathering of the Joe Meek Appreciation Society. The band performed at the Pipeline Instrumental Rock Convention in London in 1993, and again in 1997 after their album Anthology 1959-1965 had been released in 1996 on CD. They performed again at the Pipeline Instrumental Convention ten years later in 2007.

== Discography ==
=== Singles ===
- "Ghost Riders in the Sky" / "Torquay" (March 1961, Parlophone).
- "Rockin' At The Phil" / "Scorpio" (May 1961, Parlophone).

=== Extended plays ===
- Back To The Tracks (1993, Sting In The Tail Records).

=== Albums ===
- Anthology 1959-1965 (1996, Wooden Hill).
- All The Instrumentals (2008, Stylus Music).

=== Compilation albums ===
- Shadow Records Vol. 1 - 16 Great Instrumentals (1979, Shadow Records): "Riders in the Sky", "Torquay".
- Instrumental Gems 1959–1970 (1979, EMI): "Riders in the Sky".
- 20 Classic Instrumental Rarities (1985, See for Miles Records): "Scorpio", "Rockin' At The Phil".
- Instrumental Greats of the 60's (1990, EMI): "Scorpio".
- Jumpin - Instrumental Diamonds Vol . 1 (1991, Sequel Records): "Riders in the Sky".
- Legends of Rock 'n' Roll (1992, EMI): "Riders in the Sky".
- Rock 'n' Roll Instrumentals (1992, EMI): "Riders in the Sky".

In Record Collector's Rare Record Price Guide 2020, The Scorpions' singles, if in "mint" condition, were valued at £20 for "(Ghost) Riders in the Sky" / "Torquay", £20 for "Rockin' At The Phil" / "Scorpio", and £12 for the EP, Back To The Tracks.

== See also ==
- The Packabeats
- The Cougars
