= Johnny Hallyday discography =

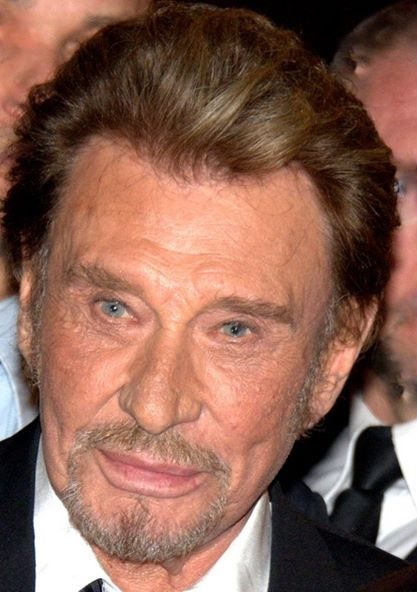
Johnny Hallyday

This is the discography of French rock and roll singer Johnny Hallyday.

== Studio and live albums ==
Year	Album	Peak positions			Sales	Certifications
Year	Album	FR	BEL (Wa)	SWI	Sales	Certifications
1961	Nous les gars, nous les filles	25				
1961	Salut les copains	20				
1962	Sings America's Rockin' Hits	20				
1962	Johnny à l'Olympia (Olympia 62)	–				
1963	Les Bras en croix	45				
1964	Johnny Hallyday Olympia 64	55				
1964	Johnny, reviens ! Les Rocks les plus terribles	31				
1965	Hallelujah	39				
1965	Johnny chante Hallyday	–				
1966	La Génération perdue	18	19	97		
1967	Olympia 67	15				
1967	Johnny 67	15				
1967	Johnny au Palais des sports	–				
1968	Jeune homme	1				
1968	Rêve et amour	1				
1969	Rivière... ouvre ton lit (aka Je suis né dans la rue)	1				
1969	Que je t'aime – Palais des congres 69	1			FRA: 1,100,000	
1970	Vie	2				
1971	Flagrant délit	1			FRA: 200,000	
1971	Live at the Palais des sports (Palais des Sports 1971)	–			FRA: 200,000	
1972	Country, Folk, Rock	2			FRA: 100,000	
1973	Insolitudes	1			FRA: 200,000	SNEP: Gold
1974	Je t'aime, je t'aime, je t'aime	1			FRA: 150,000	
1974	Rock'n'Slow	2			FRA: 250,000	SNEP: Gold
1975	Rock à Memphis	1			FRA: 250,000	
1975	La Terre promise	1			FRA: 200,000	
1976	Derrière l'amour	1			FRA: 300,000	SNEP: Gold
1976	Palais Des Sports 76 - Hallyday Story	–				SNEP: Platinum
1976	Johnny Hallyday Story - Palais des sports	–			FRA: 300,000	
1976	Hamlet	5			FRA: 200,000	SNEP: Gold
1976	Succès 2 Disques - Les coups				FRA: 200,000	
1977	C'est la vie	5			FRA: 400,000	SNEP: Platinum
1977	Réimpression				FRA: 100,000	
1978	Solitudes à deux	1			FRA: 300,000	SNEP: Platinum
1979	Hollywood	2			FRA: 300,000	SNEP: Gold
1979	Pavillon de Paris: Porte de Pantin	2			FRA: 400,000	SNEP: Platinum
1979	Album d'Or - Retiens la nuit	2			FRA: 100,000	
1979	Succès 2 Disques - Ceux que l'amour a blessés	2			FRA: 100,000	
1980	À partir de maintenant	7			FRA: 250,000	SNEP: Gold
1981	En pièces détachées	2				SNEP: Gold
1981	Live	2				
1981	Pas facile	2				
1982	Quelque part un aigle	3				SNEP: Gold
1982	La Peur	2				SNEP: Platinum
1982	Palais Des Sports 82	4				SNEP: Gold
1983	Entre violence et violon	3				SNEP: Gold
1983	En V.O.	–				
1984	Hallyday 84: Nashville en Direct	3				SNEP: Gold
1984	Drôle de métier	–				
1984	Spécial Enfants du Rock	–				
1984	Johnny Hallyday au Zénith	2				
1985	Rock'n'Roll Attitude	2			FRA: 600,000	SNEP: Platinum
1986	Gang	5				SNEP: 2× Platinum
1988	Johnny à Bercy	1				SNEP: Platinum
1988	Live at Montreux	1	1	4		
1989	Cadillac	1			FRA: 600,000	SNEP: 2× Platinum
1991	Ça ne change pas un homme	3				
1993	Bercy 92	2			FRA: 250,000	SNEP: 2× Gold
1993	Parc des Princes 1993	1		97		SNEP: Platinum
1994	Rough Town	1	4	5		SNEP: Gold
1994	À La Cigale (live 1994)	–				
1995	Lorada	2	3	–		SNEP: 2× Platinum
1996	Lorada Tour	1	6	–		SNEP: Platinum
1996	Destination Vegas	4	16	–		
1996	Live at the Aladdin Theatre (Las Vegas 1996)	–	–	–		
1998	Ce que je sais	2	2	38		SNEP: 2× Platinum; SWI: Gold
1998	Stade de France 98 Johnny allume le feu	2	9	–		
1999	Sang pour sang	1	1	47	FRA: 1,850,000	SNEP: Diamond; SWI: Platinum
2000	100 % Johnny : Live à la Tour Eiffel	1	1	12	FRA: 600,000	SNEP: Platinum
2000	Olympia 2000	8	39	82		SNEP: Gold
2002	À la vie, à la mort !	1	1	2	FRA: 1,050,000	SNEP: Diamond; BEL: Platinum; SWI: Platinum
2003	Parc des Princes 2003	1	5	40		SNEP: 2× Gold
2005	Ma Vérité	1	1	5	FRA: 750,000; WW: 800,000	SNEP: 2× Platinum; BEL: Gold; SWI: Gold
2006	Flashback Tour: Palais des sports 2006	1	1	9		SNEP: Platinum
2007	La Cigale : 12-17 décembre 2006	1	9	29		
2007	Le Cœur d'un homme	1	1	4	FRA: 490,000	SNEP: 2× Platinum; BEL: Gold
2008	Ça ne finira jamais	1	1	4	FRA: 430,000	SNEP: 2× Platinum; BEL: Gold
2009	Tour 66 : stade de France 2009	1	1	25		SNEP: 3× Platinum
2011	Jamais seul	1	1	3	FRA: 200,000	SNEP: 3× Platinum; BEL: Gold
2012	L'attente	1	1	–	FRA: 460,000	SNEP: Diamond; BEL: Gold
2013	On Stage	3	2	25		SNEP: Platinum
2013	Born Rocker Tour	1				SNEP: Gold
2014	Rester vivant	1	1	5	FRA: 490,000	SNEP: Diamond; BEL: Gold; SWI: Gold
2015	De l'amour	1	1	4	FRA: 390,000; WW: 400,000	SNEP: 3× Platinum; BEL: Gold; SWI: Gold
2016	Rester vivant tour	3	3	16		SNEP: Platinum

=== Posthumous albums ===
Year	Album	Peak positions				Sales	Certifications
Year	Album	FR	BEL (Fl)	BEL (Wa)	SWI	Sales	Certifications
2018	Mon pays c'est l'amour	1	8	1	1	WW: 1,700,000; FRA: 1,500,000	SNEP: 3× Diamond; BEL: Platinum
2019	Que je t'aime	—	—	37	—		
2019	Johnny	1	42	1	2	FRA: 433,656	SNEP: 3× Platinum
2019	Les vieilles canailles: L'album live (with Jacques Dutronc and Eddy Mitchell)	1	76	1	4	FRA: 146,000+	SNEP: Platinum
2020	Johnny 69	7	—	—	—		
2020	Happy Birthday Live	1	—	4	54		
2020	Son rêve américain	1	113	1	5		
2021	L'histoire continue... Acte II	1	82	1	12		
2021	Mon nom est Johnny	—	187	5	38		
2023	Made in Rock 'n' Roll	6	—	1	32		
2023	Johnny Hallyday Symphonique	6	—	—	43		SNEP: Gold

=== 33 rpm, 10" (1960–1964) ===
Year	Album	Peak positions
Year	Album	FR
1960	Hello Johnny	58
1961	Johnny Hallyday et ses fans au festival de Rock'n'Roll	–
1961	Tête à tête avec Johnny Hallyday	64
1961	Viens danser le twist	10
1962	Retiens la nuit	10
1962	Madison Twist	10
1963	L'Idole des jeunes	48
1963	Da dou ron ron	56
1963	D'où viens-tu Johnny?	43
1964	Les guitares jouent	80
1964	Le pénitencier	52

=== Live ===
Year	Album	Peak positions	Certifications
Year	Album	FR	Certifications
1981	Johnny Live 81 - Enregistrement Public		SNEP: Gold
1984	Live Au Zénith		SNEP: Gold
2010	Les Concerts Mythiques De L'Olympia - Juillet 2012 (Téle 7 Jours)		SNEP: Platinum

=== Unreleased live ===
- 2011: Johnny Hallyday 1960: À la Roche-Migennes (RDM Édition)
- 2011: Live à l'Olympia: 1965 / 1966 (Universal)
- 2012: Johnny Hallyday à l'Olympia (Vogue Olympia 1961)
- 2012: Live Grenoble 1968 (Universal)
- 2012: Live Olympia 1973 (Universal)
- 2012: Festival Mondial de Rock'n'Roll 1961

=== Albums in other languages ===
- 1976: In Italiano
- 1982: Black es noir

=== Compilations ===
Year	Title	Peak positions		Sales	Certifications
Year	Title	FR	BEL (Wa)	Sales	Certifications
1970	Dix ans de ma vie				
1971	Les 24 premiers succès			FRA: 150,000	
1972	Story Vol 1 1961-1966			FRA: 200,000	SNEP: Gold
1972	Story Vol 2 1967-1973			FRA: 150,000	SNEP: Gold
1975	Succès 2 Disques - Olympia 1962 et 1964			FRA: 100,000	SNEP: Gold
1976	Super Hits - Le pénitencier			FRA: 200,000	SNEP: Gold
1976	Super Hits - Retiens la nuit			FRA: 200,000	
1976	Le Disque d'Or Vol 4			FRA: 100,000	
1976	Le Double Disque d'Or			FRA: 75,000	
1976	24 Super Succès			FRA: 75,000	
1982	Le Cube (Box set, 40 33 rpm discs)				
1982	(premières chansons) Version 82	3			
1990	Nashville session 62				
1993	Collection Hallyday (Box set, 40 discs)				
1995	Master Série - Vol. 1 (Aimer Vivre)				SNEP: Platinum
1996	Paroles D'Hommes 'Rock 'N' Roll + Gang				SNEP: Platinum
1998	Master Série - Vol. 2 '(retiens La Nuit)				SNEP: 2× Gold
1999	Ballades				SNEP: Platinum
1999	Master Série - Vol. 1 & 2				SNEP: Gold
2003	Les 100 plus belles chansons	3	4		SNEP: Gold
2006	Les 100 plus belles chansons Vol.2	3	4		SNEP: Gold
2007	Go, Johnny, Go				
2009	Faces à faces				
2010	Le roi de France 1966-1969				
2010	Best of 70e anniversaire	8	8		
2011	La Collection Officiella: No1 Rock 'N' Roll Attitude				SNEP: Platinum
2011	La Collection Officielle: No2 Derriere L'amour				SNEP: Gold
2011	50 standards	26	29		
2012	History	69			
2012	Hit box	188			
2014	Salut les copains - Vol. 1 / 1960-1965	182			
2014	Salut les copains - Vol. 2 / 1966-1969	197			
2014	Double Best Of	178			
2014	Johnny History - Rhythm'n'Blues	151			
2014	Les Vieilles Canailles (joint with Jacques Dutronc and Eddy Mitchell)	9	21		
2014	2007-2012 Albums Studio Warner	138			
2014	Les 100 Plus Belles Chansons	157			
2015	Johnny chante en Italien et Espagnol	133			
2021	Les raretés Warner		9		

== Singles ==
Year	Title	Peak positions			Sales	Certifications
Year	Title	FR	BEL (Wa)	SWI	Sales	Certifications
1960	"T'aimer follement"	4		—		
1961	"Viens danser le twist"	1		—		
1962	"Retiens la nuit"	1		—		
1964	"Pour Moi La Vie"				FRA: 300,000	
1964	"Le pénitencier"	17	1	90	FRA: 300,000	
1964	"Excuse-moi partenaire"				FRA: 150,000	
1964	"Les mauvais garçons"				FRA: 150,000	
1964	"Dis-lui que j'en rêve"				FRA: 100,000	
1965	"Quand revient la nuit"				FRA: 150,000	
1965	"Johnny lui dit adieu"				FRA: 150,000	
1965	"Mes yeux sont fous"				FRA: 100,000	
1965	"Mon anneau d'or"				FRA: 100,000	
1966	"Cheveux Long, Idees Courtes"				FRA: 800,000	
1966	"Noir c'est noir"				FRA: 200,000	
1966	"Si j'étais un charpentier"				FRA: 150,000	
1966	"Mon anneau d'or"				FRA: 100,000	
1966	"Je l'aime"				FRA: 75,000	
1966	"Le diable me pardonne"				FRA: 75,000	
1967	"San Francisco"				FRA: 250,000	
1967	"Amour d'été"				FRA: 200,000	
1967	"Les chevaliers du ciel"				FRA: 100,000	
1967	"Hey Joe"				FRA: 100,000	
1967	"Petite fille"				FRA: 75,000	
1968	"Entre mes mains"				FRA: 200,000	
1968	"L'histoire de Bonnie and Clyde"				FRA: 150,000	
1968	"A tout casser"				FRA: 100,000	
1968	"Rivière ouvre ton lit"				FRA: 100,000	
1969	"Rivière ouvre ton lit"				FRA: 100,000	
1969	"Fumée"				FRA: 100,000	
1969	"Que je t'aime" (en concert au Palais des Congrès) live	1	1	35	FRA: 815,000	
1970	"Ceux que l'amour a blessés"			—	FRA: 300,000	
1970	"Deux amis pour un amour"			—	FRA: 250,000	
1970	"Jésus Christ"			—	FRA: 400,000	
1971	"Essayez"			—	FRA: 200,000	
1971	"Fils de personne"			—	FRA: 250,000	
1971	"Oh ma jolie Sarah"			—	FRA: 500,000	
1972	"Comme si je devais mourir demain"			—	FRA: 250,000	
1972	"J'en mettrais pas ma main au feu"			—	FRA: 100,000	
1972	"Rien n' vaut cett'fille là"			—	FRA: 100,000	
1972	"Avant - Tu peux partir si tu le veux"			—	FRA: 150,000	
1973	"J'ai un problème" (duet with Sylvie Vartan)				FRA: 700,000	SNEP: Gold
1973	"Comme un corbeau blanc"			—	FRA: 250,000	
1973	"Noël interdit"			—	FRA: 500,000	
1974	"Le feu"			—	FRA: 75,000	
1974	"Je t'aime, je t'aime, je t'aime"			—	FRA: 250,000	
1974	"Johnny Rider"			—	FRA: 200,000	
1974	"Prends ma vie"			—	FRA: 300,000	
1975	"A l'hôtel des cœurs brisés"			—	FRA: 100,000	
1975	"Hey lovely lady"			—	FRA: 400,000	
1975	"La terre promise"			—	FRA: 250,000	
1976	"Gabrielle"			—	FRA: 500,000	SNEP: Gold
1976	" Derrière l'amour "			—	FRA: 600,000	SNEP: Platinum
1976	"Requiem pour un fou"			—	FRA: 500,000	SNEP: Gold
1977	C'est la vie	5			FRA: 250,000	
1977	"Le Coeur En Deux"			—	FRA: 500,000	SNEP: Gold
1978	" Elle m'oublie"			—	FRA: 300,000	
1978	"Revoilà ma solitude"			—	FRA: 200,000	
1978	"J'ai Oublie De Vivre"			—	FRA: 500,000	SNEP: Gold
1979	"La fin du voyage"			—	FRA: 250,000	
1979	"Le bon temps du rock and roll"			—	FRA: 250,000	
1979	"Ma gueule"			—	FRA: 400,000	
1979	"Qu'est-ce que tu croyais"			—	FRA: 200,000	
1980	"A partir de maintenant"			—	FRA: 250,000	
1980	" La fille de l'hiver "			—	FRA: 150,000	
1981	"Chez Madame Lolita"			—	FRA: 150,000	
1981	"Excusez-moi de chanter encore du rock and roll"			—	FRA: 250,000	
1981	"Je t'ai aimée"			—	FRA: 150,000	
1981	"J'en ai marre"			—	FRA: 250,000	
1982	"Je suis victime de l'amour"			—	FRA: 200,000	
1982	"Le pénitencier version 82"			—	FRA: 80,000	
1982	"Mon Amérique à moi"			—	FRA: 200,000	
1982	"Montpellier"			—	FRA: 150,000	
1983	"Cartes postales d'Alabama"			—	FRA: 150,000	
1983	"L'amour violent"			—	FRA: 100,000	
1983	"Pour ceux qui s'aiment"			—	FRA: 250,000	
1984	"Mon p'tit loup"			—	FRA: 100,000	
1984	"Rien à personne"			—	FRA: 150,000	
1985	"Le chanteur abandonné"	13		—	FRA: 250,000	
1985	"Quelque chose de Tennessee"	10		25		SNEP: Silver
1986	"Aimer vivre"	28		—		
1986	"Je t'attends"	23		—		
1987	"J'oublierai ton nom" (duo with Carmel)	7		—		SNEP: Silver
1987	"Je te promets"	1*²		19	FRA: 310,000+	SNEP: Silver
1987	"Laura"	5		62	FRA: 310,000+	
1988	"L'Envie" (en concert à Bercy) live	15		—		
1988	"Que je t'aime" / "Le chanteur abandonné (en concert à Bercy) live	31		—		
1989	"Mirador"	3		—		SNEP: Silver
1989	"Si j'étais moi"	25		—		
1990	"Les vautours..."	30		—		
1990	"Himalaya"	30		—		
1990	"Cadillac"	39		—		
1991	"Je ne suis pas un héros" [Bercy 90] (live)	18		—		
1991	"Diego libre dans sa tête"	10		58		
1991	"Ça ne change pas un homme"	7		—		
1992	"Dans un an ou un jour"	7		—		
1992	"Et puis je sais"	16		—		
1992	"True to You"	18		—		
1992	"Laisse les filles"	39		—		
1993	"La guitare fait mal" (Bercy-Tour 92) live	33		—		
1993	"Je veux te graver dans ma vie" (Live)	16		—		
1993	"Je serai là"	8		—		
1993	"Requiem pour un fou" [Parc des Princes 1993] (live)	28		—		
1994	"I Wanna Make Love to You"	18		—		
1995	"Love Affair" (feat. Kathy Mattea)	35		—		
1995	"J'la croise tous les matins"	7	21	—		
1995	"Ne m'oublie pas"	18	18	—		
1995	"Quand le masque tombe"	22	—	—		
1996	"Rester libre"	28	—	—		
1996	"L'hymne à l'amour"	5	5	—		
1996	"Tes tendres années" [Bercy 1995] (live)	14	32	—		
1996	"Fool For Love (Requiem pour un fou)" (duo with Michael Bolton)	12	12	—		
1996	"La ville des âmes en peine"	12	—	—		
1998	"Ce que je sais"	9	16	—		
1998	"Debout"	58	—	—		
1998	"Allumer le feu"	11	—	69		
1998	"Seul"	32	—	—		
1999	"Requiem pour un fou" (duet with Lara Fabian)	8	11	54		
1999	"Vivre pour le meilleur"	2	2	40		FRA: Gold
1999	"Un jour viendra"	6	5	—		SNEP: Gold
1999	"Sang pour sang"	9	12	53		
2000	"Partie de cartes"	13	34	—		
2000	"Pardon"	9	28	—		
2000	"Viens danser le twist"	40	—	—		
2000	"Les mauvais garçons"	35	—	—		
2000	"Que je t'aime" / "Je suis né dans la rue"	7	—	35		
2000	"Ô Carole"	38	—	—		
2000	"Excuse-moi partenaire"	46	—	—		
2000	"Noir c'est noir"	47	—	—		
2000	"Serre la main d'un fou"	45	—	—		
2000	"Douce violence"	41	—	—		
2000	"Da dou ron ron"	37	—	—		
2000	"Quand revient la nuit"	29	—	—		
2000	"Quelques cris"	11	35	—		
2001	"Pauvres diables (vous les femmes)"	17	14	—		
2001	"On a tous besoin d'amour" (duo with Clémence)	4	3	—		
2002	"Tous ensemble"	1	11	—	FRA: 421,000	FRA: Platinum
2002	"Marie"	1	2	7	FRA: 1,400,000	FRA: Diamond; BEL: Platinum
2003	"Ne reviens pas"	8	20	59		
2003	"L'instinct"	9	17	32		
2003	"Je n'ai jamais pleuré"	4	4	38		
2004	"Tout au bout de nos peines" (duo with Isabelle Boulay)	8	7	23		SNEP: Gold
2005	"Ma religion dans son regard"	2	2	16		
2005	"Mon plus beau Noël"	1	2	14		
2006	"Le temps passe" (with Ministere Amer feat. Doc Gyneco)	4	9	54		
2006	"La paix"	16	2 (Ultratip)	85		
2006	"La loi du silence"	1	5	44		
2006	"La quête"	6	7	61		
2007	"Always"	2	8	56		
2008	"Ça n'finira jamais"	1	12	—		
2008	"Si mon cœur"	—	9 (Ultratip)	—		
2010	"Et maintenant... (Tour 66)" (live)	3	—	—		
2011	"Jamais seul"	—	6 (Ultratip)	—		
2011	"Je viendrai te chercher" (duo with Patrick Fiori)	—	17 (Ultratip)	—		
2011	"La douceur de vivre"	64	30	—		
2011	"Guitar Hero"	—	22 (Ultratip)	—		
2012	"Autoportrait"	23	—	—		
2012	"L'envie"	3	—	26		FRA: Gold
2012	"L'attente"	26	13	—		
2013	"20 ans"	38	10 (Ultratip)	—		
2013	"Un jour l'amour te trouvera"	90	—	—		
2014	"Derrière l'amour"	49	10 (Ultratip)	—		
2014	"Regarde-nous"	14	41	—		
2014	"Seul"	13	32	—		
2014	"Rester vivant"	148	—	—		
2014	"Te manquer"	179	—	—		
2015	"De l'amour"	36	31	—		
2018	"J'en parlerai au diable"	1**	22	29	FRA: 2,370	
2018	"Pardonne-moi"	3***	—	67		

*Those with the note "Ultratip" did not appear in the official Belgian Ultratop 50 charts, but rather in the bubbling under Ultratip charts.

*² "Je te promets" originally peaked at number 6 in 1987, but re-entered at number 1 in 2017 on French sales chart.

** "J'en parlerai au diable" reached number one on the French sales chart, but peaked at number 11 on the Top Singles (Download + Streaming).

*** "Pardonne-moi" reached number 3 on French sales chart, but peaked at number 22 on the Top Singles (Download + Streaming)
