= List of number-one singles of 2002 (France) =

This is a list of the French SNEP Top 100 Singles and Top 150 Albums number-ones of 2002.

== Number-one by week ==
=== Singles Chart ===
Week	Issue Date	Artist	Single
1	January 5	Star Academy	"La musique"
2	January 12	Star Academy	"La musique"
3	January 19	Star Academy	"La musique"
4	January 26	Star Academy	"La musique"
5	February 2	Star Academy	"La musique"
6	February 9	Star Academy	"Gimme! Gimme! Gimme! (A Man After Midnight)"
7	February 16	Star Academy	"Gimme! Gimme! Gimme! (A Man After Midnight)"
8	February 23	Marc Lavoine and Cristina Marocco	"J'ai tout oublié"
9	March 2	Marc Lavoine and Cristina Marocco	"J'ai tout oublié"
10	March 9	Rohff	"Qui est l'exemple?"
11	March 16	Rohff	"Qui est l'exemple?"
12	March 23	Rohff	"Qui est l'exemple?"
13	March 30	Shakira	"Whenever, Wherever"
14	April 6	Shakira	"Whenever, Wherever"
15	April 14	Shakira	"Whenever, Wherever"
16	April 20	Shakira	"Whenever, Wherever"
17	April 27	Johnny Hallyday	"Tous ensemble"
18	May 4	Bratisla Boys	"Stach Stach"
19	May 11	Bratisla Boys	"Stach Stach"
20	May 18	Bratisla Boys	"Stach Stach"
21	May 25	Bratisla Boys	"Stach Stach"
22	June 1	Bratisla Boys	"Stach Stach"
23	June 8	Bratisla Boys	"Stach Stach"
24	June 15	Marlène Duval and Phil Barney	"Un enfant de toi"
25	June 22	Marlène Duval and Phil Barney	"Un enfant de toi"
26	June 29	Marlène Duval and Phil Barney	"Un enfant de toi"
27	July 6	Bratisla Boys	"Stach Stach"
28	July 13	Félicien	"Cum-cum mania"
29	July 20	Indochine	"J'ai demandé à la lune"
30	July 27	Bratisla Boys	"Stach stach"
31	August 3	Bratisla Boys	"Stach stach"
32	August 10	Bratisla Boys	"Stach stach"
33	August 17	MC Solaar	"Inch'Allah"
34	August 24	MC Solaar	"Inch'Allah"
35	August 31	MC Solaar	"Inch'Allah"
36	September 7	MC Solaar	"Inch'Allah"
37	September 14	Las Ketchup	"Asereje"
38	September 21	Las Ketchup	"Asereje"
39	September 28	Las Ketchup	"Asereje"
40	October 5	Las Ketchup	"Asereje"
41	October 12	Las Ketchup	"Asereje"
42	October 19	Las Ketchup	"Asereje"
43	October 26	Las Ketchup	"Asereje"
44	November 2	Las Ketchup	"Asereje"
45	November 9	Las Ketchup	"Asereje"
46	November 16	Johnny Hallyday	"Marie"
47	November 23	Las Ketchup	"Asereje"
48	November 30	Whatfor	"Plus haut"
49	December 7	Las Ketchup	"Asereje"
50	December 14	Johnny Hallyday	"Marie"
51	December 21	Johnny Hallyday	"Marie"
52	December 28	Star Academy 2	"Paris Latino"

=== Albums Chart ===
Week	Issue Date	Artist	Title
1	5 January	Star Academy	L'album
2	12 January	Star Academy	L'album
3	19 January	Star Academy	L'album
4	26 January	Star Academy	L'album
5	2 February	Star Academy	L'album
6	9 February	Star Academy	L'album
7	16 February	Star Academy	L'album
8	23 February	Les Enfoirés	Tous dans le même bâteau
9	2 March	Les Enfoirés	Tous dans le même bâteau
10	9 March	Les Enfoirés	Tous dans le même bâteau
11	16 March	Les Enfoirés	Tous dans le même bâteau
12	23 March	Les Enfoirés	Tous dans le même bâteau
13	30 March	Céline Dion	A New Day Has Come
14	6 April	Céline Dion	A New Day Has Come
15	14 April	Céline Dion	A New Day Has Come
16	20 April	Lynda Lemay	Les lettres rouges
17	27 April	Lynda Lemay	Les lettres rouges
18	4 May	Céline Dion	A New Day Has Come
19	11 May	Lynda Lemay	Les lettres rouges
20	18 May	Moby	18
21	25 May	Moby	"18"
22	1 June	Renaud	Boucan d'enfer
23	8 June	Renaud	Boucan d'enfer
24	15 June	Renaud	Boucan d'enfer
25	22 June	Patrick Bruel	Entre deux
26	29 June	Patrick Bruel	Entre deux
27	6 July	Patrick Bruel	Entre deux
28	13 July	Patrick Bruel	Entre deux
29	20 July	Patrick Bruel	Entre deux
30	27 July	Patrick Bruel	Entre deux
31	3 August	Patrick Bruel	Entre deux
32	10 August	Patrick Bruel	Entre deux
33	17 August	Patrick Bruel	Entre deux
34	24 August	Renaud	Boucan d'enfer
35	31 August	Renaud	Boucan d'enfer
36	7 September	Patrick Bruel	Entre deux
37	14 September	Patrick Bruel	Entre deux
38	21 September	Lorie	Tendrement
39	28 September	Lorie	Tendrement
40	5 October	L5	Retiens-moi
41	12 October	Lorie	Tendrement
42	19 October	Lorie	Tendrement
43	26 October	Alain Bashung	L'imprudence
44	2 November	Star Academy 2	Chante Michel Berger
45	9 November	Johnny Hallyday	À la vie, à la mort !
46	16 November	Johnny Hallyday	À la vie, à la mort !
47	23 November	Johnny Hallyday	À la vie, à la mort !
48	30 November	Johnny Hallyday	À la vie, à la mort !
49	7 December	Star Academy 2	Star Academy chante les tubes des années 80
50	14 December	Johnny Hallyday	À la vie, à la mort !
51	21 December	Star Academy 2	Star Academy chante les tubes des années 80
52	28 December	Star Academy 2	Star Academy chante les tubes des années 80

== Top Ten Best Sales ==
This is the ten best-selling singles and albums in 2002.

=== Singles ===
Pos.	Artist	Title
1	Las Ketchup	"Asereje"
2	Bratisla Boys	"Stach Stach"
3	Shakira	"Whenever, Wherever"
4	Johnny Hallyday	"Marie"
5	Indochine	"J'ai demandé à la lune"
6	Natasha St-Pier	"Tu trouveras"
7	Umberto Tozzi & Lena Ka	"Ti amo (rien que des mots)"
8	Rohff	"Qui est l'exemple ?"
9	Renaud & Axelle Red	"Manhattan-Kaboul"
10	Star Academy 2	"Musique"

=== Albums ===
Pos.	Artist	Title
1	Patrick Bruel	Entre deux
2	Renaud	Boucan d'enfer
3	Johnny Hallyday	À la vie, à la mort !
4	Star Academy	L'album
5	Céline Dion	A New Day Has Come
6	Star Academy 2	Star Academy chante les tubes des années 80
7	Indochine	Paradize
8	Star Academy 2	Les années Berger
9	Jean-Jacques Goldman	Chansons pour les pieds
10	Jenifer	Jenifer

== See also ==
- 2002 in music
- List of number-one hits (France)
- List of artists who reached number one on the French Singles Chart
