= Je te promets =

Je te promets may refer to:

- "Je te promets", song by Johnny Hallyday from Gang (1986)
- "Je te promets", song by Zaho from Dima (2008)
- Je te promets, a 2021–23 French-language TV series based on This Is Us
