= Hervé (singer) =

French singer-songwriter and producer (born 1991)

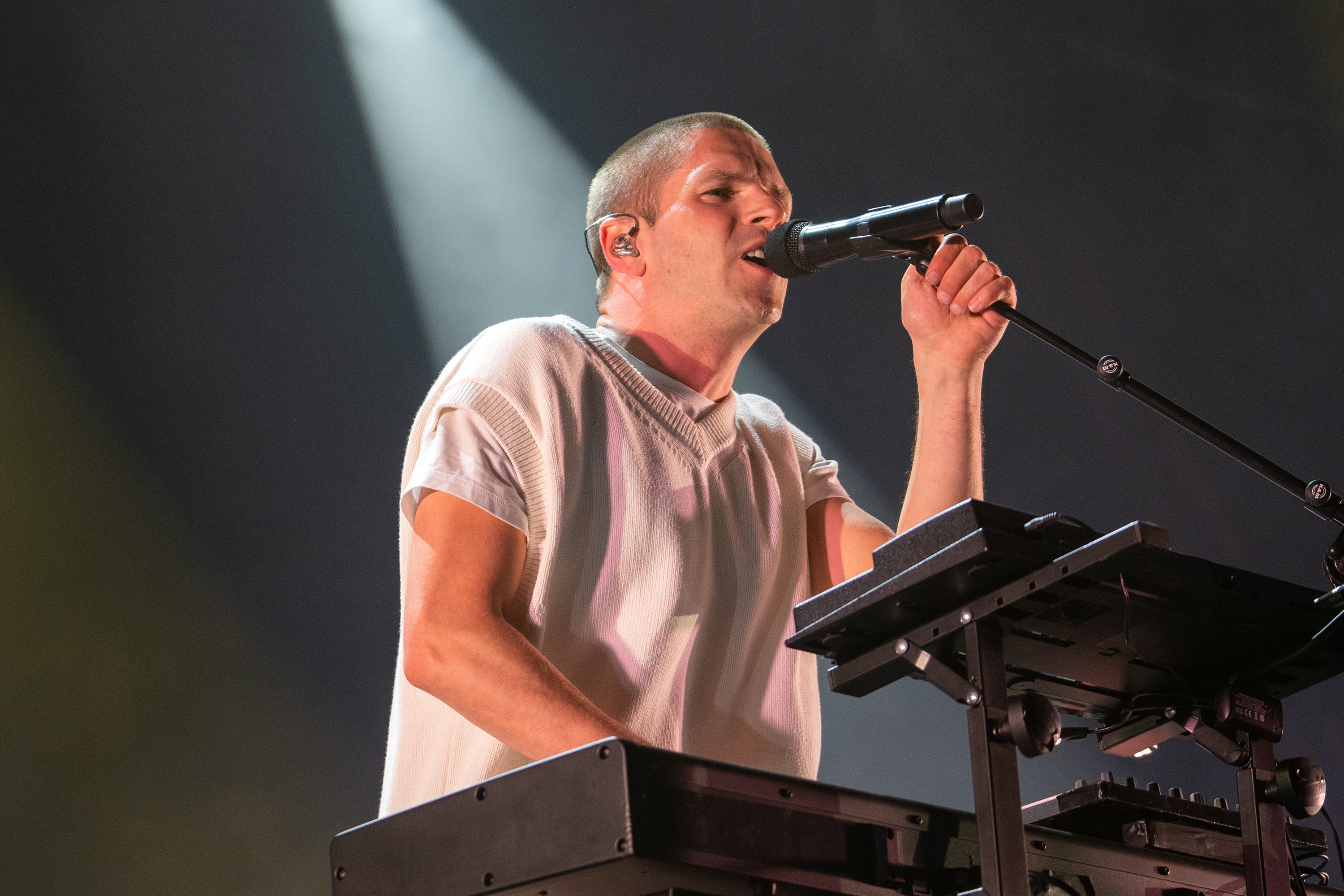
- Hervé in concert in 2023.

Background information
- Born: Hervé Le Sourd; February 12, 1991 (age 35); Saint-Cyr-l'École, France
- Genres: Singer; Electronic music
- Occupations: Singer-songwriter musician Producteur
- Instruments: Voice; Keyboard
- Years active: Since 2015
- Label: Initial Artist Services
- Website: herve.store

Hervé Le Sourd, known as Hervé (born February 19, 1991) is a French singer-songwriter, musician, and producer.

He is self-taught and draws inspiration from various musical styles: britpop, jungle, drum and bass. His debut album Hyper, released in 2020, won the Male Revelation of the Year award at the Victoires de la Musique in 2021.

== Biography ==
=== Youth ===
Hervé was born in February 1991 in Saint-Cyr-l'École. He was raised by his single mother in Fontenay-le-Fleury. He first dreamed of becoming a professional footballer.

He grew up listening to the songs of Alain Bashung, Jacques Higelin, and the group Daft Punk.

=== Career ===
==== 2015–2018: Beginnings in the group Postaal ====
In 2015, Hervé began his career in the Franco-British duo Postaal with Englishman Dennis Brown.

Their debut single, Freedom, helped the duo gain attention.

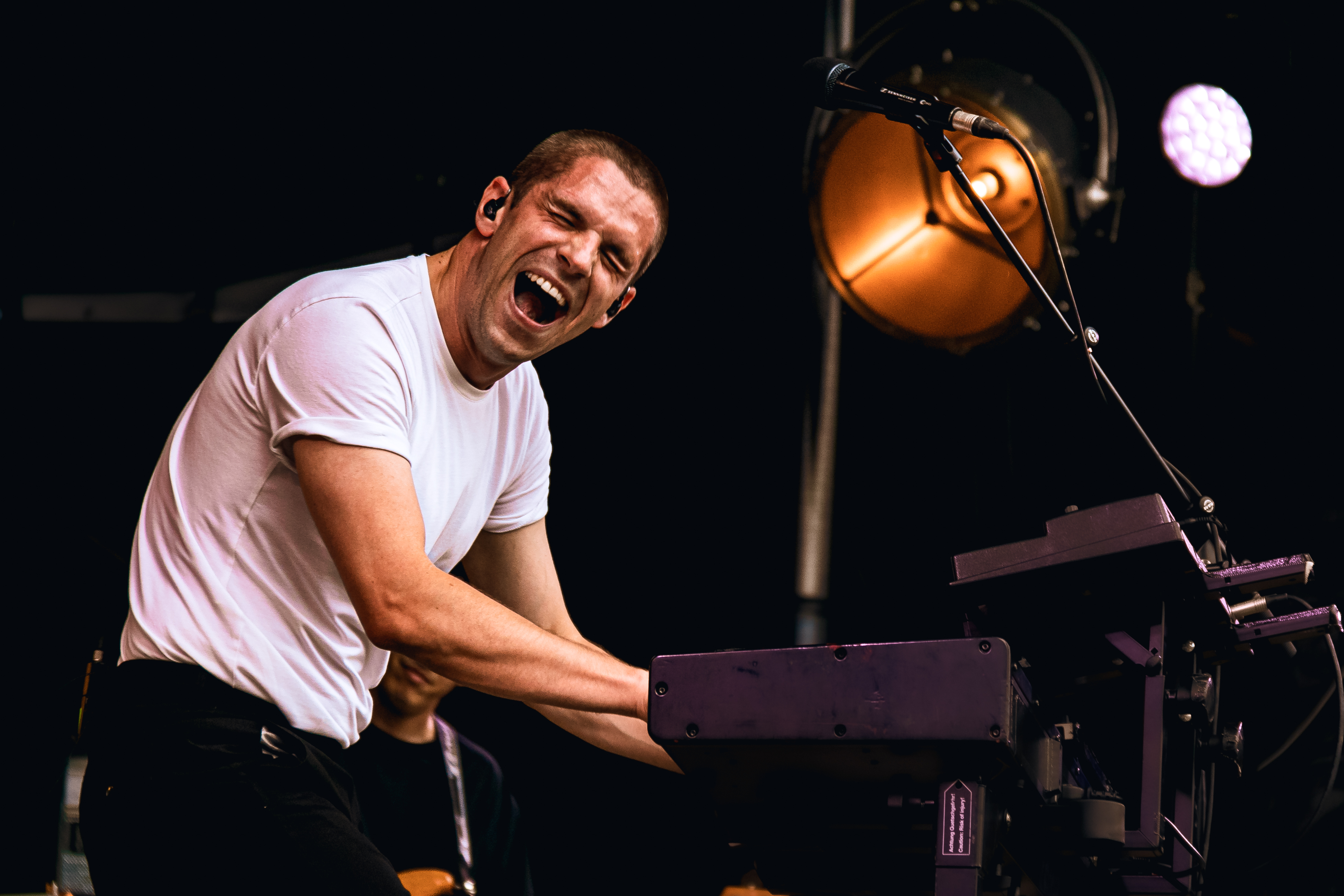
On tour with their first album

Their first album was released in 2018, and Hervé toured with Eddy de Pretto for the opening acts of his tour to launch his solo career. That same year, in collaboration with Yodelice, he co-wrote three tracks (Pardonne-moi, Je ne suis qu'un homme, and Un enfant du siècle) for the posthumous album Mon pays c'est l'amour by Johnny Hallyday.

==== 2019–2021: Solo career and debut album Hyper ====
In May 2019, he released his first EP, Mélancolie F.C.

In June 2020, his first solo album Hyper was released. The album is described by Télérama as "a powerful generational uppercut."

In February 2021, he won the Male Revelation award at the Victoires de la Musique.

==== Since 2022 ====
In 2022, his six-month Hyper Tour was nominated for the Victoires de la Musique.

In 2023, Hervé announced the release of his second album Intérieur vie, which coincides with the birth of his first child.

In 2024, Hervé released his third album, Adrénaline. Due to a manufacturing error, the album contained music from the artist Luis Fonsi instead of his own.

== Participation ==
Since 2019, he has been the patron of the association Les éveillés in support of exiles. Since November 2023, he has been the patron of the Festival ODP Talence, benefiting the orphans of French firefighters.

== Discography ==
=== Studio albums ===
2020: Hyper (Romance Musique)
1. Le premier jour du reste de ma nuit
2. Trésor
3. Cœur poids plume
4. Maelström
5. Si bien du mal
6. Fureur de vivre
7. Paréo parade
8. Addenda
9. La peur des mots
10. Des airs de toi
11. Bel air
2023: Intérieur vie (Romance Musique)
1. D'où je viens
2. Autour de moi
3. Tout ira mieux demain
4. Si tu savais
5. 25ème heure
6. Chelou
7. Pulsions
8. Rester
9. La lettre
10. Dans la peau
11. Mémoire
2024: Adrénaline (Mélancolie F.C. / Romance Musique)
1. Encore
2. Sémaphore
3. Comme tout le monde
4. Moins une
5. Adrénaline
6. Tube de l’été
7. Séquelle
8. Odeur
9. CLASHHH!
10. Rien de personnel

Upon its release, this last album was mistakenly pressed with reggaeton tracks by Luis Fonsi.

=== Re-releases ===
2021: Hyper – Prolongations (Romance Musique)
1. Le premier jour du reste de ma nuit
2. Trésor
3. Cœur poids plume
4. Maelström
5. Si bien du mal
6. Fureur de vivre
7. Paréo parade
8. Addenda
9. La peur des mots
10. Des airs de toi
11. Bel air
12. Monde meilleur
13. Permis de construire
14. Si elle me revient pas
15. Rodéo
16. L'an zéro

=== EPs ===
2019: Mélancolie F.C. (Initial Artist Services)
1. Mélancolie F.C.
2. Cœur poids plume
3. La peur des mots
4. Dis-moi toi
5. En rappel
6. Va piano

=== Singles ===
- 2017: Mélancolie F.C
- 2018: Va piano
- 2019: La peur des mots
- 2019: Cœur poids plume
- 2020: Le premier jour du reste de ma nuit
- 2020: Si bien du mal
- 2020: Trésor
- 2020: Maelström
- 2020: Addenda
- 2021: Monde meilleur (Remix)
- 2023: D'où je viens
- 2023: Si tu savais
- 2023: Ultra Chelou
- 2024: Sémaphore
- 2024: Comme tout le monde
- 2024: Encore

== Awards ==
=== Victoires de la Musique ===
Year	Work name	Category	Result
2021	Lui-même	Male Revelation of the Year	Won
2022	Hyper Tour	Concert	Finalist, lost to Ben Mazué
