= La Peur =

La Peur may refer to:

- La Peur (album), a 1982 album by Johnny Hallyday, or the title song
- "La Peur" (short story), an 1882 short story by Guy de Maupassant
- La Peur, a 1930 novel by Gabriel Chevallier
- La Peur (1936 film), a film based on Stefan Zweig's 1910 novel Die Angst
- La Peur (2005 film), a short film directed by Meta Akkus
- The Fear (2015 film), a French film
