= Church of Our Lady of the Assumption, Lorient =

Coordinates: 17.9054°N 62.8238°W

Church of Our Lady of the Assumption
- Église Notre-Dame-de-l'Assomption de Lorient
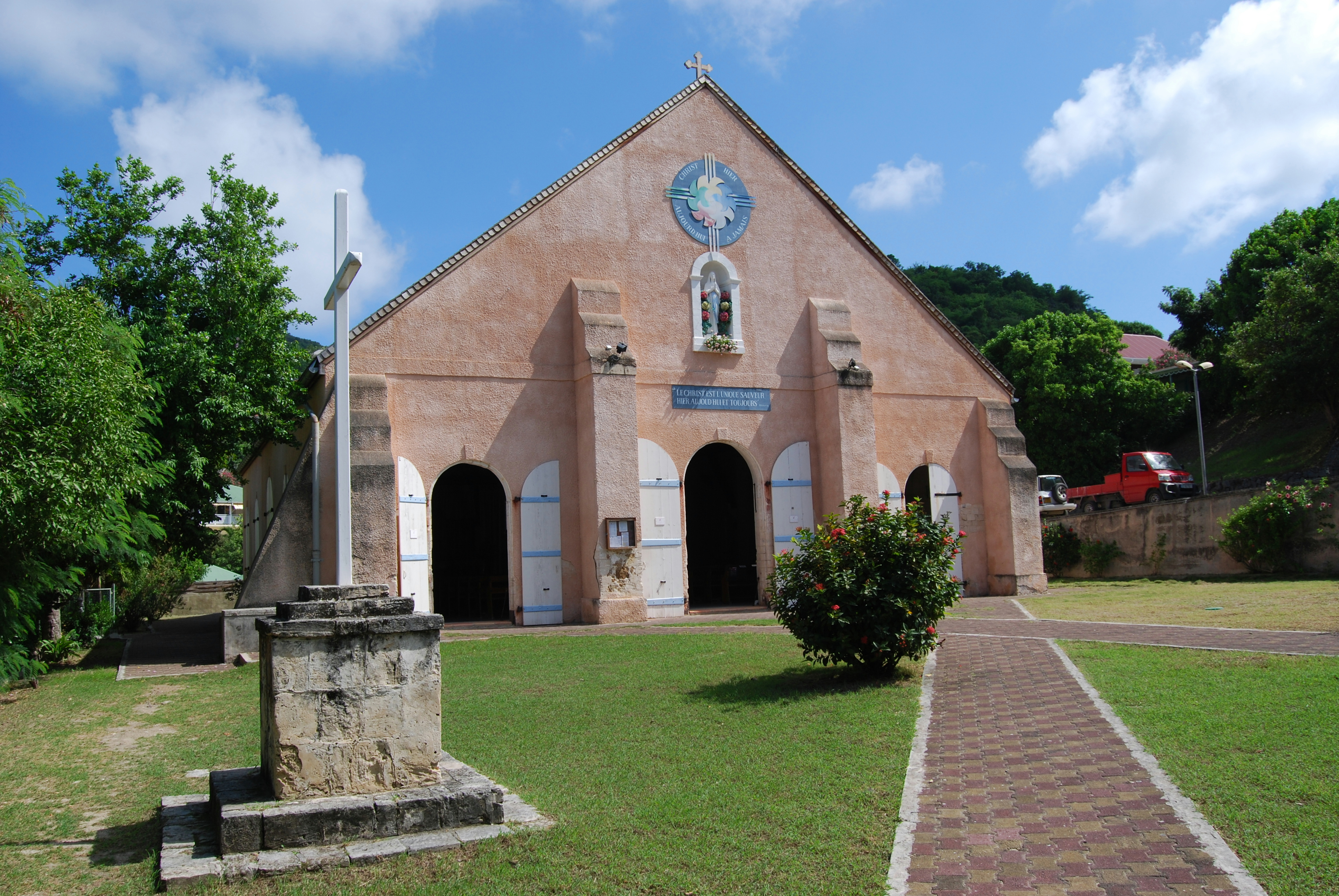
- Church of Our Lady of the Assumption, Lorient
- Church of Our Lady of the Assumption
- Location: Lorient
- Country: Saint Barthélemy, France
- Denomination: Roman Catholic Church

Administration
- Diocese: Roman Catholic Diocese of Basse-Terre

The Church of Our Lady of the Assumption (French: Église Notre-Dame-de-l'Assomption de Lorient) is a Catholic church that was built around 1850, located on the island of Saint-Barthélemy, in the district of Lorient. Its bell tower is protected with the title of Historic Monument.

The Church of Our Lady of the Assumption was founded around 1724. It was later razed to the ground by privateers, only to be rebuilt in 1820, with the aid of the colonial governor of Sweden, and again in 1871 by Father Couturier. The temple sustained damage during an earthquake on November 4, 1974. This necessitated major repairs of beams, walls and blinds in 1988.

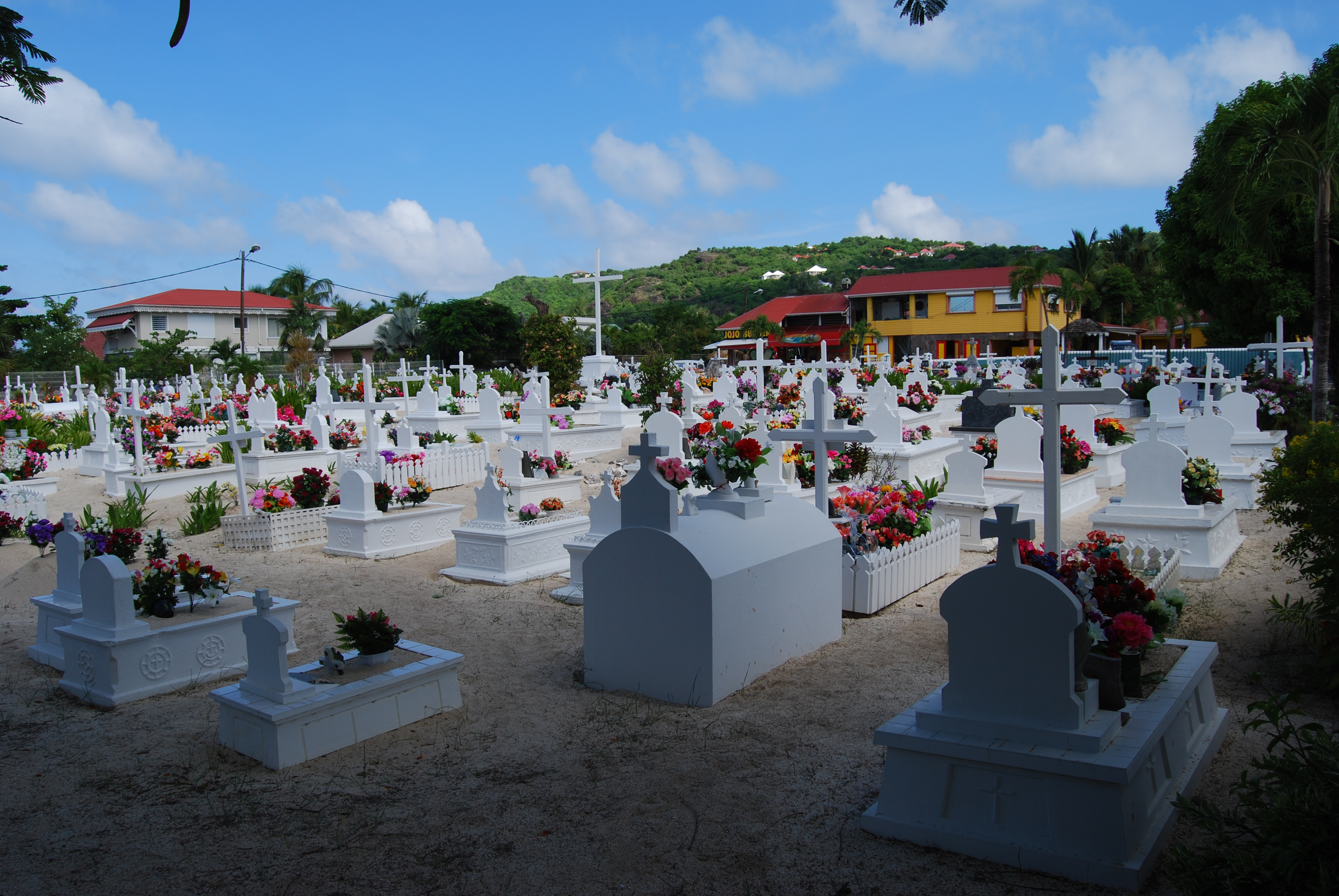
The churchyard

The bell tower, built in 1850, served as a refuge for sailors. The bell was cast in 1860 in Nantes.

== See also ==
- Roman Catholicism in France
- Church of Our Lady of the Assumption, Gustavia
