= Quelque part un aigle =

Studio album by Johnny Hallyday
- Released: February 1, 1982
- Recorded: 1981
- Genre: Pop, rock
- Label: Philips, Universal Music
- Producer: Pierre Billon

Johnny Hallyday chronology
Johnny au Bois de Boulogne (1982)	Quelque part un aigle (1982)	La Peur (1982)

Singles from Quelque part un aigle
- 1. "Montpellier" Released: February 19, 1982; 2. "Mon Amérique à moi" Released: June 18, 1982

Quelque part un aigle is a 1982 album of the French singer Johnny Hallyday. The same year, it achieved Gold status for over 100,000 units sold.

== Track listing ==
1. "La Caisse" 4:18
2. "Sage Pour Vous" 5:43
3. "On Va Vous en Donner du Rock" 3:59
4. "Mercredi Matin" 4:57
5. "L' Hosto" 3:30
6. "Mon Amerique a Moi" 4:5
7. "Montpellier" 4:28
8. "Cure de Blues" 3:42
9. "Decalage Horaire" 3:53

Source: Entre Violence et Violon track listing

== Personnel ==
- Georges Doering, Bill Fowler, Éric Bouad, Slim "Slimou" Pezin, Bruno Victoire, José Souc - guitar
- Al Perkins - steel guitar
- Steve Marsion, Éric Bouad, Sauveur Mallia - bass
- Ed Greene, Joe Hammer, Pierre Billon - drums
- Steve Rucker - keyboards
- Ryan Ulyate, Roger Loubet - synthesizer
- Joel Peskin - saxophone
- The Waters, Éric Bouad, Bruno Victoire, Pierre Billon, Ryan Ulyate, Henri Loustau, John Volaitis, Ross Stein, Hervé Hochet - backing vocals
- Eric Bouad - conductor
