= Lorient (disambiguation) =

Lorient or L'Orient may refer to:

- Lorient, a town in Brittany, France
  - FC Lorient, a French professional football league team
- Lorient, Saint Barthélemy
- L'Orient, Switzerland, a village forming part of the municipality of Le Chenit in Vaud, Switzerland
- French ship L'Orient (1791), a French warship, sunk at the Battle of the Nile
- Raid on Lorient, a 1746 British attempt to capture the town during the War of the Austrian Succession
- L'Orient, Lebanese newspaper founded in 1924 that was merged in 1971 with Le Jour to form the L'Orient-Le Jour.

== See also ==
- Orient (disambiguation)
