= Gang (album) =

Studio album by Johnny Hallyday
- Released: December 6, 1986
- Recorded: September–December 1986
- Studio: Studio Gang, Paris
- Genre: Pop, rock
- Label: Philips, Universal Music
- Producer: Jean-Jacques Goldman

Johnny Hallyday chronology
Rock'n'Roll Attitude (1985)	Gang (1986)	Cadillac (1989)

Singles from Gang
- 1. "Je t'attends" Released: November 1986; 2. "J'oublierai ton nom (duo Carmel)" Released: January 1987; 3. "Je te promets" Released: June 1987; 4. "Laura" Released: October 8, 1987

Gang is an album by Johnny Hallyday, written and produced by Jean-Jacques Goldman and released in December 1986.

== Track listing ==
1. "L'Envie"
2. "Je t'attends"
3. "J'oublierai ton nom"
4. "Toute seule"
5. "Je te promets"
6. "Laura"
7. "Tu peux chercher"
8. "Dans mes nuits... on oublie"
9. "Encore"
10. "Ton fils"

Source: Gang track listing
