= Quelque chose de Tennessee =

1985 single by Johnny Hallyday

Single by Johnny Hallyday

from the album Rock'n'Roll Attitude
- Language: French
- English title: Something from Tennessee
- B-side: "Équipe de nuit"
- Released: October 1985
- Recorded: April 1985
- Studio: Studio Tempo, Montréal
- Genre: Pop rock
- Length: 4:10
- Label: Philips
- Songwriter: Michel Berger
- Producer: Michel Berger

Johnny Hallyday singles chronology
| "Rock'n'roll attitude" (1985) | "Quelque chose de Tennessee" (1985) | "Aimer vivre" (1986) |

"Quelque chose de Tennessee" ("Something from Tennessee") is a 1985 song recorded by French singer Johnny Hallyday. Written and produced by Michel Berger, it was released in December 1985 as the third single from the album Rock'n'Roll Attitude, on which it appears as the third track. It is a tribute to American playwright and screenwriter Tennessee Williams, who created A Streetcar Named Desire (1947), Cat on a Hot Tin Roof (1955), Sweet Bird of Youth (1959), and The Night of the Iguana (1961), among others. The song was a top ten hit in France and became one of Hallyday's most popular songs over many years.

== Composition ==
The song opens with Nathalie Baye (Hallyday's then partner) reading (in French) Margaret's last words to Brick in Cat on a Hot Tin Roof, which conclude the play by Tennessee Williams:

"Ah, you, weak and wonderful men who are so grateful to withdraw from the game! You need a hand, placed on your shoulder, to push you towards life... this tender and light hand..."

Peter Frampton was the guitarist, and Michel Berger and France Gall participated in the backing vocals.

The black and white music video, directed by Bernard Schmitt, was selected for the 1985 first edition of the Victoires de la musique, in the "Best clip" category.

== Critical and commercial reception ==
The song was generally well received by critics. Elia Habib, expert of the French charts, stated: "The song is of a rare sensitivity, and as much the lyrics, by a play of mirror ("this dream in us with its own words") and of sounds ("the heart in fever and the demolished body"), as the melancholy and starry music, participate in theto convey emotion".

In France, "Quelque chose de Tennessee" debuted at number 20 on the chart edition of 21 December 1985, then reached a peak of number ten in its eighth week and eventually totalled 18 weeks in the top 50. It achieved Silver status, awarded by the Syndicat National de l'Édition Phonographique, the French certificator, for over 250,000 units sold. After Hallyday's death in 2017, it re-charted for other four weeks, peaking at number 14. Similarly, it entered the Swiss singles chart at number 61, then climbed to number 25, and fell off the top 100 after these two weeks.

== Live performances ==
"Quelque chose de Tennessee" was regularly performed during Hallyday's tours and thus included on many live albums: Johnny à Bercy and Live at Montreux 1988 (1988), Dans la chaleur de Bercy (1991), Bercy 92 and Parc des Princes 1993 (1993), À La Cigale (1994), Lorada Tour (1996), 100 % Johnny : Live à la tour Eiffel, Olympia 2000 and Happy Birthday Live - Parc de Sceaux 15.06.2000 (as a duet with Michel Sardou) (2000), Parc des Princes 2003 and Hallyday Bercy 2003 (2003), La Cigale : 12-17 décembre 2006 (2007), Tour 66 : Stade de France 2009 (2009), On Stage and Born Rocker Tour (2013), Son rêve américain - Live au Beacon Theatre de New-York 2014 (2014), Rester Vivant Tour (2016), Les Vieilles Canailles Le Live (as a duet with Jacques Dutronc) (2019).

On 20 March 1988, at the Hippodrome de Vincennes, during the meeting of the candidate Jacques Chirac in the presidential election, Hallyday, who was present, stated before singing "Quelque chose de Tennessee": "I would like to dedicate this song to Jacques Chirac. We all have something of Jacques Chirac within us". Michel Berger, then supportive and close to François Mitterrand, did not appreciate this change in the title.

== Cover versions ==
"Quelque chose de Tennessee" is, after "La musique que j'aime", Hallyday's song the most performed as duets: indeed, he performed it 28 times with different 25 artists. He sung it five times with Michel Berger, including two times on TV and three times on stage (the Chanteurs sans frontières' concert tour in la Courneuve in October 1985, Berger's concert at the Zénith Paris in 1986, Hallyday's final concert in Bercy in 1987) At the time of the recitals at the Olympia in 2000 by Hallyday, France Gall also sang it with him from 12 to 15 August 2000. "Quelque chose de Tennessee" was also covered by Nolwenn Leroy in 2017 on the album On a tous quelque chose de Johnny and by Sylvie Vartan in 2018 on the album Avec toi.

== Track listings ==
- 7" single
1. "Quelque chose de Tennessee" — 4:10
2. "Équipe de nuit" — 3:50
- CD video
1. "Quelque chose de Tennessee" — 4:10
2. "Rock'n'Roll Attitude" — 3:30
3. "Le Chanteur abandonné" — 4:50
4. "Qui ose aimer" — 3:40
5. "Quelque chose de Tennessee" (video) — 4:10

== Charts and sales ==
=== Weekly charts ===
Weekly chart performance for "Quelque chose de Tennessee"
| Chart (1985) | Peak position |
|---|---|
| Europe (European Hot 100) | 48 |
| France (SNEP) | 10 |

| Chart (2017) | Peak position |
|---|---|
| France (SNEP) | 14 |
| Switzerland (Schweizer Hitparade) | 25 |

=== Certifications ===
Certifications for "Quelque chose de Tennessee"
| Region | Certification | Certified units/sales |
|---|---|---|
| France (SNEP) | Silver | 250,000^{*} |
^{*} Sales figures based on certification alone.

== Release history ==
| Country | Date | Format | Label |
|---|---|---|---|
| France | 1985 | 7" single | Philips |
| France | 1988 | CD video | Philips |
