= Mirador (song) =

1989 single by Johnny Hallyday

Single by Johnny Hallyday

from the album Cadillac
- B-side: "Back to the Blues"
- Released: June 1989
- Recorded: 1989
- Studio: Gang Recording Studio, Paris
- Genre: Ballad, chanson
- Length: 4:22
- Label: Philips
- Composer(s): David Hallyday
- Lyricist(s): Étienne Roda-Gil
- Producer(s): Étienne Roda-Gil

Johnny Hallyday singles chronology
"Que je t'aime" (1988)	"Mirador" (1989)	"Si j'étais moi" (1989)

"Mirador" is a 1989 ballad recorded by French singer Johnny Hallyday. Written by Étienne Roda-Gil with a music composed by Hallyday's son David Hallyday, it was the first single from his 36th studio album Cadillac, on which it appears as the second track, and was released in June 1989. It achieved success in France where it was a top three hit.

== Background and writing ==
"Mirador" was written by Etienne Roda-Gil, who was previously the lyricist for Vanessa Paradis, and composed by David Hallyday. As the title suggests it, the song deals with the themes of prison and the lack of freedom; these issues were deemed as important by Hallyday, as prouved by the fact that "Mirador" was the fourth song of his discography to refer to prison (after "Le Pénitencier" (1964), "Toi qui t'en vas" (1965) and "Mercredi matin" (1982)). The B-side of the 7" single featured a new song titled "Back to the Blues" (written by Étienne Roda-Gil, composed by Georges Augier, Jacques Cardona and Érick Bamy). In 1990, David Hallyday used the music he had composed for "Morador" for his song "To Have and to Hold", included on his album Rock'n'Heart, with lyrics written in English by Lisa Catherine Cohen.

== Versions ==
Two live versions of "Mirador" were also recorded: the first one in 1993, on the album Dans la chaleur de Bercy, and the second one in 1993 as a duet with David Hallyday, in a version mixing French and English, available on Parc des Princes 1993.

== Chart performance ==
In France, "Mirador" debuted straight at number 12 on the chart edition of 1 July 1989, which was the highest debut that week; then it entered the top ten and reached a peak of three twice, in its third and eighth weeks, and remained for a total of 11 weeks in the top ten and 16 weeks in the top 50. It earned a silver disc, awarded by the Syndicat National de l'Édition Phonographique. On the Eurochart Hot 100 Singles, it started at number 44 on 15 July 1989, reached a peak of number 16 in its third week, and appeared on the chart for 14 weeks. Much played on radio, it also charted for 12 weeks on the European Airplay Hot 100, with a peak at number 22 in its third week, and was number one on the French Airplay Chart (AM stations).

== Track listings ==
- 7" single
1. "Mirador" — 4:22
2. "Back to the Blues" — 3:18
- 12" maxi
1. "Mirador" — 4:22
2. "Back to the Blues" — 3:18
3. "Mirador" (remix) — 4:42
- CD maxi
1. "Mirador" — 4:22
2. "Back to the Blues" — 3:18
3. "Mirador" (remix) — 4:42

== Personnel ==
- Mixing – Jean-Pierre Janiaud
- Music director – Jean-Pierre Bucolo
- Photography – Tony Frank
- Production – Étienne Roda-Gil
- Recording – Jean-Pierre Janiaud, Olivier Espirito Santo

== Charts and certifications ==
=== Weekly charts ===
Chart (1989)	Peak position
Europe (European Airplay Top 50)	22
Europe (Eurochart Hot 100)	16
France (Airplay Chart [AM Stations])	1
France (SNEP)	3

=== Year-end charts ===
Chart (1989)	Position
Europe (European Hot 100)	77

=== Certifications ===
Certifications for "Mirador"
Region	Certification	Certified units/sales
France (SNEP)	Silver	200,000^{*}
^{*} Sales figures based on certification alone.

== Release history ==
Country	Date	Format	Label
France	1989	7" single	Philips
France	1989	CD maxi	Philips
France	1989	12" maxi	Philips
