= Meta Akkus =

French film Director

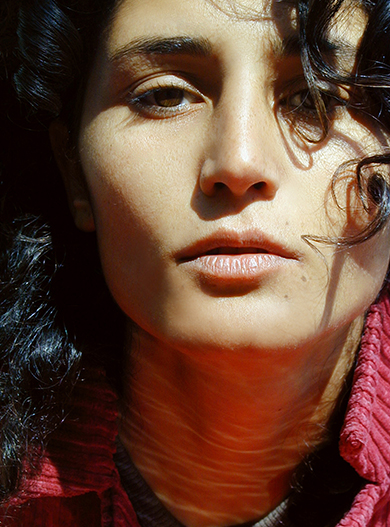
- Born: Turkey
- Education: Central St Martins
- Occupations: Film director; Producer; Writer
- Years active: 1998–present
- Height: 1.7 m (5 ft 7 in)
- Website: https://metaakkus.net/

Meta Akkus is a French–Turkish film director, screenwriter, author, and producer. She is best known for her fantasy family film Make A Wish (Bir Dilek Tut)

== Early life ==
Meta Akkus, born in Turkey, grew up in Paris, France. She went to Middle School Béranger, located in Le Marais. There she joined the school's theater and studied acting for the next seven years, performing in different classical plays.

In the last year of middle school, Akkus was assigned, by her history teacher, to direct a documentary about World War II students that were deported to concentration camps from her school, Beranger, in 1940.

At the age of 17, Akkus dropped out of Henri-Bergson high school in Paris, put her acting on hold, to write and direct her first play, "Le Temps N'Existe Pas".

Akkus directs her first short film, La Solitude, at the age of 18. This led her to move to London, to study and work in films.

== Film career ==
In London, Akkus attended directing classes at Panico Film, she then continued at Central St Martins. She worked as a runner on the set of the James Bond film, The World Is Not Enough, directed by Michael Apted

Her next assignment as an assistant director working on various productions including an advertising campaign for Micron PC, directed by Terry Gilliam, for Radical Media.

She learned how to edit films at Swordfish Editing in Soho, working as an assistant editor for over a year, where she produced, directed, and edited her second short film, Unsatisfaction on 35mm. This short was bought by Canal+ for television broadcast.

BBD Productions, Paris signed her as one of their three exclusive commercial directors, the other two being Luc Besson and Jean-Paul Goude. At BBD, Akkus directed many commercials and music videos around the world, for such global Luxury Brands as Chanel, Lux, Evian, Mini Cooper, Paşabahçe, BP, and Pınar.

Meta Akkus participated in the 5th International Izmir Short Film Festival in November 2004 with her short films La Peur, Zero Tues and Unsatisfaction.

In Cape Town, Akkus directed advertisements for Group Saur, where she created a whole African village and showed people carrying water from every corner of the Earth to Africa.

In 2009–2010, Akkus directed the interview scenes in the documentary, Turkish Passport, about World War II, Turkish-Jewish survivors.

Akkus started and directed a music video for a Copenhagen based pop trio band Who Made Who for their song.

She is the author of two published books, in Turkey, Aşktan Ötürü and Abrakadabra.

Akkus directed four music videos for the Turkish rock singer, "Kiraç". For whom, she wrote and directed a short film for his song "Senden Başka" a story about a boy's love for his mother, which airs on Turkish Television Channels every year on Mother's Day.

Meta Akkus wrote, produced, and directed her first feature film "Make A Wish" (Bir Dilek Tut) in 2022. Make A Wish, a magical coming-of-age film, for family audiences, telling the story of a 12-year-old boy "Berke" who uncovers the secret of how to make his wishes come true . She started pre-production in Istanbul. She shot it in Mardin, an ancient Roman town near the Turkish border with Syria. Her film "Make a Wish" Bir Dilek Tut is a semi-finalist at Flickers’ Rhode Island International Film Festival (RIIFF).

== Filmography ==
=== Feature films ===
Year	Title	Director	Producer	Writer	Notes
2022	Make A Wish	Yes	Yes	Yes	Co-written with Avni Tuna Dilligil Starring Altan Erkekli; Vildan Atasever; İhsan Berk AydınCinematographer Joan Bordera

=== Short films ===
Year	Title	Director	Writer	Notes
1998	La Solitude	Yes	Yes	Produced. Starring Zoe Coussoneau.
2003	Unsatisfaction	Yes	Yes	Starring Helen Le Bohec Cinematographer Philipp Blaubach
2005	La Peur	Yes	Yes	Starring Karina BeutheAudrey Caillaud, Cinematographer Jean Poisson
2006	La Muette	Yes	Yes	Starring Zoe Duchesne& Jean Christophe Gra Cinematographer Vincent Mathias

=== Commercials ===
Year	Title	Director	Writer	Company	Notes
2004	Group Saur	Yes	Yes	Group Saur	Note shot in Cape Town
2006	Yes	Yes	Chanel	Starring Zoe Duchesne Cinematographer Jean Poisson	
2007	CK	Yes	CK	Starring Zoe Duchesne, Romulo Pires	
2007	Lux Soap]	Yes		Lux Soap	Vincent Mathias
2008	Mini BMW	Yes	Yes	Mini BMW	Starring Meta Akkus & Jan Schunke
2015	Pasabahce Omnia	Yes	Yes	Pasabahce	
