= Entre Violence et Violon =

Entre violence et violon

Studio album by Johnny Hallyday
- Released: June 24, 1983
- Recorded: 1983
- Genre: Pop, rock
- Label: Philips Records, Universal Music
- Producer: Pierre Billon

Johnny Hallyday chronology
Johnny au Bois de Boulogne (1982)	Entre violence et violon (1983)	Nashville en direct (1984)

Singles from Entre Violince et Violin
- 1. "Entre Violence et Violon" Released: October 1983; 2. "Signe extérieur de richesse" Released: October 1983; 3. "Les Vautours..."

Entre violence et violon is a 1983 album by French singer Johnny Hallyday. The same year, it achieved Gold status for over 100,000 units sold.

== Track listing ==
1. Entre violence et violon 4:56
2. Les scellés sur ma vie 3:40
3. Laisse-moi une chance 4:51
4. Marie Marie 3:17
5. Pour ceux qui s'aime 2:30
6. L'amour violent 3:23
7. Quand un homme devient fou 6:17
8. Mes souvenirs, mes seize ans 4:16
9. La fille d'en face 4:54
10. Signes extérieurs de richesse 4:47

Source: Entre Violence et Violon track listing
