= Ça ne change pas un homme (song) =

1991 single by Johnny Hallyday

Single by Johnny Hallyday

from the album Ça ne change pas un homme
- Language: French
- English title: It doesn't change a man
- Released: November 1991
- Recorded: 1991
- Genre: Rock, chanson
- Length: 4:13
- Label: Philips
- Composer: Art Mengo
- Lyricist: Patrice Guirao
- Producer: Mick Lanaro

Johnny Hallyday singles chronology
"Diego libre dans sa tête" (1991)	"Ça ne change pas un homme" (1991)	"Dans un an dans un jour" (1992)

"Ça ne change pas un homme" ("It doesn't change a man") is a 1991 rock song recorded by French singer Johnny Hallyday. Written by Patrice Guirao with a music composed by Art Mengo, it was the first single from his 37th studio album Ça ne change pas un homme, on which it appears as the sixth track, and was released in November 1991. It achieved success in France where it was a top ten hit. A live version was recorded in 1992 for the album Bercy 92.

== Chart performance ==
In France, "Ça ne change pas un homme" debuted at number 22 on the chart edition of 7 December 1991, which was the highest debut that week, entered the top ten two weeks later, peaked at number seven in its sixth week, and remained for a total of five weeks in the top ten and 11 weeks in the top 50. On the Eurochart Hot 100 Singles, it started at number 94 on 21 December 1991, reached a peak of number 44 in its fourth week, and appeared on the chart for seven weeks.

== Track listings ==
- 7" single
1. "Ça ne change pas un homme" (edit) — 4:13
2. "Tout pour te déplaire 'Some Things Never Change'" — 4:09
- Cassette
1. "Ça ne change pas un homme" (edit) — 4:13
2. "Tout pour te déplaire 'Some Things Never Change'" — 4:09
- CD maxi
1. "Ça ne change pas un homme" (edit) — 4:13
2. "Tout pour te déplaire 'Some Things Never Change'" — 4:09
3. "Ça ne change pas un homme" (album version) — 4:51

== Personnel ==
- Photography — Thierry Rajic
- Producer — Mick Lanaro
- Sleeve — Antonietti, Pascault & Associés

== Charts ==
Chart (1991–1992)	Peak position
Europe (Eurochart Hot 100)	44
France (Airplay Chart [AM Stations])	2
France (SNEP)	7

== Release history ==
Country	Date	Format	Label
France	1991	7" single	Philips
France	1991	CD maxi	Philips
France	1991	Cassette	Philips
