= Stach Stach =

Single by Bratisla Boys

from the album Anthologigi
- B-side: "Remix"
- Released: April 2002
- Recorded: 2002
- Genre: Pop, ska
- Length: 3:14
- Label: Jam Block; Sony Music
- Songwriters: Dvorjak, Olaff, Piotr

Bratisla Boys singles chronology
"Stach Stach" (2002)	"It's Kyz My Life" (2002)

Audio sample
- Bratisla Boys - "Stach Stach": file; help

"Stach Stach" is a 2002 song recorded by Michael Youn and his band Bratisla Boys. This humoristic song was released as first single from the album Anthologigi, in April 2002. Entirely composed of onomatopoeics and meaningless words parodying slavic languages on a repetitive music, the song became a hit, topping the chart in France for almost four months.

== Song information ==
The song was first performed as a parody of the Eurovision contest in the French TV show Morning Live, hosted by Michaël Youn and his two friends and broadcast on M6. As it was well received by the public, it was recorded and eventually released as a single, and was sponsored by Fun Radio.

According to the band's fictitious biography, the song is supposed to having been recorded in a submarine while it was 300 metres deep. Dvorjak, Olaff and Piotr, who are credited as writers and composers of the song, are actually the singers under a pseudonym. All three appear displaying their bare buttocks on the back of the single cover.

In France, the single charted for 38 weeks on the chart (top 100) from 20 April 2002. It topped the chart for ten weeks, 21 weeks in the top ten and 31 weeks in the top 50. Certified Diamond, the song is the eighth best-selling single of the 21st century in France, with 797,000 units sold.

== Track listings ==
- CD single
1. "Stach Stach" (edit long) — 3:14
2. "Stach Stach" (edit radio) — 1:24
3. "Stach Stach" (instrumental) — 3:14
4. "Bratisla Theme" — 3:38
- 12" maxi
1. "Stach Stach" (edit long) — 3:14
2. "Stach Stach" (edit radio) — 1:24
3. "Stach Stach" (instrumental) — 3:14
4. "Bratisla Theme" — 3:38
- CD single - Promo
1. "Stach Stach" (edit long) — 3:14
2. "Stach Stach" (edit radio 1) — 1:45
3. "Bratisla anthem" — 3:38

== Credits ==
- Written by Dvorjak, Olaff and Piotr
- Artwork by Markus Dinocerak
- Photography by S. Mickaïlof
- "Bratisla anthem" : mixed by Tomislav Arroyovski, produced by Play Mo' Bitch, scratches by Nikolaï

== Charts ==
=== Weekly charts ===
Chart (2002)	Peak position
Belgian (Wallonia) Singles Chart	3
French SNEP Singles Chart	1
Swiss Singles Chart	2

=== Year-end charts ===
Chart (2002)	Position
Belgian (Wallonia) Singles Chart	20
Europe (Eurochart Hot 100)	14
French Singles Chart	2
Swiss Singles Chart	49

== Certifications ==
Region	Certification	Certified units/sales
France (SNEP)	Diamond	750,000^{*}
^{*} Sales figures based on certification alone.
