= Ça ne change pas un homme =

Studio album by Johnny Hallyday
- Released: December 1991
- Recorded: 1991
- Genre: Pop, rock
- Label: Phonogram
- Producer: Bibi Green, Caroline Molko

Johnny Hallyday chronology
Dans la chaleur de Bercy (1990)	Ça ne change pas un homme (1991)	Bercy 92 (1992)

Singles from Rough Town
- 1. "Ça ne change pas un homme" Released: December 1991; 2. "Dans un an ou un jour" Released: March 1992; 3. "Et puis je sais" Released: June 1992; 4. "True to You" Released: September 1992

Ça ne change pas un homme ("It doesn't change a man") is a 1991 album recorded by French singer Johnny Hallyday. It was in late December 1991 and achieved success in France, where it debuted at a peak at #3 on the charts on January 1, 1992, and totalled 43 weeks on the chart (top 50). It provided four singles in France, including two top ten hits: "Ça ne change pas un homme" (#7), "Dans un an ou un jour" (#7), "Et puis je sais" (#16) and "True to You" (#18).

The music of "Dans un an ou un jour" was signed by Mort Shuman, a famous artist who was close to Elvis Presley. After Shuman's death on November 3, 1991, Hallyday put the recording tape of the song on his grave during the funeral. "Pour exister" and "Et puis je sais" was written by Patrick Bruel and these songs were covered live by Bruel a few years later at a concert in 1995 ("Pour exister"), then as duet with Hallyday during another concert, in 2000 ("Et puis je sais").

== Track listing ==
No.	Title	Writer(s)	Length
1.	"Tout pour te déplaire"	Bryan Adams, Jim Vallance	4:11
2.	"Roxy Baby"	Piranha, Jean-Pierre "Zaak" Alcouffé	3:24
3.	"Dans un an ou un jour"	Ysa Shandy, Mort Shuman	5:08
4.	"Ce Jeu-là"	Jacques Cardona, Ysa Shandy	4:42
5.	"Le nom que tu portes"	Jon Bon Jovi, Richie Sambora	4:32
6.	"Ça ne change pas un homme"	Patrice Guirao, Art Mengo	4:53
7.	"Cadillac Man"	Bon Jovi, Richie Sambora	6:04
8.	"Et puis je sais"	Patrick Bruel	3:58
9.	"True to You"	Chris Rea	4:22
10.	"Amour facile"	Thunder	4:12
11.	"La guitare fait mal"	Joe Dassin, Claude Lemesle	4:25
12.	"Une journée"	Étienne Roda-Gil, Tony Joe White	4:43
13.	"Pour exister"	Patrick Bruel	5:06
14.	"Tien an Men"	Jacques Cardona, Ysa Shandy	4:40

Source : Allmusic.

== Releases ==
Date	Label	Country	Format	Catalog
1991	Phonogram	Belgium, France, Switzerland	CD	510850
2000	Philips	Belgium, France, Switzerland	CD	512865

== Charts ==
Chart (1991)	Peak position
French SNEP Albums Chart	3
