= Hollywood (Johnny Hallyday album) =

Studio album by Johnny Hallyday
- Released: January 30, 1979
- Recorded: 1978
- Studio: Hollywood Sound Recorders; Record Plant, Los Angeles, California
- Genre: Pop, rock
- Label: Philips, Universal Music
- Producer: Eddie Vartan, Robert Margouleff

Johnny Hallyday chronology
Solitudes à Deux (1978)	Hollywood (1979)	À Partir de Maintenant (1980)

Singles from Hollywood
- 1. "Le Bon vieux temps du Rock'n' roll" Released: February 17, 1979

Hollywood is an album of the French singer Johnny Hallyday album. It was recorded and mixed by Robert Margouleff.

== Track listing ==
1. Le Bon Temps du rock'n'roll ("Old Time Rock and Roll")
2. Tout m'enchaîne ("Crying Shame")
3. Tu n'es pas la seul fille au monde ("You Are the Only One I Ever Needed")
4. Le Coeur comme une montagne ("Isn't It Time")
5. Ce que tu as fait de moi
6. Fais ce que je dis pas ce que je fais
7. Dommage ("I Need You So Badly")
8. Comme un voleur ("You're Gonna Get What's Coming")
9. Du même coté de la rivière
10. T'as le bonjour de l'amour ("You Can Get It If You Really Want")

Source: À Partir de Maintenant track listing
