= La Peur (2005 film) =

2005 film

- Directed by: Meta Akkus
- Written by: Meta Akkus
- Produced by: Gilles Pottiee Sperry; Meta Akkus; Alexandre Charlet
- Starring: Karina Beuthe; Audrey Caillaud
- Cinematography: Jean Poisson
- Release date: 2005
- Running time: 5:55 minutes
- Country: France
- Language: French

La Peur is a short film directed by Meta Akkus about Claudia (Karina Beuthe Orr) facing her traumatic past by going back to her deserted childhood house, after her parents death.

La Peur is a short film directed by Meta Akkus, about a Claudia facing her traumatic memories by going back to her childhood home after her parents death, she needs to stay in the house, laying on her room she start having nightmares. When she falls asleep, she seems like going to that same event, seeing someone or something entering her room when she is only 8 years old. She fights with her desire to fall asleep to avoid reliving this event. Finally she realizes that when she is holding something in her hand while falling asleep, the child version of her in her nightmare holds the same object. She decide to fall asleep with her gun, when the little Claudia wakes up in the nightmare, she has the gun to kill her fear, or whatever enters the room is left to the audience imagination.

La Peur showcased at the international short film festival Clement-Ferrand

This short film shown in the 5th international izmir short film festival November 2004.

Jean Poisson joins Akkus as the cinematographer, with whom Akkus previously teamed up on Chanel and Ck commercials. Shot in 35mm in Paris.

== Cast ==
- Karina Beuthe as adult Claudia
- Audrey Caillaud as child Claudia
