= Le Cœur d'un homme =

Le Cœur d'un homme qui

Studio album by Johnny Hallyday
- Released: November 12, 2007
- Recorded: France, 2007
- Genre: Rock
- Labels: WEA, Warner Music
- Producer: Yvan Cassar

Johnny Hallyday chronology
La Cigale (12 - 17 décembre 2006) (2007)	Le Cœur d'un homme qui (2007)	Ça ne finira jamais (2008)

Singles from Le Cœur d'un homme
- 1. "Always" Released: November 2, 2007

Le Cœur d'un homme is an album by the French singer Johnny Hallyday. It was released on November 12, 2007, and achieved huge success in France and Belgium (Wallonia). It was led by the single "Always", a number 2 hit in France, and contains a cover version of Francis Cabrel's 1989 single "Sarbacane". French actor Bruno Putzulu wrote one song of the album. The final track of the album, "I Am the Blues", co-written by U2's lead singer Bono, is a rare example of a Hallyday song in English.

== Track listing ==
1. "Monument Valley" (Christian Lejalé, Yvan Cassar - Laurent Vernerey) — 4:01
2. "Etre un homme" (Marie-Laure Douce, Yvan Cassar - Laurent Vernerey) — 4:05
3. "Always" (Didier Golemanas - Alain Goldstein, Didier Golemanas) — 3:02
4. "Chavirer les foules" (Michel Mallory) — 4:13
5. "Vous madame" (Jacques Veneruso) — 4:48
6. "Je reviendrai dans tes bras" (Jean Fauque, Fred Blondin) — 4:29
7. "Que restera-t-il ?" (Didier Golemanas) — 3:53
8. "T'aimer si mal" (Marc Lévy, Yvan Cassar) (featuring Taj Mahal) — 4:43
9. "Ma vie" (Bruno Putzulu, Yvan Cassar - Laurent Vernerey) — 4:17
10. "Laquelle de toi" (Bernard Droguet, Fred Blondin) — 3:33
11. "Sarbacane" (Francis Cabrel) — 4:16
12. "Ce que j'ai fait de ma vie" (Bernie Taupin - French adaptation : Lionel Florence, Jim Cregan) — 5:16
13. "I Am the Blues" (Bono, Simon Carmody) — 4:23

Source : Allmusic.

== Personnel ==
- Denis Benarrosch - drums, percussion
- Doyle Bramhall II - electric guitar, slide guitar
- Yvan Cassar - piano, organ
- Eric Chevalier - programming
- Geoff Dugmore - drums, percussion
- Claude Engel - acoustic guitar, electric guitar, slide guitar
- Mark Goldenberg - acoustic guitar, baritone guitar
- Christophe Guiot - violone
- James Harman - harmonica
- Freddy Koella - acoustic guitar, electric guitar, slide guitar, resonator guitar
- Abraham Laboriel, Sr. - drums, percussion
- Greg Leisz - lap steel guitar
- Robin LeMesurier - acoustic guitar, electric guitar)
- Taj Mahal - guitar
- Keb' Mo' - resonator guitar
- Paul Personne - electric guitar
- Brian Ray - electric guitar
- Eric Sauviat - acoustic guitar, electric guitar, slide guitar, baritone guitar, resonator guitar
- Greg Szlapczynski - harmonica
- Laurent Vernerey - double bass
- Tony Joe White - electric guitar

== Releases ==
Date	Label	Country	Format	Catalog
November 12, 2007	WEA	Belgium, France, Switzerland	CD	46981083
November 12, 2007	Warner Music	Belgium, France, Switzerland	CD + DVD	46981069
November 12, 2007	Warner Music	Belgium, France, Switzerland	CD + DVD	46979035
November 16, 2007	Warner Music	Belgium, France, Switzerland	Collector CD	42465822
November 16, 2007	Warner Music	Belgium, France, Switzerland	2 CD	46981052
February 29, 2008	Warner Music	Belgium, France, Switzerland	CD + DVD	42708622

== Charts ==
=== Weekly charts ===
Chart (2007/08)	Peak position
Belgian (Wallonia) Albums Chart	1
French SNEP Albums Chart	1
Swiss Albums Chart	4

=== Year-end charts ===
Chart (2007)	Position
Belgian (Wallonia) Albums Chart	18
French Albums Chart	8
Swiss Albums Chart	61
Chart (2008)	Position
Belgian (Wallonia) Albums Chart	TBA
French Albums Chart	76

== Certifications and sales ==
Certifications for Le Cœur d'un homme
Region	Certification	Certified units/sales
Belgium (BRMA)	Gold	15,000^{*}
France (SNEP)	2× Platinum	400,000^{*}
Switzerland (IFPI Switzerland)	Gold	15,000^{^}
^{*} Sales figures based on certification alone.^{^} Shipments figures based on certification alone.
