= Solitudes à deux =

Solitude à deux

Studio album by Johnny Hallyday
- Released: June 1978
- Recorded: 1978
- Studio: Studio 92, Paris
- Genres: Pop, rock
- Label: Philips
- Producer: Eddie Vartan

Johnny Hallyday chronology
Hamlet (1977)	Solitude à deux (1978)	Hollywood (1979)

Singles from Solitude à Deux
- 1. "Revoilà ma solitude" Released: October 18, 1978

Solitude à deux is an album by the French singer Johnny Hallyday.

== Track listing ==
1. "Elle m'oublie" (Didier Barbelivien)
2. "Salut Charlie" (Hallyday, Michel Mallory)
3. "La Fille du square" (Pascal Lefèbvre, Franck Langolff)
4. "Cet homme que voilà" (Paolo Amerigo Cassella, Marco Luberti, Riccardo Cocciantre; French lyrics by Pierre Delanoë)
5. "Revoilà ma solitude" (Michel Mallory, Kenny Rogers)
6. "La Première Pierre" (Michel Mallory, Tim Hinkley)
7. "Va te cacher" (Michel Mallory, Erick Bamy)
8. "Lolita" (Michel Mallory, Kim Morrison)
9. "Un coup pour rien" (Michel Mallory, Erick Bamy)
10. "Le Pétrole" (Michel Mallory)
11. "Je vous la donne" (John Goodison, Phil Wainman; adapted by Michel Mallory)

Source: Solitude à deux track listing

== Critical reception ==
The album caught the attention of critics on both sides of the Atlantic; a francophone newspaper from New Brunswick, Canada explained that the album was proof of Halliday's continued success (compared to other musicians who rise to fame and are quickly forgotten), as he has re-focused his career to "adapt to new trends and to meet new demands of popular music" . The album was in the style of rhythmic songs from the 1950s. A Swiss news paper said it was a "quality album", noting " The lyrics, while they are not masterpieces, have a certain richness; the music is pleasant, remarkably highlighted by perfect orchestration; the interpretation is full of nuances and very lively." They opined that the A-side of the album was more lively, while the B-side was more akin to what Hallyday's fans expect from him in concert. Songs from this album were re-mastered as part of a Hallyday commemorative album issued in 2018 for what would have been his 75th birthday.
