= La Peur (album) =

Studio album by Johnny Hallyday
- Released: September 7, 1982
- Recorded: 1982
- Studio: Studio Des Dames, Paris
- Genre: Pop, rock
- Label: Philips, Universal Music
- Producer: Pierre Billon

Johnny Hallyday chronology
Johnny au Bois de Boulogne (1982)	La Peur (1982)	Entre Violence et Violon (1983)

La Peur is an album of the French singer Johnny Hallyday.

== Track listing ==
1. Le survivant
2. La peur
3. Veau d'or vaudou
4. Je n'en suis plus capable
5. Carte postale d'Alabama
6. Je suis victime de l'amour
7. Sans profession
8. Il nous faudra parler d'amour
9. Oublier
10. Faire face
11. Ma voix de révolte

Source:La peur track listing
