= Marie (Johnny Hallyday song) =

Single by Johnny Hallyday

from the album À la vie, à la mort !
- B-side: "Dis-le moi"
- Released: October 2002
- Recorded: France, 2002
- Genre: Pop
- Length: 3:58
- Label: Mercury; Universal Music
- Songwriter(s): Gérald De Palmas
- Producer(s): Gérald De Palmas

Johnny Hallyday singles chronology
"Tous ensemble" (2002)	"Marie" (2002)	"Ne reviens pas" (2003)

Music video
- "Marie" on YouTube

"Marie" is a 2002 song recorded by French singer Johnny Hallyday. It was the first single from his album À la vie, à la mort !, and was released in October 2002. Written and produced by Gérald De Palmas, it achieved a huge success in France, topping the singles chart and thus becoming Hallyday's second number-one hit on the modern French SNEP Singles Chart since its establishment in 1984.

The song was performed during Hallyday's 2003 and 2006 tours and was included on his albums Stars France 2003 and Flashback Tour - Palais des Sports 2006.

In France, the single went straight to #2 on 26 October 2002, being blocked for three weeks at this place by Las Ketchup's hit "Aserejé (The Ketchup Song)". It managed to top the chart for three weeks, alterning with Las Ketchup, and totaled 14 weeks in the top ten, 21 weeks in the top 50, and 28 weeks in the top 100. Certified Diamond disc by the SNEP, "Marie" became the ninth best-selling single of the 21st century in France, with 729,000 units sold.

== Track listings ==
CD single

1. "Marie" — 3:58
2. "Dis-le moi" — 4:28

== Certifications ==
Region	Certification	Certified units/sales
Belgium (BRMA)	Platinum	50,000^{*}
France (SNEP)	Diamond	750,000^{*}
^{*} Sales figures based on certification alone.

== Charts ==
=== Weekly charts ===
Chart (2002)	Peak position
Belgian (Wallonia) Singles Chart	2
French SNEP Singles Chart	1
Swiss Singles Chart	7

=== Year-end charts ===
Chart (2002)	Position
Belgian (Wallonia) Singles Chart	16
Europe (Eurochart Hot 100)	94
French Singles Chart	4
Swiss Singles Chart	87
Chart (2003)	Position
Belgian (Wallonia) Singles Chart	71
French Singles Chart	51
