= Lorient, Saint Barthélemy =

Lorient
- Quartier
- The quartier of Lorient, Saint Barthélemy marked 28.
- Coordinates: 17°54′26″N 62°49′14″W
- Country: France
- Overseas collectivity: Saint Barthélemy

Lorient (French: [lɔʁjɑ̃]) is a quartier of Saint Barthélemy in the Caribbean. It is located in the northern part of the island.

Its parish church, the Église Notre-Dame de l'Assomption, Lorient, is dedicated to Our Lady of the Assumption; its parish cemetery contains the grave of Johnny Hallyday.
