= À la vie, à la mort! =

Studio album by Johnny Hallyday
- Released: 4 November 2002
- Recorded: France, 2002
- Genre: Pop rock
- Label: Mercury, Universal Music
- Producer: Pierre Jaconelli, Gérald de Palmas, David Hallyday, Axel Bauer

Johnny Hallyday chronology
Olympia 2000 (2002)	À la vie, à la mort! (2002)	Parc des Princes 2003 (2003)

Singles from À la vie, à la mort
- 1. "Marie" Released: October 2002; 2. "Ne reviens pas" Released: January 2003; 3. "L'Instinct" Released: June 2003; 4. "Je n'ai jamais pleuré" Released: October 2003

À la vie, à la mort! is a 2002 double album recorded by French singer Johnny Hallyday. It was released on 4 November 2002 and achieved huge success in France and Belgium (Wallonia), where it topped the charts, and in Switzerland. It provided four top ten singles in France: "Marie" (#1), "Ne reviens pas" (#8), "L'Instinct" (#9) and "Je n'ai jamais pleuré" (#4). Artists such as Gérald De Palmas, Catherine Lara, Maxime Le Forestier, Patrick Bruel, Hugues Aufray, Stephan Eicher, Axel Bauer and Marc Lavoine participated in the composition of the album.

== Track listing ==
Disc one
No.	Title	Writer(s)	Length
1.	"Entre nous"	Fossey, Nault, Tabrha	4:08
2.	"Dis-le moi"	Blondin	4:28
3.	"Marie"	Gérald De Palmas	3:56
4.	"Ne reviens pas"	Djian, Stephan Eicher	4:58
5.	"J'ai rêvé de nous"	Axel Bauer, Kadid	5:00
6.	"Pense à moi"	Allison, Golemanas	4:20
7.	"Laisse-moi tomber"	Eliez, Catherine Lara, Sanchez	4:16
8.	"Face au monde"	Campanile, Dupont, Manet	3:47
9.	"Personne d'autre"	De Palmas	4:17
10.	"Une femme"	Mallory	4:33
11.	"Ceux qui parlent aux étoiles"	Chemouny, Hallyday	3:32
12.	"Si c'était à refaire"	Hugues Aufray, Delvaux, Gohier	4:48

Disc two
No.	Title	Writer(s)	Length
1.	"L'Instinct"	De Palmas	3:36
2.	"Je n'ai jamais pleuré"	Berger, Esposito, Marc Lavoine	4:07
3.	"M'arrêter là"	Golmanas, Seff	3:27
4.	"Trouve-moi des mots"	Allison, Patrick Bruel	4:10
5.	"Un homme libre"	De Palmas	4:05
6.	"Je me souviens"	Assous	3:39
7.	"Des hommes"	Allison, Golmanas	5:16
8.	"Chanter n'est pas jouer"	Nimier, Rouaud, Workman	4:26
9.	"Elle veut ma vie"	De Palmas, Maxime Le Forestier	3:25
10.	"Arrête le temps"	Hallyday, Mallory	4:01
11.	"Au bord des routes"	Daran, Kiberlain	4:17

== Releases ==
Date	Label	Country	Format	Catalog
November 2002	Universal Music	Belgium, France, Switzerland	Double CD	63406
November 2002	Mercury / Universal	Belgium, France, Switzerland	Double CD	063406
2006	Universal	Belgium, France, Switzerland	Double CD	0770292

== Charts and sales ==
=== Weekly charts ===
Chart (2002–2003)	Peak position
Belgian (Wallonia) Albums Chart	1
French SNEP Albums Chart	1
Swiss Albums Chart	2

=== Year-end charts ===
Chart (2002)	Position
Belgian (Wallonia) Albums Chart	9
French Albums Chart	3
Swiss Albums Chart	48
Chart (2003)	Position
Belgian (Wallonia) Albums Chart	60
French Albums Chart	32

=== Certifications and sales ===
Country	Certification	Date	Certified sales
Belgium	Platinum	8 March 2003	50,000
France	Diamond	30 December 2002	1,000,000
Switzerland	Platinum	2002	40,000
