= Tous ensemble =

Single by Johnny Hallyday
- Language: French
- English title: All together
- B-side: "Instrumental"
- Released: 23 April 2002
- Recorded: France, 2002
- Genre: Pop
- Length: 2:45
- Label: Mercury, Universal Music
- Songwriter(s): Michel Sanchez; Catherine Lara; Adrien Blaise; Thierry Eliez
- Producer(s): Catherine Lara

Johnny Hallyday singles chronology
"On a tous besoin d'amour" (2001)	"Tous ensemble" (2002)	"Marie" (2002)

"Tous Ensemble" ("All together") is a song recorded in 2002 by French singer Johnny Hallyday. The song was released as a single on 23 April 2002. It was the official anthem of the French football team during the 2002 FIFA World Cup. French singer and songwriter Catherine Lara participated in the writing of the lyrics and produced the song. Michel Sanchez, who was a member of the band Deep Forest, co-wrote the lyrics. The song became the second football anthem to reach the top of the singles chart in France, four years after Ricky Martin's hit "La Copa de la Vida". "Tous Ensemble" became Hallyday's first number-one hit on the modern French SNEP Singles Chart since its establishment in 1984. As of July 2014, it is the 102nd best-selling single of the 21st century in France, with 303,000 units sold.

The current chart was established in 1984. He had over 20 number-1 hits in the 1960s and 1970s.

== Track listings ==
CD single

1. "Tous ensemble" – 2:45
2. "Tous ensemble" (instrumental) – 2:45

== Certifications ==
Region	Certification	Certified units/sales
France (SNEP)	Platinum	500,000^{*}
^{*} Sales figures based on certification alone.

== Charts ==
=== Weekly charts ===
Chart (2002)	Peak position
Belgian (Wallonia) Singles Chart	11
French SNEP Singles Chart	1

=== Year-end charts ===
Chart (2002)	Position
Belgian (Wallonia) Singles Chart	74
Europe (Eurochart Hot 100)	98
French Singles Chart	14
