= Rock'n'Roll Attitude =

Studio album by Johnny Hallyday
- Released: June 26, 1985
- Recorded: December 1984 – April 1985
- Studio: Studio Gang, Paris; Studio Tempo, Montréal
- Genre: Pop, rock
- Length: 41:17
- Label: Philips, Universal Music
- Producer: Michel Berger

Johnny Hallyday chronology
| Johnny au Bois de Boulogne (1983) | Rock'n'Roll Attitude (1985) | Gang (1986) |

Singles from Rock 'n' roll attitude
- 1. "Le Chanteur Abandonné" Released: April 1985; 2. "Rock 'n' roll attitude" Released: September 1985; 3. "Quelque chose de Tennessee" Released: October 1985; 4. "Aimer vivre" Released: February 1986

Rock'n'Roll Attitude is the 34th studio album recorded by French singer Johnny Hallyday. It was released on 26 June 1985.

Rock'n'Roll Attitude was a critical and commercial success, marking the singer's return to the forefront in terms of sales with 472,600 copies in France. It was on the French charts from July 1985 to early 1986, occupying the number two position for four weeks.

== Track listing ==
All tracks composed by Michel Berger

1. "Le Chanteur abandonné"
2. "Qui ose aimer"
3. "Quelque chose de Tennessee"
4. "Équipe de nuit"
5. "La Blouse de l'infirmière"
6. "Rock'n'Roll Attitude"
7. "Seul mais pas solitaire"
8. "Parker, connais pas"
9. "Aimer vivre"
10. "Pendue à mon cou"
