= Cadillac (album) =

Studio album by Johnny Hallyday
- Released: June 1989
- Recorded: 1989
- Genres: Pop, rock
- Labels: Mercury, Universal Music
- Producer: Étienne Roda-Gil

Johnny Hallyday chronology
Johnny à Bercy (1987)	Cadillac (1989)	Dans la chaleur de Bercy (1990)

Singles from Cadillac
- 1. "Mirador" Released: June 1989; 2. "Si j'étais moi" Released: October 1989; 3. "Les Vautours..." Released: February 1990; 4. "Himalaya" Released: June 1990; 5. "Cadillac" Released: September 1990

Cadillac is a 1989 album recorded by French singer Johnny Hallyday. It was released in June 1989 and achieved success in France, where it debuted at #1 for eight consecutive weeks on the SNEP albums chart on July 2, 1989, and totalled 61 weeks in the top 50. It provided five singles in France, including a top three hit: "Mirador" (#3), "Si j'étais moi" (#25), "Les Vautours..." (#30), "Himalaya" (#30) and "Cadillac" (#39). The lyrics were written by Étienne Roda-Gil, who had worked in the 1980s with Vanessa Paradis, and the music was composed and arranged by Jacques Cardona, David Hallyday, Georges Augier, Jean-Pierre Bucolo and Jean-Claude Petit. This album was inspired by Antoine Laumet de La Mothe, sieur de Cadillac, a French who founded Detroit in 1701 and who gave his name to the brand of luxury vehicles.

== Track listing ==
1. "Les Vautours..." (Jacques Cardona, Étienne Roda-Gil) — 4:49
2. "Mirador" (David Hallyday, Roda-Gil) — 4:21
3. "Rien à jeter" (Georges Augier De Moussac, Jean-Pierre Bucolo, Cardona, Roda-Gil) — 3:37
4. "Himalaya" (Augier, Bucolo, Roda-Gil) — 4:43
5. "Possible en moto" (Hallyday, Roda-Gil) — 4:18
6. "Cadillac" (Augier, Bucolo, Roda-Gil) — 4:47
7. "Si j'étais moi" (Bucolo, Roda-Gil) — 4:03
8. "L'Étoile solitaire" (Bucolo, Roda-Gil) — 3:33
9. "C'est du vent" (Augier, Bucolo, Roda-Gil) — 4:12
10. "Testament d'un poète" (Jean-Claude Petit, Roda-Gil) — 1:43

Source : Allmusic.

== Personnel ==
- Produced by Etienne Roda-Gil
- Musical direction: Jean-Pierre Bucolo
- Recording: Jean-Pierre Janiaud and Olivier Do Esperito Santo
- Mixing: Jean-Pierre Janiaud
- Recorded at Studio Gang
- Tony Frank - photography

== Releases ==
Date	Label	Country	Format	Catalog
1989	Universal Music	Belgium, France, Switzerland	CD	?
2000	IMS	Belgium, France, Switzerland	CD	8384972

== Certifications ==
Country	Certification	Date	Sales certified
France	2 x Platinum	1990	600,000

== Charts ==
Chart (1989)	Peak position
French SNEP Albums Chart	1
