= Johnny Hallyday =

French musician and actor (1943–2017)

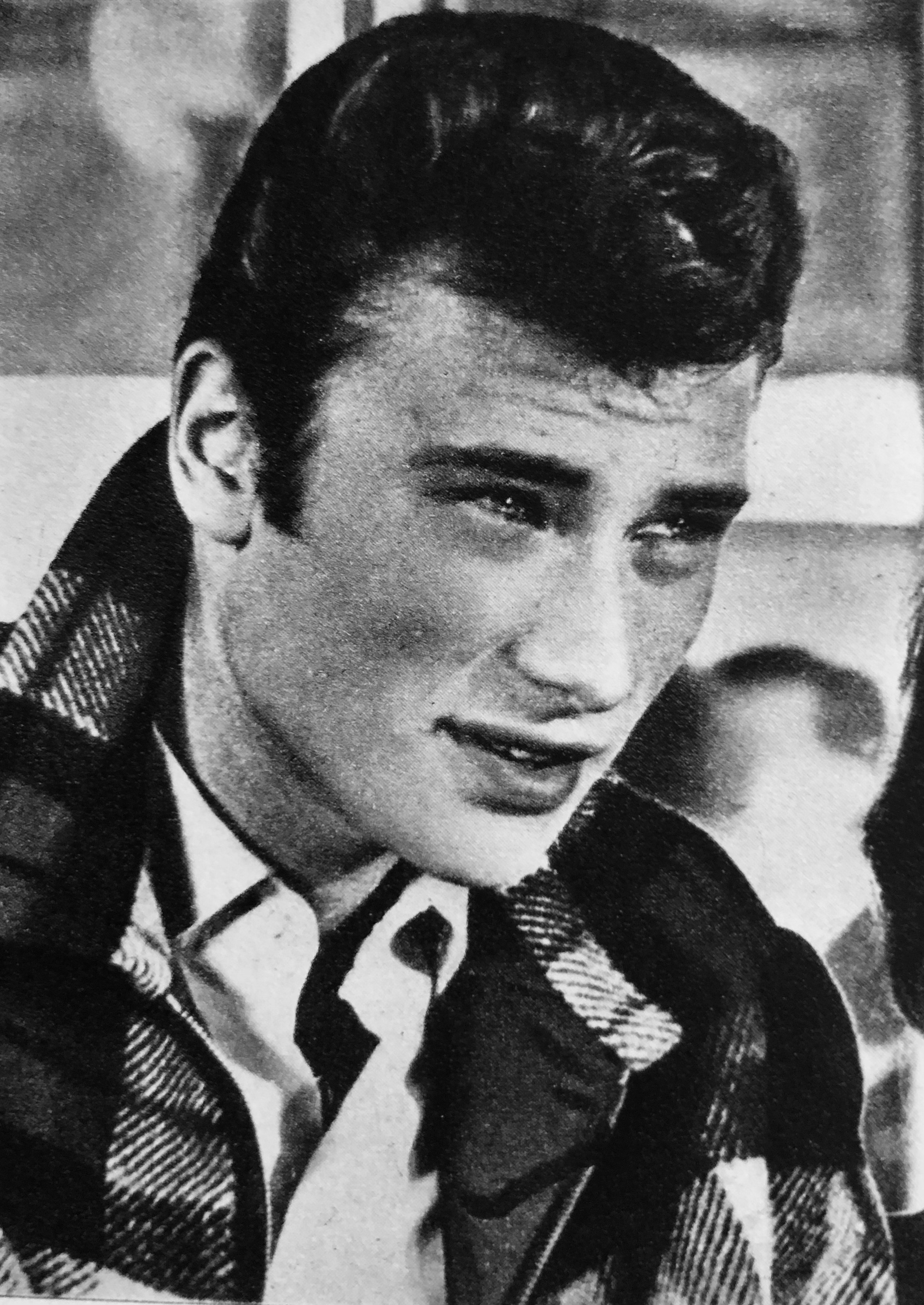
- Hallyday in 1965
- Born: Jean-Philippe Léo Smet; 15 June 1943; Paris, France
- Died: 5 December 2017 (aged 74); Marnes-la-Coquette, France
- Resting place: Lorient, Saint Barthélemy, parish church cemetery
- Occupations: Singer-songwriter; musician; actor
- Spouses: Sylvie Vartan (m. 1965; div. 1980) Babeth Étienne (m. 1981; div. 1982) Adeline Blondieau (m. 1990; div. 1992) (m. 1994; div. 1995) Læticia Boudou (m. 1996)
- Partner: Nathalie Baye (1982–1986)
- Children: 4 (including David and Laura)
- Musical career
- Genres: Rock and roll; pop; yé-yé
- Instruments: Vocals; piano; guitar
- Years active: 1955–2017
- Labels: Vogue; Philips; Warner; Universal
- Website: johnnyhallyday.com

Jean-Philippe Léo Smet (French pronunciation: [ʒɑ̃ filip leo smɛt]; 15 June 1943 – 5 December 2017), better known by his stage name Johnny Hallyday, was a French rock and roll and pop singer and actor, credited with having brought rock and roll to France.

During a career spanning 57 years, Hallyday released 79 albums and sold more than 110 million records worldwide, mainly in the French-speaking world, making him one of the best-selling artists in the world. He had five diamond albums, 40 gold albums, 22 platinum albums and earned ten Victoires de la Musique. He sang an estimated 1,154 songs and performed 540 duets with 187 artists. Credited for his strong voice and his spectacular shows, he sometimes arrived by entering a stadium through the crowd and once by jumping from a helicopter above the Stade de France, where he performed nine times. Among his 3,257 shows completed in 187 tours, the most memorable were at Parc des Princes in 1993, at the Stade de France in 1998, just after France's win in the 1998 FIFA World Cup, as well as at the Eiffel Tower in 2000, which had record-breaking ticket sales for a French artist. A million spectators gathered to see his performance at the Eiffel Tower, with some 10 million watching on television.

Usually working with the best French artists and musicians of his time, Hallyday collaborated with Charles Aznavour, Michel Berger and Jean-Jacques Goldman. Hugely popular in France, he was referred to as simply "Johnny" and seen as a "national monument" and a part of the French cultural legacy. He became a symbol of the Trente Glorieuses, France's prosperous postwar era, after he emerged in 1960, and was a familiar figure to four generations. More than 2,500 magazine covers and 190 books were dedicated to him during his lifetime, making him one of the people most widely covered by the media in France. His death from cancer in 2017 was followed by a "people's tribute", during which a million people attended the funeral procession in Paris and 15 million others watched the ceremony on TV. Hallyday remained relatively unknown outside the French-speaking world, where he was dubbed "the biggest rock star you've never heard of" and introduced as the French version of Elvis Presley.

== Early life ==
Jean-Philippe Smet was born in the 9th arrondissement of Paris on 15 June 1943 to a Belgian father, Léon Smet, and a French mother, Huguette Eugénie Pierrette Clerc. Léon Smet, who worked as a nightclub performer, left his wife and son a few months later. Clerc started a modeling career, which left her with little time to care for her son. Hallyday grew up with his aunt, Hélène Mar, and took his stage name from a cousin-in-law from Oklahoma (Lemoine Ketcham) who performed as Lee Halliday. The latter called Smet "Johnny" and became a father figure, introducing him to American music.

== Career ==
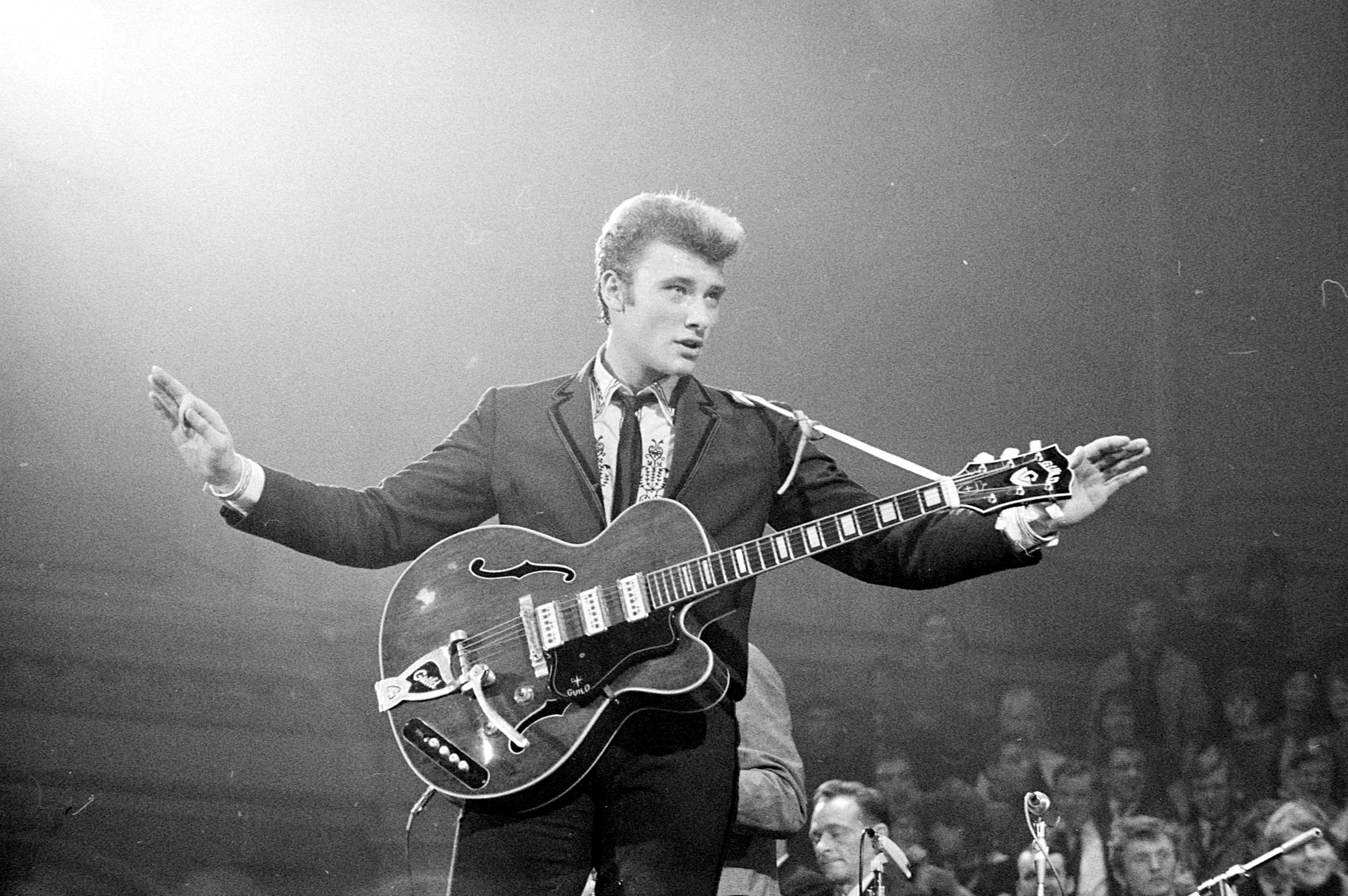
Hallyday performing in 1963

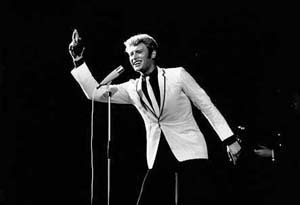
Hallyday performing in 1965

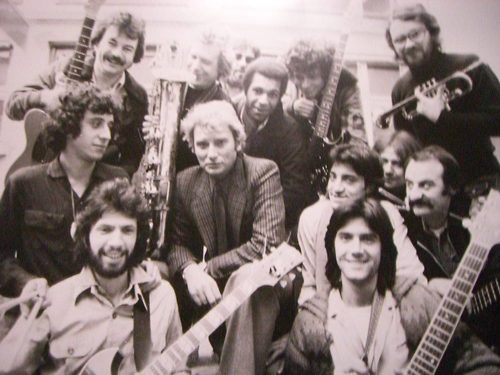
Hallyday with his touring band in 1978

Influenced by Elvis Presley and the 1950s rock n' roll revolution, Hallyday became known for singing rock 'n' roll in French. His debut single, "T'aimer follement" ("Love you madly"), a French adaptation of the controversial 1959 Floyd Robinson hit "Makin' Love" that was also a hit for Dalida the month prior, was released on the Vogue label in March 1960. His debut album, Hello Johnny, was released later that year. In 1961, his French-language cover of "Let's Twist Again", "Viens Danser Le Twist", sold over one million copies and was awarded a gold disc. It topped almost every European chart, although the track did not appear in the UK Singles Chart. He appeared on the American The Ed Sullivan Show with American singing star Connie Francis in a show that was taped at the Moulin Rouge nightclub in Paris. He staged many appearances in the Paris Olympia under the management of Bruno Coquatrix. For their first concert, the Jimi Hendrix Experience opened for Johnny Hallyday in Nancy on 14 October 1966. Film footage from October 1966 exists of Hallyday partying with Hendrix, his manager Chas Chandler and others. He also socialised with Keith Richards and Bob Dylan.

At the end of the 1960s, Hallyday made a string of albums with Foreigner's Mick Jones and Tommy Brown as musical directors, and Big Jim Sullivan, Bobby Graham and Jimmy Page as session musicians. These are Jeune homme, Rivière... Ouvre ton lit (also known as Je suis né dans la rue) and Vie. On Je suis né dans la rue, Hallyday hired both Peter Frampton and the Small Faces and they all play on most of the tracks on the album. Steve Marriott and Ronnie Lane of the Small Faces contributed their compositions "Amen (Bang Bang)", "Reclamation (News Report)", and "Regarde pour moi (What You Will)" to the album. "Amen" is a French-language variation on "That Man", a previously released 1967 Small Faces song played in a heavy rock style. Tensions between the Small Faces during the recording sessions led to Marriott leaving the band and forming Humble Pie with Frampton, and rearranged English language versions of both "Reclamation (News Report)" and "Regarde pour moi (What You Will)" appeared on Humble Pie's debut LP of 1969. Often forgotten is Hallyday's non-LP single and EP track "Que je t'aime" from the same sessions. By 1969 alone, his record sales exceeded twelve million units.

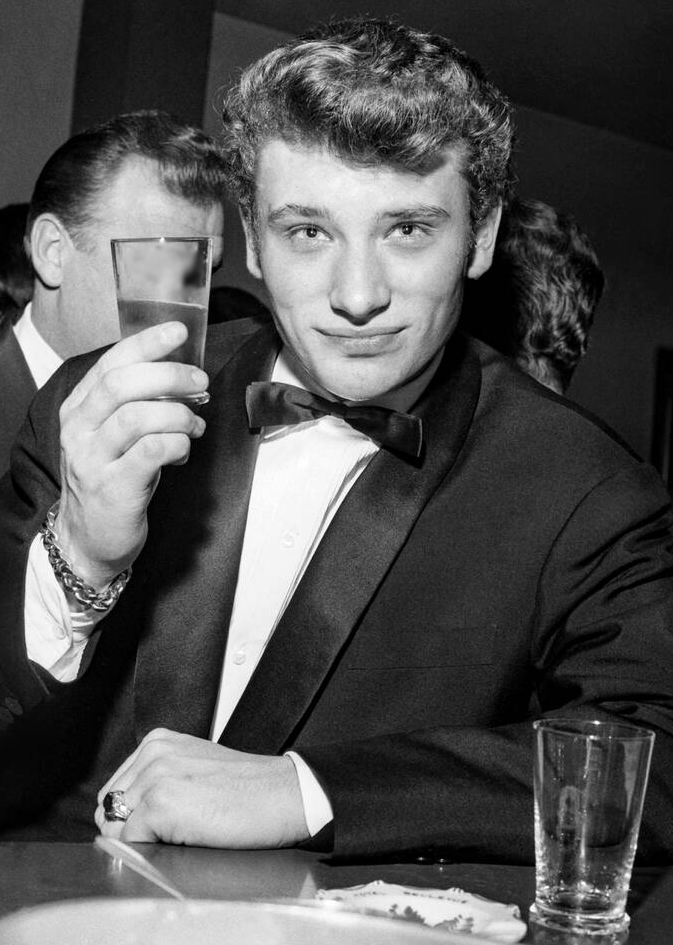
Hallyday in Italy in 1962

One of Hallyday's later concerts, 100% Johnny: Live à la tour Eiffel in 2000, attracted an audience of 500,000 and 9.5 million television viewers (the show was broadcast live on French TV). In December 2005, Hallyday had his third number-one single on the French SNEP singles chart since its establishment in 1984, "Mon plus beau Noël" (after "Tous ensemble" and "Marie"), dedicated to his adopted daughter Jade. Shortly before announcing his retirement from touring in 2007, he released a blues-flavored album, Le Cœur d'un homme. In addition to the lead single "Always", Le Cœur d'un homme features "T'aimer si mal", a duet with blues musician Taj Mahal and "I Am the Blues", an English-language song (uncharacteristically for Hallyday) written by U2's lead singer Bono. His next album, Ça ne finira jamais, released in 2008, another No. 1 on the French album chart, and its lead single, "Ça n'finira jamais", also reached No. 1. Hallyday's album Tour 66: Stade de France 2009 was a live set recorded at Stade de France during his farewell tour. In 2011 Hallyday released album Jamais seul, recorded with Matthieu Chedid, and started touring again. In 2012 he gave concerts in different countries, including Russia, and released the album L'Attente. Later Hallyday released two live albums, On Stage and Born Rocker Tour (a recording of his 70th anniversary concerts in Bercy and Theatre de Paris). Albums named Rester Vivant and De L'Amour were released in 2014 and 2015 respectively. In 2015–2016 Hallyday had the Rester Vivant Tour. A concert in Brussels was released as a live album in 2016.

== Personal life ==
=== Marriages and children ===
Hallyday was married five times, including twice to the same woman, with the first four marriages ending in divorce. His last marriage was his longest, lasting twenty-one years.

His first marriage was to the popular French singer Sylvie Vartan; it lasted fifteen years, from 1965 until 1980. Their son, David, was born in 1966. His second marriage to Babeth Étienne was his shortest, lasting 65 days. Hallyday had a four-year relationship with French actress Nathalie Baye. Their daughter, Laura, was born in 1983. His third and fourth marriages were to the same woman, Adeline Blondieau, from 1990 to 1992, and from 1994 to 1995. Officiated by Nicolas Sarkozy, his fifth and last marriage was to Læticia Boudou from 1996 until his death. The couple adopted two girls from Vietnam, in 2004 and 2008.

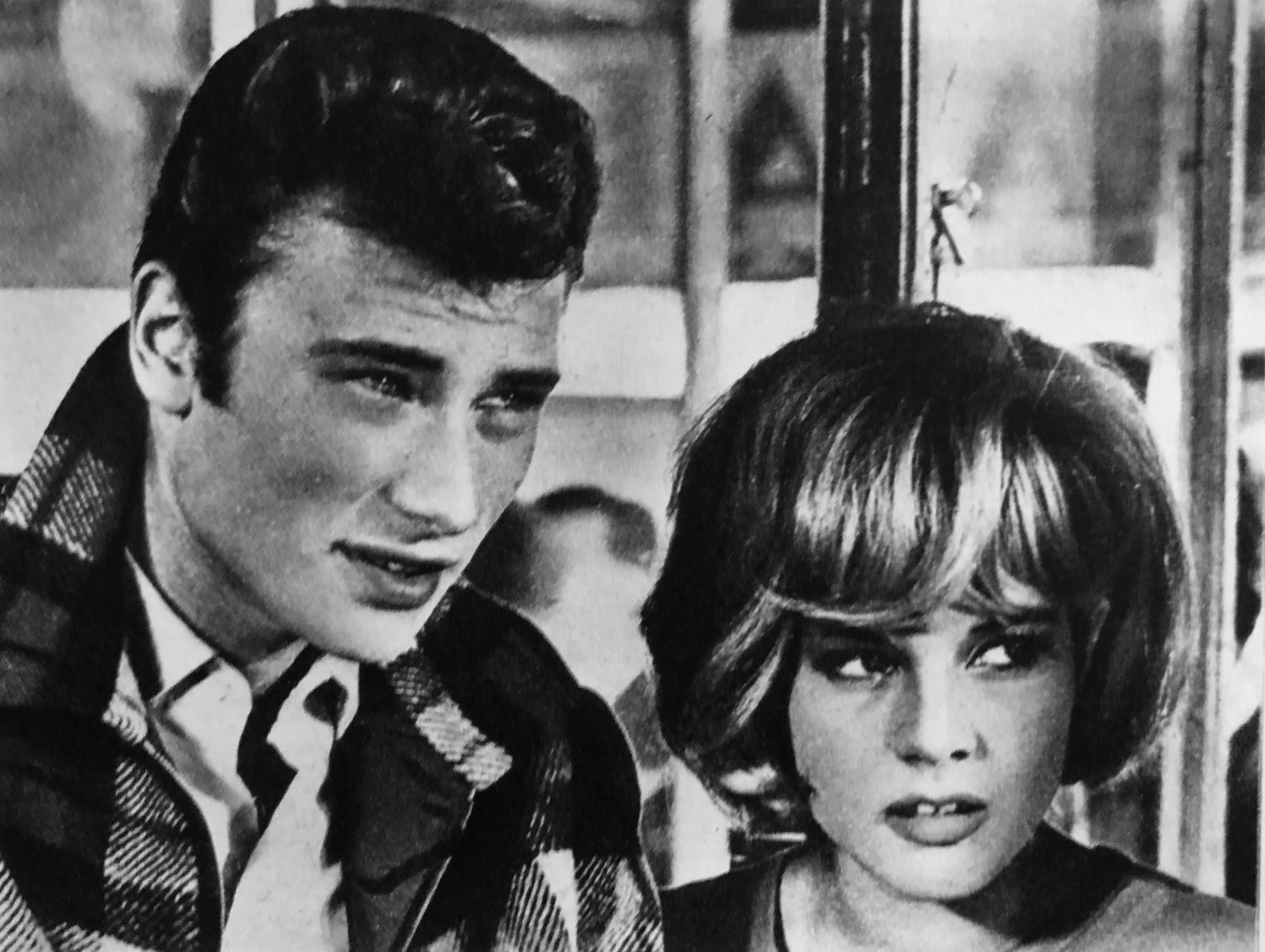
Hallyday with his first wife, Sylvie Vartan, in 1965.

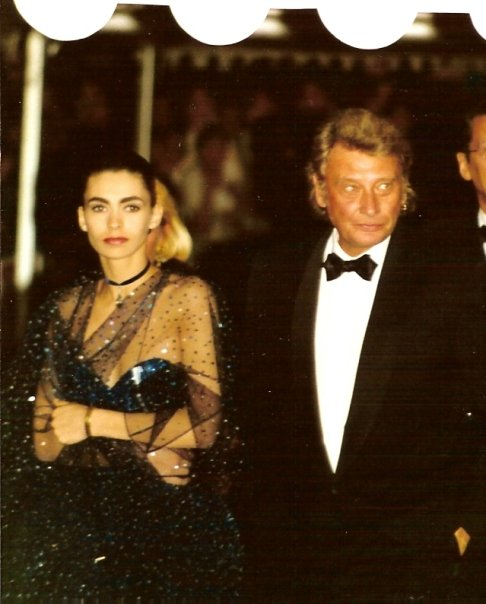
Hallyday with his third wife, Adeline Blondieau, at the 1992 Cannes Film Festival.

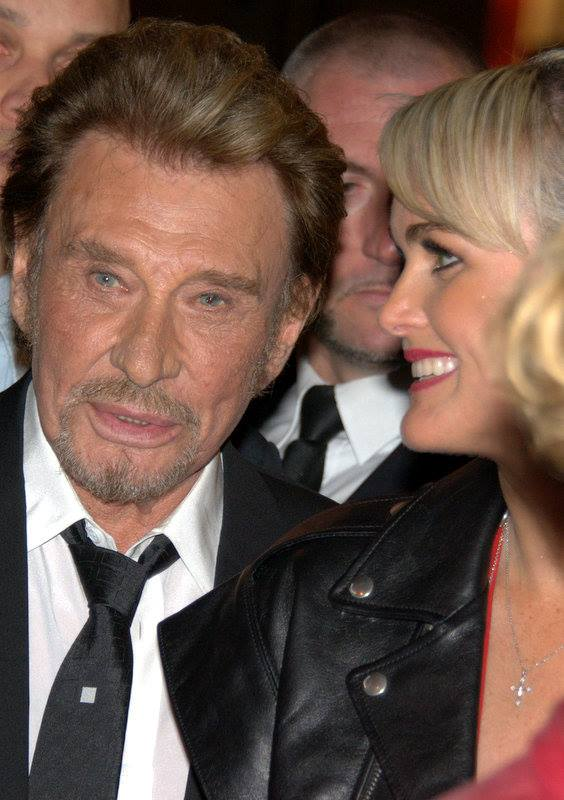
Hallyday with his fourth and last wife, Læticia Boudou, at the Mamers premiere of Salaud, on t'aime in 2014.

=== Residence ===
Hallyday, who resided in Los Angeles, owned a chalet in the Swiss town of Gstaad from 2006 to 2015 to avoid the high tax rate imposed by the French government. Hallyday said that he would have moved his residency back to France if it changed its tax laws. In January 2014, Hallyday said that his current residence was in the United States after an investigation by a Swiss journalist showed that Hallyday did not spend enough time in Gstaad to qualify as a resident. One of his favourite leisure activities was riding his Harley-Davidson on long trips through the California desert, staying in small motels along the way.

=== Illness and death ===
In July 2009, Hallyday was diagnosed with colon cancer, and underwent surgery. On 26 November 2009, Hallyday underwent surgery in Paris to repair a herniated disc. He suffered complications and was admitted to Cedars-Sinai Medical Center in Los Angeles. Doctors announced that they had put Hallyday into a medically induced coma so they could repair lesions that had formed as a result of the surgery, and to relieve his pain. On 17 December 2009, Hallyday and his wife started legal proceedings against Stéphane Delajoux, the doctor who had performed the original surgery. The conflict was resolved in February 2012 following Delajoux's vindication by medical investigators.

Hallyday died of lung cancer at 10:10 pm on 5 December 2017 in Marnes-la-Coquette, near Paris, at the age of 74. French President Emmanuel Macron paid tribute, saying he "transcended generations and is etched in the memory of the French people". On 9 December, his funeral was held in Paris; thousands lined the Champs-Élysées as his body was taken to the Madeleine Church. The service was attended by Macron and two of his predecessors.

He was buried on the French Caribbean island of Saint Barthélemy in the cemetery of Lorient parish church (Église de Lorient) on 11 December 2017.

In February 2018, his two oldest children, David and Laura, announced that they were contesting his will, which left his entire estate to his last wife, Læticia, and their two adopted children. The will had been drafted in the US, and French attorneys for David and Laura contended that this violated French law, which specifically prevents children from being disinherited.

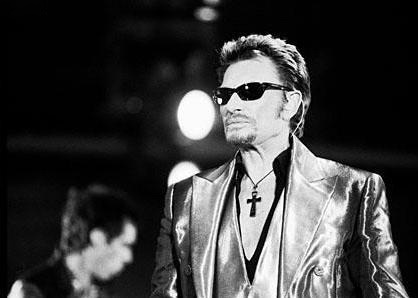
Hallyday performing in Villeneuve-d'Ascq in 2003

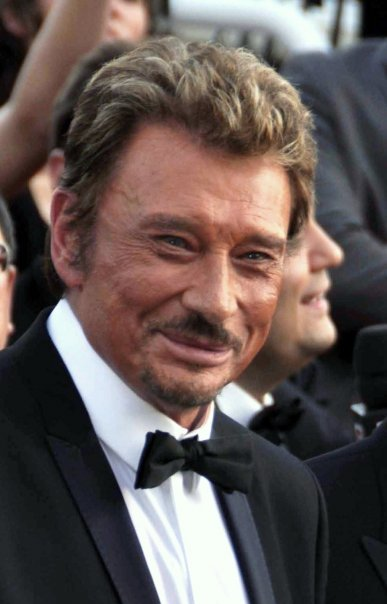
Hallyday at the 2009 Cannes Film Festival

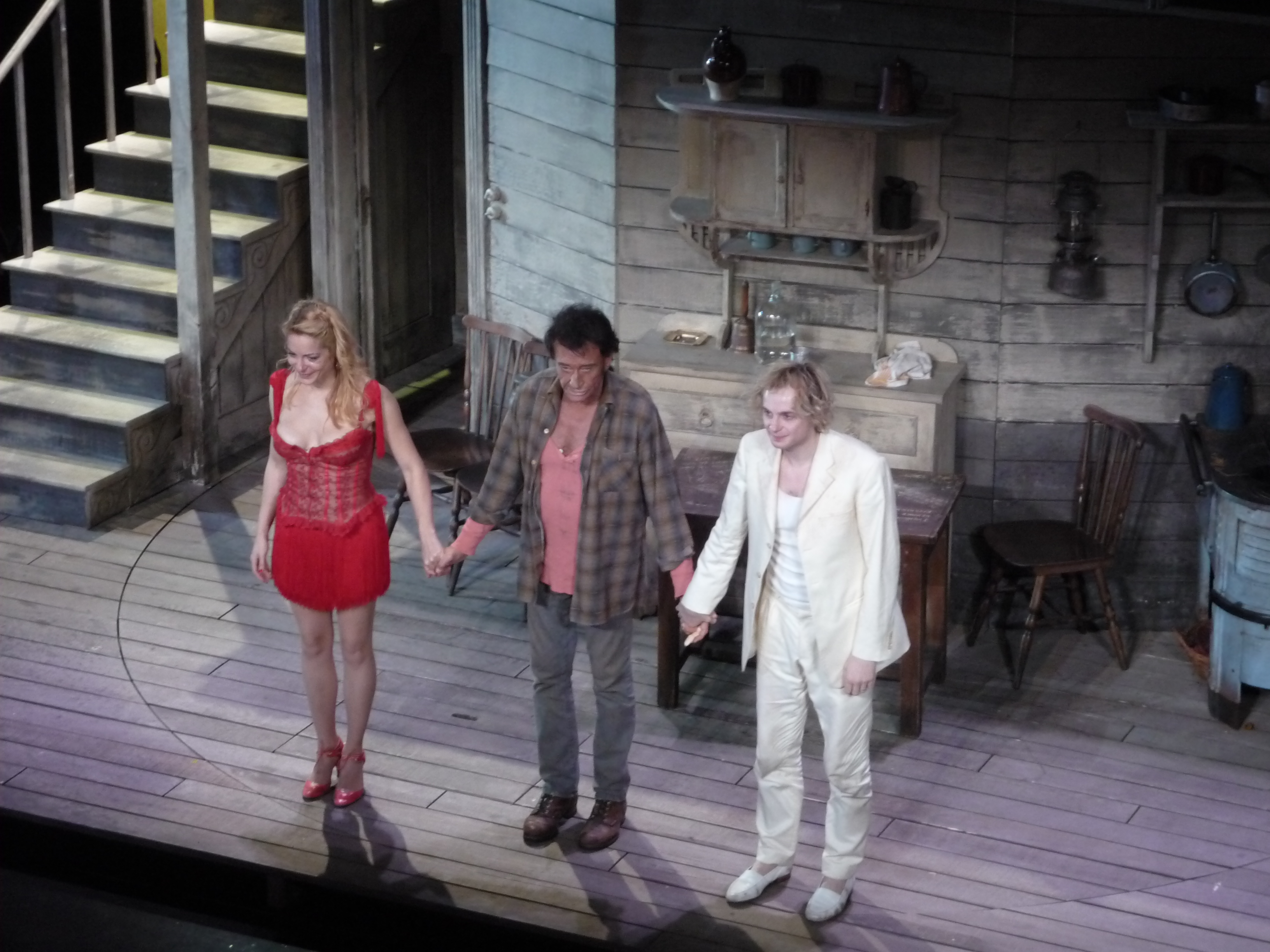
Hallyday with Audrey Dana and Julien Cottereau in Le Paradis sur terre at the Édouard VII theater in 2011

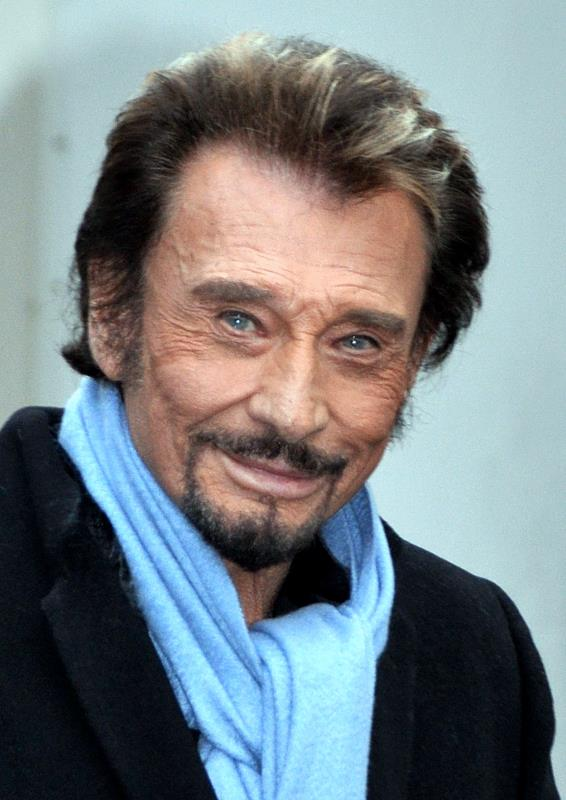
Hallyday in 2012

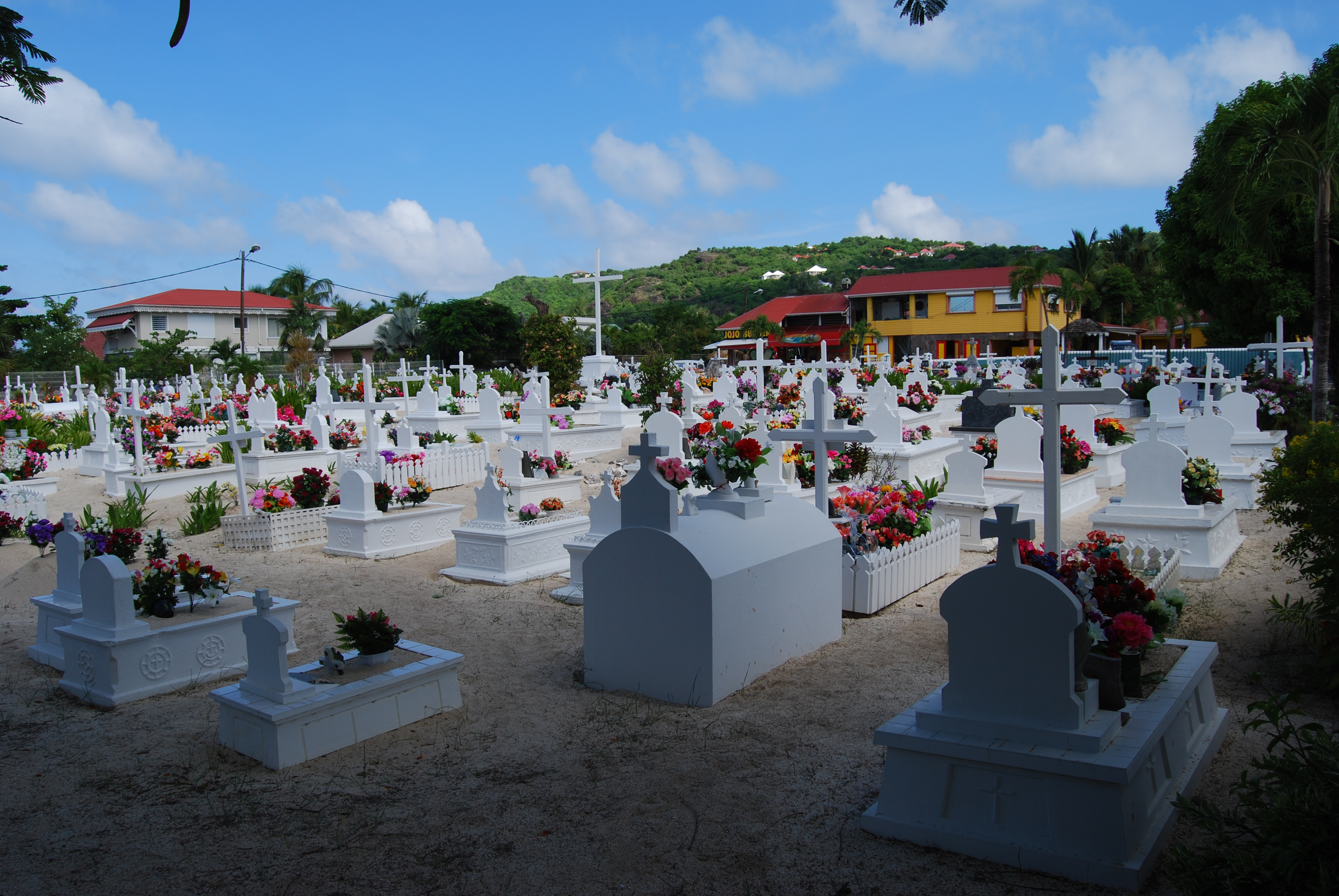
The parish cemetery of Lorient, Saint Barthélemy, where Hallyday's grave is located

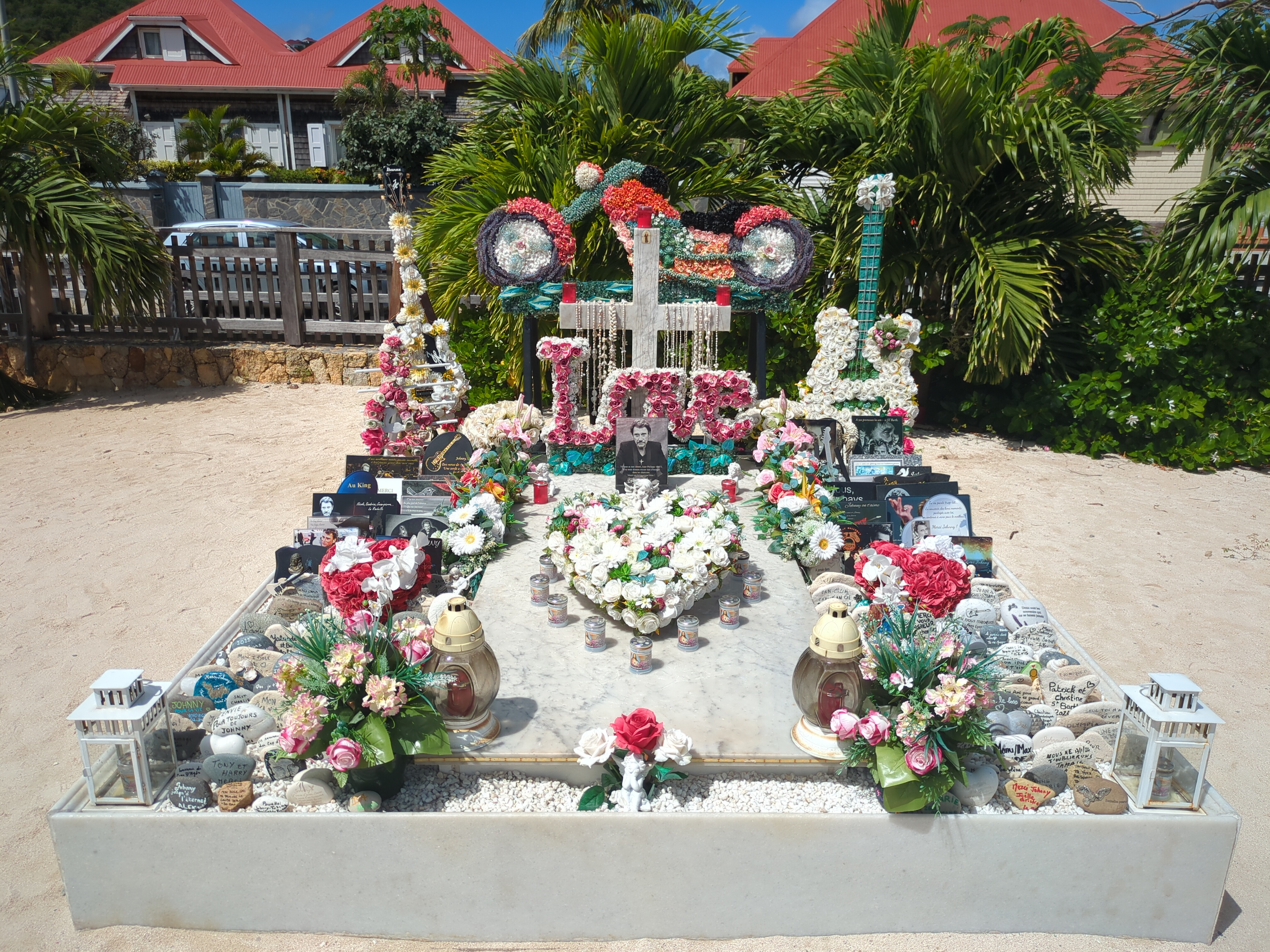
Tombe au cimetière de l'église de Lorient de Saint-Barthélemy

== Legacy ==
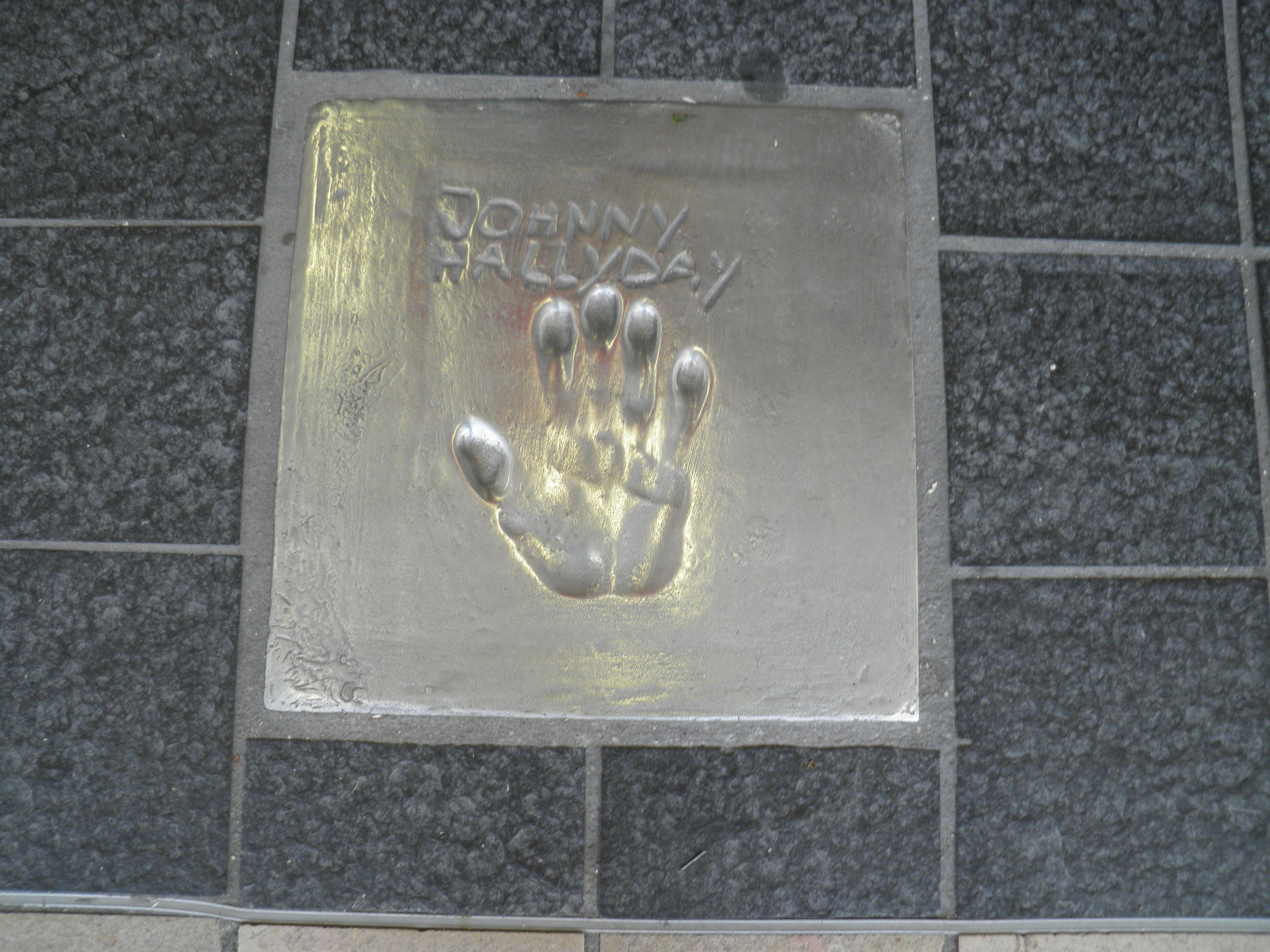
Hallyday's handprint in Cannes Chemin des étoiles (Walk of Fame)

Hallyday was once called "the French Elvis". The Daily Beast described Hallyday as "a hip swiveling, leather-clad Gallic answer to Elvis Presley who shook up his home country's music scene with American-style rock-n-roll and bad-boy antics." He remained largely unknown outside the francophone world and was sometimes described as "the biggest rock star you've never heard of" in English-speaking countries. He was made Chevalier (Knight) of the Legion of Honour in 1997 and Officer of the Order of the Crown (Belgium) in 2001.

Jimmy Buffett paid tribute to Johnny with his song "Johnny's Rhum" on his 2023 album Equal Strain On All Parts.

== Discography ==
=== Studio albums ===
- Hello Johnny (1960)
- Nous les gars, nous les filles (1961)
- Tête à tête avec Johnny Hallyday (1961)
- Viens danser le twist (1961)
- Salut les copains (1961)
- Retiens la nuit (1962)
- Madison Twist (1962)
- L'Idole des jeunes (1963)
- Les Bras en croix (1963)
- Da dou ron ron (1963)
- Les guitares jouent (1964)
- Johnny, reviens ! Les Rocks les plus terribles (1964)
- Le Pénitencier (1964)
- Hallelujah (1965)
- Johnny chante Hallyday (1965)
- La Génération perdue (1966)
- Johnny 67 (1967)
- Jeune Homme (1968)
- Rêve et Amour (1968)
- Rivière… ouvre ton lit (1969)
- Vie (1970)
- Flagrant Délit (1971)
- Country, Folk, Rock (1972)
- Insolitudes (1973)
- Je t'aime, je t'aime, je t'aime (1974)
- Rock 'n' Slow (1974)
- Rock à Memphis (1975)
- La Terre promise (1975)
- Derrière l'amour (1976)
- Hamlet (1976)
- C'est la vie (1977)
- Solitudes à deux (1978)
- Hollywood (1979)
- À partir de maintenant (1980)
- En pièces détachées (1981)
- Pas facile (1981)
- Quelque part un aigle (1982)
- La Peur (1982)
- Entre violence et violon (1983)
- Nashville 84 (1984)
- En V.O. (1984)
- Drôle de métier (1984)
- Spécial Enfants du rock (1984)
- Rock'n'Roll Attitude (1985)
- Gang (1986)
- Cadillac (1989)
- Ça ne change pas un homme (1991)
- Lorada (1995)
- Destination Vegas (1996)
- Ce que je sais (1998)
- Sang pour sang (1999)
- À la vie, à la mort ! (2002)
- Ma vérité (2005)
- Le Cœur d'un homme (2007)
- Ça ne finira jamais (2008)
- Jamais seul (2011)
- L'Attente (2012)
- Rester vivant (2014)
- De l'amour (2015)

=== Foreign-language studio albums ===
- Sings America's Rockin' Hits (1962)
- In italiano (1976)
- Black es noir (1981)
- Rough Town (1994)

=== Posthumous studio albums ===
- Mon pays c'est l'amour (2018)

== Films ==
- Les Diaboliques (1955) as a student (uncredited)
- Tales of Paris (1962) as Jean Allard (segment "Sophie")
- Secret File 1413 (1962) as Himself
- D'où viens-tu Johnny? (1963) as Johnny (but not Hallyday)
- Cherchez l'idole (1964) as Himself
- Les poneyttes (1968) as Himself
- À tout casser (1968) as Frankie
- The Specialist (1969) as Hud Dixon / Brad
- Point de chute (1970) as Vlad the Romanian
- Malpertuis (1971) as the sailor who kisses Bets (uncredited)
- L'aventure, c'est l'aventure (1972) as Himself
- L'Animal (1977) as Himself
- Le jour se lève et les conneries commencent (1981)
- The Case of the Missing Bottle (1983) as Mr. Waitor
- Détective (1984, directed by Jean-Luc Godard) as Jim Fox Warner
- Conseil de famille (1986, directed by Costa-Gavras) as Louis the dad
- Terminus (1986) as Stump
- The Iron Triangle (1989) as Jacques
- La gamine (1992) as Frank Matrix
- Paparazzi (1998) as Himself (uncredited)
- Why Not Me? (1998) as José
- Love Me (2000) as Lennox
- Mischka (2002) as Himself
- The Man on the Train (2002) as Milan
- Crime Spree (2003) as Marcel Burot
- Crimson Rivers II: Angels of the Apocalypse (2004) as the one-eyed hermit
- Quartier V.I.P. (2005) as Alex
- Jean-Philippe (2006) as Jean-Philippe
- Starko! (2008) as Himself
- The Pink Panther 2 (2009) as Laurence Millikin
- Vengeance (2009) as Francis Costello
- Titeuf (2011) as the old adventurer on the train (voice)
- Salaud, on t'aime (2014) as Jacques Kaminsky
- Rock'n Roll (2017) as Johnny Hallyday
- Chacun sa vie et son intime conviction (2017) as Johnny (final film role)

== Books ==
- Hallyday, Johnny (1979). Johnny raconte Hallyday (1st ed.). Paris: Filipacchi. ISBN 2-86391-006-X.
- Hallyday, Johnny; Sthers, Amanda (2014). Dans mes yeux : Johnny Hallyday se raconte à Amanda Sthers. Paris: Pocket. ISBN 9782266236225. OCLC 887560125.

== See also ==
- List of best-selling music artists

| Preceded by Jean-Jacques Goldman | Victoires de la Musique; Male artist of the year 1987 | Succeeded by Claude Nougaro |
