= Salut les copains (album series) =

French compilation album series

Salut les copains is a series of albums released through Universal Music France to commemorate the best of music featured in French scene as sponsored by the "Salut les copains" radio program in France and the French Salut les copains magazine.

Cover of the compilation metal box

The tracks include French original singles, French-language covers of known hits as well as European and American hits popular in France. The track list is a representative wide selection of the "Yé-yé" generation of French music.

== Salut les copains – Vol. 1 1959–1969 – Les années radio ==
=== CD 1 ===
==== 1959–1962 ====
1. The Mar-Keys – "Last Night" (2:37)
2. Richard Anthony – "Nouvelle vague" (2:32)
3. Johnny Hallyday – "Souvenirs souvenirs" (2:12)
4. Les Chaussettes Noires – Daniela (2:32)
5. Frankie Jordan and Sylvie Vartan – "Panne d'essence" (2:19)
6. Dany Logan et Les Pirates – "Je bois du lait" (2:08)
7. Les Chaussettes Noires – "Dactylo rock" (1:36)
8. The Shadows – "Apache" (2:54)
9. Vince Taylor et ces Playboys – "Shaking All Over" (2:24)
10. Johnny Hallyday – "Retiens la nuit" (2:54)
11. Lucky Blondo – "Sheila" (1:59)
12. Dick Rivers & Les Chats Sauvages – "Twist à Saint-Tropez (1:45)
13. Françoise Hardy – "Tous les garçons et les filles" (3:09)
14. Richard Anthony – "J'entends siffler le train" (3:21)
15. Danyel Gérard – "Le petit Gonzales" (3:00)
16. Les Chats Sauvages – "Est-ce que tu le sais?" (3:03)
17. Petula Clark – "Dans le train de nuit" (2:25)
18. Billy Bridge – "Le grand M" (3:47)
19. Johnny Hallyday – "L'idole des jeunes" (2:28)
20. Leny Escudero – "Pour une amourette" (2:13)
21. Richard Anthony – "J'irai twister le blues" (2:40)
22. Claude Nougaro – "Une petite fille" (2:07)
23. Françoise Hardy – "Le temps de l'amour" (2:24)
24. Claude François – "Belles! Belles! Belles!" (2:14)
25. Johnny Hallyday – "Elle est terrible" (Live Olympia 62) (1:59)

=== CD 2 ===
==== 1963–1964 ====
1. Eddie Vartan – "SLC Twist" (2:00)
2. Nancy Holloway – "T'en vas pas comme ça" (2:51)
3. Les Gam's – "Il a le truc" (2:23)
4. Johnny Hallyday – "Da dou ron ron" (2:08)
5. Les Aiglons – "Stalactite" (2:06)
6. France Gall – "Ne sois pas si bête" (2:18)
7. Claude François – "Pauvre petite fille riche" (3:11)
8. Eddy Mitchell – "Be bop a lula 63" (3:40)
9. Sheila – "L'école est finie" (2:33)
10. Frank Alamo – "Ma biche" (2:18)
11. Jean-Jacques Debout – "Pour moi la vie va commencer" (2:07)
12. Michel Laurent – "Le pantin" (2:09)
13. Patricia Carli – "Demain tu te maries (arrête, arrête, ne me touche pas)" (2:53)
14. Les Surfs – "Reviens vite et oublie" (2:35)
15. Monty – "Même si je suis fou" (2:20)
16. Claude François – "Si j'avais un marteau" (2:49)
17. Hugues Aufray – "N'y pense plus, tout est bien" (3:09)
18. Danyel Gérard – "D'accord, d'accord" (2:10)
19. France Gall – "N'écoute pas les idoles" (1:43)
20. Michèle Torr – "Dans mes bras oublie ta peine" (2:25)
21. Marie Laforêt – "Viens sur la montagne" (2:24)
22. Frank Alamo – "Allô maillot 38–37" (2:23)
23. Richard Anthony – "À présent tu peux t'en aller" (2:38)
24. Monty – "Un verre de whisky" (2:11)
25. Lucky Blondo – "Sur ton visage une larme" (2:59)

=== CD 3 ===
==== 1964–1966 ====
1. Les Gamblers – "SLC Surf" (2:06)
2. Johnny Hallyday – "Le pénitencier" (4:02)
3. France Gall – "Laisse tomber les filles" (2:05)
4. Eddy Mitchell – "Repose Beethoven" (2:35)
5. Petula Clark – "Dans le temps" (2:56)
6. Adamo – "La nuit" (3:19)
7. Françoise Hardy – "Mon amie la rose" (2:19)
8. Eddy Mitchell – "Toujours un coin qui me rappelle" (3:21)
9. Hugues Aufray – "On est les rois" (2:43)
10. Sheila – "Vous les copains" (2:13)
11. Dick Rivers – "Va t'en va t'en" (3:13)
12. Frank Alamo – "Le chef de la bande" (3:01)
13. France Gall – "Poupée de cire, poupée de son" (2:31)
14. Christophe – "Aline" (2:50)
15. Adamo – "Mes mains sur tes hanches" (2:56)
16. Hervé Vilard – "Capri c'est fini" (3:35)
17. Eileen – "Ces bottes sont faites pour marcher" (2:33)
18. Guy Marchand – "La passionata" (2:54)
19. Annie Philippe – "Baby Love" (2:36)
20. Claude François – "Même si tu revenais" (2:14)
21. Gillian Hills – "Rien n'est changé" (1:26)
22. Ronnie Bird – "Où va-t-elle?" (1:59)
23. Michel Orso – "Angélique" (3:10)
24. Antoine – "Les élucubrations d'Antoine" (3:27)
25. Serge Gainsbourg – "Qui est "in" qui est "out"" (2:12)

=== CD 4 ===
==== 1966–1969 ====
1. Les Lionceaux – "SLC Jerk" (2:17)
2. Jacques Dutronc – "Et moi, et moi, et moi" (2:53)
3. Johnny Hallyday – "Noir c'est noir" (3:13)
4. Hugues Aufray – "Céline" (3:08)
5. Sheila – "Bang-bang" (3:13)
6. Claude François – "J'attendrai" (2:58)
7. Michel Delpech – "Inventaire 66" (2:34)
8. Jacqueline Taïeb – "7 heures du matin" (2:16)
9. Eddy Mitchell – "Alice" (2:45)
10. Nicoletta – "La musique" (3:27)
11. Michel Jonasz et le King Set – "Apesanteur" (3:47)
12. France Gall – "Bébé requin" (2:43)
13. Claude François – "Comme d'habitude" (4:11)
14. Brigitte Bardot – "Harley Davidson" (2:29)
15. Eric Charden – "Le monde est gris, le monde est bleu" (3:01)
16. Elsa – "Tristesse" (2:23)
17. Michel Fugain – "Je n'aurai pas le temps" (2:42)
18. Gilles Dreu – "Alouette" (2:39)
19. Julien Clerc – "La cavalerie" (2:24)
20. Herbert Léonard – "Quelque chose tient mon cœur" (3:47)
21. Brigitte Bardot et Serge Gainsbourg – "Bonnie and Clyde" (4:15)
22. Tina – "Comme le fleuve aime la mer" (3:35)
23. Jacques Dutronc – "Le responsible" (2:32)
24. Françoise Hardy – "Comment te dire adieu" (2:23)
25. Johnny Hallyday – "Que je t'aime" (3:23)

=== Charts ===
Chart (2011)	Peak position
French Albums Chart	50

== Salut les copains – Vol. 2 1959–1969 – Les années radio ==
=== CD 1 ===
==== 1959–1962 ====
1. Claude François – Jingle "Salut les copains" (0:18)
2. Ray Charles – "What'd I Say" (6:27)
3. Johnny Hallyday – "Laisse les filles" (2:18)
4. Serge Gainsbourg – "L'eau à la bouche" (2:28)
5. Paul Anka – "Diana" (2:27)
6. Sacha Distel – "Scoubidou (Des pommes, des poires)" (3:02)
7. Dalida – "Itsi bitsy petit bikini" (2:17)
8. Henri Salvador – "Le lion est mort ce soir" (2:45)
9. Jeanne Moreau – "Le tourbillon" (2:06)
10. The Tornados – "Telstar" (3:19)
11. Johnny Hallyday – "Viens danser le twist" (4:13)
12. Richard Anthony – "Leçon de twist" (2:14)
13. Vince Taylor et ses Playboys – "Sweet Little Sixteen" (3:21)
14. Les Chaussettes Noires – "Le twist des Chaussettes Noires" (2:45)
15. Richard Anthony – "Fiche le camp Jack" (1:50)
16. Hugues Aufray – "Santiano" (2:16)
17. Leny Escudero – "Ballade à Sylvie" (2:14)
18. Les Chats Sauvages – "Derniers baisers" (2:27)
19. Petula Clark – "Chariot" (2:35)
20. Sylvie Vartan – "Le Loco-motion" (2:15)
21. Sheila – "Sheila" (1:52)
22. Les Chaussettes Noires avec Maurice Chevalier – "Le twist du canotier" (2:34)
23. The Spotnicks – "Orange Blossom Special" (2:17)
24. Gene Vincent – "Be-Bop-A-Lula" (2:11)
25. Claude Nougaro – "Le cinéma" (2:59)
26. Johnny Hallyday – "Tes tendres années" (2:24)
27. Monty – Jingle Salut les copains (0:15)

=== CD 2 ===
==== 1963–1964 ====
1. Richard Anthony – Jingle Salut les copains (0:08)
2. Frank Alamo – "Da doo ron ron" (1:55)
3. Claude François – "Marche tout droit" (1:58)
4. Claude Nougaro – "Le jazz et la java" (2:27)
5. Serge Gainsbourg – "La javanaise" (2:31)
6. Brigitte Bardot – "L'appareil à sous" (1:27)
7. Les Chaussettes Noires – "Il revient" (1:52)
8. Lesley Gore – "It's My Party" (2:23)
9. Les Parisiennes – "Il fait trop beau pour travailler" (2:17)
10. Sheila – "Pendant les vacances" (2:43)
11. Brigitte Bardot – "La Madrague" (2:35)
12. Ricky Nelson – "Teen Age Idol" (2:28)
13. Frank Alamo – "File file file" (1:46)
14. Johnny Hallyday – "Pour moi la vie va commencer" (2:12)
15. Sylvie Vartan – "Si je chante" (1:56)
16. Trini Lopez – "If I Had a Hammer" (2:59)
17. Eddy Mitchell – "Ma maîtresse d'école" (2:13)
18. Claude Nougaro – "Cécile ma fille" (3:29)
19. Adamo – "Tombe la neige" (2:59)
20. France Gall et ses petits amis – "Sacré Charlemagne" (2:52)
21. Hugues Aufray – "Dès que le printemps revient" (3:05)
22. Les Surfs – "À présent tu peux t'en aller" (2:38)
23. Monty – "Ce n'est pas vrai" (2:27)
24. Chuck Berry – "Nadine (Is It You?)" (2:35)
25. Sheila – "Écoute ce disque" (3:22)
26. The Animals – "The House Of The Rising Sun" (4:29)
27. Sheila – Jingle Salut les copains (0:14)

=== CD 3 ===
==== 1964–1966 ====
1. Françoise Hardy – Jingle Salut les copains (0:26)
2. Sylvie Vartan – "La plus belle pour aller danser" (2:35)
3. Johnny Hallyday – "Les mauvais garçons" (1:58)
4. Adamo – "Vous permettez, Monsieur?" (3:01)
5. Georgie Fame – "Yeh Yeh" (2:46)
6. Wayne Fontana & The Mindbenders – "The Game of Love" (2:08)
7. Claude François – "J'y pense et puis j'oublie" (2:21)
8. Roy Orbison – "Oh, Pretty Woman" (2:58)
9. Chuck Berry – "You Never Can Tell" (2:42)
10. Françoise Hardy – "Je veux qu'il revienne" (2:41)
11. Claude Nougaro – "Je suis sous..." (3:18)
12. Petula Clark – "Downtown" (3:07)
13. The Supremes – "Baby Love" (2:35)
14. Sacha Distel – "Scandale dans la famille" (3:39)
15. Michel Delpech – "Chez Laurette" (3:30)
16. Thierry Vincent – "Les yeux fermés" (2:25)
17. The Byrds – "Mr. Tambourine Man" (2:31)
18. Sam the Sham & The Pharaohs – "Wooly Bully" (2:22)
19. Ronnie Bird – "Fais attention!" (2:19)
20. France Gall – "Attends ou va-t-en" (2:32)
21. Tom Jones – "What's New Pussycat?" (2:06)
22. Christophe – "Les marionnettes" (2:33)
23. Eddy Mitchell – "Et s'il n'en reste qu'un" (3:12)
24. Annie Philippe – "Ticket de quai" (2:39)
25. Hugues Aufray – "Les crayons de couleur" (2:53)
26. Serge Gainsbourg – "Docteur Jekyll et Monsieur Hyde" (2:00)
27. Barry Ryan – "Eloise" (5:51)
28. Annie Philippe – Jingle Salut les copains (0:09)

=== CD 4 ===
==== 1966–1969 ====
1. Johnny Hallyday – Jingle Salut les copains (0:26)
2. France Gall – "Les sucettes" (2:36)
3. Johnny Hallyday – "Cheveux longs et idées courtes" (3:43)
4. Anne Germain / Claude Parent – "Chanson des jumelles" (3:57)
5. Françoise Hardy – "La maison où j'ai grandi" (3:43)
6. The Mamas & the Papas – "California Dreamin'" (2:39)
7. The Beach Boys – "Good Vibrations" (3:37)
8. Jacques Dutronc – "La fille du Père Noël" (2:36)
9. James Brown – "I Got You (I Feel Good)" (2:48)
10. The Troggs – "Wild Thing" (2:35)
11. The Spencer Davis Group – "Keep On Running" (2:47)
12. Johnny Hallyday – "Hey Joe" (3:05)
13. Herman's Hermits – "No Milk Today" (2:58)
14. Claude François – "Mais quand le matin" (3:19)
15. Laurent – "Ma reine de Saba" (2:56)
16. Sheila – "Adios amor" (3:20)
17. Sylvie Vartan – Jingle Salut les copains (0:18)
18. The Moody Blues – "Nights In White Satin" (4:25)
19. Nicoletta – "Il est mort le soleil" (3:14)
20. Aphrodite's Child – "Rain and Tears" (3:14)
21. Serge Gainsbourg with Brigitte Bardot – "Comic Strip" (2:11)
22. Jacques Dutronc – "Il est cinq heures, Paris s'éveille" (2:55)
23. The Equals – "Baby, Come Back" (2:31)
24. Julien Clerc – "Ivanovitch" (3:02)
25. Johnny Hallyday – "Je suis né dans la rue" (4:26)
26. Michel Delpech – "Wight Is Wight" (3:54)
27. Adamo – Jingle Salut les copains (0:18)

=== Charts ===
Chart (2011)	Peak position
French Albums Chart	76

== Salut les copains – Vol. 3 1969–1976 – Les années magazine ==
=== CD 1 ===
==== 1969–1970 ====
1. Joe Dassin – "Les Champs-Élysées" (2:39)
2. Mike Brant – "Laisse-moi t'aimer" (3:22)
3. Cat Stevens – "Lady D'Arbanville" (3:40)
4. Barbara – "L'aigle noir" (4:55)
5. Leonard Cohen – "The Partisan" (3:22)
6. Georges Moustaki – "Le métèque" (2:32)
7. Nicoletta – "Ma vie c'est un manège" (2:52)
8. David Alexandre Winter – "Oh Lady Mary" (2:55)
9. Wallace Collection – "Daydream" (5:00)
10. Jean-François Michael – "Adieu jolie Candy" (2:52)
11. Aphrodite's Child – "It's Five O'Clock" (3:29)
12. Maurice Dulac & Marianne Mille – "Dis à ton fils" (2:44)
13. Marcel Zanini – "Tu veux ou tu veux pas" (2:45)
14. Philippe Lavil – "Avec les filles je ne sais pas" (2:38)
15. Rare Bird – "Sympathy" (2:44)
16. Ekseption – "The 5th" (3:23)
17. Johnny Hallyday – "Jésus-Christ" (3:10)
18. Free – "All Right Now" (5:33)
19. Deep Purple – "Black Night" (3:25)
20. Shocking Blue – "Venus" (3:00)

=== CD 2 ===
==== 1971–1972 ====
1. James Brown – "Sex Machine" (5:16)
2. Johnny Hallyday – "Oh! Ma jolie Sarah" (4:41)
3. Sheila – "Les rois mages" (3:22)
4. Joe Dassin – "L'Amérique" (2:26)
5. Nicoletta – "Mamy Blue" (3:50)
6. Michel Fugain & Le Big Bazar – "Une belle histoire" (3:16)
7. Claude François – "Il fait beau, il fait bon" (3:17)
8. Michel Delpech – "Pour un flirt" (3:25)
9. Charles Jérôme – "Kiss Me" (3:05)
10. Frédéric François – "Laisse-moi vivre ma vie" (3:28)
11. Danyel Gérard – "Butterfly" (3:25)
12. Gérard Palaprat – "Fais moi un signe" (3:06)
13. Serge Reggiani – "L'Italien" (3:59)
14. Séverine – "Un banc, un arbre, une rue" (3:00)
15. Poppys – "Non, non, rien n'a changé" (3:10)
16. Martin Circus – "Je m'éclate au Sénégal" (4:07)
17. Claude François – "C'est la même chanson" (2:57)
18. Tom Jones – "She's a Lady" (2:52)
19. Esther Galil – "Le jour se lève" (3:19)
20. Billy Paul – "Me and Mrs. Jones" (4:44)

=== CD 3 ===
==== 1972–1973 ====
1. Michel Sardou – "La maladie d'amour" (3:29)
2. Véronique Sanson – "Chanson sur une drôle de vie" (2:33)
3. Michel Fugain & Le Big Bazar – "Fais comme l'oiseau" (3:07)
4. Mort Shuman – "Le lac Majeur" (5:24)
5. Michel Delpech – "Que Marianne était jolie" (3:31)
6. Jane Birkin – "Di Doo Dah" (3:34)
7. Claude François – "Le lundi au soleil" (2:52)
8. Patrick Juvet – "La musica" (3:01)
9. Sheila – "Poupée de porcelaine" (3:15)
10. Tri Yann – "Les prisons de Nantes" (2:04)
11. Nilsson – "Without You" (3:17)
12. Mike Brant – "Rien qu'une larme" (3:21)
13. Demis Roussos – "Goodbye, My Love, Goodbye" (3:58)
14. Nana Mouskouri – "Soleil soleil" (3:04)
15. Nicoletta – "Fio Maravilla" (3:35)
16. Hugues Aufray – "Hasta luego" (2:44)
17. Sheila – "Samson et Dalila" (3:01)
18. Michel Delpech – "Les divorcés" (4:16)
19. Françoise Hardy – "Message personnel" (4:14)
20. Serge Lama – "Je suis malade" (4:10)

=== CD 4 ===
==== 1974–1975 ====
1. Claude François – "Le téléphone pleure" (4:00)
2. Michel Jonasz – "Dites-moi" (3:13)
3. Eddy Mitchell – "À crédit et en stéréo" (3:10)
4. Dave – "Vanina" (3:05)
5. Christophe – "Señorita" (2:54)
6. Mike Brant – "C'est comme ça que je t'aime" (3:18)
7. Claude-Michel Schönberg – "Le premier pas" (4:47)
8. Dick Annegarn – "Bruxelles" (2:28)
9. Claude Nougaro – "Dansez sur moi" (3:21)
10. Jean-Michel Caradec – "Ma petite fille de rêve" (2:43)
11. William Sheller – "Rock'n'dollars" (2:29)
12. Richard Anthony – "Amoureux de ma femme" (2:42)
13. Pierre Groscolas – "Lady Lay" (2:55)
14. Au Bonheur des Dames – "Oh les filles!" (4:56)
15. Pierre Vassiliu – "Qui c'est celui-là?" (4:17)
16. Sheila – "Ne fais pas tanguer le bateau" (3:43)
17. Michel Delpech – "Quand j'étais chanteur" (3:55)
18. Nicolas Peyrac – "So Far Away From L.A." (4:14)
19. 10cc – "I'm Not In Love" (3:43)
20. Barry White – "You're the First, the Last, My Everything" (4:34)

=== CD 5 ===
==== 1975–1976 ====
1. Christophe – "Les Mots bleus" (4:10)
2. Joe Dassin – "L'été indien" (4:31)
3. Michel Sardou – "Je vais t'aimer" (5:28)
4. Mike Brant – "Dis-lui" (3:48)
5. Il Était Une Fois – "J'ai encore rêvé d'elle" (3:39)
6. Gérard Lenorman – "La ballade des gens heureux" (3:18)
7. Eddy Mitchell – "Sur la route de Memphis" (2:53)
8. Michel Delpech – "Le chasseur (Les oies sauvages)" (3:03)
9. Mort Shuman – "Papa-Tango-Charly" (4:44)
10. William Sheller – "Dans un vieux rock'n'roll" (4:46)
11. Nicolas Peyrac – "Et mon père" (2:54)
12. Gérard Lenorman – "Michèle" (3:08)
13. Marie-Paule Belle – "La Parisienne" (2:54)
14. Sheila – "Quel tempérament de feu" (3:14)
15. Dave – "Du côté de chez Swann" (2:57)
16. Barry White – "Let The Music Play" (4:14)
17. Donna Summer – "Love To Love You Baby" (3:20)
18. Claude François – "Cette année-là" (3:11)
19. Johnny Hallyday – "Gabrielle" (2:53)
20. Eddy Mitchell – "Pas de boogie woogie" (3:43)

=== Charts ===
Chart (2011)	Peak position
French Albums Chart	52

== Salut les copains – 1959–1968 – Best Of ==
=== CD 1 ===
==== 1959–1962 ====
1. The Mar-Keys – "Last Night" (2:37)
2. Johnny Hallyday – "Souvenirs souvenirs" (2:10)
3. Elvis Presley – "It's Now or Never" (3:15)
4. Richard Anthony – "Nouvelle vague" (2:32)
5. Ray Charles – "What'd I Say" (6:25)
6. Dalida – "Itsi bitsy petit bikini" (2:16)
7. The Shadows – "Apache" (2:54)
8. Les Chaussettes Noires – "Dactylo rock" (1:36)
9. The Tornados – "Telstar" (3:18)
10. Vince Taylor et ses Playboys – "Shaking All Over" (2:24)
11. Ben E. King – "Stand By Me" (2:57)
12. Brenda Lee – "I'm Sorry" (2:40)
13. Ray Charles – "Unchain My Heart" (2:50)
14. Les Chaussettes Noires – "Daniela" (2:32)
15. Les Chats Sauvages – "Est-ce que tu le sais?" (3:03)
16. Frankie Jordan et Sylvie Vartan – "Panne d'essence" (2:15)
17. Leny Escudero – "Pour une amourette" (2:13)
18. Danyel Gérard – "Le petit Gonzales" (2:59)
19. Vince Taylor et ses Playboys – "Sweet Little Sixteen" (3:19)
20. Chris Montez – "Let's Dance" (2:25)
21. Gene Vincent – "Be-Bop-A-Lula" (2:34)
22. Chubby Checker – "Let's Twist Again" (2:21)
23. Dick Rivers & Les Chats Sauvages – "Twist à Saint-Tropez" (1:45)
24. Les Chaussettes Noires with Maurice Chevalier – "Le twist du canotier" (2:33)
25. Eddie Vartan – "SLC Twist" (1:59)

=== CD 2 ===
==== 1962–1963 ====
1. The Beatles – "Love Me Do" (2:18)
2. Claude François – "Belles! Belles! Belles!" (2:13)
3. Sheila – "L'école est finie" (2:33)
4. Johnny Hallyday – "L'idole des jeunes" (2:28)
5. Françoise Hardy – "Tous les garçons et les filles" (3:09)
6. Eddy Mitchell – "Be bop a lula 63" (3:40)
7. Petula Clark – "Chariot" (2:34)
8. Richard Anthony – "J'entends siffler le train" (3:21)
9. Lucky Blondo – "Sheila" (1:59)
10. Elvis Presley – "Return to Sender" (2:05)
11. Hugues Aufray – "Santiano" (2:12)
12. Sylvie Vartan – "Le Loco-motion" (2:14)
13. Frank Alamo – "Ma biche" (2:18)
14. Danyel Gérard – "D'accord, d'accord" (2:10)
15. Patricia Carli – "Demain tu te maries (arrête, arrête, ne me touche pas)" (2:53)
16. Sylvie Vartan – "Tous mes copains" (2:34)
17. Frank Alamo – "Da doo ron ron" (1:53)
18. Lesley Gore – "It's My Party" (2:21)
19. Claude Nougaro – "Le jazz et la java" (2:24)
20. Sheila – "Sheila" (1:48)
21. Monty – "Un verre de whisky" (2:11)
22. Nancy Holloway – "T'en vas pas comme ça" (2:52)
23. Les Surfs – "Reviens vite et oublie" (2:35)
24. The Beach Boys – "Surfin' Safari" (2:04)
25. Les Gamblers – "SLC Surf" (2:06)

=== CD 3 ===
==== 1964–1965 ====
1. Sylvie Vartan – "La plus belle pour aller danser" (2:34)
2. Adamo – "Vous permettez, Monsieur?" (3:00)
3. France Gall – "Laisse tomber les filles" (2:04)
4. Claude François – "Si j'avais un marteau" (2:49)
5. Sheila – "Vous les copains" (2:13)
6. Chuck Berry – "You Never Can Tell" (2:41)
7. Richard Anthony – "À présent tu peux t'en aller" (2:39)
8. Petula Clark – "Downtown" (3:05)
9. Johnny Hallyday – "Le pénitencier" (4:02)
10. Hervé Vilard – "Capri c'est fini" (3:34)
11. Michèle Torr – "Dans mes bras oublie ta peine" (2:25)
12. Wayne Fontana & The Mindbenders – "The Game of Love" (2:07)
13. Les Parisiennes – "Il fait trop beau pour travailler" (2:16)
14. Georgie Fame – "Yeh Yeh" (2:45)
15. Dick Rivers – "Va t'en va t'en" (3:13)
16. The Supremes – "Baby Love" (2:34)
17. Adamo – "Mes mains sur tes hanches" (2:56)
18. The Byrds – "Mr. Tambourine Man" (2:24)
19. Michel Delpech – "Chez Laurette" (3:29)
20. Eddy Mitchell – "Toujours un coin qui me rappelle" (3:21)
21. Tom Jones – "What's New Pussycat?" (2:05)
22. Eileen – "Ces bottes sont faites pour marcher" (2:32)
23. Ronnie Bird – "Fais attention!" (2:18)
24. The Mamas & The Papas – "California Dreamin'" (2:38)
25. Les Lionceaux – "SLC Jerk" (2:16)

=== CD 4 ===
==== 1966–1968 ====
1. Michel Polnareff – "Love Me Please Love Me" (4:19)
2. France Gall – "Poupée de cire, poupée de son" (2:30)
3. Jacques Dutronc – "Et moi, et moi, et moi" (2:53)
4. Serge Gainsbourg – "Docteur Jekyll et Monsieur Hyde" (1:59)
5. Antoine – "Les élucubrations d'Antoine" (3:27)
6. Johnny Hallyday – "Noir c'est noir" (3:13)
7. Brigitte Bardot – "Harley Davidson" (2:28)
8. Michel Delpech – "Inventaire 66" (2:33)
9. Claude François – "Comme d'habitude" (4:09)
10. Hugues Aufray – "Céline" (3:06)
11. Herman's Hermits – "No Milk Today" (2:57)
12. Michel Polnareff – "La poupée qui fait non" (3:12)
13. France Gall – "Les sucettes" (2:34)
14. James Brown – "I Got You (I Feel Good)" (2:47)
15. Sheila – "Bang-bang" (3:11)
16. The Troggs – "Wild Thing" (2:34)
17. Nicoletta – "La musique" (3:27)
18. Michel Fugain – "Je n'aurai pas le temps" (2:42)
19. Jacqueline Taïeb – "7 heures du matin" (2:14)
20. Anne Germain / Claude Parent – "Chanson des jumelles" (3:29)
21. The Moody Blues – "Nights In White Satin" (4:24)
22. Nicoletta – "Il est mort le soleil" (3:13)
23. Michel Polnareff – "L'amour avec toi" (3:06)
24. Brigitte Bardot and Serge Gainsbourg – "Bonnie and Clyde" (4:14)
25. Jacques Dutronc – "Il est cinq heures, Paris s'éveille" (2:53)

=== Charts ===
Chart (2011)	Peak position
French Albums Chart	35
