= The Hurlers =

Group of three stone circles in Cornwall, England

- An Hurlysi (Cornish)
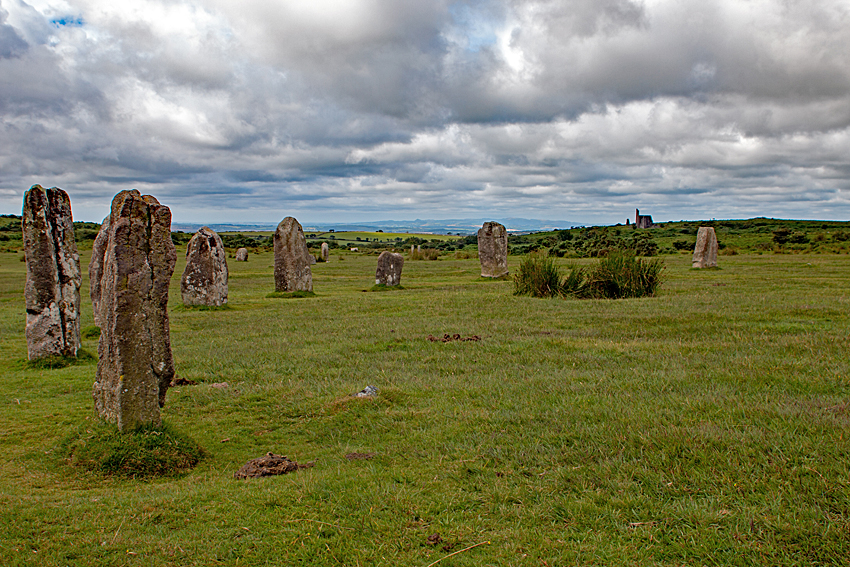

- Location within Cornwall
- 50°30′59″N 4°27′29″W
- Type: Stone circles
- Location: Minions
- OS grid reference: SX 25784 71374

Site notes
- Area: Bodmin Moor
- Governing body: Cornwall Heritage Trust
- Owner: English Heritage

Scheduled monument
- Official name: The Hurlers: three stone circles with paired outlying stones
- Designated: 9 October 1981
- Reference no.: 1008117

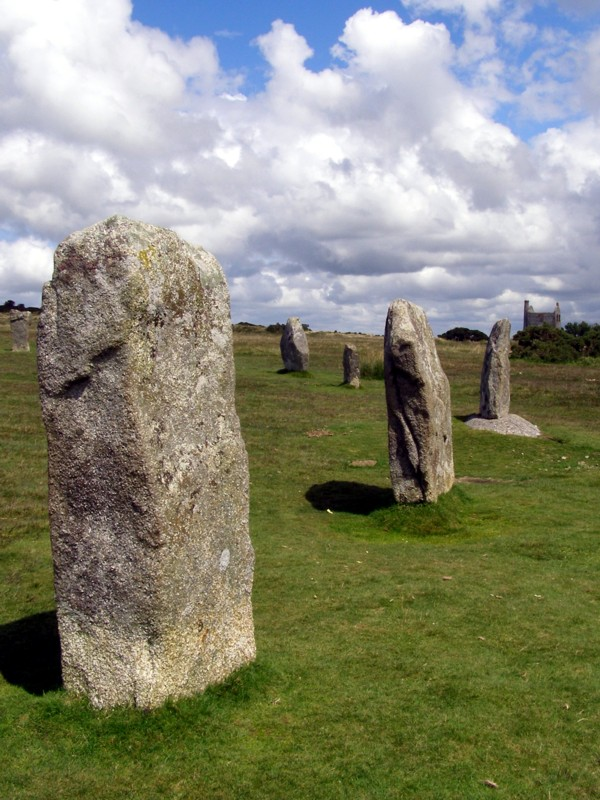
Standing stones in the middle circle of The Hurlers

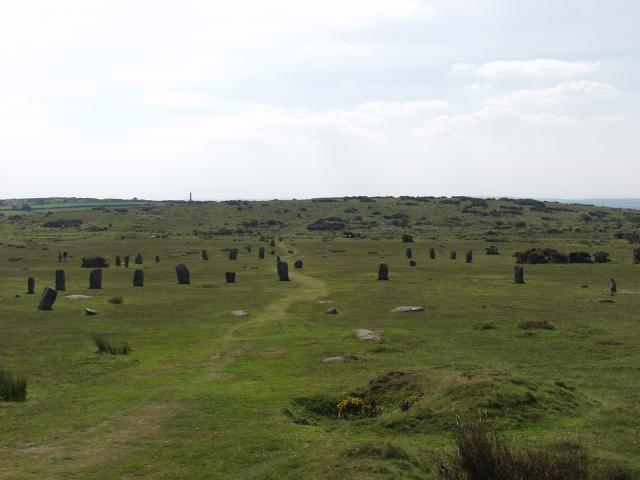
The Hurlers from the north

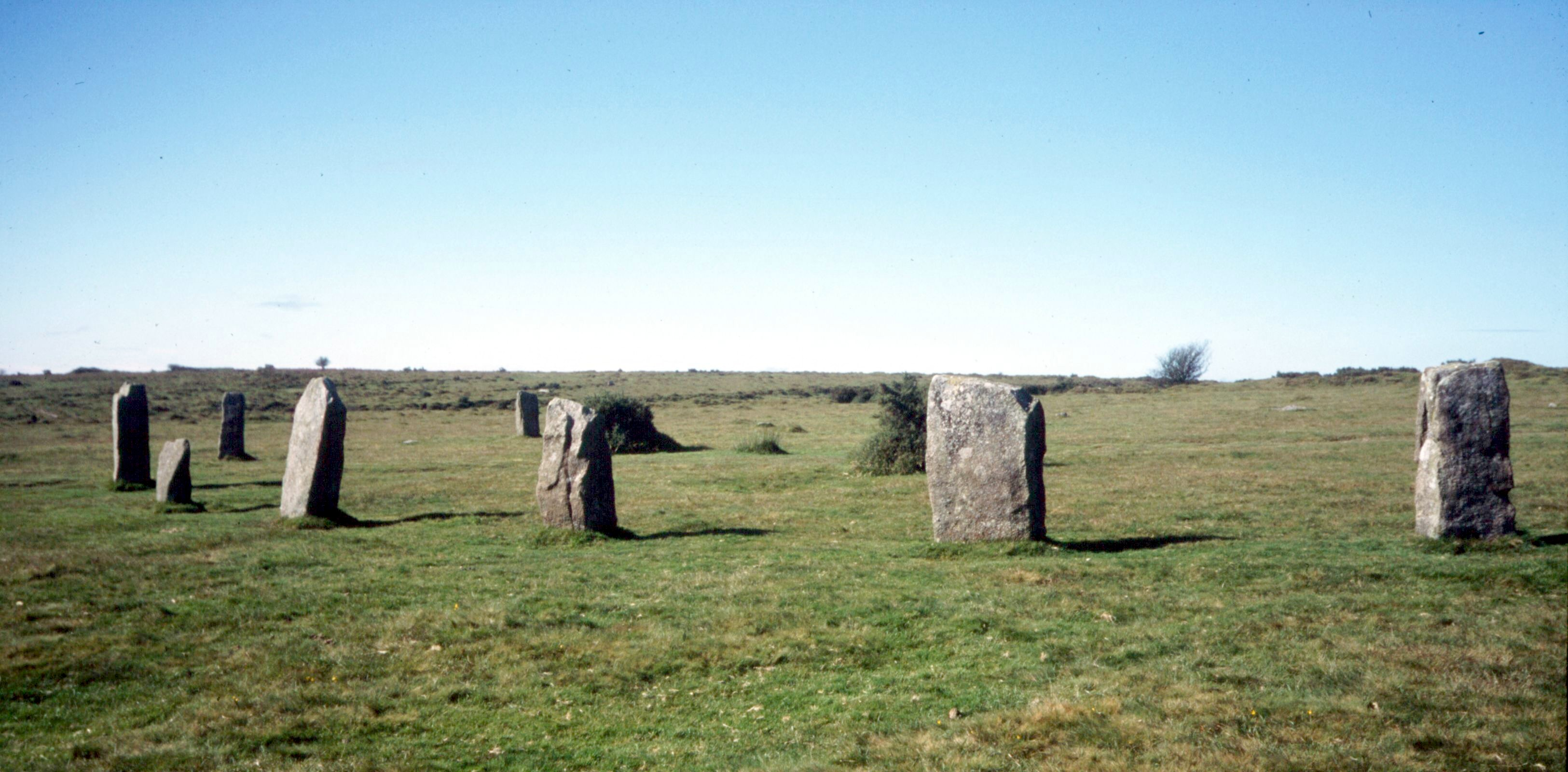
The north circle

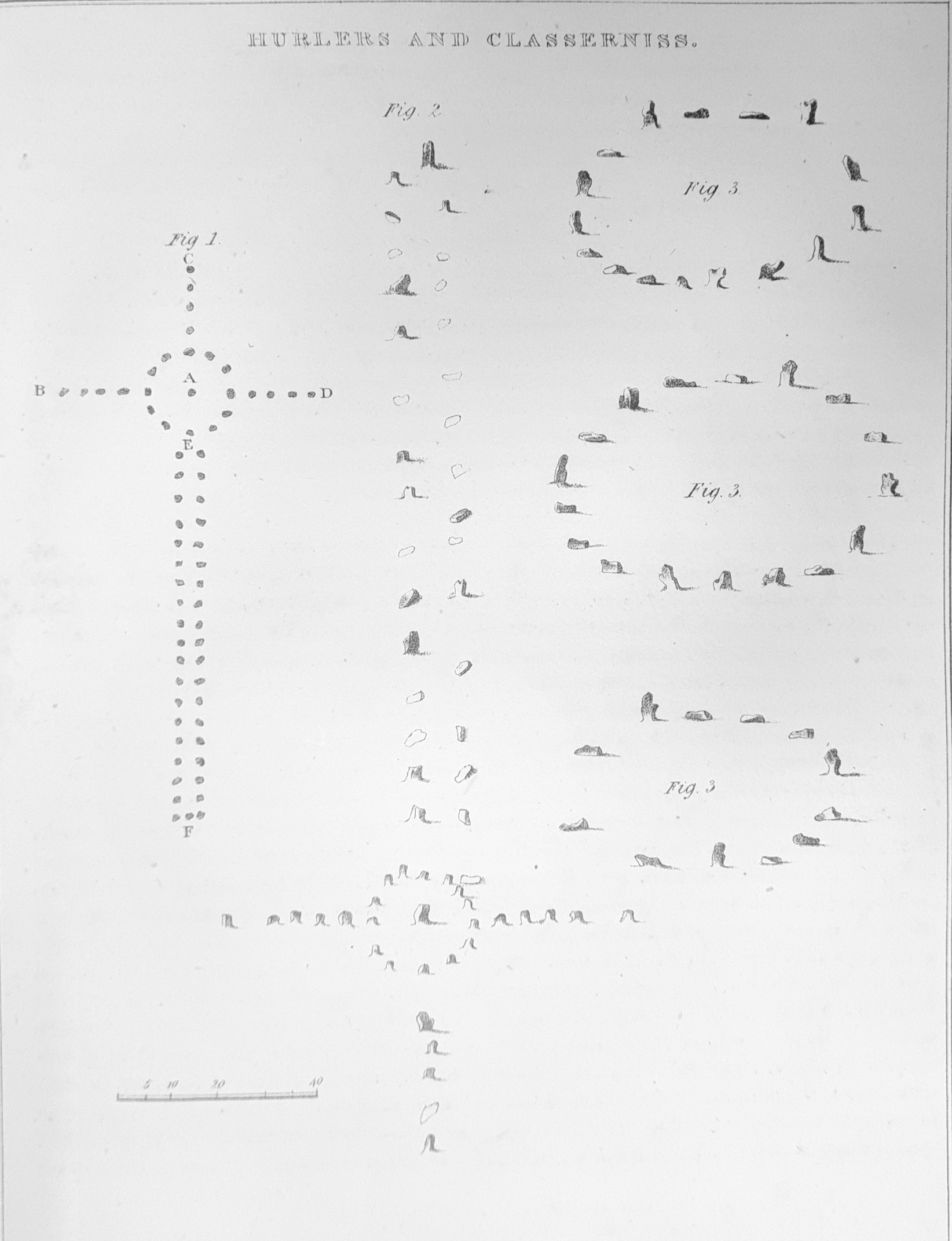
The Hurlers, stone circles, St Claire, Cornwell, 1829

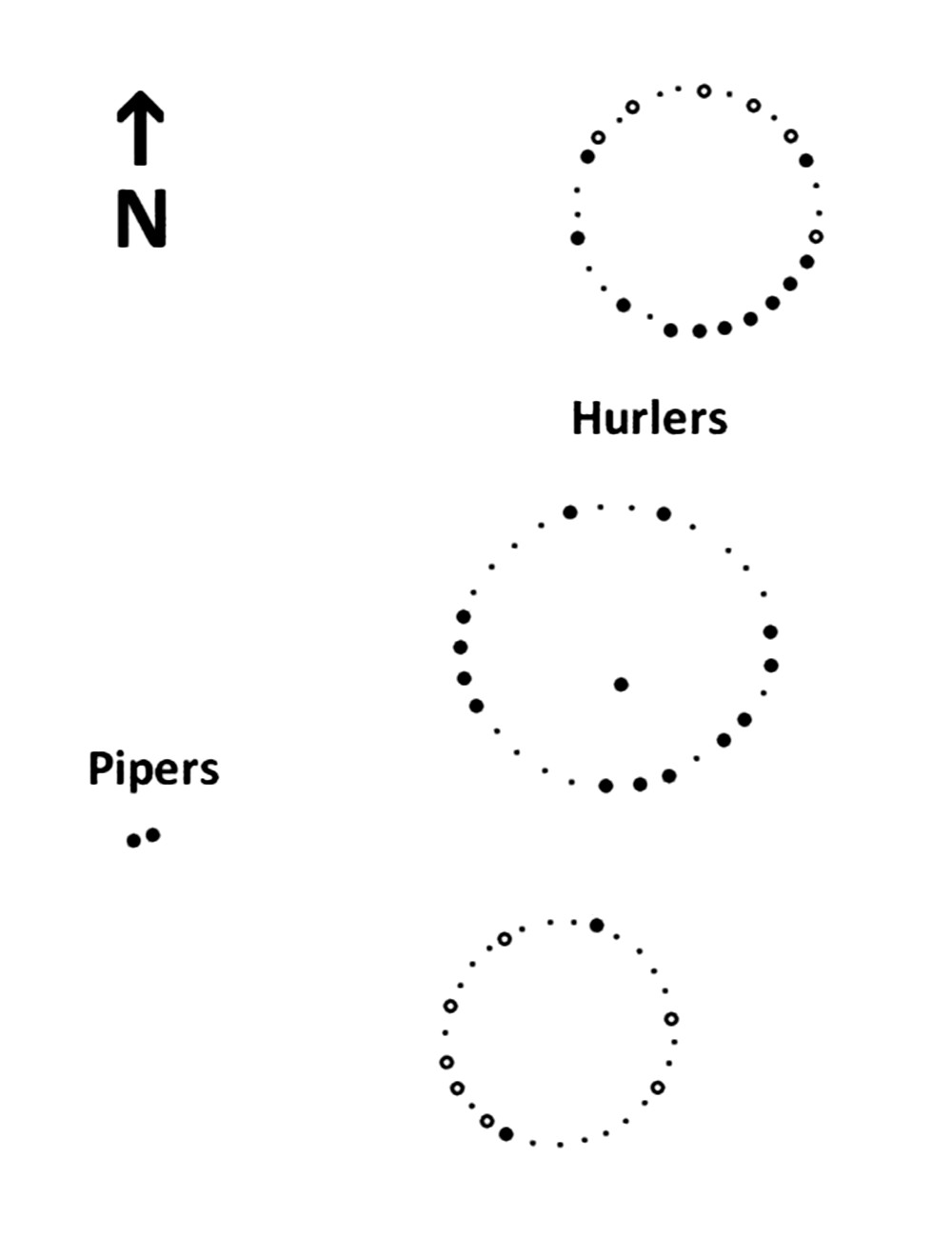
Map of the stone circles

The Hurlers (Cornish: An Hurlysi) is a group of three stone circles in the civil parish of St Cleer, Cornwall, England, UK. The site is half-a-mile (0.8 km) west of the village of Minions on the eastern flank of Bodmin Moor, and approximately four miles (6 km) north of Liskeard.

== Location ==
The Hurlers are north of Liskeard near the village of Minions on the southern edge of Bodmin Moor in east Cornwall. Just to the west of the circles are two standing stones known as the Pipers. Nearby are Rillaton Barrow and Trethevy Quoit, an entrance grave from the Neolithic period. The Hurlers are managed by the Cornwall Heritage Trust on behalf of English Heritage.

== Origin of the name ==
The name "Hurlers" derives from a legend, in which men were playing Cornish hurling on a Sunday and were magically transformed into stones as punishment. The "Pipers" are supposed to be the figures of two men who played tunes on a Sunday and suffered the same fate. According to another legend, it is impossible to accurately count the number of standing stones.

== Construction ==
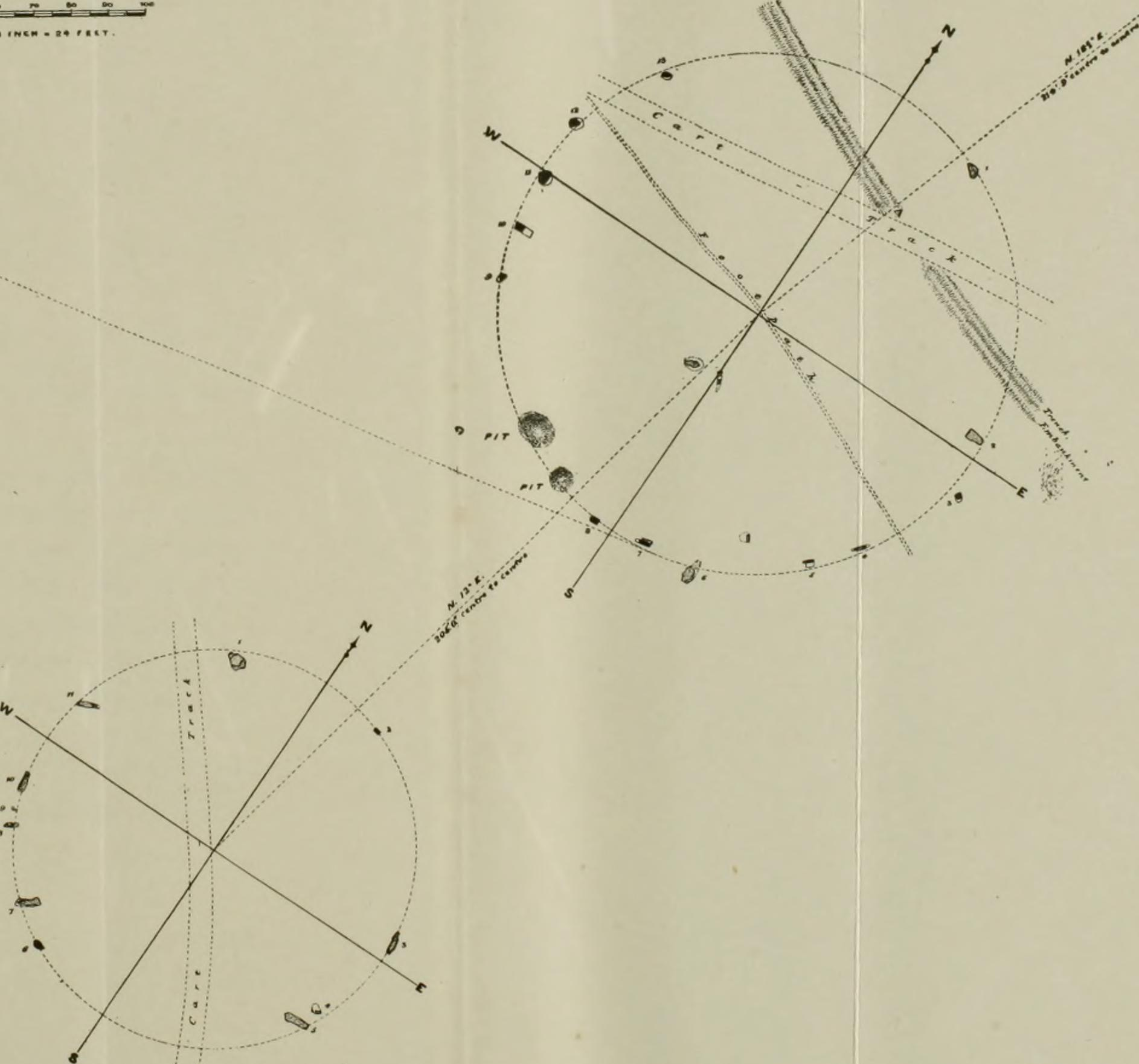
Plan of the Hurlers, 1906

The Hurlers comprises three stone circles that lie on a line from SSW to NNE, and have diameters of 35 metres (115 ft), 42 metres (138 ft) and 33 metres (108 ft). The two outer stone circles are circular. The middle circle, the largest is slightly elliptical. The survival of the southern stone circle, which now contains nine stones, has been most precarious: only two of the remaining stones are upright and the other seven are partially covered with soil. In the middle circle 14 stones survive out of 28. The stones show clear traces of being hammered smooth. The northern stone circle contained around 30 standing stones, from which 15 are still visible. Two other monoliths, the Pipers, are 100 metres (330 ft) southwest of the middle circle and may be entrance stones to the Hurlers.

== Early accounts ==
The earliest mention of the Hurlers was by historian John Norden, who visited them around 1584. They were described by William Camden in his Britannia of 1586. In 1754 William Borlase published the first detailed description of the site.

== Excavations ==
Ralegh Radford excavated the site in the 1930s, and partly restored the two northern circles by re-erecting some stones and placing marker stones in the positions of those missing. Archives from the unpublished excavation reports have been re-evaluated by Jacky Nowakowski (Cornwall Archaeological Unit) and John Gould (English Heritage) and may result in more analysis and publication.

There have been several subsequent investigations. Between 1975 and 1985 aerial survey and subsequent analysis by various teams, (including Cambridge University, University College London, RCHME and co-ordinated by Cornwall Archaeology Unit) was used to identify and map the features. English Heritage conducted a geophysical survey in 2004. A survey by the Cornwall Archeological Unit in 2009 indicated that there might also be a fourth circle and two stone rows.

The Hurlers was protected as a scheduled monument in 1981, and the protected area was extended in 1994 to include the Pipers.

== Alignments ==
In 1967 Scottish engineer Alexander Thom suggested borderline case alignments at the Hurlers. He suggested two solar alignments of four stones with far uprights. He suggested two stone-to-site alignments with Vega and Arcturus and two other site-to-site alignments with Arcturus. Each stellar alignment was given with tabulated declinations at a date some time in between the range of 2100 to 1500 BC.

== Cornwall Heritage Trust ==
In 1999 there was controversy regarding the site and others under the care of English Heritage. Members of a pressure group, the Revived Cornish Stannary Parliament, removed signs bearing the English Heritage name. After this action several smaller sites, including The Hurlers, Dupath Well, Tregiffian Burial Chamber, St Breock Downs Monolith, King Doniert's Stone, Trethevy Quoit and Carn Euny, were transferred to the management of the Cornwall Heritage Trust.

== Popular culture ==
The Hurlers are the subject of a 2008 song by Devon singer, Seth Lakeman.
