= List of number-one singles of 1970 (France) =

This is a list of the French Singles & Airplay Chart Reviews number-ones of 1970.

== Summary ==
=== Singles Chart ===
Week	Issue Date	Artist	Single
1	3 January	Marcel Zanini	"Tu veux ou tu veux pas"
2	10 January	Michel Delpech	"Wight Is Wight"
3	17 January	Michel Polnareff	"Dans la maison vide"
4	24 January	Michel Polnareff	"Dans la maison vide"
5	31 January	Aphrodite's Child	"It's Five O'Clock"
6	7 February	Aphrodite's Child	"It's Five O'Clock"
7	14 February	Johnny Hallyday	"Ceux que l'amour a blessés"
8	21 February	Johnny Hallyday	"Ceux que l'amour a blessés"
9	28 February	Johnny Hallyday	"Ceux que l'amour a blessés"
10	7 March	Johnny Hallyday	"Ceux que l'amour a blessés"
11	14 March	Ekseption	"The 5th"
12	21 March	The Beatles	"Let It Be"
13	28 March	The Beatles	"Let It Be"
14	4 April	The Beatles	"Let It Be"
15	11 April	The Beatles	"Let It Be"
16	18 April	Michel Sardou	"Mourir de plaisir"
17	25 April	Ennio Morricone	"Man with a Harmonica"
18	2 May	Ennio Morricone	"Man with a Harmonica"
19	9 May	Johnny Hallyday	"Jésus-Christ"
20	16 May	Michel Polnareff	"Un train, ce soir"
21	23 May	Paul McCartney	"Maybe I'm Amazed"
22	30 May	Simon & Garfunkel	"Bridge over Troubled Water"
23	6 June	Simon & Garfunkel	"Bridge over Troubled Water"
24	13 June	Simon & Garfunkel	"Bridge over Troubled Water"
25	20 June	Simon & Garfunkel	"Bridge over Troubled Water"
26	27 June	Rare Bird	"Sympathy"
27	4 July	Rare Bird	"Sympathy"
28	11 July	Mungo Jerry	"In the Summertime"
29	18 July	Mungo Jerry	"In the Summertime"
30	25 July	Mungo Jerry	"In the Summertime"
31	1 August	Mungo Jerry	"In the Summertime"
32	8 August	Mungo Jerry	"In the Summertime"
33	15 August	Mungo Jerry	"In the Summertime"
34	22 August	Mardi Gras	"Girl, I've Got News for You"
35	29 August	Mardi Gras	"Girl, I've Got News for You"
36	5 September	Mardi Gras	"Girl, I've Got News for You"
37	12 September	Marc Hamilton	"Comme j'ai toujours envie d'aimer"
38	19 September	Marc Hamilton	"Comme j'ai toujours envie d'aimer"
39	26 September	Marc Hamilton	"Comme j'ai toujours envie d'aimer"
40	3 October	Michel Polnareff	"Gloria"
41	10 October	Creedence Clearwater Revival	"Run Through the Jungle"
42	17 October	Johnny Hallyday	"Deux amis pour un amour"
43	24 October	Johnny Hallyday	"Deux amis pour un amour"
44	31 October	Johnny Hallyday	"Deux amis pour un amour"
45	7 November	Cat Stevens	"Lady D'Arbanville"
46	14 November	The Moody Blues	"Melancholy Man"
47	21 November	The Moody Blues	"Melancholy Man"
48	28 November	The Moody Blues	"Melancholy Man"
49	5 December	The Moody Blues	"Melancholy Man"
50	12 December	Johnny Hallyday	"Essayez"
51	19 December	Johnny Hallyday	"Essayez"
52	26 December	George Harrison	"My Sweet Lord"
53	31 December	George Harrison	"My Sweet Lord"

== See also ==
- 1970 in music
- List of number-one hits (France)
