= Gentil dauphin triste =

Single by Gérard Lenorman

from the album Drôles de chansons
- B-side: "On n'est jamais content"
- Released: 1976
- Genre: Chanson, pop
- Length: 3:45
- Label: CBS Disques
- Composer: Gérard Lenorman
- Lyricist: Pierre Delanoë
- Producer: Jean-Jacques Souplet

Gérard Lenorman singles chronology
"Michèle" (1976)	"Gentil dauphin triste" (1976)	"Voici les clés" (1976)

"Gentil dauphin triste" (lit. Sad Kind Dolphin) is a song by French singer-songwriter Gérard Lenorman, composed and performed by him with lyrics by Pierre Delanoë in 1976, taken from the album Drôles de chansons.

== Reception ==
"Gentil dauphin triste" is one of Lenorman's best-known songs.

The song achieved significant success, selling more than 600,000 copies. Lenorman said it is "less well known than La Ballade des gens heureux, but it is my biggest success".

== Theme ==
The song is a reaction to the psychosis triggered by the film Jaws.

== Charts and certifications ==
=== Weekly charts ===
Chart (1976)	Peak position
Belgium (Ultratop 50 Wallonia)	2
Europe (Europarade)	21
France (IFOP)	2
Québec (Palmarès francophone)	3

=== Year-end charts ===
Chart (1976)	Position
France (IFOP)	5

=== Certifications ===
Country	Certification	Date	Sales
France (SNEP)	Gold	1976	600 000
