= Arnaud Vallens =

French actor from Brive-la-Gaillarde (born 1973)

- Born: 1 December 1973 (age 52); Brive-la-Gaillarde, France
- Occupations: Actor, comedian, producer
- Years active: 1996–present

Arnaud Vallens (1 December 1973) is a French actor from Brive-la-Gaillarde.

== Biography ==
In early 2012, Vallens crossed paths with Lisa Escudero, the granddaughter of singer Leny Escudero. She offered him an opportunity to play George Dandin by Molière at the Avignon Off Festival the same year. On his return from Avignon, Vallens reprised the role of George Dandin in Paris. Vallens was subsequently offered various other acting work, including parts in music videos and TV series. He was also offered roles in short films such as The Pipers Ammar Quteineh, awarded at EICAR 2013; and The Voice of Thief by Adnan Jodorowsky, which won at the Strange Festival in 2013 and the Festival of Gerardmer in 2014. At the same time, he wrote, produced and directed his own works such as Encumbrance, a short film on the subject of disability, and For Iksha, a long-form feature film.

== Filmography ==
=== Films ===
==== Long films ====
- 2013 : Joséphine de Agnès Obadia : Businessman
- 2013 : Les Gamins d'Anthony Marciano: Délégué
- 2012 : Maman de Alexandra Leclère
- 2000 : Aïe : Visiteur hôpital
- 2000 : La Confusion des genres d'Ilan Duran Cohen : Le bellâtre

==== Short films ====
- 2015 : The Shower de Arnaud Vallens
- 2015 : Encumbrance de Arnaud Vallens
- 2013 : Angel and Death de Fabien Dovetto et Aurélien Milhaud
- 2013 : L'Ascenseur de William Van De Walle
- 2013 : Fric-Frac au 2310 de Fabien Dovetto et Aurélien Milhaud
- 2013 : L'amour a la clé de Johan Libéreau avec Noémie Merlant
- 2012 : The Voice Thief de Adan Jodorowsky
- 2012 : Nous étions quelques hommes de Maxime Lebas : Homme de main
- 1999 : Errare humanum est de Olivier Cortet

==== Medium films ====
- 2014 : The Pipers d'Ammar Quteineh : Captain Mark
- 2013 : Fulfilled Promise de Ammar Quteineh : Mercenaire
- 2013 : Projection de Léo Devienne

=== Television ===
==== Téléfilms ====
- 2013 : de Julien Israël épisode n°80 de la série télévisée "Au nom de la vérité" produit par Arthur : Father
- 2000 : La Bicyclette bleue de Thierry Binisti : Soldat français

==== Series ====
- 2014 : Groland
- 2000 : PJ de Gérard Vergez : client de marché
- 2000 : H, Canal+ : Patient
- 1999 : Justice de Gilbert Le Guen : Gardien de la paix

=== Others ===
==== Clips ====
- 2014 : Barry de Raphaël Zanetto
- 1999 : Only Rely on Myself by Olivier Cortet

==== Ads ====
- 2015 : Film Axance-Forbiiz by Julien Joyeux-Vittoriani
- 2013 : Jean Bon de Morgann Gicquel
- 2012 : Le Souffle de Wilfrid Brimo for Fédération Nationale de Solidarité des Femmes

== Théâtre ==
- 2014 : Dandin (Molière) Mise en Scène de Lisa Escudero: George Dandin Théâtre Abc Théâtre, Paris
- 2013 : Dandin (Molière) Mise en Scène de Lisa Escudero: George Dandin Théâtre Darius Milhaud, Paris
- 2012 : Dandin (Molière) Mise en Scène de Lisa Escudero: George Dandin Avignon
- 1998 : Desire Under the Elms de Eugene O'Neill – Mise en Scène Peter Douglas Cabot, Londres
- 1996 : Le Médecin Volant (Molière) Mise en Scène de Arnaud Vallens : Valère, Caen
