= Tremar =

Hamlet in Cornwall, England

Coordinates: 50°29′17″N 4°27′27″W

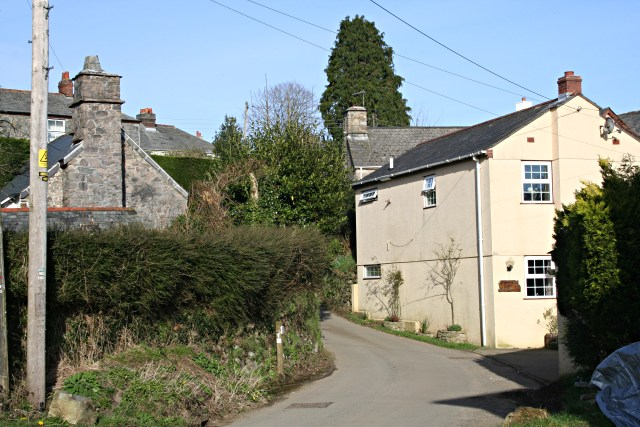
Lower Tremar

Tremar is a hamlet in the parish of St Cleer, Cornwall, England, United Kingdom. It is about 1 km south of Darite and includes Lower Tremar and Venland Cross.

From the early 1960s to the 1980s, it was the home of Tremar Pottery.

Tremar had a population of 629 people in 2021.

== See also ==
- Tremar Coombe
