= Trethevy Quoit =

Dolmen in the Cornwall region, England

- Koyt Tredhewi (Cornish)
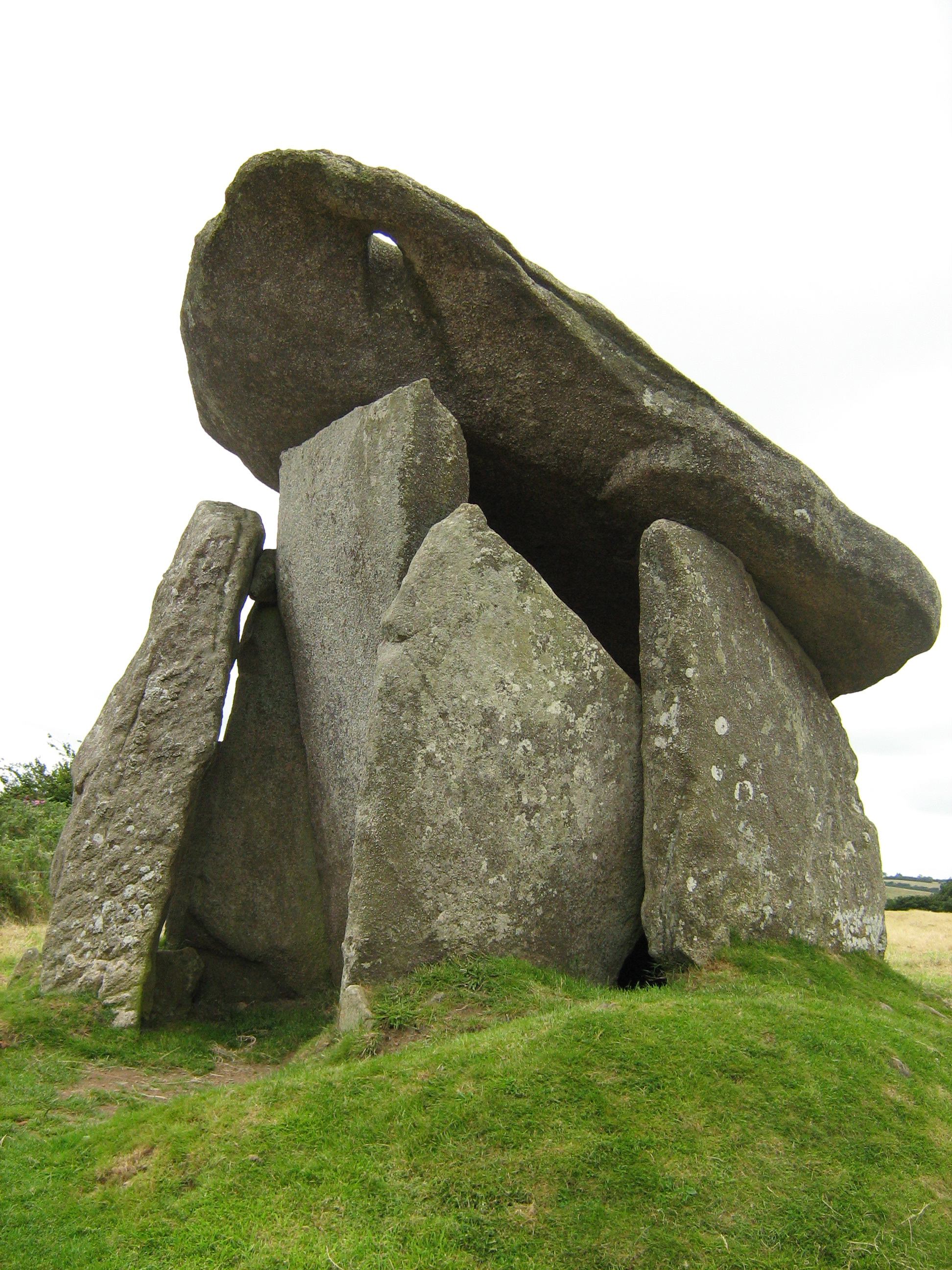
- Trethevy Quoit viewed from the northwest

- Location within Cornwall
- 50°29′35″N 4°27′20″W
- Type: Dolmen
- Periods: Neolithic
- Location: St Cleer, Cornwall

Site notes
- Owner: Cornwall Heritage Trust
- Public access: Yes

Scheduled monument
- Official name: Trethevy Quoit
- Designated: 10 August 1923
- Reference no.: 1017579

Trethevy Quoit (Cornish: Koyt Tredhewi) is a well-preserved megalithic structure between St Cleer and Darite in Cornwall, England, United Kingdom. It is known locally as "the giant's house". Standing 9 feet (2.7 m) high, it consists of five standing stones capped by a large slab and was added to the Heritage at Risk Register in 2017.

== Location ==
Trethevy Quoit is north of Liskeard in the hamlet of Tremar Coombe. Nearby Trethevy farmhouse is a Grade II* listed building. Nearby are The Hurlers, three stone circles dating from the late Bronze Age. The site is owned and managed by the Cornwall Heritage Trust on behalf of English Heritage.

== Construction ==
Like other portal structures of this type, Trethevy Quoit was originally covered by a mound. The remnants of this suggest a diameter of 6.5 metres (21 ft). The remaining seven stones and the 3.7-metre (12 ft) long and 10.5-ton cover slab were inside the mound. At the upper end of the cover slab is a natural hole, which may have been used for astronomical observation. The group of horizontal stones is composed of a fallen back wall, two overlapping side wall stones, a front stone and a somewhat remote flanking stone. The special feature of Cornish portal graves is that by such stones sometimes a smaller partially closed area is created before the front end. Some stones have hole-like perforations as decoration. The front stone is often called an entrance stone, although in most portal structures this can not be moved. Trevethy Quoit is a rare exception here, because a small rectangular stone moving at the bottom right of the front allows access to the chamber, which is now opened only very rarely.

The back of the chamber has collapsed inwards and now forms a pile inside the chamber. Erect, this stone would be about the height of the front stone, so that the cover slab would not have once been held up by the side stones, but rested almost horizontal solely on the front stone and rear walls. However, there would have been a considerable gap between the support stones and the side walls, by which soil could have penetrated into the chamber. It is therefore likely that the collapse of the rear wall and the falling of the cover slab damaged the side stones. In November 2017 the quoit was added to Historic England's Heritage at Risk Register, because of damage caused by fencing and increasing erosion by livestock.

== Studies ==
Trethevy Quoit was first mentioned in 1584 by John Norden, in a topographical and historical account of Britain, but this account was first published in 1728. In the 19th century William Copeland Borlase studied the site and made drawings of it. From this study came the first conjectures on the overturned back wall and the earlier appearance of quoit. Hencken in 1932 wrote the first modern interpretation, in which he explained the special nature of the antechamber, and pointed out parallels to structures in Brittany. Recent excavations showed that this type of megalith was erected in the Neolithic period between 3700 and 3500 BC and such megaliths may have been used over a long period of time as religious structures or community graves.

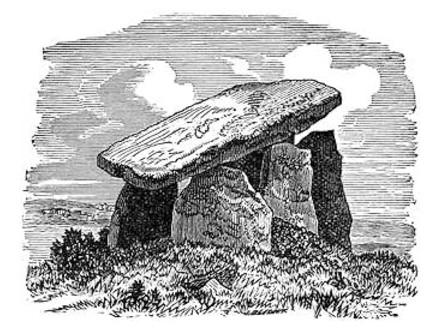
Etching by W. C. Borlase 1872

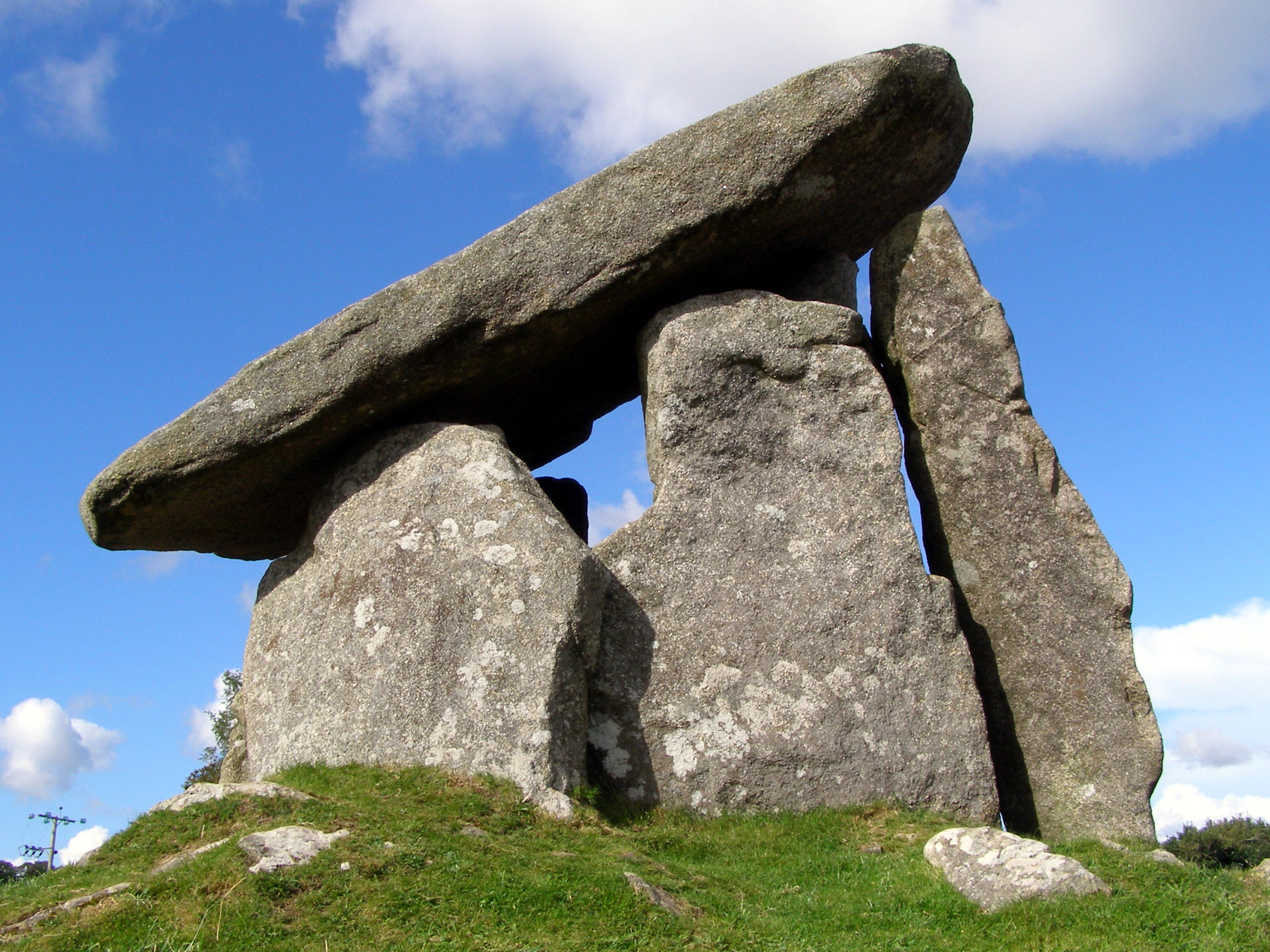
East side of Trethevy Quoit

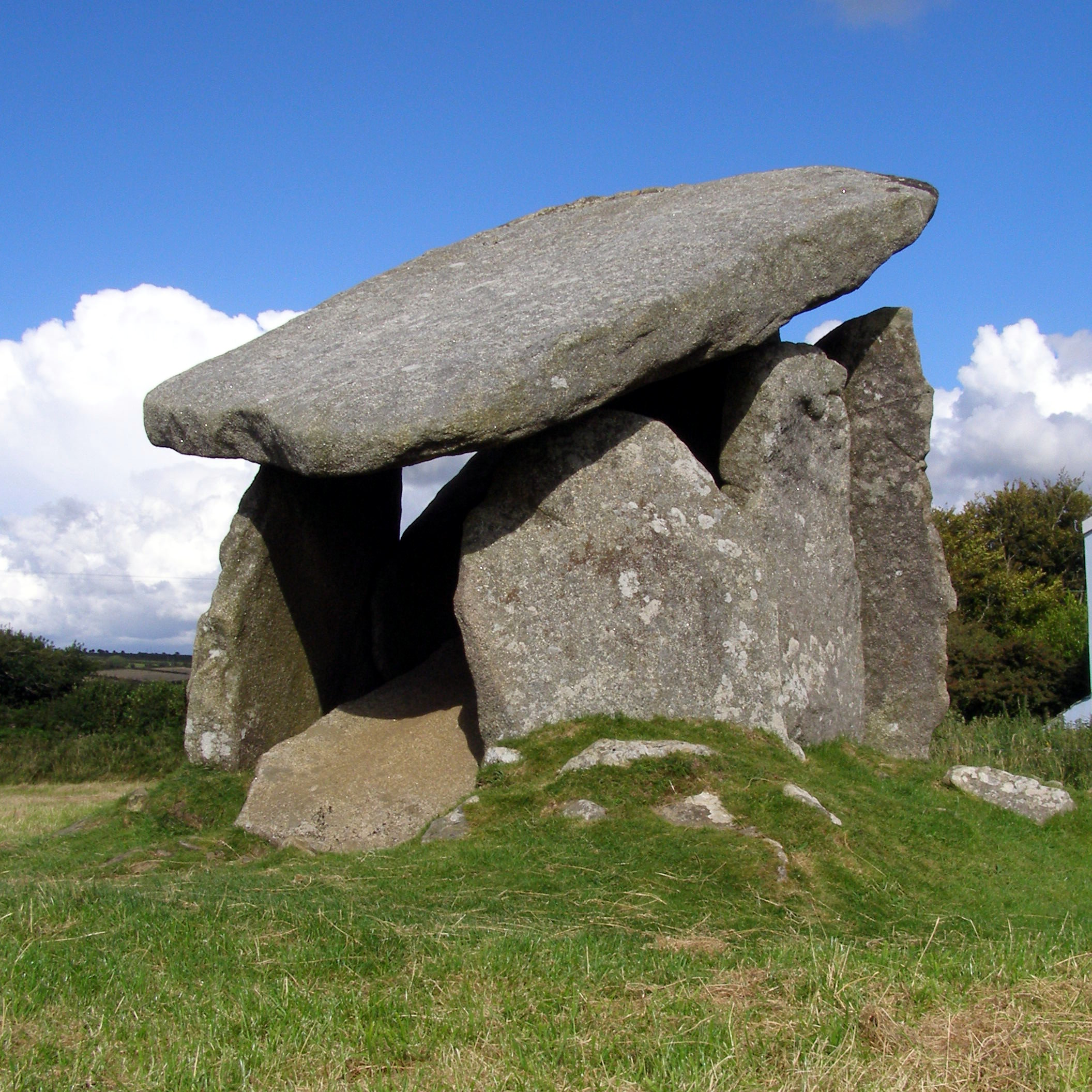
The quoit from the south
