= Drôles de chansons =

Studio album by Gérard Lenorman
- Released: 1976
- Genre: Variety; Chanson
- Label: CBS
- Producer: Jean-Jacques Souplet

Gérard Lenorman chronology
Gérard Lenorman (1975)	Drôles de chansons (1976)	Au-delà des rêves (1977)

Singles from Drôles de chansons
- 1. "Michèle" Released: February 1976; 2. "Gentil dauphin triste" Released: July 1976; 3. "Voici les clés" Released: November 1976; 4. "Sous d'autres latitudes" Released: June 1977

Drôles de chansons is the sixth studio album by French singer Gérard Lenorman, released in 1976 by CBS Disques.

The album was certified gold in France by SNEP for sales of 100,000 copies. In 1997, Drôles de chansons was reissued on CD by the Versailles label.

== Singles ==
Several songs from the album were released as 45 rpm singles and achieved commercial success, including "Michèle", Gentil dauphin triste, and "Voici les clés", the latter reaching number one on the charts in France and French-speaking Belgium. The album's final single, "Sous d'autres latitudes", enjoyed more modest success. The song "S'il vous plaît les nuages" was released as a 45 rpm single exclusively in Japan, with "La Ballade des gens heureux" as the B-side.

== Track listing ==
Face A
No.	Title	Writer(s)	Length
1.	"Comme une chanson bizarre"	Nicolas Peyrac, Gérard Lenorman	5:45
2.	"S'il vous plaît des nuages"	Jean Virginie Vérigneaux, Philippe Lhommet	3:52
3.	"Les Cathédrales"	Didier Barbelivien, Gérard Stern	3:58
4.	"Le Temps"	Barbelivien, Stern	3:00
5.	"Gentil dauphin triste"	Lenorman, Pierre Delanoë	3:45

Face B
No.	Title	Writer(s)	Length
6.	"Voici les clés"	Delanoë, Toto Cutugno, Vito Pallavicini	3:45
7.	"Invitation à la mort"	Barbelivien, Lenorman	5:10
8.	"Sous d'autres latitudes"	Philippe Lavil	3:00
9.	"Michèle"	Barbelivien, Michel Cywie	3:08
10.	"Et puis lentement"	Daniel Seff, Richard Seff	3:08
11.	"Drôle de chanson"	Barbelivien	1:35

== Credits ==
- Gérard Lenorman – vocals
- Benoît Kaufman – arrangements, orchestral conducting (5)
- Guy Mattéoni – arrangements, orchestral conducting (tracks: 1–4, 6–11)
- Bernard Estardy – sound engineer
- Jean-Jacques Souplet – artistic direction
- Roth + Sauter – illustration (front cover)
- Maxime Rebière – illustration (inner sleeve)
- Alain Marouani – photography

Credits adapted from the album liner notes.

== Charts ==
Chart (1976–1977)	Peak position
France (SNEP)	1
France (GIEEPA)	3
Dutch Albums (Album Top 100)	16

== Certifications ==
Region	Certification	Certified units/sales
France (SNEP)	Gold	100,000^{*}
^{*} Sales figures based on certification alone.
