= Cornwall Heritage Trust =

- Trest Ertach Kernow
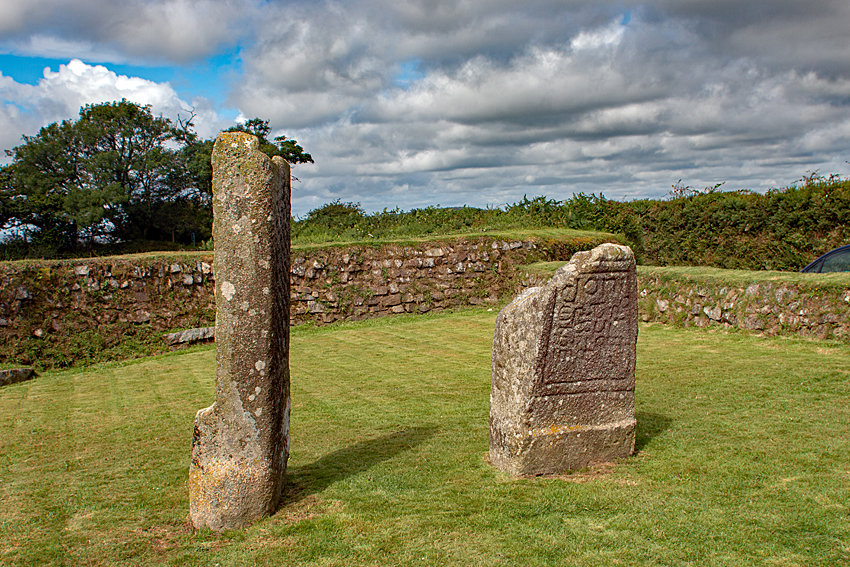
- King Doniert's Stone
- Formation: 1985
- Location: Cornwall
- Members: 10,000+
- President: Edward Bolitho
- Staff: R Trant (Chairman); Cathy Woolcock (Chief Executive)
- Website: www.cornwallheritagetrust.org

The Cornwall Heritage Trust (Cornish: Trest Ertach Kernow) is an organisation which owns and manages historic sites in Cornwall, England. It was founded in 1985. It works in close cooperation with Natural England, Historic England and English Heritage.

== List of managed sites ==
The Trust owns or manages the following sites:

- Caer Bran
- Carn Euny
- Castle an Dinas
- Duloe stone circle
- Dupath Well
- East Pentire Headland
- Hurlers Stone Circles
- Lammana Chapel
- King Doniert's Stone
- Sancreed Beacon
- St Breock Downs Monolith
- St Cleer Holy Well and Cross
- Tregiffian Burial Chamber
- Trethevy Quoit
- Trevanion Culverhouse
- Treffry Viaduct
- Tregonning Hill
- Warbstow Bury
