= List of number-one hits of 1971 (Argentina) =

This is a list of the songs that reached number one in Argentina in 1971, according to Billboard magazine with data provided by Rubén Machado's "Escalera a la fama".

Issue date	Song	Artist(s)
March 6	"Girl, I've Got News for You"	Mardi Gras/Carlos Bisso
March 27	"Girl, I've Got News for You"	Mardi Gras/Carlos Bisso
April 24	"Te quiero, te quiero"	Nino Bravo
June 19	"Vuelvo a vivir, vuelvo a cantar"	Sabú
July 10	"Vuelvo a vivir, vuelvo a cantar"	Sabú
July 31	"La chica de la boutique"	Heleno/Pepito Pérez
September 4	"Estoy hecho un demonio"	Safari
September 11	"Estoy hecho un demonio"	Safari
October 2	"Estoy hecho un demonio"	Safari
October 9	"Estoy hecho un demonio"	Safari
October 16	"Help (Get Me Some Help)"	Tony Ronald
October 30	"Quiero gritar que te quiero"	Quique Villanueva
November 20	"Quiero gritar que te quiero"	Quique Villanueva
December 11	"The Fool"	Gilbert Montagné

== See also ==
- 1971 in music
