= Salut les copains =

Salut les copains - French for hello mates or hi buddies - may refer to:

- Salut les copains (radio program), a French radio variety program on Europe 1
  - Yé-yé, a French style of music based on music broadcast by radio program Salut les copains
- Salut les copains (magazine), a French music publication (later renamed Salut!)
- Salut les copains (musical), a French musical based on the songs of the period
- Salut les copains (album series), series of compilation albums from the hits on Salut les copains radio program and the print magazine
- "Salut les copains", 1957 song by French singer Gilbert Bécaud
- Salut les copains, 1961 album by French singer Johnny Hallyday
