= L'Envie =

1988 single by Johnny Hallyday

Single by Johnny Hallyday

from the album Johnny à Bercy
- B-side: "Equipe de Nuit"
- Released: January 1988
- Recorded: September–October 1987
- Studio: Palais Omnisport de Paris-Bercy, Paris
- Genre: Rock
- Length: 4:18
- Label: Philips
- Songwriter(s): Jean-Jacques Goldman
- Producer(s): Michel Berger, Jean-Pierre Janiaud

Johnny Hallyday singles chronology
"Laura" (1987)	"L'Envie" (1988)	"Que je t'aime" (1988)

Music video
- "L'Envie" (Live at Bercy, 1987) on YouTube

"L'Envie" is a song written by Jean-Jacques Goldman and originally recorded by French singer Johnny Hallyday on his 1987 album Gang.

In 1988 a live version of the song recorded at Palais de Bercy in 1987 was released as a single from Hallyday's 1988 live album Johnny à Bercy.

== Composition and writing ==
The song was written by Jean-Jacques Goldman.

== Charts ==
=== "L'Envie" (en concert à Bercy) ===
Chart (1988)	Peak position
France (SNEP)	15

=== "L'Envie" ===
Chart (2009)	Peak position
Belgium (Ultratop Back Catalogue Singles)	2
Chart (2012–2016)	Peak position
France (SNEP)	116
Chart (2017)	Peak position
France (SNEP)	3
