= Si j'étais président =

- 7" vinyl single cover

Single by Gérard Lenorman

from the album La clairière de l'enfance
- B-side: "La gadoue"
- Released: 1980
- Genre: Chanson, pop
- Length: 3:40
- Label: Carrere
- Composer: Gérard Lenorman
- Lyricist: Pierre Delanoë
- Producers: Guy Mattéoni, Gérard Lenorman

Music video
- "Si j'étais président" (French TV, 1980) on YouTube

"Si j'étais président" (lit. 'If I were the president') is a song by French singer-songwriter Gérard Lenorman from his 1980 album La clairière de l'enfance. It was also released as a single.

In France, the song achieved a cult status.

In it, the young singer imagines what he would do if he were the president of France. He recites the measures he would take to please children. (The measures happen to be funny, childish and naïve.)

The song appeared at a time of economic crisis. Lenorman was 35 years old at the time.

== Composition ==
Lenorman co-wrote this song with Pierre Delanoë.

== Covers ==
The song was covered by many artists including Kids United.

== Charts ==
Chart (1980)	Peak position
Netherlands (Single Top 100)	28
