= Darite =

Coordinates: 50.4985°N 04.4560°W

- Location within Cornwall
- OS grid reference: SX258692
- Shire county: Cornwall
- Region: South West
- Country: England
- Sovereign state: United Kingdom
- Post town: Liskeard
- Postcode district: PL14 5
- Police: Devon and Cornwall
- Fire: Cornwall
- Ambulance: South Western

Darite is a village in the civil parish of St Cleer (where the 2011 census population was included), Cornwall, England, United Kingdom. It is three miles (5 km) north of Liskeard.There is one pub, The Crows Nest, from where a track leads up the Gonamena valley to Minions.

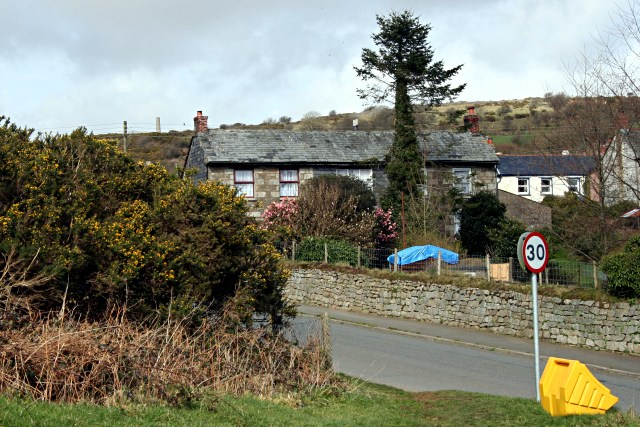
Darite
