= King Doniert's Stone =

- Menkov Donyerth Ruw (Cornish)
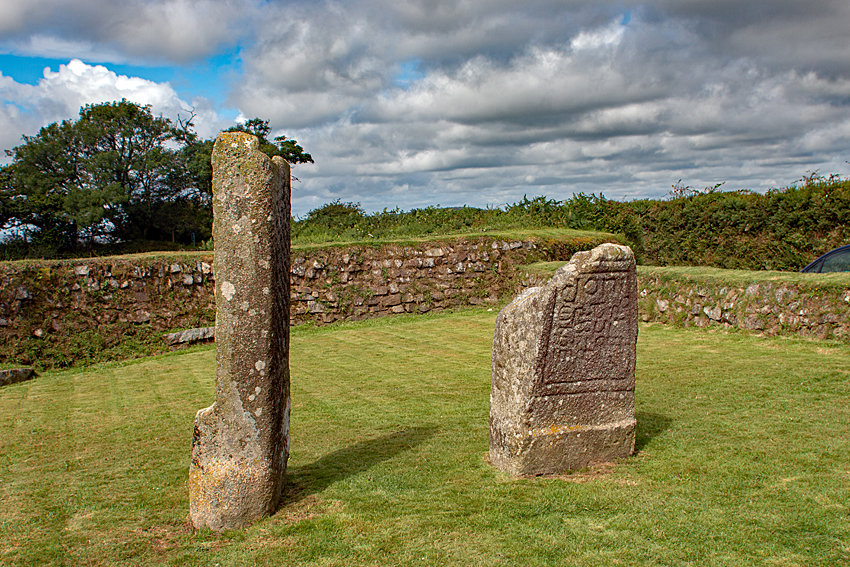
- The Other Half Stone (left) and King Doniert's Stone (right)

- Location within Cornwall
- 50°29′34.1″N 4°29′17.2″W
- Location: St Cleer
- OS grid reference: SX 23619 68846

History
- Built: 9th century

Site notes
- Area: Bodmin Moor
- Governing body: Cornwall Heritage Trust
- Owner: English Heritage

Scheduled monument
- Official name: The Doniert Stone, accompanying cross shaft and underground chamber 650m SW of Common Moor
- Designated: 25 June 1929
- Reference no.: 1010873

King Doniert's Stone (Cornish: Menkov Donyerth Ruw) consists of two pieces of a decorated 9th-century cross, near St Cleer on Bodmin Moor, Cornwall. The inscription is believed to commemorate Dungarth, King of Cornwall, who died around 875.

== History ==
In the 5th century, Christianity was first brought to Cornwall by monks from Wales and Ireland. The early missionaries are believed to have erected wooden crosses to show places in which they had won victories for Christ. In time these places became sanctified and the wooden crosses were replaced by stone ones.

== The site ==
The site consists of the remains of two granite cross-shaft fragments dating from the 9th–11th century, and an underground passage and cross-shaped chamber below the crosses, thought to be either the remains of tin workings or a possible oratory. The northern cross, the Doniert Stone, is 1.37 metres (4 ft 6 in) high with panels of interlace decoration on three sides and inscription doniert rogavit pro anima carved in half uncial or insular script. The inscription translates as "Doniert has asked [for this to be made] for his soul['s sake']".

The inscription is thought to refer to the local ruler Dumgarth (or Dwingarth), who is recorded in the early Welsh chronicle known as the Annales Cambriae as having drowned in around 875 AD. It has a mortise slot and a plinth at the base. It is notable for being the only inscription to a Cornish King also known from documentary sources.

The southern cross, sometimes referred to as the Other Half Stone, is 2.1 metres (6 ft 11 in) high with a panel of interlace decoration on the east face, a broken mortise slot at the top and a plinth at the bottom.

== Excavations ==
In 1849 the Exeter Diocesan Architectural Society carried out excavations around the stones and discovered a hidden vault beneath them. Mr Charles Spence published in the Transactions of that society a paper entitled Iter Cornubiense in which he details the proceedings of the work. After raising Doniert's stone and placing it in an erect position, a mass of granite no less than two tons and a half in weight, the workmen were directed to dig down by the side of the other monolith. After reaching a depth of about eight or nine feet a hole was discovered. Here they found a cruciform vault eighteen feet in length from east to west and sixteen from north to south the width of the vault being about four feet. The sides were perpendicular and the roof circular and all smoothed with a tool and as level as the rough nature of the naked rock would permit. The men employed for this task came from South Caradon mine. It was reported that the miners said that it was "nothing but old workings in other words ancient mine works."

The underground rock-cut chamber begins as a passage about 8 metres (26 ft) to the south east of the crosses, turns into a tunnel and ends as a cruciform chamber beneath the crosses. The relationship between the underground chamber and the crosses is unknown.

The site is managed by the Cornwall Heritage Trust on behalf of English Heritage. Vehicles can park in a layby adjoining the site, entry is free and the site can be visited at any reasonable time during daylight hours.

== See also ==
- Pillar of Eliseg, a contemporary monument in the kingdom of Powys, Wales
