= Essayez =

Single by Johnny Hallyday

from the album Vie
- Language: French
- English title: Try
- B-side: "C'est écrit sur les murs"
- Released: December 1970
- Studio: Olympic Studios, London; Studio des Dames, Paris
- Genre: Rock; chanson
- Length: 4:24
- Label: Philips
- Songwriter(s): Philippe Labro; Micky Jones; Tommy Brown
- Producer(s): Lee Hallyday

Johnny Hallyday singles chronology
"Deux amis pour un amour" (1970)	"Essayez" (1970)	"Oh! Ma jolie Sarah" (1971)

Music video
- "Essayez" (official live, 1971) on YouTube

"Essayez" ("Try") is a song by French singer Johnny Hallyday. It was released on his 1970 studio album Vie as the album's third and final single in December 1970.

== Composition and writing ==
The song was written by Philippe Labro, Micky Jones, and Tommy Brown. The recording was produced by Lee Hallyday. The single was backed by "C'est écrit sur les murs" ("It's written on the walls").

== Commercial performance ==
In France the single spent two weeks at number 1 on the singles sales chart (in December 1970).

== Track listing ==
7" single Philips 6009 122 (1970, France etc.)

A. "Essayez" (4:24)
B. "C'est écrit sur les murs" (3:40)

== Charts ==
Chart (1970–1971)	Peak position
Belgium (Ultratop 50 Wallonia)	14
France (Singles Sales)	1
