= Oh! Ma jolie Sarah =

Single by Johnny Hallyday

from the album Flagrant délit
- Language: French
- English title: Oh! My pretty Sarah
- B-side: "Que j'aie tort ou raison"
- Released: 5 April 1971
- Recorded: March–April 1971
- Studio: Olympic Studios, London
- Genre: Rock
- Length: 4:47
- Label: Philips
- Composers: Mick Jones, Tommy Brown
- Lyricist: Philippe Labro
- Producer: Lee Halliday

Johnny Hallyday singles chronology
"Essayez" (1970)	"Oh! Ma jolie Sarah" (1971)	"Fils de personne" (1971)

Music video
- "Oh! Ma jolie Sarah" (live, 1971) on YouTube

"Oh! Ma jolie Sarah" ("Oh! My pretty Sarah") is a song by French singer Johnny Hallyday. It was released in April 1971 as the lead single of Hallyday's 1971 studio album Flagrant délit ("In the act"). Written by Philippe Labro, Tommy Brown and Mick Jones, "Oh! Ma jolie Sarah" is one of the great successes of Hallyday, who regularly included the song his tours.

== History ==
Philippe Labro is the first author to write all the lyrics for a Johnny Hallyday album. Recorded in London, the album "Flagrant délit" was released on 19 June 1971. "Oh! Ma jolie Sarah", the flagship title of the opus, precedes it and is broadcast on the airwaves and in 45 rpm from April. Its success was immediate and the title was one of the biggest hits of the 1970s. "Oh! Ma jolie Sarah", from September, one of the highlights of Hallyday’s show on the stage of the Palais des sports in Paris; more rhythmic, in a longer version, surrounded by his backing vocalists Madeline Bell, Doris Troy, Juanita Franklin and Nanette Workman, Hallyday made the song last more than six minutes. The hit remained on Hallyday's tours until 1974. Absent for several years, it reappeared in the singer's repertoire at a Palais des sports in 1982. Hallyday regularly performed the song. The single was backed by "Que j'aie tort ou raison" ("Whether I'm right or wrong").

== Commercial performance ==
The song spent five consecutive weeks at no. 1 on the singles sales chart in France (from 27 May to 30 June 1971).

== Charts ==
Chart (1971)	Peak position
Belgium (Ultratop 50 Wallonia)	4
France (singles sales)	1
