= Dupath Well =

Building in Callington, Cornwall, England

- Fenten Hynsladron (Cornish)
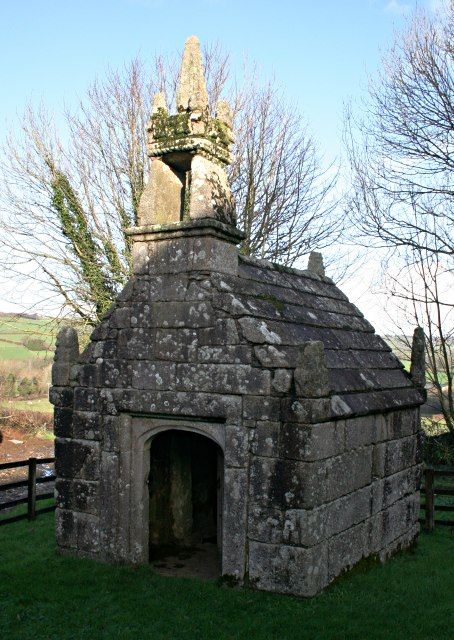

- Location within Cornwall
- 50.50016°N 4.29270°W
- Location: Callington, Cornwall, England

History
- Built: 1510

Listed Building – Grade I
- Official name: Dupath Well
- Designated: 21 July 1951
- Reference no.: 1140066

Scheduled monument
- Official name: Dupath holy well, 45m NNE of Dupath Farm
- Designated: 10 August 1923
- Reference no.: 1013663

Dupath Well (Cornish: Fenten Hynsladron) is a holy well house and chapel dedicated to St. Ethelred, constructed over a spring. It is a Grade I listed building, having been added to the register on 21 July 1951.

Dupath Well is located at grid reference SX 374 693, just outside the town of Callington in east Cornwall, United Kingdom. It is under the guardianship of Historic England, and managed by the Cornwall Heritage Trust.

== The structure ==
Dupath Well is a nearly intact well-house, constructed of local granite, built over a spring. Built of Cornish granite ashlar, it has a steeply pitched corbelled roof, built from courses of granite slabs that run the length of the building. There are badly weathered pinnacles at each corner and a small bell turret with a highly elaborate canopy, possibly a later addition, over the entrance. Next to the well house is a medieval, circular trough that collects the spring water.

== History ==
The small chapel-like building was probably built in about 1510 by the Augustinian canons of the nearby priory of St Germans, to whom the site belonged. The architecture of the well-house is typical of the late 15th and early 16th centuries in a notably 'Celtic' style bearing comparison with similar well houses and ancient chapels in Brittany and Ireland, albeit in a late medieval elaborated form.

At one time the spring at Dupath was believed to cure whooping cough, and it has been suggested that, in addition to its role in healing the sick, the spring may have been used on occasion for baptisms. One grim tale associated with Dupath recounts that two Saxons – Colan (Cornish for heart or courage) and Gottlieb – fought a duel there for a lady’s hand. But the maiden went unmarried: Colan was killed outright and Gottlieb fatally wounded, though some versions say he died later of ‘impatience’.
