= Jésus Christ (song) =

Single by Johnny Hallyday

from the album Vie
- Language: French
- A-side: "On me recherche"
- Released: 25 April 1970
- Recorded: 17–18 March 1970
- Studio: Studio Polydor, Paris
- Genre: Folk rock, chanson
- Length: 3:15
- Label: Philips
- Songwriters: Philippe Labro, Eddie Vartan
- Producer: Lee Hallyday

Johnny Hallyday singles chronology
"Ceux que l'amour a blessé" (1970)	"Jésus Christ" (1970)	"Deux amis pour un amour" (1970)

"Jésus Christ" is a song by French singer Johnny Hallyday. It was released in April 1970 and recorded the prior month. The song was controversial upon its release for its portrayal of Jesus as a Hippie. The song was written by Journalist Philippe Labro and bandleader and Hallyday's brother-in-law Eddie Vartan.

== History ==
The idea for the song came to Labro after a trip to the United States: “I had noticed a striking resemblance between the hippie movement and something of Jesus Christ, I told myself that if he came back today, Jesus Christ would definitely be a hippie. [...] Although I had never written a song in my life, I wrote the text [...], I showed it to Eddie [Vartan] (Hallyday's brother-in-law and producer) and told him, either we give it to a little singer and the song will remain in a parallel circuit [...]; either we offer it to the most listened to singer, the most representative of his generation, Johnny Hallyday and something will inevitably happen. Johnny immediately understood the importance of this text... And it didn't fail. », When it was released, the scandal was immediate, the song was banned at the OTRF and on the radios (Europe No. 1 resisted and despite everything broadcast the title seven times in the same day, so that on France Inter Michel Droit severely criticized the song, which he considered unconscious as well as indecent and approved of the censorship that hit it), while several stores removed the record from their shelves. A censorship which has the effect of boosting sales. However, the controversy did not subside and debates were organized between high dignitaries of the Catholic Church and Philippe Labro (the author and interpreter were then threatened by the Vatican with excommunication). In fact, several bishops actually took the request up to the Vatican, but no official response was ever adopted. Learning this, Hallyday reaffirms his faith and specifies that he is certain that Jesus has forgiven him. "Jesus Christ" is on the singing tour of Hallyday's summer and fall tour. In November and December, in the West Indies and in Canada it is a poster which presents him mustachioed and bare-chested crucified on a guitar which creates emotion. After turmoil in Pointe-à-Pitre, the Canadian stages were also punctuated by several incidents. The song was no longer performed by the artist on stage; however, another title, in 1982, Golden Calf, Voodoo, once again alludes to a hippie Jesus: “[...] The young hippie from Bethlehem who fought with flowers, you demolished him yourself- same..." (album La Peur, "The Fear").

== Commercial performance ==
The song spent 11 weeks at no. 1 on the singles sales chart in France (from 2 to 26 August and from 26 September to 4 October 1970).

== Charts ==
Chart (1970)	Peak position
France (singles sales)	1
