= Deux amis pour un amour =

Single by Johnny Hallyday

from the album Vie
- Language: French
- English title: Two friends for one love
- B-side: "Rendez-moi le soleil"
- Released: 18 September 1970
- Genre: Rock, chanson
- Length: 3:33
- Label: Philips
- Songwriter(s): Roger Dumas, Jean-Jacques Debout
- Producer(s): Lee Hallyday

Johnny Hallyday singles chronology
"Jésus Christ" (1970)	"Deux amis pour un amour" (1970)	"Essayez" (1970)

Music video
- "Deux amis pour un amour" (French TV, 1970) on YouTube

"Deux amis pour un amour" ("Two friends for one love") is a song by French singer Johnny Hallyday. It was released as the second and penultimate single off of his 1970 studio album Vie.

== Composition and writing ==
The song was written by Roger Dumas and Jean-Jacques Debout. The recording was produced by Lee Hallyday. The single was backed by "Rendez-moi le soleil" ("Give me the sun").

== Commercial performance ==
In France the single spent three weeks at no. 1 on the singles sales chart (in October–November 1970).

== Track listing ==
7" single Philips 6009 089 (1970, France etc.)

A. "Deux amis pour un amour" (3:33)
B. "Rendez-moi le soleil" (3:10)

== Charts ==
Chart (1970)	Peak position
France (Singles Sales)	1
