= The Pipers =

Standing stones on Bodmin Moor in Cornwall, England

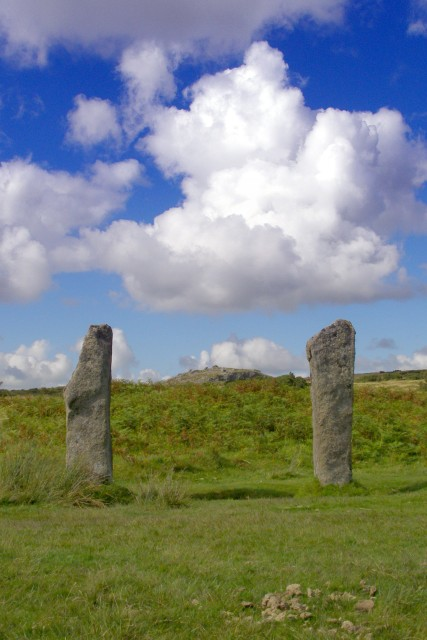
- The Pipers standing stones on Bodmin Moor with a view of Stowe's Hill

- Location within Cornwall
- 50.5155°N 4.4599°W
- Location: Bodmin Moor, Cornwall

The Pipers are a pair of standing stones near The Hurlers stone circles, located on Bodmin Moor near the village of Minions, Cornwall, UK. They share the name with another pair of standing stones near the Merry Maidens to the south of the village of St Buryan, also in Cornwall.

== Description ==
The Pipers are approximately 2 metres high and the width between them is about the same distance. They are situated about 120 metres west-south-west of the central Hurlers circle. According to folklore they represent musicians playing for three circles of dancers who were turned to stone for engaging in festivities on a holy day.

The area around the Pipers is notable in archaeology for the discovery of a bronze dagger and gold beaker along with some beads and flint at Rillaton Barrow in 1818, approximately 550 m north of the Pipers.
