= Tremar Coombe =

Coordinates: 50.491°N 4.462°W

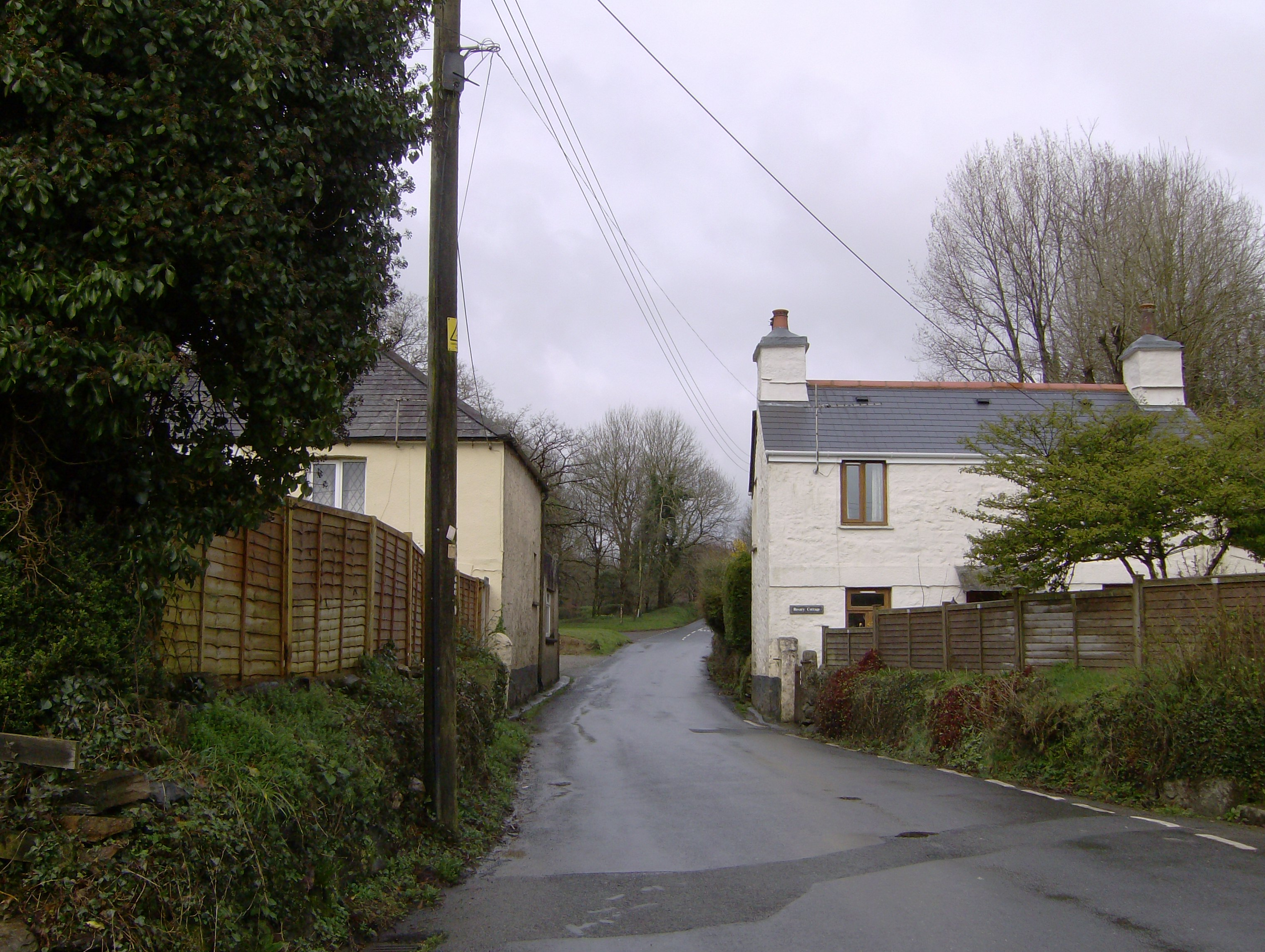
This narrow road from Lower Tremar provides access to the hamlet of Tremar Coombe.

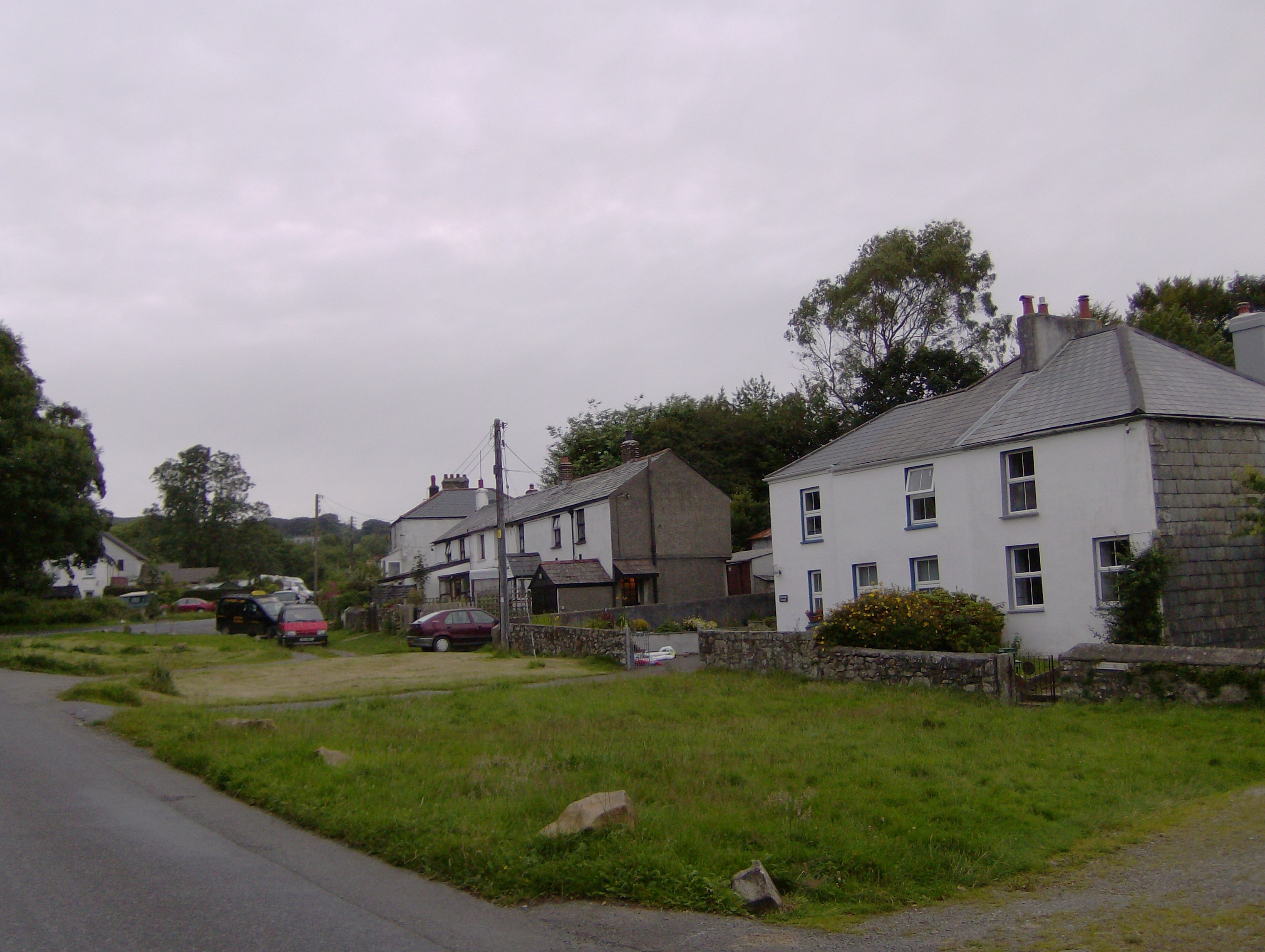
Houses at the southern end of Tremar Coombe.

Tremar Coombe is a small hamlet situated in the former Caradon District north of Liskeard in Cornwall. "Tremar" ("Trevargh") means "Mark's farm" or "Horse farm" in Cornish. It is considered an "industrial settlement" in that it was largely constructed during the mid-nineteenth century to accommodate workers at nearby mines and quarries and their families. The prefix Tre in Cornish stands for farm or homestead, and the word coombe comes from old English cumb, a narrow valley or deep hollow.

== See also ==
- Tremar
