= Mardi Gras (band) =

American rock and roll group

Mardi Gras was an American, New York based, rock and roll group. They released several singles which were hits throughout Europe from 1970 to 1972, followed by an eponymous album in 1972, on Peter Anders and Vini Poncia's Map City Records label. The core of the group was three friends, Lou Burgio, Bob Azzara, and Flip Cesario, who had performed in other bands, including the Royal Teens and Joey and the Twisters in the early 1960s.

Their first release, a cover of "Girl, I've Got News for You," reached number 1 in France, and moved high up the charts in Italy, the Netherlands, Spain, and elsewhere in Europe. They followed this with a cover of "Too Busy Thinking About My Baby," which again charted highly across Europe, including peaking at number 19 in the UK Singles Chart in 1972. They released two other singles, "Every Day I Have to Cry Some" (1971), and "Paris Sunshine" (1972), soon after issuing their only album.

They recorded one more record, backing the French singer, Michel Laurent, on "Sing Sing Barbara" which reached number 1 across parts of Europe, staying at the top of the charts in Italy for six consecutive months.

== Members ==
- Lou Burgio - Vocals, drums
- Bob Azzara - Farfisa organ, vocals
- Flip Cesario - Guitar, vocals
- Noel Koward - Vibes, vocals

== Discography ==
=== Albums ===
- Mardi Gras (1970)
  - "Girl, I've Got News For You"
  - "Everyday I Have To Cry Some"
  - "Come Along"
  - "Letter Of Recommendation"
  - "I Just Can't Help Believing"
  - "Too Busy Thinking About My Baby"
  - "Hold Me"
  - "The Days"
  - "I Was Born Again"

=== Singles ===
- "Girl, I've Got News For You" / "If I Can't Have You" (1970)
- "Too Busy Thinking About My Baby" / "Letter of Recommendation" (1970)
- "Every Day I Have to Cry Some" / "The Days" (1971)
- "Paris Sunshine" / "Give Me A Little Sign" (1972)
- Laurent et Mardi Gras: "Sing Sing Barbara" (1972) (Issued in English, French and Italian versions. Note the B-side was "Le Temple Bleu" by Laurent only)

== See also ==
- List of French number-one hits of 1970
