= Que je t'aime =

1969 single by Johnny Hallyday

Single by Johnny Hallyday

from the album Que je t'aime
- Language: French
- English title: How I love you
- B-side: "Voyage Au Pays Des Vivants"
- Released: 23 June 1969
- Recorded: 29 April 1969
- Studio: Studio Polydor, Paris
- Genre: Pop rock
- Length: 3:22
- Label: Philips – 437.480 BE
- Composer: Jean Renard
- Lyricist: Gilles Thibaut

Johnny Hallyday singles chronology
"Je suis né dans la rue" (1969)	"Que je t'aime" (1969)	"Ceux que l'amour a blessé" (1970)

Johnny Hallyday singles chronology
"L'Envie" (1988)	"Que je t'aime" (1988)	"Mirador" (1989)

Live cover

Music video
- "Que je t'aime" (Live at Bercy, 1987) on YouTube

"Que je t'aime" ("How I love you") is a song by French singer Johnny Hallyday. It was released on 23 June 1969 in France and on 11 September 1969 in Italy. The music has been composed in one night by the French artist Jean Renard, the lyrics have been written by Gilles Thibaut. Johnny Hallyday was looking for a strong song for his new show at Le palais des Sports. The song is a success, loved or at least known by most of the French population. The hardcore fans of Hallyday, the rock and roll' fans but also people from a more pop music atmosphere.

== Commercial performance ==
In 1969 the song spent 11 weeks at no. 1 on the singles sales chart in France (from 2 to 26 August and from 26 September to 4 October).

In 1988 a live version of the song recorded at Palais de Bercy in 1987 was released as a single from Hallyday's 1988 live album Johnny à Bercy. When Hallyday performed it on stage during the Bercy performances, a video of a young woman undressing completely was projected on the back wall. The young woman in the video was French actress Sandrine Caron.

== Covers ==
- 1969 - The Combos (single), with the title Quanto ti amo, lyrics by Bruno Lauzi, (Combo – HP 8046)
- 1970 - Bobby Solo, with the title Quanto t'amo, lyrics by Bruno Lauzi, album Bobby Folk (Dischi Ricordi - SMRL 6065), published in Italy, Spain, Germany, Japan and Brazil
- 1970 - Caravelli, album Quanto ti amo (CBS – S 63832), published in Italy, France, Canada, Portugal and The Netherlands
- 1970 - Gionchetta (single), with the title Quanto ti amo, lyrics by Bruno Lauzi, (Junior – JR 0062)

== Charts ==
Chart (1969)	Peak position
Belgium (Ultratop 50 Wallonia)	1
France (singles sales)	1
Chart (2000)	Peak position
France (SNEP)	34
Chart (2009)	Peak position
Belgium (Ultratop Back Catalogue Singles)	1
