= St Breock Downs Monolith =

Prehistoric standing stone in Cornwall, England

- Men Gurta
- St Breock Longstone
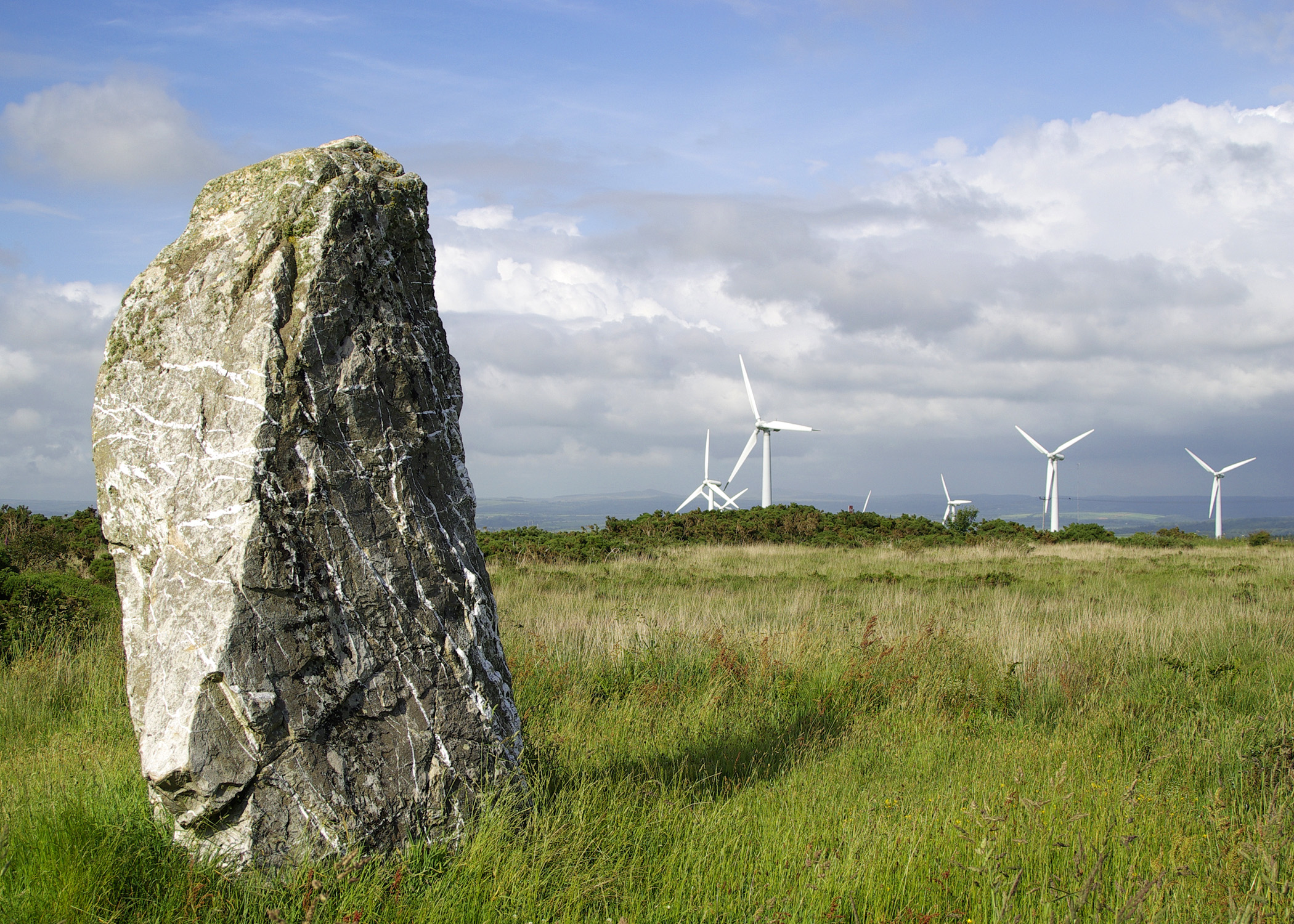
- The stone in 2009

- Location in England, United Kingdom
- 50°28′45.54″N 4°51′56.28″W
- Type: Standing stone (megalith)
- Location: England, United Kingdom

History
- Built: c. 2000 BC

Site notes
- Material: Shale
- Height: c. 3 meters
- Length: 4.92 m (16.1 ft)
- Public access: Yes

St Breock Downs Monolith (or St Breock Longstone; Cornish: Men Gurta) is the largest and heaviest prehistoric Menhir in Cornwall, England. It stands on the summit of St Breock Downs.

== Description ==
The stone is made from the local Devonian shale which has extensive feldspar veining, and it is estimated to weigh around 16.5 tonnes. It is 4.92 metres long and stands to a height of just over 3 metres above ground level. It stands on a low stone mound or cairn with a diameter of around 10 metres. It is believed to be Late Neolithic or Early Bronze Age (around 2500-1500 BC).

It fell over in 1945, and was re-erected in 1956 after a small excavation had been carried out. The excavation showed that the stone stood in a setting of quartz pebbles below which were two small hollows. Similar hollows at other sites have been found to contain human bone or ashes.

The stone may have been associated with other Bronze Age ritual monuments in the area, including one other standing stone, and a series of barrows that extend up to 4 miles (7 km) to the west.

The stone is mentioned in antiquarian records as early as 1613, and was later adopted as a St Breock parish boundary marker. The site is now in the care of the Cornwall Heritage Trust on behalf of English Heritage.
