= Voici les clés =

"Voici les clés" (lit. "Here Are The Keys") is a French cover version of the Italian song "Nel cuore nei sensi" which was written in 1976 by Vito Pallavicini and Toto Cutugno and originally performed by the group Albatros. It was translated into French and credited to Pierre Delanoë, Vito Pallavicini and Toto Cutugno.

== Gérard Lenorman version ==
"Voici les clés"

Single by Gérard Lenorman

from the album Drôles de chansons
- Released: 1976
- Recorded: 1976
- Genre: Pop
- Length: 3:35
- Songwriters: Vito Pallavicini, Toto Cutugno; French lyrics: Pierre Delanoë
- Producer: Jean-Jacques Souplet

"Voici les clés" is a track performed in French by Gérard Lenorman and released in Europe in 1976. It was included on his 1976 album, Drôles de chansons ("Funny Songs").

=== 7" single (CBS 4913) ===
1. "Voici les clés" – 3:45
2. "Comme une chanson bizarre" – 5:45

=== Charts ===
Chart (1976)	Peak position
Belgium (Ultratop 50 Wallonia)	3
Netherlands (Dutch Top 40)	2

== Toto Cutugno / Albatros version ==
Italian singer Toto Cutugno and his group Albatros originally wrote and sung Nel cuore nei sensi and included it on their first album Volo AZ504 in 1976. Then, in 1990, Toto Cutugno re-recorded the song twice in Italian and in French to be included on 1990's LP/CD Insieme 1992. Insieme 1992 was released for both the Italian and French markets respectively. The song was once again re-recorded in Italian for the 2004 compilation Cantando, which featured a compilation Cutugno's material and was released in connection with the 2004 season of Star Academy in France.

== Gérard Lenorman and Tina Arena version ==
"Voici les clés"

Single by Gérard Lenorman featuring Tina Arena

from the album Duos de mes chansons
- Released: 10 October 2011
- Recorded: 2011
- Genre: Pop
- Length: 3:30
- Songwriters: Vito Pallavicinim Toto Cutugno; French lyrics:Pierre Delanoë
- Producers: Christian Lachenal and Benjamin Constant

Tina Arena singles chronology
"Oh Me, Oh My" (2008)	"Voici les clés" (2011)	"You Set Fire to My Life" (2013)

In 2011, Lemorman re-recorded "Voici les clés" with Australian recording artist Tina Arena for his album Duos de mes chansons, which translates from French as "Duets of my songs".

=== Promo CD ===
1. "Voici les clés" performed by Gérard Lenorman featuring Tina Arena – 3:30

=== Charts ===
Released only in France, it charted at number 48.

Chart (2011)	Peak position
French Singles Chart	48
