= Ceux que l'amour a blessés =

Single by Johnny Hallyday
- Language: French
- English title: Those whom love has hurt
- B-side: "Si tu pars"
- Released: 12 January 1970
- Length: 3:37
- Label: Philips
- Songwriters: Jean Renard, Gilles Thibaut
- Producer: Lee Hallyday

Johnny Hallyday singles chronology
"Que je t'aime" (1969)	"Ceux que l'amour a blessés" (1970)	"Jésus Christ" (1970)

"Ceux que l'amour a blessés" ("Those whom love has hurt") is a song by French singer Johnny Hallyday. It was released as a single in January 1970.

== Composition and writing ==
The song was written by Jean Renard and Gilles Thibaut. The recording was produced by Lee Hallyday.

== Commercial performance ==
In France the single spent three weeks at no. 1 on the singles sales chart (in February–March 1970).

== Track listing ==
7" single Philips 336.292 BF (1970, France etc.)

A. "Ceux que l'amour a blessés" (3:37)
B. "Si tu pars" (4:05)

== Charts ==
Chart (1970)	Peak position
France (Singles Sales)	1
