= Gérard Lenorman =

French singer-songwriter (born 1945)

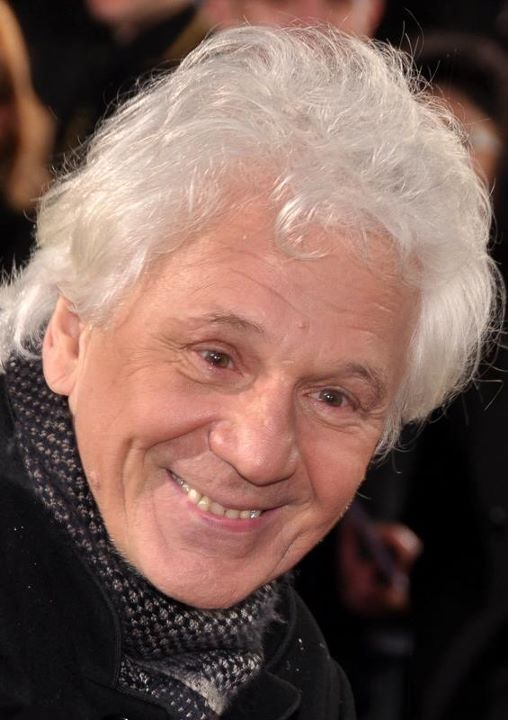
- Lenorman in 2012

Background information
- Born: Gérard Christian Éric Lenormand; 9 February 1945 (age 81); Bénouville, France
- Genre: Chanson française
- Occupation: Singer-songwriter
- Years active: 1967–present
- Labels: CBS; Carrere
- Website: www.gerard-lenorman.com

Gérard Lenorman (born 9 February 1945) is a French singer-songwriter.

Lenorman was born at the Château de Bénouville, Calvados (Normandy) when it was a maternity hospital. He is the son of Madeleine Lenormand and an unknown German soldier. Lenorman has four children with his ex-wife Caroline: Mathieu, Justine, Clémence and Victor. He released his first album in 1969.

In 1988, he represented France in the Eurovision Song Contest in Dublin, Ireland, reaching tenth place with "Chanteur de charme". Lenorman was very popular in France and Francophonie, during the 1970s and early 1980s. In 1994, a compilation of his hits Vos plus belles chansons went gold in France. In 2007, he released a biography entitled Je suis né à vingt ans ("I was born at the age of 20") in which the singer explains the unknown identity of his father.

== Discography ==
=== Albums ===
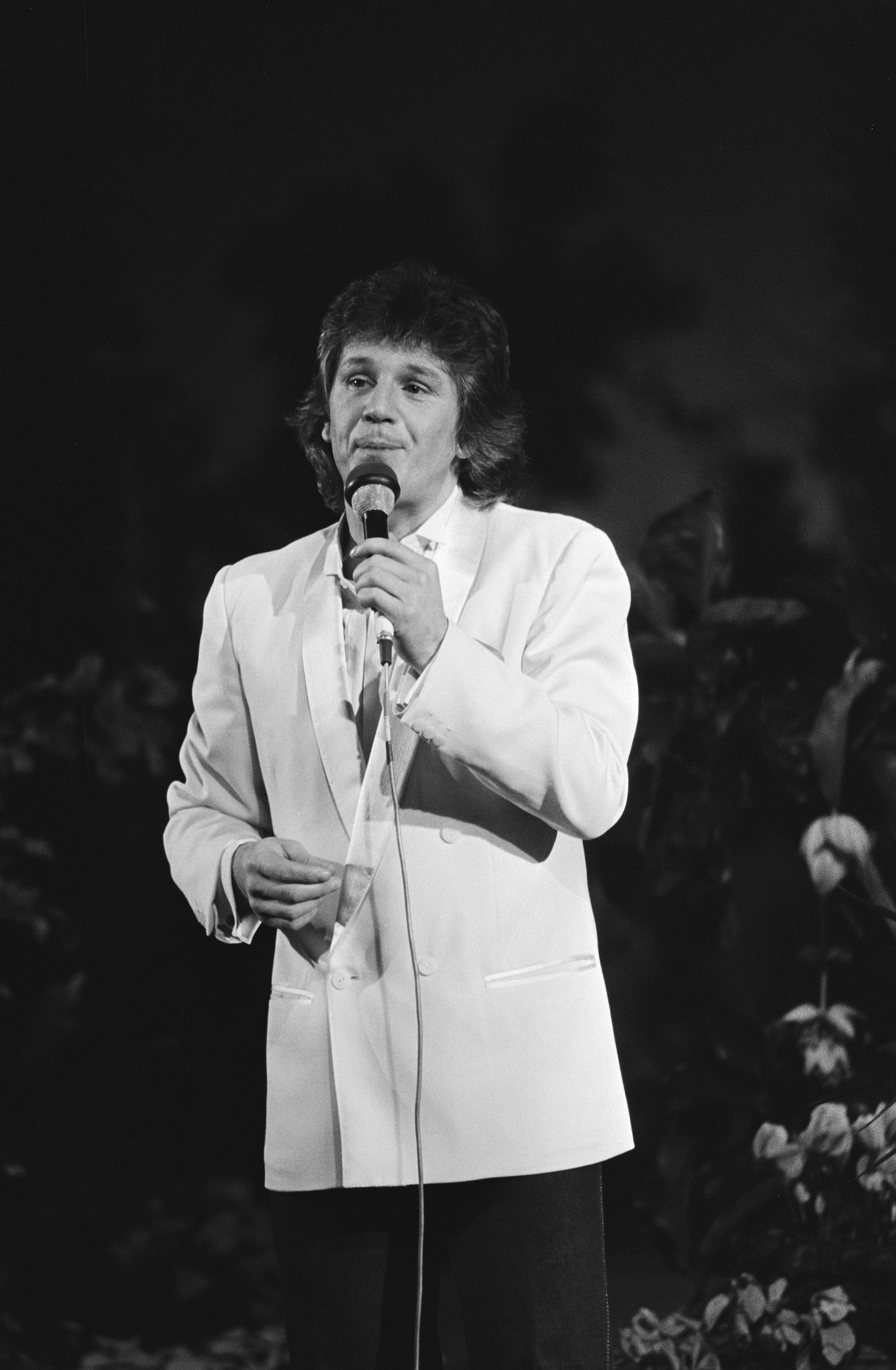
Lenorman in 1982

- Gérard Lenorman (1969)
- Les matins d'hiver (1972)
- Quelque chose et moi (1974)
- Caroline (1975)
- Olympia 75 (1975)
- Drôles de chansons (1976)
- Noëls du monde (1976)
- Au-delà des rêves (1977)
- Nostalgies (1978)
- Boulevard de l'océan (1979)
- Olympia 79 (1979)
- La clairière de l'enfance (1980)
- ...D'amour (1981)
- Paris sur Scène – Palais des congrès (1982)
- Le soleil des tropiques (1983)
- Fière et nippone (1985)
- Heureux qui communique (1988)
- Bravo à Gérard Lenorman (1989)
- Il y a... (1993)
- Vos plus belles chansons (1994)
- Les plus belles chansons françaises (1996)
- Le monde de Gérard Lenorman (Triple compilation) 1998)
- La raison de l'autre (2000)
- Gérard Lenorman en concert (2003)
- Le Best Of (2007)
- Duos de mes chansons (2011)

=== Songs ===
- "Si j'étais président"
- "Gentil dauphin triste"
- "Michèle"
- "Si tu ne me laisses pas tomber"
- "Soldats, ne tirez pas"
- "L'enfant des cathédrales"
- "Je vous écris"
- "Le Petit Prince"
- "Nicolas"
- "Voici les clés" (with Tina Arena)
- "La ballade des gens heureux"
- "Montfort-L'Amaury"

Preceded by Christine Minier; Les mots d'amour n'ont pas de dimanche	France in the Eurovision Song Contest; 1988	Succeeded by Nathalie Pâque; J'ai volé la vie
