= Michèle (song) =

- 7" vinyl single cover

Single by Gérard Lenorman

from the album Drôles de chansons
- B-side: "Et je t'aime"
- Released: 1976
- Genre: Chanson, pop
- Length: 3:08
- Label: CBS
- Songwriters: Didier Barbelivien, Michel Cywie
- Composer: Gérard Lenorman
- Producer: Jean-Jacques Souplet

Music video
- "Michèle" (TF1, 1976) on YouTube

"Michèle" is a song by French singer Gérard Lenorman released in early 1976 as the first single from his album Drôles de chansons.

The song tells the story of two Parisian high school students who experience their first love between the ages of 15 and 17.

== Composition ==
The lyrics were written by Didier Barbelivien and are autobiographical. The music was composed by Michel Cywie.

Originally, the song was to be titled "Marcelle", but when Barbelivien showed it to Lenorman, the singer instantly decided to rename it to "Michèle" as a tribute to The Beatles and also because, as he said, the name "goes so well with the song". At first, the lyricist declined, saying that Michèle was his aunt's name. Lenorman recalls: "I'm replying to him that, well, it is not my aunt's name and that 'Marcelle' won't do it at all." Then, Barbelivien said he was worried about the similarity to the title of The Beatles' song "Michelle". But Lenorman insisted and assured the lyricist that "in six months The Beatles will be so over".

In fact, the song has been mistaken for a cover of The Beatles' "Michelle". Moreover, its lyrics mention The Beatles' song "Yesterday".

== Reception ==
The song spent 13 weeks on the French chart in February–May 1976.

== Charts ==
Chart (1976)	Peak position
Belgium (Ultratop 50 Wallonia)	5
