= Leny Escudero =

French singer-songwriter of Spanish origin

Leny Escudero (full name: Joaquin Leni Escudero; 1932, Espinal, Spain – 2015, Giverny, France) was a French singer-songwriter of Spanish origin. He met with success in the early 1960s, with songs like "Ballade à Sylvie", "Pour une amourette" and "À Malypense".
