= La Ballade des gens heureux =

- 7" vinyl single cover

Single by Gérard Lenorman

from the album Olympia 75
- A-side: "La Ballade des gens heureux"
- B-side: "Le Funambule"
- Released: 1975
- Genre: Chanson, pop
- Length: 3:16
- Label: CBS Disques
- Composer(s): Gérard Lenorman
- Lyricist(s): Pierre Delanoë
- Producer(s): Jean-Jacques Souplet

Gérard Lenorman singles chronology
| "Sur le chemin de la vie" (1974) | "La Ballade des gens heureux" (1975) | "Et moi je chante" (1975) |

Music video
- "La ballade des gens heureux" (French TV, 1975) on YouTube

"La Ballade des gens heureux" (translation: The Ballad of the Happy People) is a song by Gérard Lenorman, released in 1975. English singer and songwriter Jonathan King wrote the British lyrics and had a hit with it as The Happy People Song.

== Charts ==
| Chart (1976) | Peak position |
|---|---|
| Belgium (Ultratop 50 Flanders) | 6 |
| France (IFOP) | 3 |
| Netherlands (Single Top 100) | 2 |
| West Germany (GfK) | 42 |
