= St Cleer =

Village and civil parish in Cornwall, England

Coordinates: 50°29′12″N 4°28′20″W

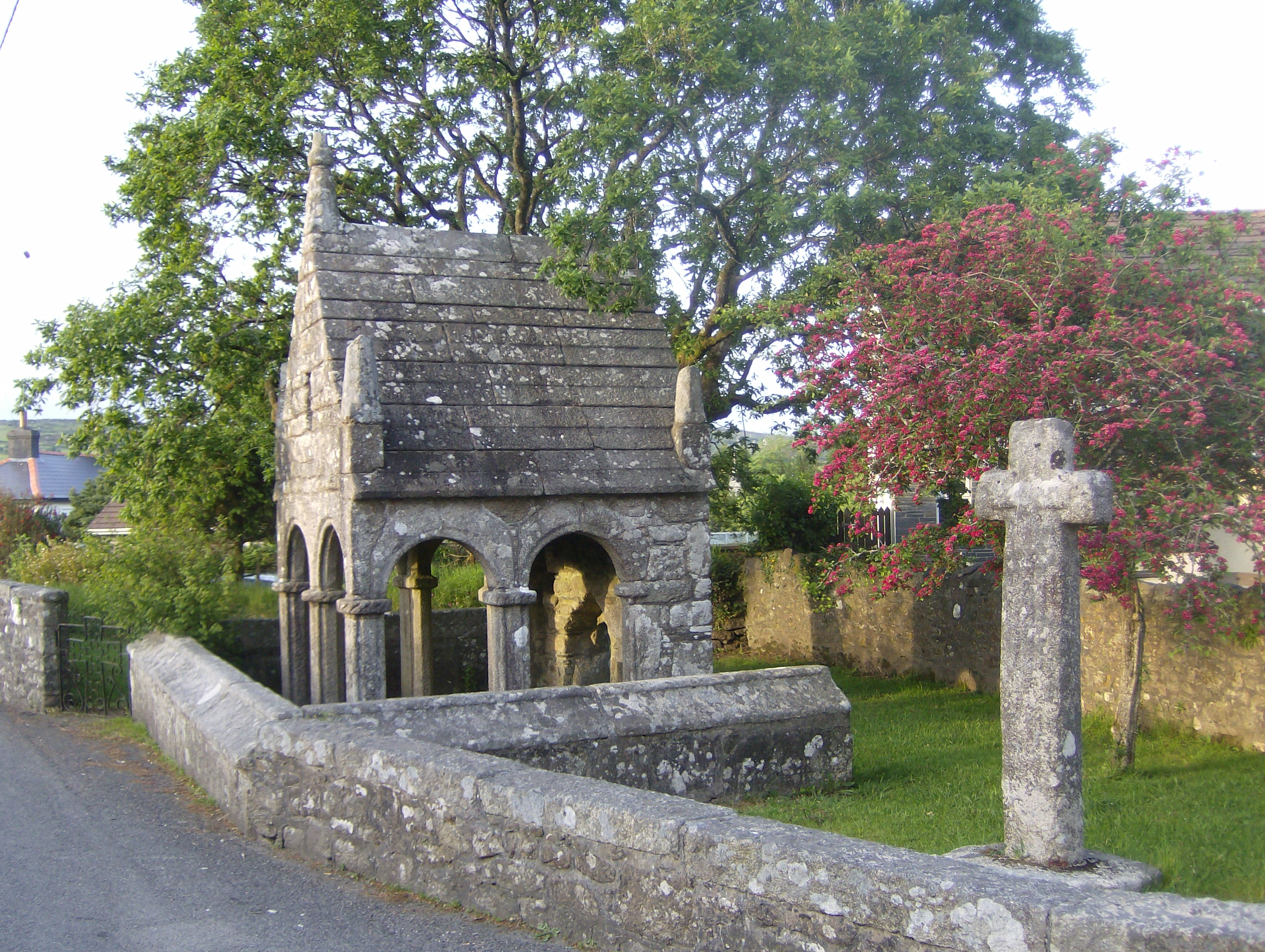
St Cleer holy well

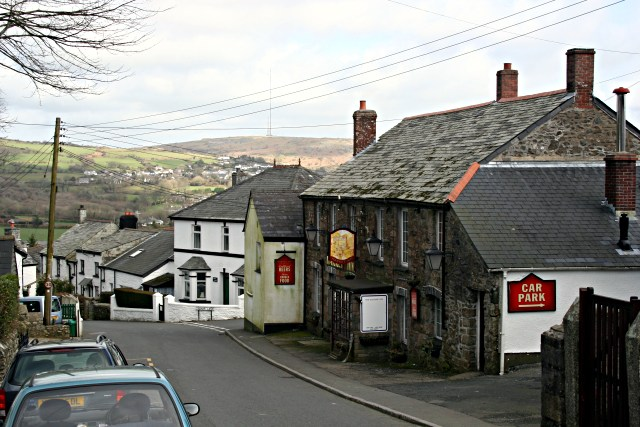
St Cleer

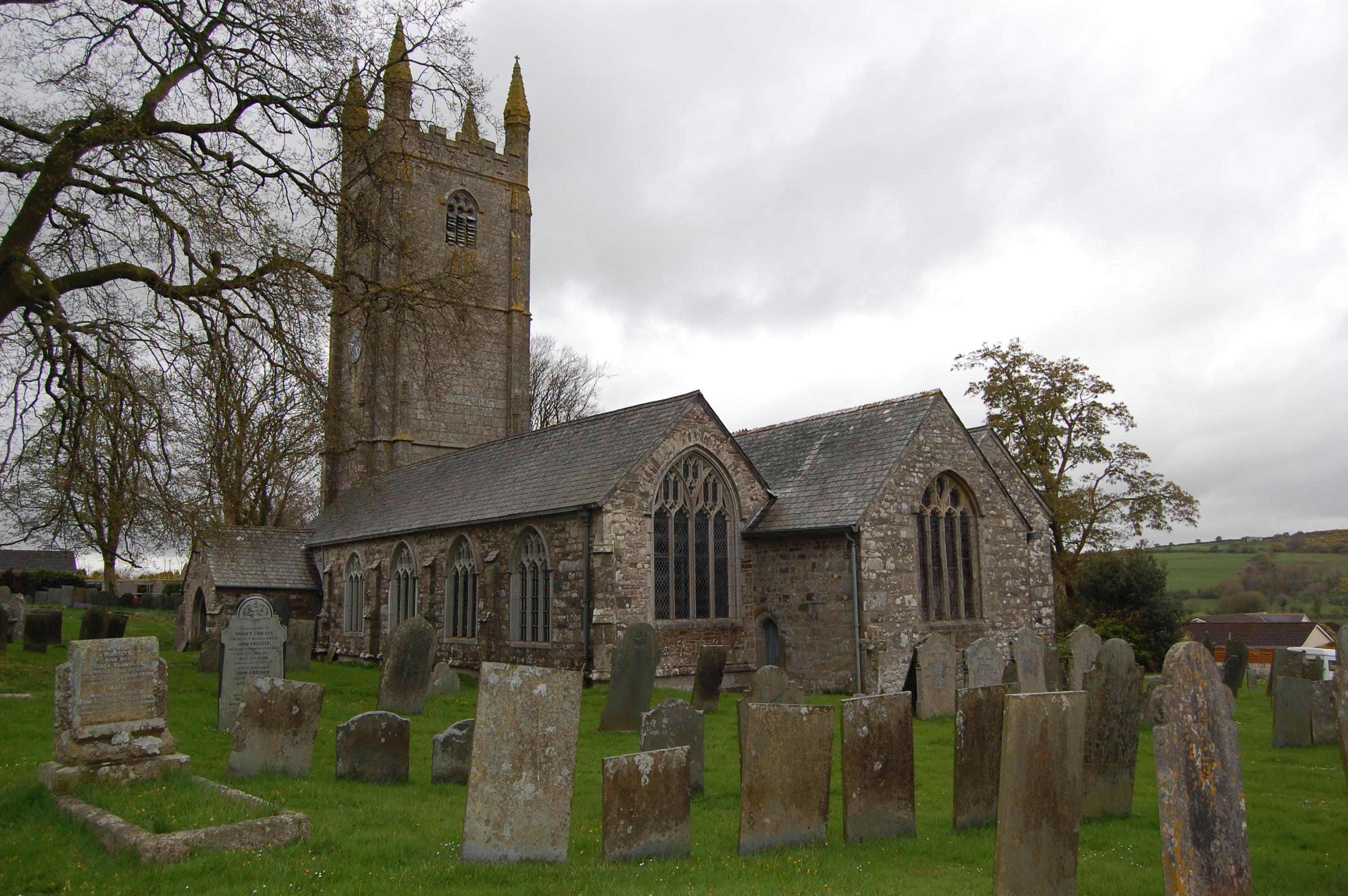
St Cleer Parish Church

St Cleer (Cornish: Ryskarasek) is a civil parish and village in east Cornwall, England, United Kingdom. The village is situated on the southeast flank of Bodmin Moor approximately two miles (3 km) north of Liskeard. The population of the parish in 2001 numbered 3257. This includes Common Moor and had increased to 3,297 at the 2011 census. An electoral ward also exists. The population at the 2011 census is 4,366.

== Parish church ==
St Cleer parish church, at an elevation of approximately 690 feet (210 metres), is dedicated to Saint Clarus. Its three-stage tower is 97 feet (30 metres) high and contains a ring of six bells. The church was first built in 800 but rebuilt in the 13th century. The tower suffered damage and was repaired in the 15th century. The church is a Grade I listed building, having been so designated on 21 August 1964. It is of Norman origin, with early fifteenth century additions, further substantial additions in the late fifteenth century and late nineteenth century restorations. It is constructed of granite rubble. The roofs are slated with ridge tiles, and crested ridge tiles over the nave and chancel. The only remaining Norman work is a doorway whose ornamentation was reduced when it was resited in the north wall. The tower is at the west end and built of regular granite blocks; it is a fine example of 15th-century architecture. The aisles are of four bays and the arcades are different: the north arcade is the earlier and simpler while the south arcade is of Polyphant stone piers. The south aisle windows are Perpendicular but those of the north aisle are straight topped and of a later date. The nave, aisles and south porch have wagon roofs of the 15th-16th cent. The restoration of 1904 by G. H. Fellowes-Prynne included the reredos, altar front, rood and parclose screens, choir stalls and bench ends. The font dates from the 13th century and has niche ornamentation on each side. The chancel has two chancel aisles (15th cent.) and a wagon roof and wooden chancel arch (19th. cent.).

St Clarus was an Englishman who went to Cornwall to preach to the inhabitants in the 8th century. He founded the church of St Cleer and lived a saintly life nearby. However, he rejected the advances of a local chieftainess who had fallen in love with him and when she continued to pester him he fled to France where he lived in an isolated hermitage. The enraged woman had him pursued and then murdered. The place he had lived was afterwards named Saint-Clair-sur-Epte. The saint's feast day is 4 November. He should not be confused with two French saints of the same name: Clair of Nantes and Clair of Albi (first bishop of Albi; also Clair of Aquitaine).

== Prehistoric and medieval remains ==
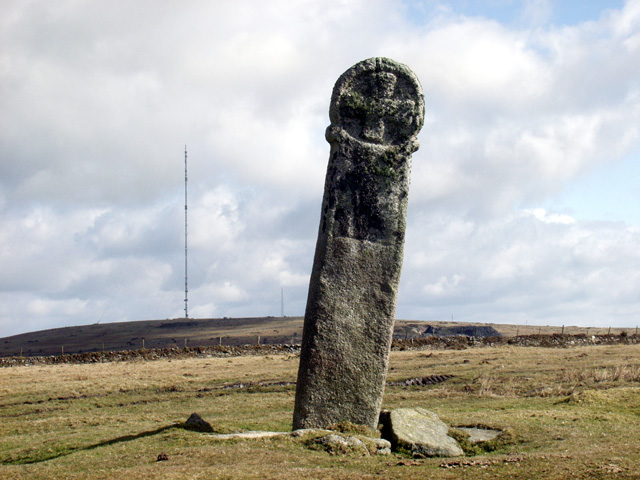
Long Tom, St Cleer Common

Trethevy Quoit is a megalithic chamber tomb, and the Doniert Stone an inscribed stone of the Brittonic Anglo-Saxon period. Near the churchyard is St Cleer's holy well with a small building covering it, built of granite in the 15th century, to allow for a bowssening pool for total immersion.

Arthur Langdon (1896) recorded five Cornish crosses in the parish; one called Long Tom is at St Cleer Common, another is at St Cleer's Well and a cross at Trevorgy is missing. There are also two stones at Redgate of which one is the Doniert Stone and the other is known at the Other Half Stone.

Another cross was discovered at East Fursnewth Farm in 1930 and afterwards removed and erected at Pendean House, Liskeard.

== Cornish wrestling ==
Cornish wrestling tournaments, for prizes, were held in St Cleer in the 1800s.
