= The Voice – La plus belle voix season 15 =

Season of television series

The Voice – La plus belle voix
- Season 15
- Promotional poster featuring coaches Pagny, Bent, Fabian, and Tayc
- Hosted by: Nikos Aliagas; Anaïs Grangerac
- Coaches: Florent Pagny; Amel Bent; Lara Fabian; Tayc
- Winner: Lady O
- Winning coach: Florent Pagny
- Runner-up: CJM's

Release
- Original network: TF1
- Original release: 28 February – 30 May 2026

The fifteenth season of The Voice – La plus belle voix premiered on 28 February 2026, on TF1. In November 2025, it was announced that Florent Pagny would return from last season. He was joined by Lara Fabian, who last coached in season 9 and Amel Bent returning after a 2-season hiatus, while Tayc would debut as a coach. Nikos Aliagas returned for his fifteenth season as host, with Anaïs Grangerac returning for her second season as host.

Lady O from Team Florent won the season on 30 May 2026, marking Florent Pagny's seventh win on the main version (including his one win on The Voice All-Stars).

== Panelists ==
=== Coaches ===
The Voice – La plus belle voix season 15 coaches

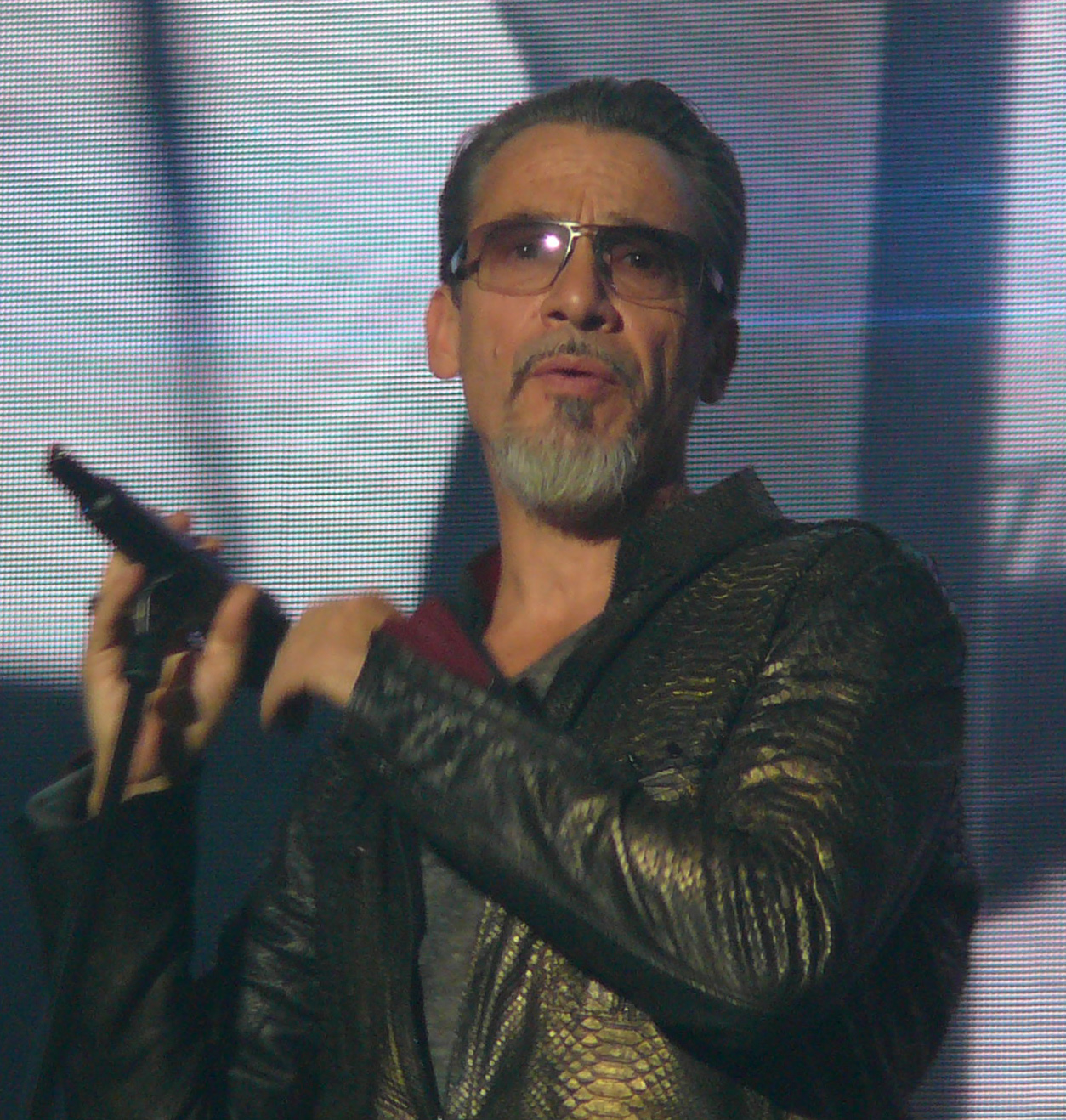
Florent Pagny

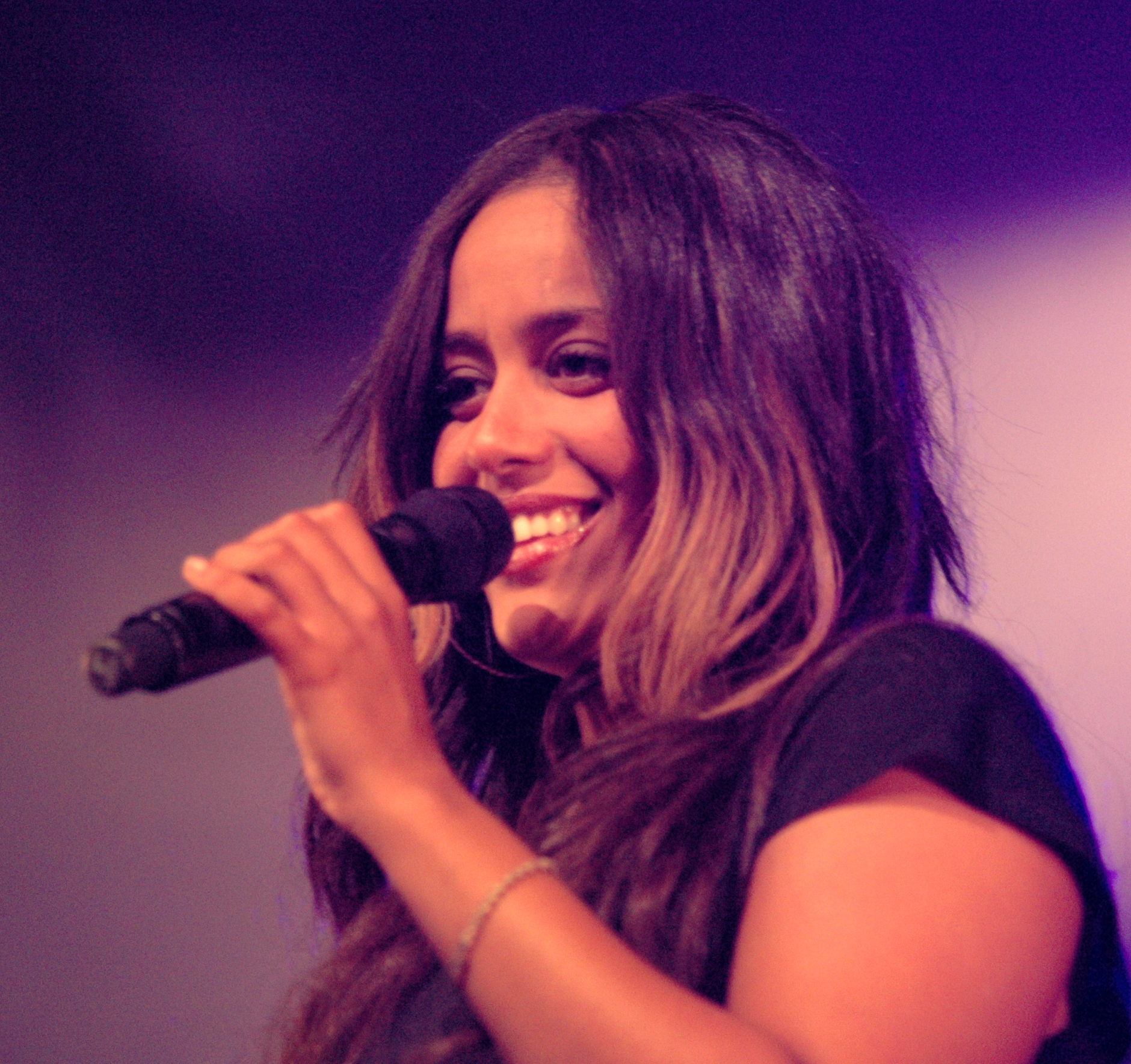
Amel Bent

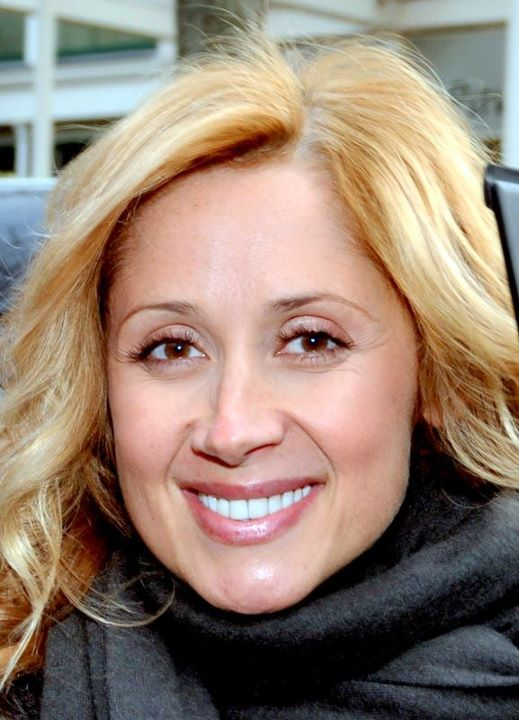
Lara Fabian

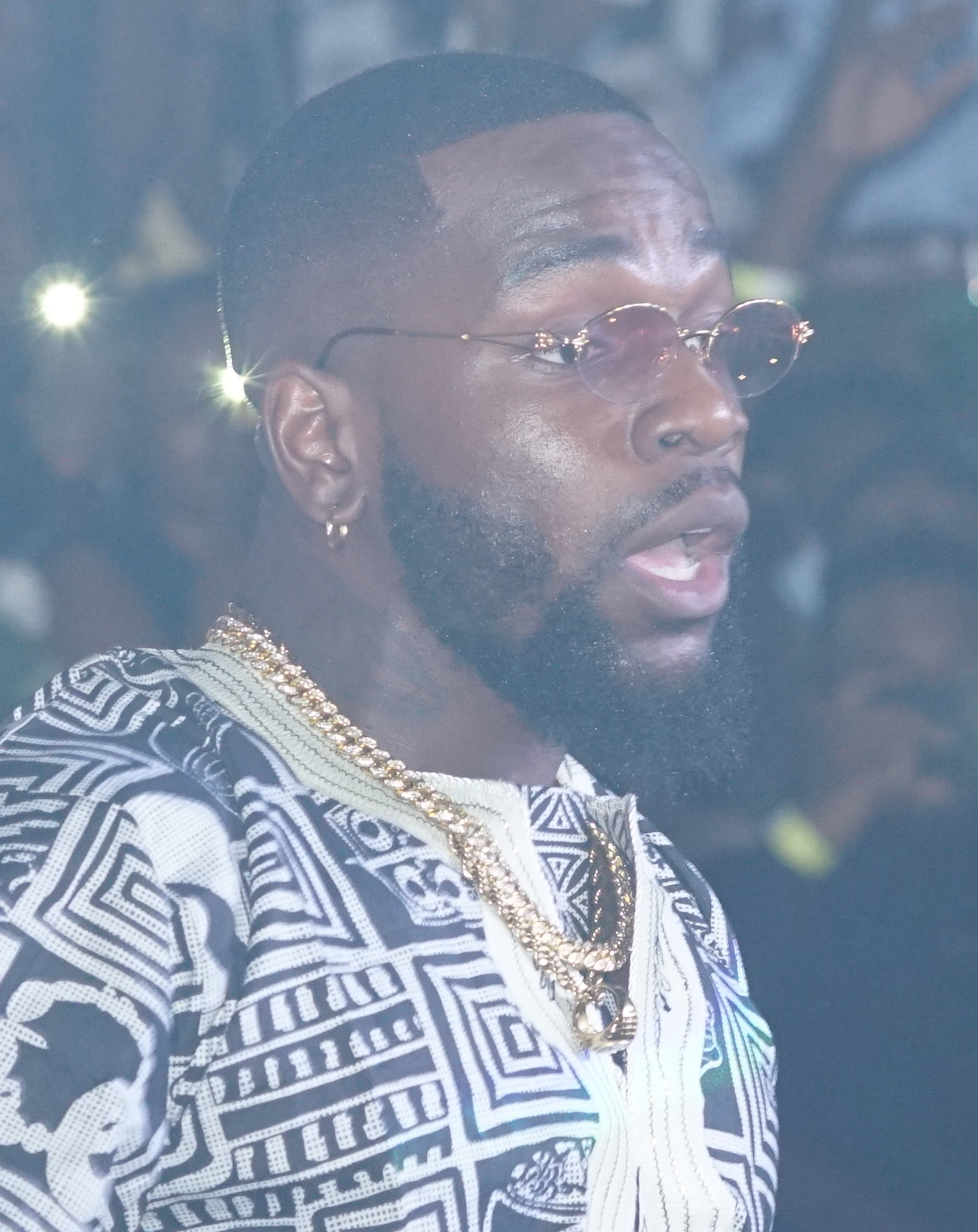
Tayc

On July 6, 2025, it was announced that Vianney would not return for the fifteenth season. Later, on November 4, 2025, both Zaz and Patricia Kaas confirmed their departures from the show, after only one season. Meanwhile, Florent Pagny returned for his eleventh season as coach. He was joined by former coaches Amel Bent, and Lara Fabian, returning for their fifth and second seasons, while French singer-songwriter Tayc joined the panel as a new coach.

=== Hosts ===
Both Nikos Aliagas and Anaïs Grangerac returned as hosts from last season for their fifteenth and second seasons respectively.

== Teams ==
- Winner
- Runner-up
- Third Place
- Fourth Place
- Artist was Eliminated in the Semi-Finals
- Artist was Eliminated in the Performances
- Artist was Eliminated in the Battles
- Artist was Eliminated in Groups
- Artist withdrew

Coaches	Top 69 Artists				
Florent Pagny					
Florent Pagny	Lady O	Sam	Matt Van T	Mélanie Noé	Chloé
Florent Pagny	Dylan Lapassade	M'Rauz	Sarah Manesse	Blue Jay	Jaya
Florent Pagny	Mathilde	Nevedya	Opale	Vitha Sai	Yanis Si Ah
Florent Pagny	Youenn				
Amel Bent					
Amel Bent	CJM's	Gros Monsieur	Virginia Sirolli	Alice	Alvin Amaïzo
Amel Bent	Candyce	He'Evai	Marion	Angelo	Anna
Amel Bent	Coline	Léo Vita	Lidiop	Lisa	Liz
Amel Bent	Ezzahr	Samuela			
Lara Fabian					
Lara Fabian	Hugo Derose	Lohi	Daniele	Joanna	Claes
Lara Fabian	Maëlle	Tessa	Vladimir	Carla-Marie	Charles Traxer
Lara Fabian	CJ Beth	Jérémy Charron	Loukas	Luka	Mikaël
Lara Fabian	Robin	Tristan	Waz		
Tayc					
Tayc	Tessa B.	Mickaelle Leslie	Amadè	Guilherme	Camil
Tayc	Juliette Laurent	Mounir	Roddy Julienne	Coline Sicre	Constance
Tayc	Jo Keita	Laurent	Maysha	Mike Drop	Natacha
Tayc	Prade	Sol	Tom Amosé		

== Blind Auditions ==
The Blind Auditions premiered on 28 February 2026, being aired on a weekly basis. The "super-block" buttons returned this season, where a coach can prevent another coach from pitching to the artist. Each coach has 2 blocks. The "Second Chance" button also returned, allowing a coach to invite an artist to perform again later in the round.

This season, each coach was given a “Secret Weapon” to use during the Blind Auditions. Florent received the "Boomerang", which allowed him to unblock himself and instead block the coach who had originally blocked him. Amel was given the "Mute" button, enabling her to temporarily mute another coach. Lara received the "Gift", which allowed her to offer a gift to an artist in an effort to convince them to join her team. Tayc was given the "Replay", allowing him to press his button for an artist who had originally received no chair turns.

At the end of the round, Florent had sixteen artists, Amel had seventeen, and Lara and Tayc had eighteen.

Blind auditions color keys
✔	Coach pressed "I WANT YOU" button
	Artist defaulted to this coach's team
	Artist elected to join this coach's team
	Artist was eliminated with no coach pressing their button
	Coach gave the artist a "Second Chance"
	Coach used their "Secret Weapon" on this artist
✘	Coach pressed "I WANT YOU" button, but was super-blocked by another coach from getting the artist
	Super-Blocked by Florent; Super-Blocked by Amel; Super-Blocked by Lara; Super-Blocked by Tayc

Episode	Order	Artist	Age	Song	Coach's and artist's choices			
Episode	Order	Artist	Age	Song	Florent	Amel	Lara	Tayc
Episode 1 (28 February)	1	Gros Monsieur	34	"Riez"	✔	✔	✔	✔
Episode 1 (28 February)	2	Lady O	18	"Video Games"	✔	✔	✘	—
Episode 1 (28 February)	3	Ibtissem	19	"Il avait les mots"	—	—	—	—
Episode 1 (28 February)	4	Guilherme	22	"Pas de boogie woogie"	✔	✔	✔	✔^{1}
Episode 1 (28 February)	5	Tessa B.	32	"Confidence pour confidence"	✔	✔	✔	✔
Episode 1 (28 February)	6	Waz	37	"Les Ballons rouges"	✔	—	✔	—
Episode 1 (28 February)	7	Chloé	17	"Super Trouper"	✔	✔	✔	✔
Episode 1 (28 February)	8	Raphaël	16	"Si j'avais su"	—	—	—	—
Episode 1 (28 February)	9	Tessa	26	"Hurt"	—	✔	✔	—
Episode 1 (28 February)	10	Upside	19	"Le café"	—	—	—	—
Episode 1 (28 February)	11	Tristan	29	"Millésime"	—	—	✔	—
Episode 2 (7 March)	1	Mickaelle Leslie	32	"I Wanna Dance with Somebody (Who Loves Me)"	—	✘	—	✔
Episode 2 (7 March)	2	Skye	33	Je serai là	—	—	—	—
Episode 2 (7 March)	3	Hugo Derose	25	"Solo"	✔	✔	✔	✔
Episode 2 (7 March)	4	M'Rauz	27	"Cry Baby"	✔	✔	✔	✔
Episode 2 (7 March)	5	CJM's	35	"Le Poinçonneur des Lilas"	✔	✔	—	✘
Episode 2 (7 March)	6	Sam	38	"I Will Survive"	✔	—	—	—
Episode 2 (7 March)	7	Carla-Marie^{2}	25	"Carmen"	✔	✔	✔	✔
Episode 2 (7 March)	8	Gabriel	25	"Les Étoiles"	—	—	—	—
Episode 2 (7 March)	9	Matt Van T	37	"Born This Way"	✔	—	✔	✔
Episode 2 (7 March)	10	Marcela	50	"Pala Tute"	—	—	—	—
Episode 2 (7 March)	11	Marion	23	"Wonderful Life"	✔	✔	—	—
Episode 2 (7 March)	12	Tom	23	"Ma direction"	—	—	—	—
Episode 2 (7 March)	13	Sol	28	"Mon Vieux"	✔	—	—	✔
Episode 3 (14 March)	1	Juliette Laurent	25	"Somebody That I Used to Know"	✔	✔	✔	✔
Episode 3 (14 March)	2	Gabriel	25	"Qui a le droit..."	—	—	—	—
Episode 3 (14 March)	3	Coline Sicre	27	"Il m'a montré à yodler"	—	—	—	✔
Episode 3 (14 March)	4	Lidiop	38	"Nice to Meet You"	✔	✔	✔	✔
Episode 3 (14 March)	5	He'Evai	21	"What a Wonderful World"	—	✔	—	✘
Episode 3 (14 March)	6	Titiano	29	"Désormais"	—	—	—	—
Episode 3 (14 March)	7	Alexandre	29	"Les chevaliers cathares"	—	—	—	—
Episode 3 (14 March)	8	CJ Beth	28	"When the Party's Over"	✔	✔	✔	—
Episode 3 (14 March)	9	Mathilde	30	"Mise au point"	—	—	—	—
Episode 3 (14 March)	10	Opale	20	"On m'invite pas"	✔	—	—	—
Episode 3 (14 March)	11	Loukas	37	"Si Antes Te Hubiera Conocido"	—	—	✔	—
Episode 3 (14 March)	12	Cissy	30	"Trøllabundin"	—	—	—	—
Episode 3 (14 March)	13	Léo Vita	25	"Animaux fragiles"	—	✔	—	✔
Episode 4 (21 March)	1	Virginia Sirolli	25	"Wasted Love"	✔	✔	✘	✔
Episode 4 (21 March)	2	Jérémy Simon	28	"Rétine"	—	—	—	—
Episode 4 (21 March)	3	Lohi	19	"Je déteste ma vie"	✔	✔	✔	—
Episode 4 (21 March)	4	Samuela	19	"What Was I Made For?"	✔	✔	✔	✔
Episode 4 (21 March)	5	Justin	29	"Blinding Lights"	—	—	—	—
Episode 4 (21 March)	6	Dylan Lapassade	29	"Caravane"	✔	✔	✔	—
Episode 4 (21 March)	7	Claes	35	"Ces gens-là"	✔	✔	✔	✔
Episode 4 (21 March)	8	D'Girls	—N/a	"S&M"	—	—	—	—
Episode 4 (21 March)	9	Blue Jay	27	"Anxiety"	✔	—	—	—
Episode 4 (21 March)	10	Damien Kaym	25	"Fame"	—	—	—	—
Episode 4 (21 March)	11	Camil	22	"Lola"	—	—	—	✔
Episode 4 (21 March)	12	Runji	25	"The Sound of Silence"	—	—	—	—
Episode 4 (21 March)	13	Constance	16	"Restes d'averses"	✔	✔	—	✔
Episode 5 (28 March)	1	Candyce	17	"Beautiful Things"	✔	✔	✔	✔
Episode 5 (28 March)	2	Youenn	19	"Les oubliés"	✔	✔	—	—
Episode 5 (28 March)	3	Pilani Bubu	41	"The Click Song"	—	—	—	—
Episode 5 (28 March)	4	Joanna	37	"Sur un prélude de Bach"	✔	✔	✔^{3}	✔
Episode 5 (28 March)	5	Mounir	26	"Love in the Dark"	—	✔	✔	✔
Episode 5 (28 March)	6	Robin Ditsch	24	"De bisoux"	—	—	—	—
Episode 5 (28 March)	7	Les Cocodettes	26 & 25	"Ergen Deda" / "Bre Petrunko"	—	—	—	—
Episode 5 (28 March)	8	Alvin Amaïzo	29	"Ciel"	✔	✔	—	—
Episode 5 (28 March)	9	Coline	17	"Ne me dis plus jamais"	—	✔	—	✔
Episode 5 (28 March)	10	Arthur	26	"Adieu mon amour"	—	—	—	—
Episode 5 (28 March)	11	Sarah Manesse	37	"Breathe Me"	✔	—	—	—
Episode 5 (28 March)	12	César	19	"Yes Sir, I Can Boogie"	—	—	—	—
Episode 5 (28 March)	13	Charles Traxer	26	"J'veux d'la tendresse"	—	—	✔	—
Episode 6 (4 April)^{4}	1	Roddy Julienne	75	"Proud Mary"	✔	✔	✔	✔
Episode 6 (4 April)^{4}	2	Ilan	20	"Ce monde"	—	—	—	—
Episode 6 (4 April)^{4}	3	Mélanie Noé	33	"Good Luck, Babe!"	✔	—	✔	—
Episode 6 (4 April)^{4}	4	Maiia	25	"Toute seule"	—	—	—	—
Episode 6 (4 April)^{4}	5	Amadè	22	"Voulez-vous danser grand-mère ?"	✔	—	—	✔
Episode 6 (4 April)^{4}	6	Ô Débit	33	Improvisational Rap	—	—	—	—
Episode 6 (4 April)^{4}	7	Daniele	33	"Speak Softly Love"	✔	✔	✔	✔
Episode 6 (4 April)^{4}	8	Natacha	31	"J'sais pas plaire"	—	—	—	—
Episode 6 (4 April)^{4}	9	Anna	22	"J'ai le blues de toi"	✔	✔	—	✔
Episode 6 (4 April)^{4}	10	Robin Ditsch	24	"Le Chanteur"	—	—	—	—
Episode 6 (4 April)^{4}	11	Nadège	24	"You Oughta Know"	—	—	—	—
Episode 6 (4 April)^{4}	12	Yanis Si Ah	30	"Enemy"	✔	—	—	—
Episode 6 (4 April)^{4}	13	Théa Rose	24	"Ève lève-toi"	—	—	—	—
Episode 7 (11 April)^{5}	1	Ezzahr	33	"Come Together"	—	✔	—	—
Episode 7 (11 April)^{5}	2	Sarah Castello	18	"Destinée"	—	—	—	—
Episode 7 (11 April)^{5}	3	Vladimir	38	"Je suis malade"	✔	✔	✔	✔
Episode 7 (11 April)^{5}	4	Jo Keita	44	"No Woman, No Cry"	✔	✔	✔	✔
Episode 7 (11 April)^{5}	5	Diana Selever	27	"Dragostea din tei"	—	—	—	—
Episode 7 (11 April)^{5}	6	Natacha	31	"The Loneliest"	✔	—	—	✔
Episode 7 (11 April)^{5}	7	Maëlle	20	"Comment est ta peine ?"	✔	✔	✔	✔
Episode 7 (11 April)^{5}	8	Louis	26	"Next Summer"	—	—	—	—
Episode 7 (11 April)^{5}	9	Nevedya	—N/a	"Pourquoi tu restes"	✔	—	—	—
Episode 7 (11 April)^{5}	10	Simon Louveau	34	"Les Sunlights des tropiques"	—	—	—	—
Episode 7 (11 April)^{5}	11	Prade	29	"La pluie"	—	—	—	✔
Episode 7 (11 April)^{5}	12	L'oiseau joli	51	"Il jouait du piano debout"	—	—	—	—
Episode 7 (11 April)^{5}	13	Tom Amosé	23	"Should I Stay or Should I Go"	—	—	—	✔
Episode 8 (18 April)^{6}	1	Alice	21	"Ils me rient tous au nez"	—	✔	—	—
Episode 8 (18 April)^{6}	2	Bernardo	33	"Air du toréador"	—	—	—	—
Episode 8 (18 April)^{6}	3	Laurent	32	"Purple Rain"	✔	✔	✔	✔
Episode 8 (18 April)^{6}	4	Lisa	18	"Quelques mots d'amour"	—	✔	—	—
Episode 8 (18 April)^{6}	5	Mikaël	43	"The Final Countdown"	✔	—	✔	—
Episode 8 (18 April)^{6}	6	Arkange	25	"Vivre ou survivre"	—	—	—	—
Episode 8 (18 April)^{6}	7	Kamélia	41	"Chanter pour ceux qui sont loin de chez eux"	—	—	—	—
Episode 8 (18 April)^{6}	8	Robin	19	"Vedette"	✔	✔	✔	—
Episode 8 (18 April)^{6}	9	Zonco.Ra	34	"Lose Control"	—	—	—	—
Episode 8 (18 April)^{6}	10	Tara	46	"Roc"	—	—	—	—
Episode 8 (18 April)^{6}	11	Luka	30	"Petite musique"	✔	—	✔	✔
Episode 8 (18 April)^{6}	12	Lara	19	"Le mal aimé"	—	—	—	—
Episode 8 (18 April)^{6}	13	Jaya	23	"Heart of Glass"	✔	—	—	—
Episode 9 (25 April)^{7}	1	Mathilde	26	"Le bleu lumière"	✔	✔	✔	✔
Episode 9 (25 April)^{7}	2	Les Autres	—N/a	"Les P'tits Papiers"	—	—	—	—
Episode 9 (25 April)^{7}	3	Angelo	24	"Can't Help Falling in Love"	✔	✔	✔	—
Episode 9 (25 April)^{7}	4	Maysha	31	"Nuit magique"	—	—	—	✔
Episode 9 (25 April)^{7}	5	Jérémy Charron	34	"Ne me jugez pas"	✔	✔	✔	—
Episode 9 (25 April)^{7}	6	Jessica	33	"Cuff It"	—	—	—	—
Episode 9 (25 April)^{7}	7	Vitha Sai	36	"The Best"	✔	—	—	—
Episode 9 (25 April)^{7}	8	Serena Skinner	—N/a	"Rasputin"	—	—	—	—
Episode 9 (25 April)^{7}	9	Mike Drop	26	"I Am What I Am"	—	—	—	✔
Episode 9 (25 April)^{7}	10	Zonco.Ra	34	"Si, maman si"	—	—	—	—
Episode 9 (25 April)^{7}	11	Egea	40	"Soleil bleu"	—	—	—	—
Episode 9 (25 April)^{7}	12	Liz	24	"Ordinary"	✔	✔	—	—

- ^1: Lara originally blocked Tayc but, with producer approval, took back the block afterwards.
- ^2: Carla-Marie auditioned in the 11th season, where she didn't manage to receive a chair turn.
- ^3: Florent originally blocked Lara but, with producer approval, took back the block afterwards.
- ^4: Amel appeared as a duo coach with former coach Matt Pokora in this episode.
- ^5: Tayc appeared as a duo coach with former The Voice Kids coach Kendji Girac in this episode.
- ^6: Lara appeared as a duo coach with former coach Louis Bertignac in this episode.
- ^7: Florent appeared as a duo coach with former coach Zazie in this episode.

== Qualifications / Battles ==
The qualifications and battles aired on 2 and 9 May 2026. In this round, there are two phases. The first, the qualifications, involves each coach forming their artists into groups of various sizes to sing either one collective song or multiple songs. At the end of the performance, each coach only takes two from the group to the battles. In the second phase, the battles, the two artists that one the qualifications performance are paired to sing one song with their coach only taking one through to the next round.

Qualifications/Battles colour key
Artist won the Qualification/Battle and advanced to the Performances
Artist lost the Qualification/Battle and was eliminated

=== Qualifications ===
Qualifications results
Episode	Order	Coach	Artists	Song	Result
Episode 10 (2 May)	1	Lara Fabian	Claes	"Formidable"	Qualified
Episode 10 (2 May)	1	Lara Fabian	Jérémy Charron	"Formidable"	Eliminated
Episode 10 (2 May)	1	Lara Fabian	Robin	"L'Enfer"	Eliminated
Episode 10 (2 May)	1	Lara Fabian	Hugo Derose	"L'Enfer"	Qualified
Episode 10 (2 May)	1	Lara Fabian	Luka	"Papaoutai"	Eliminated
Episode 10 (2 May)	2	Florent Pagny	Blue Jay	"Mourir sur scène"	Eliminated
Episode 10 (2 May)	2	Florent Pagny	Chloé	"Mourir sur scène"	Qualified
Episode 10 (2 May)	2	Florent Pagny	Lady O	"Mourir sur scène"	Qualified
Episode 10 (2 May)	2	Florent Pagny	Opale	"Mourir sur scène"	Eliminated
Episode 10 (2 May)	3	Tayc	Camil	"I Want You Back"	Qualified
Episode 10 (2 May)	3	Tayc	Guilherme	"I Want You Back"	Qualified
Episode 10 (2 May)	3	Tayc	Mike Drop	"I Want You Back"	Eliminated
Episode 10 (2 May)	3	Tayc	Tom Amosé	"I Want You Back"	Eliminated
Episode 10 (2 May)	4	Amel Bent	Angelo	"Vole"	Eliminated
Episode 10 (2 May)	4	Amel Bent	Samuela	"Vole"	Eliminated
Episode 10 (2 May)	4	Amel Bent	Alice	"Habibi"	Qualified
Episode 10 (2 May)	4	Amel Bent	He'Evai	"Habibi"	Qualified
Episode 10 (2 May)	5	Tayc	Tessa B.	"Tu m'oublieras"	Qualified
Episode 10 (2 May)	5	Tayc	Constance	"Adieu mon amour"	Eliminated
Episode 10 (2 May)	5	Tayc	Mounir	"Jealous"	Qualified
Episode 10 (2 May)	5	Tayc	Sol	"Hymne à l'amour"	Eliminated
Episode 10 (2 May)	5	Tayc	Coline Sicre	"Vienne"	Eliminated
Episode 10 (2 May)	6	Florent Pagny	Youenn	"Hallelujah"	Eliminated
Episode 10 (2 May)	6	Florent Pagny	Sam	"Mon amie la rose"	Qualified
Episode 10 (2 May)	6	Florent Pagny	Dylan Lapassade	"Des milliers de je t'aime"	Qualified
Episode 10 (2 May)	6	Florent Pagny	Yanis Si Ah	"The Night We Met"	Eliminated
Episode 10 (2 May)	7	Lara Fabian	Vladimir	"Paparazzi"	Qualified
Episode 10 (2 May)	7	Lara Fabian	Mikaël	"Locked Out of Heaven"	Eliminated
Episode 10 (2 May)	7	Lara Fabian	Loukas	"La Isla Bonita"	Eliminated
Episode 10 (2 May)	7	Lara Fabian	Daniele	"Believe"	Qualified
Episode 10 (2 May)	8	Amel Bent	Candyce	"Si je m'en sors"	Qualified
Episode 10 (2 May)	8	Amel Bent	Ezzahr	"Alter Ego"	Eliminated
Episode 10 (2 May)	8	Amel Bent	Liz	"The Power of Love"	Eliminated
Episode 10 (2 May)	8	Amel Bent	Virginia Sirolli	"I Love You"	Qualified
Episode 11 (9 May)	1	Florent Pagny	Mathilde	"Skyfall"	Eliminated
Episode 11 (9 May)	1	Florent Pagny	Mélanie Noé	"All I Ask"	Qualified
Episode 11 (9 May)	1	Florent Pagny	Nevedya	"Someone like You"	Eliminated
Episode 11 (9 May)	1	Florent Pagny	Sarah Manesse	"Hello"	Qualified
Episode 11 (9 May)	2	Tayc	Natacha	"Bad Guy"	Eliminated
Episode 11 (9 May)	2	Tayc	Prade	"Feeling Good"	Eliminated
Episode 11 (9 May)	2	Tayc	Amadè	"Les oiseaux rares"	Qualified
Episode 11 (9 May)	2	Tayc	Jo Keita	"Natural Blues"	Eliminated
Episode 11 (9 May)	2	Tayc	Juliette Laurent	"Creep"	Qualified
Episode 11 (9 May)	3	Lara Fabian	Tessa	"Quand on n'a que l'amour"	Qualified
Episode 11 (9 May)	3	Lara Fabian	Carla-Marie	"Quand on n'a que l'amour"	Eliminated
Episode 11 (9 May)	3	Lara Fabian	Joanna	"Quand on n'a que l'amour"	Qualified
Episode 11 (9 May)	3	Lara Fabian	CJ Beth	"Quand on n'a que l'amour"	Eliminated
Episode 11 (9 May)	4	Amel Bent	Anna	"Une vie d'amour"	Eliminated
Episode 11 (9 May)	4	Amel Bent	Marion	"Hier encore"	Qualified
Episode 11 (9 May)	4	Amel Bent	Lisa	"Comme ils disent"	Eliminated
Episode 11 (9 May)	4	Amel Bent	Coline	"La Bohème"	Eliminated
Episode 11 (9 May)	4	Amel Bent	CJM'S	"La Bohème"	Qualified
Episode 11 (9 May)	5	Florent Pagny	M'Rauz	"Nothing Breaks Like a Heart"	Qualified
Episode 11 (9 May)	5	Florent Pagny	Jaya	"Nothing Breaks Like a Heart"	Eliminated
Episode 11 (9 May)	5	Florent Pagny	Vitha Sai	"Nothing Breaks Like a Heart"	Eliminated
Episode 11 (9 May)	5	Florent Pagny	Matt Van T	"Nothing Breaks Like a Heart"	Qualified
Episode 11 (9 May)	6	Amel Bent	Alvin Amaïzo	"Monde"	Qualified
Episode 11 (9 May)	6	Amel Bent	Lidiop	"Monde"	Eliminated
Episode 11 (9 May)	6	Amel Bent	Léo Vita	"Monde"	Eliminated
Episode 11 (9 May)	6	Amel Bent	Gros Monsieur	"Monde"	Qualified
Episode 11 (9 May)	7	Tayc	Roddy Julienne	"A Change Is Gonna Come"	Qualified
Episode 11 (9 May)	7	Tayc	Laurent	"A Change Is Gonna Come"	Eliminated
Episode 11 (9 May)	7	Tayc	Mickaëlle Leslie	"Girl Like Me"	Qualified
Episode 11 (9 May)	7	Tayc	Maysha	"Girl Like Me"	Eliminated
Episode 11 (9 May)	8	Lara Fabian	Maëlle	"Sang pour sang"	Qualified
Episode 11 (9 May)	8	Lara Fabian	Tristan	"Quand revient la nuit"	Eliminated
Episode 11 (9 May)	8	Lara Fabian	Charles Traxer	"Quelque chose de Tennessee"	Eliminated
Episode 11 (9 May)	8	Lara Fabian	Waz	"Requiem pour un fou"	Eliminated
Episode 11 (9 May)	8	Lara Fabian	Lohi	"Je te promets"	Qualified

=== Battles ===
Battles results
Episode	Order	Coach	Winner(s)	Song	Loser(s)
Episode 10 (2 May)	1	Lara Fabian	Hugo Derose	"Changer"	Claes
Episode 10 (2 May)	2	Florent Pagny	Lady O	"Ordinaire"	Chloé
Episode 10 (2 May)	3	Tayc	Guilherme	"La Musique que j'aime"	Camil
Episode 10 (2 May)	4	Amel Bent	Alice	"Habibi"	He'Evai
Episode 10 (2 May)	5	Tayc	Tessa B.	"Say Something"	Mounir
Episode 10 (2 May)	6	Florent Pagny	Sam	"La Foule"	Dylan Lapassade
Episode 10 (2 May)	7	Lara Fabian	Daniele	"We Are the Champions"	Vladimir
Episode 10 (2 May)	8	Amel Bent	Virginia Sirolli	"Golden"	Candyce
Episode 11 (9 May)	1	Florent Pagny	Mélanie Noé	"Die with a Smile"	Sarah Manesse
Episode 11 (9 May)	2	Tayc	Amadè	"Bachelorette"	Juliette Laurent
Episode 11 (9 May)	3	Lara Fabian	Joanna	"Anyone"	Tessa
Episode 11 (9 May)	4	Amel Bent	CJM'S	"Je voulais te dire que je t'attends"	Marion
Episode 11 (9 May)	5	Florent Pagny	Matt Van T	"Jolene"	M'Rauz
Episode 11 (9 May)	6	Amel Bent	Gros Monsieur	"Mr/Mme"	Alvin Amaïzo
Episode 11 (9 May)	7	Tayc	Mickaëlle Leslie	"Happy"	Roddy Julienne
Episode 11 (9 May)	8	Lara Fabian	Lohi	"Ma meilleure ennemie"	Maëlle

== Performances ==
The performances aired on 16 May 2026. For the first time in the history of The Voice, the talents perform by showing their musical talent through a song and a staging of their choice, with decor, extras, choristers. The goal is to achieve real stage performances. For their part, Florent, Amel, Lara, and Tayc accompany and push to the end of their vision their last four talents still in the running. They put them face to face two by two, to keep only one talent per pair.

Alice from Team Amel withdrew from the show prior to the round; therefore, only the remaining three artists on Team Amel performed for two semi-final spots.

At the end of this round, only two talents per coach are qualified for the semi-final.

Performances colour key
Artist was chosen by his/her coach to advance to the semi-final
Artist was not chosen by his/her coach and was eliminated

Performances results
Order	Coach	Artists	Songs	Result
1	Florent Pagny	Sam	"Vie d'artiste"	Advanced
1	Florent Pagny	Matt Van T	"Gabrielle"	Eliminated
2	Amel Bent	Virginia Sirolli	"Berghain"	Eliminated
2	Amel Bent	CJM'S	"Harlem"	Advanced
2	Amel Bent	Gros Monsieur	"Corps"	Advanced
3	Lara Fabian	Hugo Derose	"El Tango de Roxanne"	Advanced
3	Lara Fabian	Daniele	"Take on Me"	Eliminated
4	Tayc	Tessa B.	"Melodrama"	Advanced
4	Tayc	Amadè	"Halo"	Eliminated
5	Lara Fabian	Joanna	"J'y crois encore"	Eliminated
5	Lara Fabian	Lohi	"Peurs"	Advanced
6	Florent Pagny	Mélanie Noé	"All by Myself"	Eliminated
6	Florent Pagny	Lady O	"Have a Baby (With Me)"	Advanced
7	Tayc	Mickaëlle Leslie	"Stand Up"	Advanced
7	Tayc	Guilherme	"You're the One That I Want"	Eliminated

== Semi-final ==
The semi-final aired on 23 May 2026. The eight semi-finalists share the stage with former coaches or former contestants for duets. Additionally, the artists perform solo during the episode, with only one per team advancing to the final.

Semi-final colour key
Artist advanced to the final
Artist was eliminated

Semi-final results
Coach	Contestant	Order	Solo song	Order	Duet song	Result
Tayc	Tessa B.	1	"Bésame Mucho"	9	"Donne-moi le temps" (with Jenifer)	Advanced
Amel Bent	Gros Monsieur	16	"Tout va bien"	2	"Clown" (with Soprano)	Eliminated
Lara Fabian	Hugo Derose	3	"Monde"	12	"Dis-moi que tu m'aimes" (with Slimane)	Advanced
Florent Pagny	Lady O	14	"Vole"	4	"Fais-moi une place" (with Julien Clerc)	Advanced
Tayc	Mickaëlle Leslie	5	"Where Is My Husband!"	10	"J'avoue" (with Linh)	Eliminated
Lara Fabian	Lohi	11	"Jef"	6	"L'effet de masse" (with Maëlle)	Eliminated
Amel Bent	CJM's	15	"Seul au monde"	7	"Un homme" (with Jérémy Frérot)	Advanced
Florent Pagny	Sam	8	"Voilà"	13	"À ma place" (with Zazie)	Eliminated

== Final ==
The final aired on 30 May 2026. The four finalists performed for public votes through solo performances and duets with guests

At the end of these performances, the two artists with the most votes from the public reach the super-final, where they perform twice, mixing covers and original compositions.

At the end of the show, Lady O was announced the winner of the season, marking Florent Pagny's seventh win as a coach on the main version of the show.

=== Phase One ===
The Top 4 and the coaches performed "Rolling in the Deep" at the beginning of the show.

Phase One colour key
Artist advanced to phase two
Artist was eliminated

Final (phase one) results
Coach	Contestant	Order	Solo song	Order	Duet song	Result
Florent Pagny	Lady O	1	"Un peu plus loin"	8	"Jacques a dit" (with Christophe Willem)	Advanced
Amel Bent	CJM's	2	"Les Démons de minuit"	5	"Je t'accuse" (with Suzane)	Advanced
Tayc	Tessa B.	3	"S'il suffisait d'aimer"	6	"Adieu mon amour" (with Helena)	Eliminated
Lara Fabian	Hugo Derose	4	"Fix You"	7	"J'ai laissé" (with Christophe Maé)	Eliminated

=== Phase Two ===
During phase two, Florent Pagny's previous winners Slimane, Marghe, Nour, II Cello, and The Voice All-Stars winner Anne Sila performed to commemorate Pagny's final season as a coach.

Phase Two colour key
Winner
Runner-up

Final (phase two) results
Coach	Contestant	Order	Song	Result
Florent Pagny	Lady O	1	"The Greatest"	Winner
Florent Pagny	Lady O	3	"Little Me" (original song)	Winner
Amel Bent	CJM's	2	"Hymne à l'amour"	Runner-up
Amel Bent	CJM's	4	"T'es doué" (original song)	Runner-up
