= List of number-one singles of 1986 (France) =

This is a list of the French SNEP Top 50 Singles number-ones of 1986.

== Summary ==
=== Singles Chart ===
Week	Issue Date	Artist	Single
1	5 January	Jean-Jacques Goldman and Michael Jones	"Je te donne"
2	12 January	Jean-Jacques Goldman and Michael Jones	"Je te donne"
3	19 January	Jean-Jacques Goldman and Michael Jones	"Je te donne"
4	26 January	Jean-Luc Lahaye	"Papa chanteur"
5	2 February	Daniel Balavoine	"L'Aziza"
6	9 February	Daniel Balavoine	"L'Aziza"
7	16 February	Daniel Balavoine	"L'Aziza"
8	23 February	Daniel Balavoine	"L'Aziza"
9	2 March	Daniel Balavoine	"L'Aziza"
10	9 March	Daniel Balavoine	"L'Aziza"
11	16 March	Daniel Balavoine	"L'Aziza"
12	23 March	Daniel Balavoine	"L'Aziza"
13	30 March	Gold	"Capitaine abandonné"
14	6 April	Gold	"Capitaine abandonné"
15	13 April	Gold	"Capitaine abandonné"
16	20 April	Gold	"Capitaine abandonné"
17	27 April	Stéphanie	"Ouragan"
18	4 May	Stéphanie	"Ouragan"
19	11 May	Stéphanie	"Ouragan"
20	18 May	Stéphanie	"Ouragan"
21	25 May	Stéphanie	"Ouragan"
22	1 June	Stéphanie	"Ouragan"
23	8 June	Stéphanie	"Ouragan"
24	15 June	Stéphanie	"Ouragan"
25	22 June	Stéphanie	"Ouragan"
26	29 June	Stéphanie	"Ouragan"
27	6 July	Jeanne Mas	"En Rouge et Noir"
28	13 July	Jeanne Mas	"En Rouge et Noir"
29	20 July	Images	"Les Démons de minuit"
30	27 July	Images	"Les Démons de minuit"
31	3 August	Images	"Les Démons de minuit"
32	10 August	Images	"Les Démons de minuit"
33	17 August	Images	"Les Démons de minuit"
34	24 August	Images	"Les Démons de minuit"
35	31 August	Images	"Les Démons de minuit"
36	7 September	Images	"Les Démons de minuit"
37	14 September	Images	"Les Démons de minuit"
38	21 September	Images	"Les Démons de minuit"
39	28 September	Images	"Les Démons de minuit"
40	5 October	Images	"Les Démons de minuit"
41	12 October	Images	"Les Démons de minuit"
42	19 October	MC Miker G & DJ Sven	"Holiday Rap"
43	26 October	MC Miker G & DJ Sven	"Holiday Rap"
44	2 November	Julie Pietri	"Ève lève-toi"
45	9 November	Europe	"The Final Countdown"
46	16 November	Europe	"The Final Countdown"
47	23 November	Europe	"The Final Countdown"
48	30 November	Europe	"The Final Countdown"
49	7 December	Europe	"The Final Countdown"
50	14 December	Europe	"The Final Countdown"
51	21 December	Europe	"The Final Countdown"
52	28 December	Europe	"The Final Countdown"

== See also ==
- 1986 in music
- List of number-one hits (France)
- List of artists who reached number one on the French Singles Chart
