= List of number-one singles of 1993 (France) =

This is a list of the French SNEP Top 100 Singles number-ones of 1993.

== Summary ==
=== Singles Chart ===
Week	Issue Date	Artist	Single
1	January 2	Jordy	"Dur dur d'être bébé!"
2	January 9	Jordy	"Dur dur d'être bébé!"
3	January 16	Jordy	"Dur dur d'être bébé!"
4	January 23	Jordy	"Dur dur d'être bébé!"
5	January 30	Whitney Houston	"I Will Always Love You"
6	February 6	Whitney Houston	"I Will Always Love You"
7	February 13	Whitney Houston	"I Will Always Love You"
8	February 20	Whitney Houston	"I Will Always Love You"
9	February 27	Whitney Houston	"I Will Always Love You"
10	March 6	Whitney Houston	"I Will Always Love You"
11	March 13	Whitney Houston	"I Will Always Love You"
12	March 20	Whitney Houston	"I Will Always Love You"
13	March 27	Jordy	"Alison (C'est ma copine à moi)"
14	April 3	Jordy	"Alison (C'est ma copine à moi)"
15	April 10	Jordy	"Alison (C'est ma copine à moi)"
16	April 17	Jordy	"Alison (C'est ma copine à moi)"
17	April 24	Jordy	"Alison (C'est ma copine à moi)"
18	May 1	2 Unlimited	"No Limit"
19	May 8	2 Unlimited	"No Limit"
20	May 15	2 Unlimited	"No Limit"
21	May 22	2 Unlimited	"No Limit"
22	29 May	Dire Straits	Encores EP
23	June 5	Dire Straits	Encores EP
24	June 12	Dire Straits	Encores EP
25	June 19	Dire Straits	Encores EP
26	June 26	Dire Straits	Encores EP
27	July 3	Dire Straits	Encores EP
28	July 10	Dire Straits	Encores EP
29	July 17	Haddaway	"What Is Love"
30	July 24	Haddaway	"What Is Love"
31	July 31	Haddaway	"What Is Love"
32	August 7	Haddaway	"What Is Love"
33	August 14	Haddaway	"What Is Love"
34	August 21	Les G.O. Cul-ture	"Darla dirladada"
35	August 28	Les G.O. Cul-ture	"Darla dirladada"
36	September 4	Les G.O. Cul-ture	"Darla dirladada"
37	September 11	No information	
38	September 18	Regg'Lyss	"Mets de l'huile"
39	September 25	Les G.O. Cul-ture	"Darla dirladada"
40	October 2	Freddie Mercury	"Living on My Own (1993)"
41	October 9	Freddie Mercury	"Living on My Own (1993)"
42	October 16	Freddie Mercury	"Living on My Own (1993)"
43	October 23	Regg'Lyss	"Mets de l'huile"
44	October 30	Freddie Mercury	"Living on My Own"
45	November 6	Freddie Mercury	"Living on My Own"
46	November 13	Freddie Mercury	"Living on My Own"
47	November 20	Freddie Mercury	"Living on My Own"
48	November 27	Freddie Mercury	"Living on My Own"
49	December 4	Freddie Mercury	"Living on My Own"
50	December 11	Freddie Mercury	"Living on My Own"
51	December 18	Freddie Mercury	"Living on My Own"
52	December 25	Freddie Mercury	"Living on My Own"

== See also ==
- 1993 in music
- List of number-one singles in France
- List of artists who reached number one on the French Singles Chart
