= Les Démons de minuit =

"Les démons de minuit"

Single by Images

from the album Album d'Images
- B-side: "Instrumental"
- Released: June 1986
- Recorded: 1986
- Genre: Pop
- Length: 3:54 (album); 6:05 (extended)
- Label: Flarenasch
- Songwriters: Richard Seff; Stéphane Despres; Jean Louis Pujade; Phillipe Mimouni; Christophe Despres
- Producer: Richard Seff

Images singles chronology
"Les démons de minuit" (1986)	"Corps à corps" (1987)

"Les Démons de minuit" is the debut single of the French band Images. Released in June 1986, it was the first single from their first album Album d'Images. Very popular, the song was a huge hit in France and the main summer hit of 1986, peaking at number one for 13 weeks.

== Background and writing ==
"Les Démons de minuit" was also released as an English version (by the same group), titled "Love Emotion". It was very difficult for the group to find a record company agreeing to sign a contract with them, because at the beginning nobody believed in the potential of the song. Christophe Desprès, who took part in the composition of the song, was also a member of the group Pacifique, which released two top 20 hits in the late 1980s. At the time, the music video apparently was regarded scandalous in France as it featured a little particular priest, tortured by the temptation among seductive women.

== Chart performance ==
In France, "Les Démons de minuit" debuted at number 30 on the SNEP Singles Chart on 21 June 1986, reached the top 10 two weeks after and climbed to number one on July 19, where it stayed for 13 weeks, and fell off the chart after 30 weeks. The song thus hold the title of the song with most weeks at number one on the French Singles Chart, this record being also performed in 1987 by Licence IV's "Viens boire un p'tit coup à la maison", and was beaten in 1993 by Jordy's "Dur dur d'être bébé!" which stayed at number one for 15 weeks. In addition, "Les Démons de minuit" was a number one hit in the Walloon region of Belgium, while it peaked at number 31 in the Flanders region of the same country. On the overall Eurochart Hot 100, it started at number 84 on 5 July 1987, attained number 20 in its 10th week, and fell off the chart after 28 weeks of presence. It also spent 13 weeks on the European Airplay Top 50, with a peak at number 21 twice.

== Cover versions ==
"Les Démons de minuit" was re-recorded by Images in 1996 in a remixed version and features in this new version on their cover album Jusqu'au bout de la nuit, which was number one on the French Albums Chart for four weeks in France and number six in Belgium (Wallonia). In 1999, the song was included in a successful medley entitled "Jusqu'au bout de la nuit", performed with Émile, the singer of French band Gold (number 12 in France, number 24 in Wallonia).

The song was covered by DV8 feat. R. Fame in 2002. It was also covered by Soma Riba and DJ Fou in 2005, and this version achieved a minor success, failing to reach the top 50 (number 54 in France). The playback of the song was also used for a rap version in English-language under the title "Devil's Rap", by "Ramsdy Jay and Gang".

== Track listings ==
- 7" single
1. "Les Démons de minuit" — 3:54
2. "Les Démons de minuit" (instrumental) — 3:58
- 12" maxi
1. "Les Démons de minuit" — 6:05
2. "Les Démons de minuit" (instrumental) — 4:25

== Charts ==
=== Weekly charts ===
1986 weekly chart performance for "Les Démons de minuit"
Chart (1986)	Peak position
Belgium (Ultratop 50 Flanders)	31
Belgium (Ultratop 40 Wallonia)	1
Europe (European Hot 100)	20
Europe (European Airplay Top 50)	21
France (SNEP)	1

1999 weekly chart performance for "Jusqu'au bout de la nuit" (medley)
Chart (1999)	Peak position
Belgium (Ultratop 50 Wallonia)	24
France (SNEP)	12

2005 weekly chart performance for "Les Démons de minuit" (by Soma Riba)
Chart (2005)	Peak position
France (SNEP)	54

=== Year-end charts ===
1986 year-end chart performance for "Les Démons de minuit"
Chart (1986)	Position
Europe (European Hot 100)	47
France (SNEP)	1

1999 year-end chart performance for "Jusqu'au bout de la nuit" (medley)
Chart (1999)	Position
France (SNEP)	75

== Certifications and sales ==
Certifications for "Les Démons de minuit"
Region	Certification	Certified units/sales
France (SNEP)	Platinum	1,000,000^{*}
France (SNEP) 1999 Medley version	Silver	125,000^{*}
^{*} Sales figures based on certification alone.

== See also ==
- List of number-one singles of 1986 (France)
