= Pochette =

Pochette is a French word for "little pocket", it may refer to:

- Pochette (musical instrument), a small bowed lute box
- A type of small handbag

== See also ==
- Pochette Surprise (Surprise Package)
