= Help It Along =

1973 single by Cliff Richard

Single by Cliff Richard
- Released: 27 April 1973
- Recorded: 28 December 1972
- Studio: EMI Studios, London
- Genre: Pop
- Length: 2:52
- Label: EMI
- Songwriter(s): Christopher Neil
- Producer(s): David Mackay

Cliff Richard singles chronology
"Power to All Our Friends" (1973)	"Help It Along" (1973)	"Take Me High" (1973)

"Help It Along" is a song by British singer Cliff Richard, released as a four-track maxi single. It peaked at number 29 on the UK Singles Chart.

== Release ==
"Help It Along", written by Christopher Neil, was the first track of the maxi single titled Eurovision Special. The other three tracks were "Tomorrow Rising", written by Mike Hawker and Brian Bennett, "Days of Love", written by Alan Hawkshaw and Dougie Wright, and "Ashes to Ashes", written by Tony Cole. The four songs were the remaining of the six songs selected as finalists for the UK Eurovision national selection process. The other two, "Power to All Our Friends" and "Come Back Billie Jo" were released as the previous A-side and B-side single and had received the two highest votes. The track listing for the Eurovision Special single followed the next highest votes.

The four songs were released as two singles in Denmark. The first, "Ashes to Ashes" backed with "Days of Love", peaked at number 14 on the IFPI Hitlisten. However, the second, "Tomorrow Rising" backed with "Help It Along", failed to chart.

"Help It Along" was re-recorded in September 1973 and included as the title track to Richard's gospel album Help It Along, released in June 1974.

== Track listing ==
7": EMI / EMI 2022

1. "Help It Along" – 2:52
2. "Tomorrow Rising" – 2:44
3. "Days of Love" – 2:57
4. "Ashes to Ashes" – 3:02

== Personnel ==
Single version

- Cliff Richard – vocals
- Terry Britten – guitar, backing vocals
- Kevin Peek – guitar
- Alan Tarney – bass guitar, backing vocals
- Trevor Spencer – drums
- Barrie Guard – percussion

Album version

- Cliff Richard – vocals
- Terry Britten – guitar
- Kevin Peek – guitar
- Alan Tarney – bass guitar
- Anna Peacock – backing vocals
- Jean Hawker – backing vocals
- Cliff Hall – keyboards
- Patrick Halling – violin, orchestra leader
- Trevor Spencer – drums
- Barrie Guard – percussion, orchestra conductor

== Chart position ==
Chart (1973)	Peak position
UK Singles (OCC)	29
