= Luciano Di Napoli =

Italian pianist and conductor

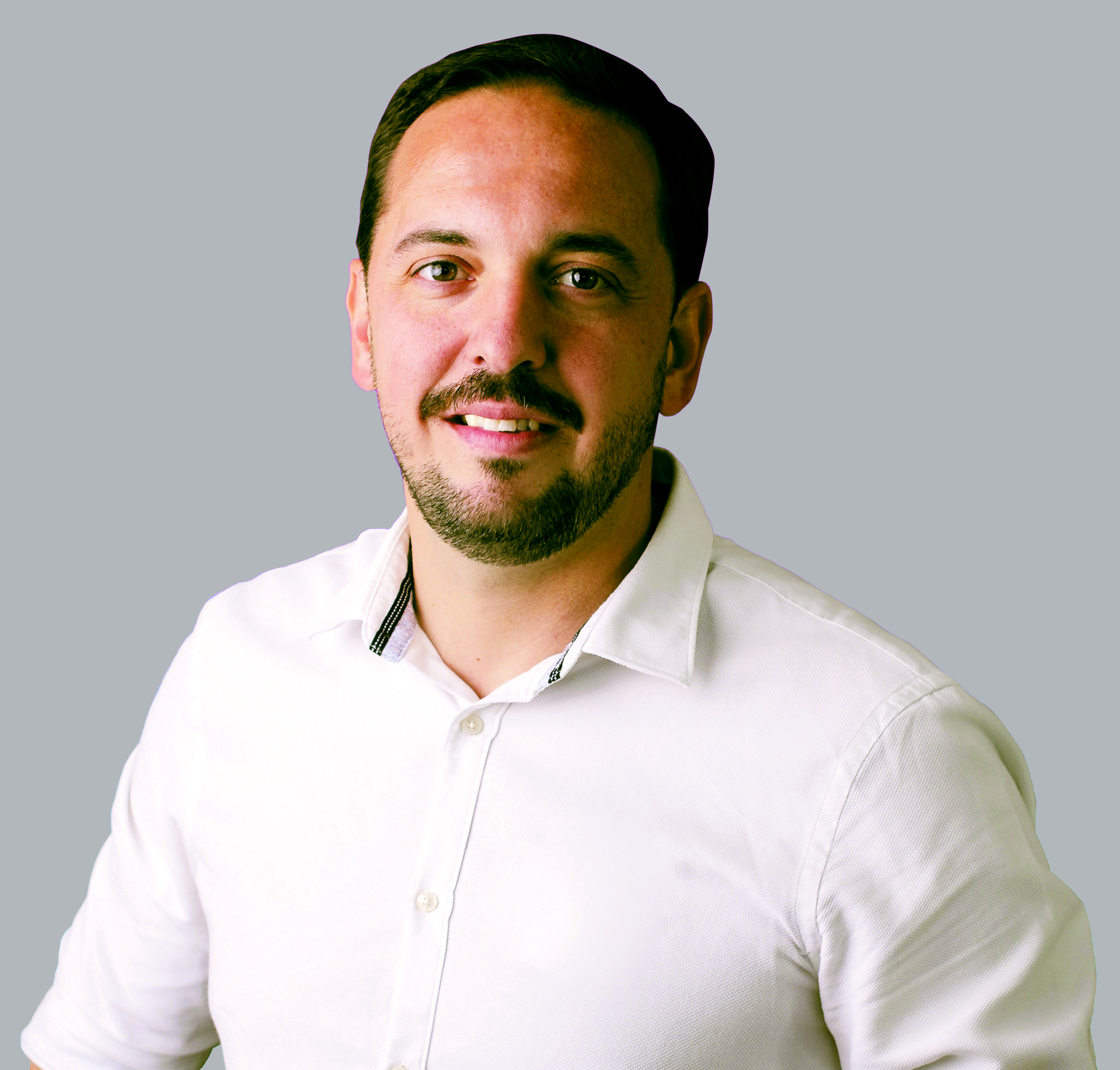
Luciano di Napoli, 2018

Luciano Di Napoli (born August 12, 1954 in Sfax, Tunisia) is an Italian pianist and conductor. He has worked with artists like Johnny Hallyday, Michel Sardou, Herbert Léonard and Nana Mouskouri.

== Biography ==
Luciano Di Napoli was born in 1954 in Sfax, in Tunisia. In 1960, he immigrated to France with his family. From 1961 to 1972, he studied solfège, trumpet, piano and the liturgical organ at the conservatory. In 1968, he formed a band with his two musician brothers. Three years later, Luciano joined the ball orchestra of Andre Bermond. From 1980 to 1984, he was a pianist for Johnny Hallyday and from 1984 to 1988, for Michel Sardou. Since 1988, he accompanies Herbert Léonard and since 1989 Nana Mouskouri.

When Luciano is at home, he spends most of his time in his own studio. He works the musical arrangements for Nana Mouskouri, Herbert Léonard and also for other productions. As Nana’s band leader, Luciano is responsible about the musician selection and together, they see about the title selection for the tour. Luciano also takes part in the album recordings. He is in charge of the arrangements and the mixing and conducts the sessions.
