= Take Me High (song) =

1973 single by Cliff Richard

- Cover of the single released in the Netherlands

Single by Cliff Richard

from the album Take Me High
- B-side: "Celestial Houses"
- Released: 9 November 1973
- Recorded: 26 May & 18 September 1973
- Studio: EMI Studios, London
- Genre: Pop
- Length: 2:45
- Label: EMI
- Songwriter(s): Tony Cole

Cliff Richard singles chronology
"Help It Along" (1973)	"Take Me High" (1973)	"(You Keep Me) Hangin' On" (1974)

"Take Me High" is a song by British singer Cliff Richard, released as a single in November 1973. Written by Tony Cole, it is the title track from the film of the same name in which Richard also stars. It was released as a single with the B-side "Celestial Houses", written by Terry Britten, and peaked at number 27 on the UK Singles Chart.

== Track listing ==
7": EMI / EMI 2088

1. "Take Me High" – 2:45
2. "Celestial Houses" – 2:46

== Personnel ==
- Cliff Richard – vocals
- Terry Britten – guitar
- Kevin Peek – guitar
- Alan Tarney – bass guitar
- Dave MacRae – keyboards
- Trevor Spencer – drums
- Barrie Guard – percussion

== Charts ==
Chart (1973)	Peak position
Australia (Kent Music Report)	88
Germany (GfK)	29
Netherlands (Dutch Top 40)	34
Netherlands (Dutch Top 40)	27
New Zealand (Listener)	6
UK Singles (OCC)	27
