= Dur dur d'être bébé! =

Single by Jordy

from the album Pochette Surprise
- Released: September 1992
- Genre: Novelty song; dance-pop; house
- Length: 3:23
- Label: Columbia
- Songwriters: Patricia Clerget; Alain Maratrat; Frédéric Taïeb
- Producer: Claude Lemoine

Jordy singles chronology
"Dur dur d'être bébé!" (1992)	"Alison (C'est ma copine à moi)" (1993)

Music video
- "Dur dur d'être bébé!" on YouTube

"Dur dur d'être bébé!", retitled "Dur dur d'être bébé! (It's Hard to Be a Baby)" for American audiences, is a 1992 song recorded by French singer Jordy Lemoine, credited as Jordy. The first single from his debut album, Pochette Surprise (1992), it was released in September 1992 by Columbia Records and achieved success across the world, particularly in France. The single reached number one in Belgium, France, Hong Kong, Italy, Greece, Mexico, Spain and Uruguay. In the US, it reached number 58 on the Billboard Hot 100. According to the Guinness Book of World Records, Jordy is the youngest singer ever to reach number one on a singles chart.

== Background ==
After having tried to involve Jordy in TV advertisements for nappies where the baby should repeat "hard, hard to be wet", Claude Lemoine, Jordy's father, had the idea of using dance music and simple lyrics to create a catchy song. The result was well received in discothèques, which convinced Lemoine to release it as a commercial single.

== Chart performance and records ==
Because of this song, Jordy was listed in the Guinness Book of World Records as the youngest singer ever to reach number one on a singles chart. He achieved this feat in France in October 1992 at the age of four and a half, beating the previous world record held by Osamu Minagawa and French record held by Elsa Lunghini. Jordy was also the youngest artist to chart on the Billboard Hot 100, reaching number 58 with the song.

"Dur dur d'être bébé!" entered the French chart at number four on 26 September 1992, rose to number two for two weeks, and then topped the chart for 15 weeks, which was the record at the time. The previous record for the longest stretch atop the French chart had belonged to Images' "Les Démons de minuit" (1986) and Licence IV's "Viens boire un p'tit coup à la maison" (1987), at 13 weeks apiece. Following its stay atop the chart, Jordy's single held the number two slot for another four weeks, eventually totalling 26 weeks in the French top ten and 30 weeks in the top 50. "Dur dur d'être bébé!" was also a dance hit across Europe, Latin America, Hong Kong and Japan. An English-language version and a mix version were also recorded and are available on the album Pochette Surprise.

== Critical reception ==
Larry Flick from Billboard magazine wrote, "Here's an artist who can make the members of Kris Kross look like old fogies." He added, "Five-year-old rapper/singer from France has topped the charts in almost every country in the free world (and a few that aren't). The concept is simple: Jordy chirps and rhymes in French about the rigors of childhood over a bouncy pop/dance beat. Top 40 pundits who regularly indulge in wacky novelty items will be salivating after the first chorus." Troy J. Augusto from Cash Box said, "Jordy, the hardest-working kindergartener in show biz. A novelty to be sure, his American intro is catchy enough that he may actually score a chart-topper here, too." A reviewer from Music Week commented, "Jordy is an impossibly cute French kid, aged four, whose vocal efforts have earned him a number one hit at home and abroad." The song was also named "a serviceable house track". Sylvia Patterson from Smash Hits gave it one out of five, writing, "It is here. The French Number One that was on the news and Trevor McDonald and pals looked a bit wry around the eyebrows. "It's crap being a tot", "sings" the tiddler in French and lots of mums go all googly and send it burbling chartwards. It is a dance thing of no discernable worth, and embryonic European novelty sensations cannot save us now."

== Cover versions ==
In 2010, the song was covered by Bébé Lilly and released as single in France, where it hit number 15 for two weeks on the singles chart.

== Track listings ==
- 7-inch single
1. "Dur dur d'être bébé !" (single mix) – 3:23
2. "Dur dur d'être bébé !" (techno mix) – 4:07
- 12-inch maxi
1. "Dur dur d'être bébé !" (single mix) – 3:23
2. "Dur dur d'être bébé !" (techno mix) – 4:07
- CD single
1. "Dur dur d'être bébé !" (single mix) – 3:23
2. "Dur dur d'être bébé !" (techno mix) – 4:07
- CD maxi
1. "Dur dur d'être bébé !" (single mix) – 3:24
2. "Dur dur d'être bébé !" (club mix) – 5:21
3. "Dur dur d'être bébé !" (dob mix) – 5:21
4. "Dur dur d'être bébé !" (techno mix) – 4:07
- Cassette
1. "Dur dur d'être bébé !" (single mix) – 3:23
2. "Dur dur d'être bébé !" (techno mix) – 4:07

== Charts ==
=== Weekly charts ===
Weekly chart performance for "Dur dur d'être bébé !"
Chart (1992–1993)	Peak position
Australia (ARIA)	37
Austria (Ö3 Austria Top 40)	3
Belgium (VRT Top 30 Flanders)	3
Belgium (Ultratop Wallonia)	1
Dominican Republic (UPI)	8
El Salvador (UPI)	7
Finland (Suomen virallinen lista)	2
France (SNEP)	1
Greece (Pop + Rock)	1
Hong Kong (HK Singles Chart)	1
Iceland (Íslenski Listinn Topp 40)	4
Israel (Israeli Singles Chart)	7
Italy (Musica e dischi)	1
Mexico (AMPROFON)	1
Netherlands (Dutch Top 40)	3
Netherlands (Single Top 100)	3
New Zealand (RIANZ)	8
Norway (VG-lista)	5
Peru (UPI)	2
Portugal (AFP)	6
Quebec (ADISQ)	16
Spain (AFYVE)	1
Sweden (Topplistan)	14
Switzerland (Schweizer Hitparade)	20
Uruguay (UPI)	1
Venezuela (UPI)	9
US Billboard Hot 100	58
US Hot Latin Tracks (Billboard)	11
US Cash Box Top 100	49

=== Year-end charts ===
1992 year-end chart performance for "Dur dur d'être bébé !"
Chart (1992)	Position
Europe (Eurochart Hot 100)	64

1993 year-end chart performance for "Dur dur d'être bébé !"
Chart (1993)	Position
Netherlands (Dutch Top 40)	89
Sweden (Topplistan)	99

== Certifications ==
Certifications for "Dur dur d'être bébé !"
Region	Certification	Certified units/sales
France (SNEP)	Platinum	500,000^{*}
^{*} Sales figures based on certification alone.

== See also ==
- List of number-one singles of 1992 (France)
- List of number-one singles of 1993 (France)
