= Capitaine abandonné =

1985 single by Gold

Single by Gold

from the album Capitaine abandonné
- B-side: "Jossy-Ann"
- Released: December 1985
- Recorded: France, 1985
- Genre: Pop
- Length: 3:54
- Label: Wea
- Songwriter(s): Lucien Crémadès; Émile Wandelmer; Bernard Mazauric

Gold singles chronology
"Plus près des étoiles" (1985)	"Capitaine abandonné" (1985)	"Ville de lumière" (1986)

"Capitaine abandonné" is a 1985 song recorded by French band Gold. It was the lead single from the band's second studio album Capitaine abandonné on which it features in an extended version as first track. The song was also available in its main version on the next album Calicoba, released in late 1986. "Capitaine abandonné" was released as Gold's second single overall in January 1986, and met with a success in France where it was a number-one hit.

== Lyrics and video ==
"Capitaine abandonné" is a tribute to celebrities of sports, adventure and singing such as Arnaud de Rosnay or Philippe de Dieuleveult. The music video shows the group performing the song in a bar where men are playing cards, and these images alternate with scenes of navigation during the chorus.

== Versions ==
"Capitaine abandonné" was recorded in a live version on the live album L'Olympia (1997), Le Palais des Sports (1999) and Live 2004 (2004) and was included on Gold's compilations La Compil' en Or (1990) and Les Plus Grands Succès (1995). In 2002, the song was covered by Axel Bauer, Patrick Fiori and Gérald De Palmas, and this 3:09 version is the ninth track on Les Enfoirés' album Tous dans le même bateau.

== Chart performance ==
In France, "Capitaine abandonné" entered the singles chart at number 35 on 8 February 1986, reached the top ten in its sixth week, topped the chart for four weeks, and totaled 13 weeks in the top ten and 24 weeks in the top 50. On the Music & Media's Eurochart Hot 100, it stated at number 87 on 22 February 1986, attained a peak of number 25 in its 11th week, and fell off the chart after 21 weeks of presence. It also spent 12 weeks on the Eurochart Airplay Top 50 with a peak at number 17 twice.

== Track listings ==
- 7" single
1. "Capitaine abandonné" — 3:54
2. "Josy-Ann" — 3:34
- 7" maxi
1. "Capitaine abandonné" (extended version) — 6:26
2. "Josy-Ann" — 3:34
- 12" maxi - Remixes
1. "Capitaine abandonné" (remix) — 6:37
2. "Sail Away" (English version) — 3:54

== Charts ==
=== Weekly charts ===
Weekly chart performance for "Capitaine abandonné"
Chart (1986)	Peak position
Europe (European Hot 100)	25
Europe (European Airplay Top 50)	17
France (SNEP)	1
Quebec (ADISQ)	15

=== Year-end charts ===
Year-end chart performance for "Capitaine abandonné"
Chart (1986)	Position
Europe (European Hot 100)	67

== Certifications and sales ==
Certifications for "Capitaine abandonné"
Region	Certification	Certified units/sales
France (SNEP)	Gold	500,000^{*}
^{*} Sales figures based on certification alone.

== See also ==
- List of number-one singles of 1986 (France)
