= Derrière l'amour =

1976 single by Johnny Hallyday

Single by Johnny Hallyday

from the album Derrière l'amour
- Language: French
- English title: Behind love
- B-side: "Joue pas de rock'n'roll pour moi"
- Released: May 1976
- Recorded: 1976
- Studio: Studio 92, Boulogne-Billancourt
- Genre: Chanson, Pop rock
- Length: 4:40
- Label: Philips
- Songwriter(s): Toto Cutugno, Vito Pallavicini, Pierre Delanoë
- Producer(s): Jacques Revaux

Johnny Hallyday singles chronology
"Requiem pour un fou" (1976)	"Derrière l'amour" / "Joue pas de rock'n'roll pour moi" (1976)	"Gabrielle" (1976)

"Dietro l'amore"

Single by Toto Cutugno
- Language: Italian
- B-side: "Come ieri, come oggi, come sempre"
- Released: June 1976
- Recorded: 1976
- Genre: Pop
- Length: 4:15
- Label: CBS
- Songwriter(s): Toto Cutugno, Vito Pallavicini

Toto Cutugno singles chronology
"Dietro l'amore" (1976)	"Fly" (1976)

"Derrière l'amour" ("Behind love") is a song by Johnny Hallyday, It was released as the spohomore single off of Hallyday's studio album of the same name and spent six consecutive weeks at no. 1 on the singles sales chart in France (from 3 to 16 June 1976 and from 22 July to 18 August 1976).

== Background and composition ==
The song was written by French lyricist Pierre Delanoë over a composition by Toto Cutugno.

Toto Cutugno himself recorded an Italian version with lyrics by Vito Pallavicini, titled "Dietro l'amore". The Italian version was released by him as a single in Italy.

== Track listing ==
=== Johnny Hallyday version ("Derrière l'amour") ===
7" single Philips 6042 16 (France, etc.)

1. "Derrière l'amour (4:40)"
2. "Joue pas de rock'n'roll pour moi" ("Don't Play Your Rock 'n' Roll to Me") (3:33)

=== Toto Cutugno version ("Dietro l'amore") ===
7" single CBS 4465 (Italy)

1. "Dietro l'amore"
2. "Come ieri, come oggi, come sempre"

== Charts ==
Johnny Hallyday version ("Derrière l'amour")

Chart (1976)	Peak position
France (singles sales)	1
Chart (2014)	Peak position
France (SNEP)	129
