= Alison (C'est ma copine à moi) =

1993 single by Jordy

Single by Jordy

from the album Pochette Surprise
- B-side: "Dur dur d'être bébé ! (club mix)"
- Released: February 1993
- Recorded: 1992
- Genre: Pop, dance, children's song
- Length: 3:41
- Label: Versailles, Sony Music
- Songwriters: Claude Lemoine, Patricia Clerget, Alain Maratrat
- Producer: Claude Lemoine

Jordy singles chronology
"Dur dur d'être bébé !" (1992)	"Alison (C'est ma copine à moi)" (1993)	"Les Boules" (1993)

"Alison (C'est ma copine à moi)", often simply known as "Alison", is a 1992 song recorded by French singer Jordy Lemoine, credited as Jordy. It was produced and co-written by Claude Lemoine and released as the second single from Jordy's debut album, Pochette Surprise (1992). It achieved some success in France and the francophone part of Belgium, where it peaked as number one, though it had not the same massive success as that of "Dur dur d'être bébé !"

== Chart performance ==
"Alison (C'est ma copine à moi)" first charted in Belgium (Wallonia), where it debuted at number two on 27 February 1993, then peaked at number one for three weeks in March 1993. In France, it entered the single chart straight at number four on 6 March 1993, gained one place every week, so hit number one from its fourth week, thus dislodging Whitney Houston's international hit "I Will Always Love You". It stayed for five weeks atop, then spent four non consecutive weeks at number two after being dethroned by 2 Unlimited's "No Limit"; it remained in the top ten for 15 weeks and in the top 50 for 19 weeks, dropping from number 11 to number 41 the last week. It achieved Silver status, awarded by the Syndicat National de l'Édition Phonographique. Additionally, it was number six in Finland, and number 22 in Belgium (Flanders). On the European Hot 100 Singles, it debuted at number 53 on 27 February 1993, reached its highest position, number 13, in its 10th and 11th weeks, and cumulated 21 weeks of presence. In Mexico, it topped the chart for two weeks, dislodging atop Jordy's previous single "Dur dur d'être bébé !".

== Track listings ==
- 7" single - France
1. "Alison (C'est ma copine à moi)" — 3:41
2. "Dur dur d'être bébé !" (club mix) — 5:22
- CD single - Europe
1. "Alison (C'est ma copine à moi)" — 3:41
2. "Dur dur d'être bébé !" (club mix) — 5:22
- 12" maxi - France, Spain, Netherlands
1. "Alison (C'est ma copine à moi)" (dance mix) — 5:12
2. "Alison (C'est ma copine à moi)" (alternate mix) — 4:51
3. "Alison (C'est ma copine à moi)" (smooth vibe mix) — 4:54
- 12" maxi - Netherlands
1. "Alison (C'est ma copine à moi)" (baby mix) — 4:49
2. "Alison (C'est ma copine à moi)" (album version) — 3:41
3. "Alison (C'est ma copine à moi)" (adult underground mix) — 4:53
- 12" single - Mexico
1. "Alison (C'est ma copine à moi)" — 3:41
2. "Dur dur d'être bébé !" — 3:24
- 12" single - Brazil
1. "Alison (C'est ma copine à moi)" (LP version)
2. "Alison (C'est ma copine à moi)" (remix version)
- CD maxi - Germany
1. "Alison (C'est ma copine à moi)" (dance mix) — 5:13
2. "Alison (C'est ma copine à moi)" (alternate mix) — 4:53
3. "Alison (C'est ma copine à moi)" (smooth vibe mix) — 4:54
4. "Alison (C'est ma copine à moi)" — 3:41
- Cassette - France
1. "Alison (C'est ma copine à moi)" — 3:41
2. "Dur dur d'être bébé !" (club mix) — 5:22

== Charts ==
=== Weekly charts ===
Chart (1993)	Peak position
Belgium (Ultratop 50 Flanders)	22
Belgium (Ultratop 50 Wallonia)	1
Europe (European Hot 100)	13
Finland (Suomen virallinen lista)	6
France (SNEP)	1
Iceland (Íslenski Listinn Topp 40)	12
Mexico (AMPROFON)	1
Peru (UPI)	5
Uruguay (UPI)	8

=== Year-end charts ===
Chart (1993)	Position
Europe (Eurochart Hot 100)	45

== Certifications ==
Certifications for "Alison (C'est ma copine à moi)"
Region	Certification	Certified units/sales
France (SNEP)	Silver	125,000^{*}
^{*} Sales figures based on certification alone.

== See also ==
- List of number-one singles of 1993 (France)
- List of number-one hits of 1993 (Mexico)
