= Mets de l'huile =

1993 single by Regg'Lyss

Single by Regg'Lyss

from the album Vive les gestes
- B-side: "Le Rocher"
- Released: July 1993
- Recorded: 1993
- Studio: Lakanal
- Genre: Reggae, rap
- Length: 4:08
- Label: Virgin
- Songwriters: Bernard Levesque, Doumé Levesque, Roland Ramade
- Producers: Regg'Lyss, Philippe Verdier

Regg'Lyss singles chronology
"Vive les gestes" (1993)	"Mets de l'huile" (1993)

"Mets de l'huile", also titled "Regg'Lyss... Mets de l'huile" on the parent album, is a 1993 reggae song recorded by French act Regg'Lyss. Written and composed by the band members, it was the second single from their debut studio album Vives les gestes, on which it appears as the seventh track, and was released in July 1993. It achieved success in France where it was a number one hit and became a popular song throughout years.

== Background ==
Several record companies, including RCA, Sony, Polygram and Virgin, were contacted to establish a contract with the group. Philippe Ascoli, A&R director for Virgin, explained that initially he was not interested in the song, but impressed after meeting the band's singer Roland Ramade, he changed his mind and Regg'Lyss eventually signed with the record company on 18 June 1993. From this date, the French main radios, including Skyrock, Fun Radio and Europe 2, started to play "Mets de l'huile", released as a single on 6 July. Virgin established a collaboration with the main regional newspaper Midi Libre and the local radio station NRJ Montpellier to promote the song; moreover, a regional concert tour (so in Languedoc) was planned to draw national attention and to make appear Regg'Lyss as a live band.

Success came very quickly and the group, which was only an association at the start, had to set up as an Société à responsabilité limitée. According to Ramade, "Mets de l'huile" was even aired in regions like Brazil or New Caledonia; in addition, as a sign of popularity, many cover versions of were released at the same time of the original release. There were two CD singles with different B-sides: one with "Le Rocher", the other with "Vive les gestes", the first single from the album.

== Music and lyrics ==
"Mets de l'huile" uses a sample from Linton Kwesi Johnson's 1979 song "Want Fi Goh Rave". Elia Habib, an expert of the French charts, deemed that the song is a synthesis between reggae and southern rap, with exaggerated occitan accents and humorous words.

Lyrics are sung by Ramade, who portrays two characters in the course of the song: the false Rastafari from Languedoc who tries to sing in English and the Regg'Lyss singer (from Languedoc as well) who complains of not understanding anything in the song.

In 2019, Ramade explicited the song's meaning, saying: "This is a song that is still relevant today. It's about tolerance. That even if we don't look alike, even if we don't speak the same language, we have to stand one another, we have to live together".

== Critical reception ==
According to Habib, "Mets de l'huile" "surprises with its variegated colors and its rhythms oscillating between the nonchalance of reggae and the dynamism of brassy verses". A review in Music & Media stated that the song "has all characteristics of a summer hit: you can dance to its reggae groove, you can hum it".

== Chart performance ==
In France, "Mets de l'huile" debuted at number 21 on the chart edition of 24 July 1993, which was the highest debut that week; then it climbed every week and topped the chart for non consecutive two weeks, in its eighth and 13th weeks, and remained for a total of 32 weeks in the top 50, 21 of them in the top ten. On the European Hot 100, it started at number 96 on 7 August 1993, reached a peak of number 19 in its tenth and eleventh weeks, and appears on the chart until the French Singles chart was withdrawn by Music & Media to establish the Eurochart Hot 100, on 6 November 1993. It also charted for five weeks on the West Regional EHR Top 20, with a peak at number nine in its first and third weeks.

== Track listings ==
- CD single 1
1. "Regg'Lyss... Mets de l'huile" — 4:11
2. "Vive les gestes" — 4:05
- CD single 2
1. "Regg'Lyss... Mets de l'huile" — 4:08
2. "Le Rocher" — 3:27
- 12" single
1. "Regg'Lyss... Mets de l'huile" — 4:08
2. "Le Rocher" — 3:27
- Cassette
1. "Regg'Lyss... Mets de l'huile" — 4:08
2. "Le Rocher" — 3:27
- 7" single - Promo
1. "Regg'Lyss... Mets de l'huile" — 4:08
2. "Le Rocher" — 3:27

== Charts ==
Chart (1993)	Peak position
Europe (Eurochart Hot 100)	19
France (Airplay Chart)	9
France (SNEP)	1

== Release history ==
Country	Date	Format	Label
France	1993	CD single 1	Discadanse
France	1993	CD single 2	Virgin
France	1993	12" single	Virgin
France	1993	Cassette	Virgin
France	1993	Promotional 7" single	Virgin

== See also ==
- List of number-one singles of 1993 (France)
