= Take Me High =

1973 British film by David Askey

- Theatrical release poster
- Directed by: David Askey
- Written by: Christopher Penfold
- Produced by: Kenneth Harper
- Starring: Cliff Richard; Deborah Watling; Hugh Griffith; George Cole
- Cinematography: Norman Warwick
- Music by: Tony Cole
- Production companies: The Brumburger Company; Balladeer Ltd
- Distributed by: Anglo-EMI Film Distributors Ltd.
- Release date: December 1973 (UK)
- Running time: 90 min.
- Country: United Kingdom
- Language: English
- Budget: £400,000

Take Me High (also known as Hot Property) is a 1973 British film directed by David Askey and starring Cliff Richard (in his final film role), Deborah Watling, Hugh Griffith, George Cole and Anthony Andrews. It was written by Christopher Penfold.

== Plot ==
Tim, a merchant banker, is sent to Birmingham, instead of New York, where he would prefer to go. He becomes involved in a local restaurant and falls in love with local girl, Sarah.

Tim arranges for peace between the capitalist Sir Harry Cunningham and left-wing politician Bert Jackson. Tim and Sarah co-found a new burger bar selling "Brumburgers".

== Cast ==
- Cliff Richard as Tim Matthews
- Deborah Watling (credited as Debbie Watling) as Sarah
- Hugh Griffith as Sir Harry Cunningham
- George Cole as Bert Jackson
- Anthony Andrews as Hugo Flaxman
- Richard Wattis as Sir Charles Furness
- Madeline Smith as Vicki
- Moyra Fraser as Molly
- Ronald Hines as Sam
- Jimmy Gardner as Hulbert
- Noel Trevarthen as Paul
- Graham Armitage as Boardman
- John Franklyn-Robbins as Alderman
- Peter Marshall as grandson
- Elizabeth Scott as waitress
- Polly Williams as receptionist

== Production ==
The movie was produced by Kenneth Harper, who had produced Richard's first three starring vehicles in the early 1960s. It was announced for production in May 1973 by Nat Cohen of EMI Films under the title Hot Property.

It was Richard's first studio movie since Finders Keepers in 1966, although he had starred in the 1968 film Two a Penny for Billy Graham's World Wide Pictures. "It really is good to be back making a big film," he said.

"Cliff finds a girlfriend in the picture but there is no marriage scene," said Harper.

Filming began on 4 June in Birmingham. The movie features many landmarks from the city, including Gas Street Basin, Alpha Tower, the Council House (as a hotel), Spaghetti Junction, New Street, Corporation Street, Central Library and the Hall of Memory.

Richard said during filming that "it's a happy film and its message, if any, is a fun one. I wouldn't play in a film which I thought likely to have any bad influence. I shall be able to take my Mum to the premiere of Hot Property without feeling embarrassed about what she'll see – that's my standard."

== Soundtrack ==
Take Me High

Soundtrack album by Cliff Richard
- Released: December 1973
- Recorded: 26–29 May & 3–6 September 1973
- Genre: Pop
- Label: Columbia (EMI) SCX6435
- Producer: David Mackay

Cliff Richard chronology
The Best of Cliff Volume Two (1972)	Take Me High (1973)	Help It Along (1974)

Singles from Take Me High
- 1. "Take Me High" Released: November 1973

A soundtrack album was released in December 1973 (UK LP: EMI – EMC 3016, UK CD: EMI – 7243 4 77731 2 9). The title track was a UK top 30 single (No. 27), and the album peaked at No. 41.

=== Track listing ===
Side One

1. "It's Only Money" (Tony Cole)
2. "Midnight Blue" (Tony Cole)
3. "Hover" (Instrumental, The David Mackay Orchestra) (Tony Cole)
4. "Why?" (with Anthony Andrews) (Tony Cole)
5. "Life" (Tony Cole)
6. "Driving" (Tony Cole)
7. "The Game" (Tony Cole)
8. "Brumburger Duet" (with Debbie Watling) (Tony Cole)

Side Two

1. "Take Me High" (Tony Cole)
2. "The Anti-Brotherhood of Man" (Tony Cole)
3. "Winning" (Tony Cole)
4. "Driving" (Instrumental, The David Mackay Orchestra) (Tony Cole)
5. "Join the Band" (Tony Cole)
6. "The Word is Love" (Tony Cole)
7. "Brumburger (Finale)" (Tony Cole)

== Releases ==
It was released on VHS by Warner Home Video in 1988. It was not given a retail release on DVD until March 2019, although a free DVD of the film was issued with the Daily Mail on 25 September 2010.

== Reception ==
In The Guardian, Derek Malcolm wrote "Richard acts personably enough... not too bad as British musicals go."

The Monthly Film Bulletin wrote: "An inauspicious feature debut for director David Askey, also marking Cliff Richard's first screen appearance since his Billy Graham vehicle of six years ago. Despite the plot's pretensions to social panacea, this is just one more creaky vehicle to display his charm and well-preserved good looks. The curious attempt to provide some realistic ballast by casting the star in the unlikely role of a merchant banker, and by relegating the songs to soundtrack accompaniment, is offset by the fact that the director's one discernible ambition is to capture as many pretty shots of Richard as possible. Hugh Griffith is left to provide scant light relief as the inevitable rumbustious eccentric."

Filmink's Stephen Vagg, writing in 2025, called the film "a love letter to hamburgers and the city of Birmingham... an attempt to repeat the success of Cliff Richards' early 1960s musicals but done cheaply and weirdly (characters sometimes sing on screen, other times sing in voice over)."

The Radio Times Guide to Films gave the film 1/5 stars, writing: "The 'comedy' plods along with all the zip of Spaghetti Junction at rush hour. Indigestible."

Leslie Halliwell said: "Jaded youth musical with no dancing but some zip and bounce to commend it to mums and dads if not to its intended young audience."

Academic Paul Moody wrote:

The film is so strange, at times jaw-droppingly weird, that it has the same intoxicating power of an Ed Wood film. It is difficult to think of any British film like it, and it undeniably has historical value in its depiction of Birmingham in the 1970s. But like most films of this ilk... it is difficult to analyse historically, because it feels almost out of its own time, a film that sits outside of the usual boundaries of normal cinema.

Writer Catherine O'Flynn observed:

Take Me High is a mind-bogglingly strange film. A critique of rapacious capitalism. A hymn to a second city. A vehicle for a flagging pop star. A film about a hamburger. It's a musical without hits and a comedy without jokes. It's one of a kind. It failed to successfully repackage and rebrand Cliff Richard but it was years ahead in its imagining of a repackaged, rebranded post-industrial city.
