= Regg'Lyss =

- Origin: Montpellier, Occitanie, France
- Genres: Reggae
- Years active: 1989 - 1997

Regg'Lyss was a French reggae group (French-language pun between "reggae", "glisse" and "réglisse").

== History ==
The group was established in 1989 in Montpellier (Languedoc) and gathered a dozen of friends who wanted to explore a new style, the Jamadoc, "a musical Esperanto for a country fantasized between Jamaica and Occitania."

Quickly, the group achieved local success in the south of France. After a selection at the Printemps de Bourges in 1990, the band released their first album, Vive les gestes, in 1992. Their song "Mets de l'huile" became one of the greatest successes in the years 1993/1994 in France, reaching number 1 twice on the French SNEP Singles Chart, and remaining for 32 consecutive weeks in the Top 50. The group was appointed to the Victoires de la Musique.

Regg'lyss split after the release of their third album because it failed to be successful.

== Members ==
- Roland Ramade - singing and harmonica
- Doumé Levesque - drum
- Rémi Levesque - rhythm guitar
- Bernard Levesque - keyboards
- Christian Azéma - percussion
- Zawé Fizin - melodic guitar
- Pierre Diaz - tenor saxophone
- Alexandre Augé - alto and soprano saxophones
- Victor Fanjul - trumpet
- André Fauquier - trombone

== Discography ==
- 1993 : Vive les gestes
1. "Vive les gestes"
2. "Le comptoir"
3. "Patates crues"
4. "Le rocher"
5. "Jamadoc"
6. "En attendant Victor"
7. "Regg'Lyss,... mets de l'huile"
8. "La poupée"
9. "Pose mes valises"
10. "Tronia treijepine"
- 1995 : El gusanillo
1. "Non, le reggae n'est pas mort"
2. "El gusanillo"
3. "Le café des super-vedettes"
4. "Le dormeur Duval"
5. "Bouge !"
6. "Les deux sœurs"
7. "Les hanches passent"
8. "Paradis, boîte à sardine"
9. "T'as déjà vu la mer ?"
10. "Sans queue ni tête"
11. "Pas la peine"
12. "Le petit chemin"
13. "Ils vont payer"
14. "Parce que l'on aime"
- 1997 : Le monde tourne
1. "J'aime les mots"
2. "La musique sera ma revanche"
3. "Bronze un coup"
4. "Ça va mieux"
5. "Les 3 ombres"
6. "Je suis venu te dire que je m'en vais"
7. "Yes papa"
8. "Ketre Tharei"
9. "Le monde tourne"
10. "Sans cette espérance"
11. "Le fantome"
