= Gold (band) =

French pop band

- Origin: Toulouse, Occitanie, France
- Genres: Pop
- Years active: 1982–present
- Members: Lucien Crémadès; Alain Llorca; Bernard Mazauric; Etienne Salvador; Emile Wandelmer

Gold is a French music band from Toulouse, which enjoyed considerable success in the Francophone world in the 1980s.

== History ==
Gold was originally composed of five musicians : Lucien Crémadès (guitar, vocals), Alain Llorca (bass, vocals), Bernard Mazauric (keyboards), Etienne Salvador (drums) and lead singer/guitarist Emile Wandelmer.

The group first rose to prominence with the 1985 release of "Plus près des étoiles", and continued to impact on the French pop charts with songs including "Capitaine abandonné" (n°1 in 1986), "Ville de lumière" and "Laissez-nous chanter". Wandelmer left the group in 1990, going on to join Images eight years later, although the remaining members of Gold continued recording.

Gold is one of the only French groups to have made France's SNEP Top 10 five consecutive times between 1985 and 1987.

== Discography ==
=== Albums ===
- Gold (1982)
1. "Crise d'amour cardiaque"
2. "T'es pas fou"
3. "Sans façon"
4. "Fou y es-tu"
5. "Jean's et strass"
6. "Le train de mes souvenirs"
7. "Difficile d'oublier"
8. "Tropicana"
9. "Plus loin"
10. "Seul dans l'univers"
- Gold' (1984)
1. "Tropicana""
2. "T'es pas fou"
3. "Jean's et strass"
4. "Le train de mes souvenirs"
5. "Plus près des étoiles"
6. "Je m'ennuie de tout"
7. "Plus loin"
8. "Crise d'amour cardiaque"
- Le Train de mes souvenirs' (September 1984)
1. "Plus près des étoiles"
2. "T'es pas fou"
3. "Sans façon"
4. "Jean's et strass"
5. "Le train de mes souvenirs"
6. "Tropicana"
7. "J'm'ennuie de tout"
8. "Plus loin"
9. "Crise d'amour cardiaque"
10. "Seul dans l'univers"
- Capitaine abandonné (September 1986)
1. "Capitaine abandonné" (extended version)
2. "Le train de mes souvenirs"
3. "Ville de lumière" (extended version)
4. "Josy-Ann"
5. "Plus près des étoiles" (extended version)
6. "Lady Baby doll"
7. "J’mennuie de tout"
8. "Tropicana"
- Calicoba' (December 1986)
1. "Laissez-nous chanter"
2. "Du vent, du bluff, des mots"
3. "Josy-Ann"
4. "Demain sans doute"
5. "Lady Baby Doll"
6. "Calicoba"
7. "Ville de lumière"
8. "Pour toi la musique"
9. "Capitaine Abandonné" (tempête)
- Let the children play' (1986)
1. "Let the Children Play"
2. "Window Wonder World"
3. "Josy-Ann"
4. "Only Love That's Really True"
5. "Lady Rock'n Roll"
6. "Carli come back"
7. "Crying in the city"
8. "It's only a dream"
9. "Sail Away (tempête)"
- L'Olympia' (1987)
1. "Intro"
2. "Laissez-nous chanter"
3. "Tropicana"
4. "Plus près des étoiles"
5. "Lady Baby Doll"
6. "Capitaine abandonné"
7. "J'm'ennuie de tout"
8. "Le train de mes souvenirs"
9. "L'Aziza"
10. "Plus loin" (only on the CD)
11. "T'es pas fou" (only on the CD)
12. "Ville de lumière"
- Bleu' (July 1988)
1. "Fils des Highlands"
2. "Rio de Janvier"
3. "Rock ou pas"
4. "Melinda, viens"
5. "Diamant dort"
6. "A l'est d'Eden"
7. "Spleen"
8. "Au-delà du rideau"
9. "Des matins bleus"
- Le Palais des Sports' (April 1989)
1. "Fils des Highlands"
2. "Rock ou pas"
3. "Au-delà du rideau"
4. "Rio de Janvier"
5. "Diamant dort"
6. "Calicoba"
7. "Melinda, viens"
8. "Spleen"
9. "Laissez-nous chanter"
10. "Ville de lumière"
11. "Capitaine abandonné"
12. "Plus près des étoiles"
13. "A l'est d'Eden"
14. "Des matins bleus"
- La Compil' en Or' (March 1990)
1. "Laissez-nous chanter"
2. "Du vent du bluff des mots"
3. "Au-delà du rideau"
4. "Demain sans doute"
5. "Ville de lumière"
6. "Calicoba"
7. "Fils des Highlands"
8. "Capitaine Abandonné"
9. "T'es pas fou"
10. "Rio de Janvier"
11. "Tropicana"
12. "Melinda, viens"
13. "Le train de mes souvenirs"
14. "Diamant dort"
15. "Plus près des étoiles"
16. "Josy-Ann"
17. "Iles d'Aran"
18. "Pour toi la musique"
- Eclats de voix' (1994)
1. "Louise, ma Louisiane"
2. "L'homme perdu"
3. "Dalaï Lama"
4. "Soleil enfin"
5. "Coup double en enfer"
6. "Jersey"
7. "Macadam rêveur"
8. "Passer la rivière"
9. "Cheyenne"
- Les Plus Grands Succès' (Compilation) (1995, reissued in 2002)
1. "Plus près des étoiles"
2. "Capitaine abondonné"
3. "Ville de Lumière"
4. "Calicoba"
5. "Laissez-Nous Chanter"
6. "Rio De Janvier"
7. "Pour Toi La Musique"
8. "Iles D'aran"
9. "Au-Delà Du Rideau"
10. "L'est D'éden"
11. "Melinda, Viens"
12. "Diamant Dort"
13. "Fils De Highlands"
14. "Josy-Ann"
15. "Rock ou pas"
16. "Du Vent, du Bluff, des Mots"
- Gold 99' (1999)
1. "Hello"
2. "Si haut"
3. "Voler du temps"
4. "Le fils du pêcheur"
5. "Même si je perds le nord"
6. "Pendant c'temps"
7. "Les yeux des métis"
8. "Le long chemin"
9. "Les voix du Pacifique"
10. "Si je savais"
11. "Samarkand"
- Live 2004' (2004)
1. "Fils des highlands"
2. "Si haut"
3. "Ville de lumière"
4. "Calicoba"
5. "Summer in the City"
6. "Spleen"
7. "Rio de janvier"
8. "Plus près des étoiles"
9. "Laissez nous chanter"
10. "Capitaine abandonné"

=== Singles ===
Year	Title	Peak positions
Year	Title	FR
1982	"Tropicana"	–
1984	"Plus près des étoiles"	2
1984	"A Little Closer to Freedom" (English version of "Plus près des étoiles")	–
1985	"Capitaine abandonné"	1
1985	"Sail Away" (English version of "Capitaine abandonné")	–
1986	"Ville de lumière"	2
1987	"Laissez-nous chanter"	6
1987	"Calicoba"	8

=== Other hits and singles ===
- "Au-delà du rideau" (1988) - #46 in France
- "Rio de janvier" (1988) - #18 in France
- "Diamant dort" (1989) - #34 in France
- "Iles d'Aran" (1989)
- "Jersey" (1994)
- "L'homme Perdu" (1994)
- "Soleil Enfin" (1994)
- "Hello" (1999)
- "Le long chemin" (1999)

=== Videography ===
- Le Palais des Sports de Gold (1989)
- Les Clips en Or (1990)

== Awards ==
In November 1986, the band were named 'Best Newcomer' at the annual Victoires de la musique ceremony.
