= Pacifique (band) =

French band

- Origin: France
- Genres: Rock, Pop
- Years active: 1988–1994
- Members: Christophe Després; Stéphane Després; Cathy Nozeran (née Lajous)

Pacifique was a French group founded in 1988.

It is a trio composed of two brothers, Christophe and Stéphane Després (musicians), and Cathy Nozeran née Lajous (singer). After their unsuccessful single "Sur les ailes des alizés" in 1988, they had their moment of glory with hits such as "Quand tu serres mon corps" and "Sans un remords", respectively #4 in November 1989 (Gold disc), and #15 in August 1990, on the French SNEP Singles Chart (Top 50). Another song, "Another Love in L.A.", ranked #40 in the end of 1990.

Their two albums California, released in 1991, and Anges ou Démons in 1994, have not been successful.

Most of their songs deals with love and sex themes.

== Discography ==
=== Singles ===
- "Sur les ailes des alizés" (1988)
- "Quand tu serres mon corps" (1989)
- "Sans un remords" (1990)
- "Another Love in L.A." (1990)
- "Quelque chose en toi" (1991)
- "Il y a toujours quelque part" (1993)

=== Albums ===
- California (1991)
- Anges ou Démons (1994)
- Best of Pacifique (compilation, 2003)

=== Songs not released as singles ===
- "Anges ou Démons"
- "Chacun cherche sa voie"
- "Les Bateaux"
- "Comme Rimbaud comme Verlaine"
- "Manhattan"
- "Quelque chose en toi"
- "Sous les Baobabs"
- "Mélancolie"
- "D'Amour en hérésie"
