= Ève lève-toi =

Single by Julie Pietri

from the album Le Premier Jour
- B-side: "L'homme qui aimait les femmes"
- Released: August 1986
- Recorded: Tunisia (video)
- Genre: Pop
- Length: 4:33
- Label: CBS
- Songwriters: Jean-Michel Bériat; Julie Pietri; Vincent-Marie Bouvot

Julie Pietri singles chronology
"La chanson de la vie" (1985)	"Ève lève-toi" (1986)	"Nuit sans issue" (1987)

"Ève lève-toi" is a pop single recorded by French Julie Pietri from her third album Le Premier Jour, and was released in August 1986. It is the best-known song of this artist and can be considered as her signature song. It reached the top position on the SNEP Singles Chart and became a popular song throughout the years.

== Writing ==
Written by Julie Pietri and Jean-Michel Bériat with a music by Vincent-Marie Bouvot, "Ève lève-toi" is widely considered as a female anthem which originality particularly lies in the sometimes Arabist melody, which recalls that Pietri was born in Algeria. The music video was filmed in Tunisia. Specialist of French chart Elia Habib explained about "Ève lève-toi": "The atmosphere built by the song is that of an Eastern Eden, scene of the Origins. The melody and the orchestration refer to the undulating play of a bewitching flute. The scenery is set, and the text completes it, with short verses without verb : desire, temptation, original sin, vague recollections... (...) The chorus appeals to the celebration of the life while (...) the second verse [is about] the contemporary woman and underlines its multiplicity".

== Versions ==
In the late 1986, an English version of the song was released under the name "Listen to Your Heart" to win non-French language markets. Three other versions were recorded thereafter: one more acoustic version on album Féminin singulière in 1995, another version with dance sonorities for European compilation Euro Pride 2000 and, more recently, a jazzy version as a bonus track on the album Autour de minuit in 2007.

== Critical reception ==
A review in Pan-European magazine Music & Media described "Ève lève-toi" as a song which has "Alphaville-like synthesisers" and a "sensual build-up to radio friendly pop tune". In addition, Pierre Sissman, Marketing Manager CBS France, said the song "has that typical Euro-feel that makes it extremely suitable for cross-over", and it was stated that the English version was well-received by CBS affiliates in Europe.

== Chart performance ==
In France, "Ève lève-toi" started at number 49 on 9 September 1986, then climbed every week and eventually reached number one in its 13th week, dislodging MC Miker G & DJ Sven's "Holiday Rap" atop, but immediately dropped to number two, being held off the number one position by Europe's "The Final Countdown". It remained on the chart for 27 weeks with 16 of them spent in the top ten, and was certified Gold disc by the Syndicat National de l'Édition Phonographique. On the Music & Media's Eurochart Hot 100, it debuted at number 69 on 20 September 1986, peaked at number 20 in its 13th week, and fell off the chart after 22 weeks.

== Cover versions ==
In 2002, the song was covered by French contestants of Star Academy 2 Emma Daumas and Anne-Laure Sibon for the album Star Academy fait sa boum. French singer Leslie also covered the song for her 2007 album 80 souvenirs.

== Track listings ==
These are the formats of track listings of the releases of "Ève lève-toi":

7" single - France

1. "Ève lève-toi" — 3:50
2. "L'homme qui aimait les femmes" — 4:10
- 7" single - Europe
1. "Listen to your heart" (English version of "Ève lève-toi") — 4:22
2. "Norma Jean" (English version of "L'homme qui aimait les femmes") — 4:03
- 12" maxi - France
1. "Ève lève-toi" (remix club) — 5:52
2. "Ève lève-toi" — 3:50
- 12" maxi - Europe
1. "Listen to Your Heart" (extended club remix) — 6:42
2. "Norma Jean" — 4:03

== Charts ==
Weekly chart performance for "Ève lève-toi"
Chart (1986)	Peak position
Europe (European Hot 100)	20
France (SNEP)	1
Quebec (ADISQ)	27

== Certifications and sales ==
Certifications for "Ève lève-toi"
Region	Certification	Certified units/sales
France (SNEP)	Gold	900,000

== See also ==
- List of number-one singles of 1986 (France)
