= Images (band) =

Images (French: [imaʒ]) was a French pop band that existed from 1986 to 1999 and then burst into the formation Émile et Images. The founders, Mario Ramsamy, Jean-Louis Pujade and Richard Seff; came from Toulouse, Occitania. Their biggest hit was "Les Démons de minuit" (1986), which was 13 weeks at number 1 on the charts in France."Les démons de minuit", is a very popular song, still to this day, in rock dancing; in French galas.

== Discography ==
=== Singles ===
- 1986 - Les Démons de minuit (#1 France, #31 Belgium (Flanders))
- 1986 - Love Emotion (English version of Les Démons de Minuit)
- 1987 - Corps à corps (#4 France)
- 1987 - Le coeur en exil (#6 France)
- 1988 - Maîtresse (#6 France)
- 1988 - Quand la musique tourne (#23 France)
- 1988 - L'enfant des rizières
- 1989 - Soleil
- 1990 - Danger d'amour
- 1990 - Nasty
- 1993 - Rendez-nous nos rêves
- 1993 - Sauvez l'amour (von Daniel Balavoine)
- 1995 - Megamix
- 1996 - Les démons de minuit
- 2000 - Mon ange

=== Albums ===
- 1987 - L'album d'Images
- 1990 - Le sens du rythme
- 1993 - Rendez-nous nos rêves
- 1994 - Collection légende
- 1995 - Le meilleur d'Images
- 1995 - Les inoubliables
- 1996 - The very best of
- 1997 - Soleil d'argile
- 2001 - Best of
