= Pochette Surprise (Surprise Package) =

Studio album by Jordy
- Released: 1992
- Recorded: 1992
- Genres: Dance music, children's music
- Label: Columbia

Jordy chronology
Pochette Surprise (Surprise Package) (1992)	Potion Magique (1994)

Singles from Pochette Surprise
- 1. "Dur dur d'être bébé!" Released: 1992; 2. "Alison (C'est ma copine à moi)" Released: 1993; 3. "Les Boules" Released: 1993

Professional ratings
Review scores
Source	Rating
AllMusic	4.5/5 stars

Pochette Surprise (Surprise Package) is the first album by singer Jordy. When it was released in France in 1992, he was only four years old. Its first single "Dur dur d'être bébé!" charted at #1 for 15 weeks, making Jordy the youngest recording artist to ever reach #1. It was followed by "Alison (C'est ma copine à moi)" which was also number one for five weeks, then by "Les Boules", which was much less successful (#13).

The album debuted at number seven on 9 December 1992 on the SNEP Albums Chart and had a peak at number two for three non consecutive weeks. It totaled 23 weeks in the top ten and 48 weeks in the top 50. In 1993, the album achieved 2 x Platinum status for over 600,000 copies sold. It also reached number ten on Finland.

== Track listing ==
1. "Dur dur d'être bébé!" [It's Tough to Be a Baby] (Clerget, Maratrat) — 3:24
2. "Alison" (Clerget, Lemoine, Maratrat ) — 3:41
3. "Ma Petite Soeur" [My Little Sister] (Lemoine, Maratrat) — 3:44
4. "Les Boules" [Losers] (Clerget, Lemoine, Maratrat ) — 3:52
5. "C'est pas nous" [That's Not for Us] (Lemoine, Maratrat) — 4:07
6. "La danse du pouce dans la bouche" [Thumb Sucking Dance] (Lemoine, Maratrat) — 3:33
7. "Jordy Rave Show" (Feys, Lemoine, Wybouw) — 4:01
8. "Dur dur d'être bébé!" (mix) (Clerget, Maratrat) — 5:22
9. "Les Boules (mix)" (Clerget, Lemoine, Maratrat ) — 5:04
10. "La danse du pouce dans la bouche" (remix) (Lemoine, Maratrat) — 7:23
11. "Dur dur d'être bébé!" (English version) (Clerget, Maratrat) — 3:16

== Personnel ==
- Jordy – vocals
- Didier Bader – engineer
- Guy Battarel – programming
- Raymond Taieb – producer
- Claude Lemoine – producer, art direction
- Michael "Clip" Payne - interpretation

== Charts ==
=== Weekly charts ===
Weekly chart performance for Pochette surprise
Chart (1993)	Peak position
European Albums (Music & Media)	18
Finnish Albums (Suomen virallinen lista)	10
French Albums (SNEP)	2
Greek Albums (IFPI)	5
