= The King Is Dead (Tony Cole song) =

1972 single by Tony Cole

Single by Tony Cole

from the album If The Music Stops
- B-side: "Ruby"
- Released: December 1972
- Recorded: 1972
- Genre: Folk rock
- Length: 2:52
- Label: 20th Century (US)
- Songwriters: Tony Cole (words and music)
- Producer: David McKay

Tony Cole singles chronology
"When We Get There" (1971)	"The King Is Dead" (1972)	"Suite: Man and Woman" (1972)

Alternative cover

Audio
- "The King Is Dead" on YouTube

"The King Is Dead" is a song written and originally recorded by Australian singer and songwriter Tony Cole. Produced by David McKay, it was part of Cole's debut album If The Music Stops (1972). That year the song was also released as a single that December, with "Ruby" on the flip side.

== Background and commercial performance ==
"The King Is Dead" was the second single released from Tony Cole's debut album If The Music Stops (1972). U.S. Billboard magazine picked the single for its "Radio Action and Pick Singles" section. The review was:

Second cut from his debut LP is a more driving, commercial rhythm ballad loaded with Top 40 potential.

Nevertheless, the song didn't chart either on U.S. Billboard's charts, or on the UK Singles Chart. It was re-released in 1977 in France to capitalize off of the success of the French version by Johnny Hallyday (titled "Gabrielle" after the first line of the song), however, this also failed to chart.

== Track listings ==
7" single 20th Century Records (1972, United States)

A. "The King Is Dead" (2:52)
B. "Ruby" (2:32)

7" single Jare International 410 067 EA (1977, France)

A. "The King Is Dead"
B. "Natural Dance"

== Johnny Hallyday version (in French) ==
"Gabrielle"

Single by Johnny Hallyday

from the album Derrière l'amour
- Language: French
- B-side: "Né pour vivre sans amour"
- Released: September 3, 1976
- Recorded: 1976
- Studio: Studio 92, Boulogne-Billancourt
- Genre: Soft rock, pop rock, chanson
- Length: 2:53
- Label: Philips
- Songwriters: French adaptation Long Chris, Patrick Larue
- Producer: Jacques Revaux

Johnny Hallyday singles chronology
"Derrière l'amour" (1976)	"Gabrielle" (1976)	"Le cœur en deux" (1977)

Music video
- "Gabrielle" (French TV, 1983) on YouTube

Several years later the song was adapted into French (under the title "Gabrielle") by Long Chris and Patrick Larue and recorded by Johnny Hallyday. His version was released as a single in 1976 and spent three consecutive weeks at the top of the singles sales chart in France (from 16 September to 6 October).

=== Charts ===
Chart (1976)	Peak position
France (singles sales)	1
Chart (2009)	Peak position
Belgium (Ultratop Back Catalog Singles Flanders)	20
