= Julie Pietri =

French pop singer (born 1955)

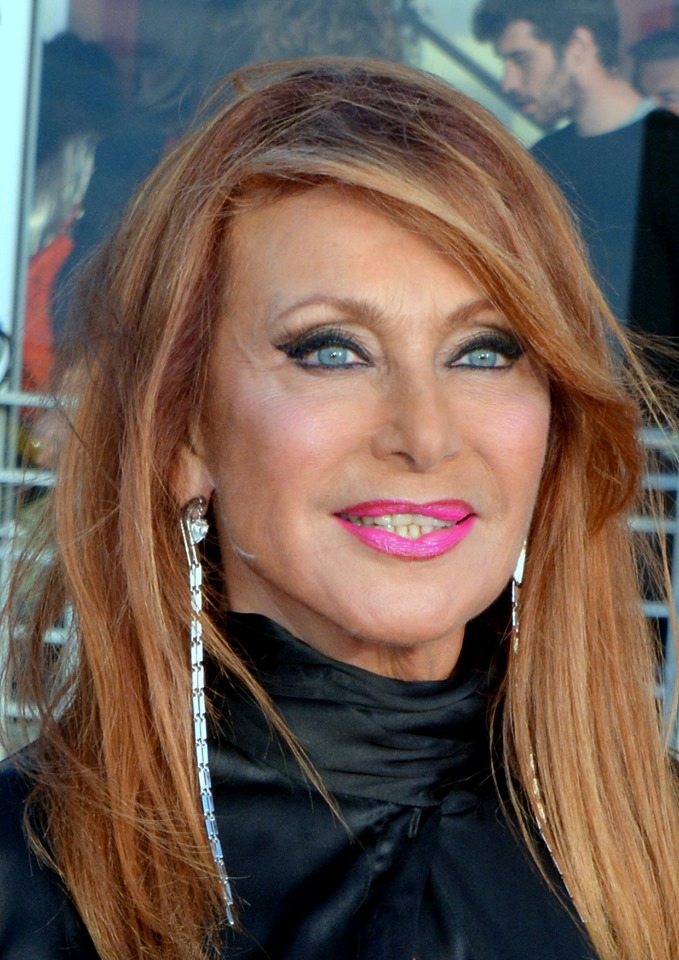
- Pietri in 2019

Background information
- Born: 1 May 1955 (age 71); Douera, Algeria
- Origin: Algiers, French Algeria
- Genres: Pop, jazz
- Occupation: Singer
- Years active: 1976–present
- Labels: Sony Music Entertainment; FGL Productions; G.L.A.M' Prod
- Website: julie-pietri.com

Julie Pietri (born 1 May 1955) is a French pop singer, best known for her single "Ève lève-toi", which was number-one on the French SNEP Singles Chart (Top 50) in November 1986 (also released in English, under the title "Listen to Your Heart").

== Early years ==
Pietri spent the first five years of her life in Algeria. In 1962, because of the independence gained by the country, her family was forced to exile in France. Thereafter, she decided to return to North Africa, in Casablanca. A few years later, she decided to live in Le Pecq, in Saint Germain en Laye suburb.

At the age of fourteen, Pietri formed a musical group named Transit, with whom she performed songs from artists including Véronique Sanson, Janis Joplin and Joe Cocker. In 1975, the band released its first single : "On s'est laissé faire".

== Beginnings ==
Then, after two years of studying speech therapy, she began working with La Bande à Basile, a music group dressed in costumes inspired by the Commedia dell'arte; she was dressed as a gypsy.

In late 1979, Julie was chosen to record the song "Magdalena". It was successful, allowing the singer to record her first studio album in 1980 with the contribution of French composer Jean Schultheis and lyricist Jean-Marie Moreau. In 1981, she went for the first time on stage of the Olympia with Sacha Distel. Seduced by her voice, he invited her to participate in his show and to sing with him two songs as duets.

In 1982, Pietri met success with "Je veux croire", a post-disco song with gospel sounds. She then enjoyed success with a French language version of The Kinks's hit "I go to sleep", retitled "Et c'est comme si".

The following year, Pietri duetteed with French singer Herbert Leonard on the song "Amoureux fous". Other singles followed including "Tora Tora Tora" and "À force de toi" (a cover of "I Should Have Known Better" performed by Jim Diamond) which supported the release of her new album in 1985, À force de toi. Meanwhile, she founded her own line of makeup. She was again invited to perform at the Olympia during a show by Belgian singer Frédéric François. She decided to take a break.

During this whole period, her stage name was simply Julie.

== Solo career ==
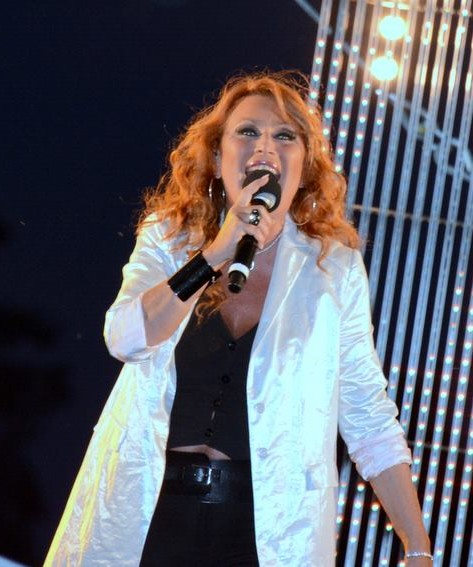
Pietri performing in 2013

In 1986, the singer returned to music using her complete name, Julie Pietri, and scored a French number one hit with "Ève lève-toi". She re-recorded the song in English as "Listen to your heart".

Le Premier Jour, her new album, was co-written by the singer. In December 1987, the song "Nuit sans issue" was released at the same time of the album release, composed by Vincent-Marie Bouvot. A few months later, she participated in a charity song with other artists for the boat people in Southeast Asia : "Dernier Matin d'Asie". In December, the singer gave a series of concerts at the Olympia, followed by a tour through France. She sang "Nouvelle Vie", the second hit off the album, and did a cover version of "Non, je ne regrette rien" by Édith Piaf and "La vie ne m'apprend rien by Daniel Balavoine.

In spring 1989, Pietri came back with a new look (blazing red hair) and told "La légende des madones" ("The Legend of madonnas") in a new album. Julie asked the singer-composer Daran to compose two of the eleven tracks of the album ("Feeling en noir" et "Joh-Daï"). The first single was "Salammbô", a song inspired by the female character created by Gustave Flaubert. In 1990, she released the third single from the album, "Étrangère", and started a concert tour in France during the summer. She also did softcore photos for French magazine Lui.

In March 1992, Julie Pietri gave birth to a daughter, Manon and decided to retire from music. The same year, a compilation and a double compilation were released.

== The transition ==
In 1995, the album Féminin singulière was released and contained new versions of Pietri's previous hits, arranged by Jean-Pierre Pilot, plus some new songs written by Julie Pietri and mainly composed by François Bernheim. She regularly performed in Paris at the Petit Journal Montparnasse, then at the Café Opus. In 1996, she recovered The Pretenders' hit but in French-language : "I'll Stand by You" was re-entitled "Je pense à nous". During the summer, she was requested by France 2 to record the ballad "Canto di Sorenza" with the Corsican polyphonic choir Voce di Corsica. She recorded this song for the credits of the TV movie Dans un grand vent de fleurs, aired in September and October.

In June 2000, she recorded a dance version of "Ève lève-toi" especially for the European compilation Euro Pride 2000. A Best Of compilation titled Ève lève-toi was released the same year. The singer returned to stage performance giving a concert at the Théâtre of Boulogne Billancourt in February 2001. She toured again during summers and appeared in many television shows. She recorded a new duet with Herbert Léonard, entitled "Orient Express".

== "Retour gagnant" ==
The TV broadcast "Retour gagnant", aired in May 2003, resurrected her career thanks to her successful cover of "Vivre pour le meilleur" (originally performed by the French singer Johnny Hallyday). In September, Pietri released an album called "Lumières", containing cover versions and original songs.

In March, Julie gives three concerts in the Duc des Lombards, a famous jazz club in Paris. The music style of her repertory is at that time turned into a jazzy mood.

In 2007 after, the DVD collection is completed by a CD + DVD bonus edit. In May and June, Julie Pietri records the songs of her new album called "Autour de minuit", the first single from which is a cover of the Etienne Daho song "Des Heures hindoues".

At the beginning of November, Pietri presented her jazzy song recital in Paris at the Scène Bastille and again then at the Bataclan. At the end of these concerts, a collector edit of her new album (limited to 1,000 copies) with a photo booklet was released.

== Discography ==
=== Albums ===
- 1980: Julie
- 1985: À force de toi
- 1987: Le premier jour
- 1989: La légende des madones – #39 in France
- 1995: Féminin singulière – #23 in France
- 2003: Lumières – #72 in France
- 2007: Julie Pietri à l'Olympia
- 2007: Autour de minuit

=== Compilations ===
- 1992: Collection or
- 1992: Double collection or
- 1995: Collection Gold (reedition Collection or)
- 2000: Ève lève-toi – #124 in France
- 2001: Les indispensables de Julie Pietri (reedition Collection or)
- 2015: Julie Pietri: L'essentiel

=== Singles ===
- 1979 : "Magdalena"
- 1980 : "Merci"
- 1980 : "J'me maquille blues"
- 1981 : "Let's Fall in Love"
- 1982 : "Je veux croire"
- 1982 : "Et c'est comme si"
- 1983 : "Amoureux fous" (duet with Herbert Léonard)
- 1984 : "Ma délivrance"
- 1984 : "Dernier appel"
- 1984 : "Tora tora tora"
- 1985 : "À force de toi"
- 1985 : "La chanson de la vie"
- 1986 : "Ève lève-toi" – #1 in France, Gold
- 1986 : "Listen to your heart"
- 1987 : "Nuit sans issue"
- 1987 : "Nouvelle vie" – #31 in France
- 1987 : "Dernier matin d'Asie"
- 1988 : "Immortelle"
- 1989 : "Salammbô"
- 1989 : "Priez pour elle"
- 1990 : "Étrangère"
- 1994 : "Devinez-moi"
- 1996 : "Je pense à nous"
- 1996 : "Dans un grand vent de fleurs" – #36 in France
- 2002 : "Orient Express" (duet with Herbert Léonard) – #88 in France
- 2004 : "Si on parlait de ma vie" – #43 in France
- 2007 : "Des heures hindoues"

=== Videos ===
- 1988 : Julie Pietri en concert (VHS Olympia 1987)
- 2006 : Julie Pietri à l'Olympia (DVD)
- 2007 : Julie Pietri à l'Olympia (CD + DVD bonus)
- 2008 : Julie Pietri & le Music Art Orchestra – Live au Bataclan
- 2009 : Autour de minuit – L'intégrale (CD/DVD – limited edition)
