= Herbert Léonard =

French singer (1945–2025)

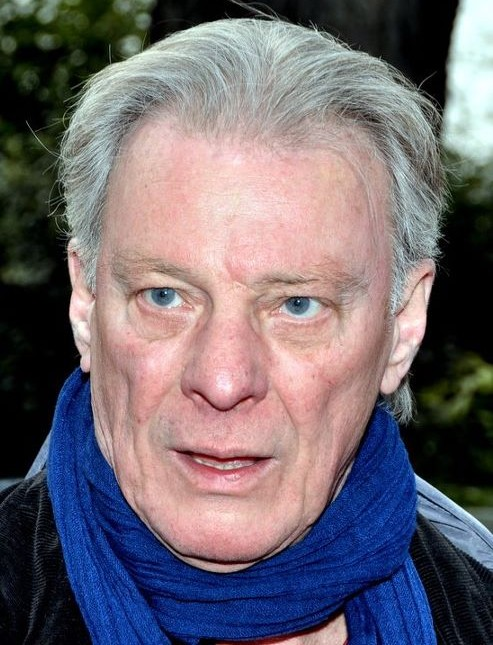
- Born: Hubert Lœnhard; 25 February 1945; Strasbourg, France
- Died: 2 March 2025 (aged 80); Fontainebleau, France
- Occupation: Singer
- Years active: 1966–2025
- Website: herbert-leonard.fr

Herbert Léonard (French pronunciation: [ɛʁbɛʁ leɔnaʁ]; 25 February 1945 – 2 March 2025), born Hubert Lœnhard, was a French entertainer and historian, who was principally known as a singer. He was also a specialist of Russian airplanes from World War II. His first success "Quelque chose tient mon cœur" (Somethings Got A Hold of My Heart) opened the doors of the hit-parade to him in 1968.

His 1982 album Ça donne envie d'aimer and the song "Amoureux fous" was done in a duo with Julie Pietri, perpetuating his image as a crooner. Léonard died from lung cancer in Fontainebleau on 2 March 2025, five days after his 80th birthday.

== Discography ==
- Si je ne t'aimais qu'un peu (1967)
- Quelque chose tient mon cœur (1968)
- Tel quel (1969)
- Trois pas dans le silence (1971)
- grands succès (1977)
- Pour le plaisir (1981)
- Ca donne envie d'aimer (1982)
- Commencez sans moi (1984)
- Mon cœur et ma maison (1985)
- Laissez-nous rêver (1987)
- Olympia (1988)
- Je suis un grand sentimental (1989)
- Herbert Léonard (1991)
- Une certaine idée de l'amour (1993)
- Notes intimes (1995)
- Le meilleur de Herbert Léonard (1998)
- Si j'avais un peu d'orgueil (1998)
- Ils s'aiment (2000)
- Génériquement vôtre (2001)
- Aimer une femme (2002)
- Entre charme et beauté (2004)
- Déclarations d'amour (2012)
- Mise à jour (50 ans de carrière) (2016)
