= Requiem pour un fou =

1976 single by Johnny Hallyday

Single by Johnny Hallyday

from the album Derrière l'amour
- Language: French
- English title: Requiem for a fool
- B-side: "Les Chiens de paille"
- Released: 10 February 1976
- Recorded: Late 1975–Early 1976
- Studio: Studio 92, Boulogne-Billancourt
- Genre: Chanson, French rock, requiem, blues rock
- Length: 4:47
- Label: Philips
- Composer: Gérard Layani
- Lyricist: Gilles Thibaut
- Producer: Jacques Revaux

Johnny Hallyday singles chronology
"La Terre promise" (1975)	"Requiem pour un fou" (1976)	"Derrière l'amour" (1976)

Music video
- "Requiem pour un fou" (Live, c. 1993) on YouTube

"Fool For Love (Requiem pour un fou)"

Single by Michael Bolton and Johnny Hallyday
- Language: French; English
- B-side: "Fool For Love (English)"
- Released: August 1996
- Genre: Rock
- Length: 4:47
- Label: Columbia
- Songwriters: Gérard Layani, Gilles Thibaut, Don Black
- Producer: Chris Kimsey

Michael Bolton singles chronology
"Love Is the Power" (1996)	"Fool For Love (Requiem pour un fou)" (1996)	"Go the Distance" (1997)

Johnny Hallyday singles chronology
"Hymne à l'amour (Live)" (1996)	"Fool For Love (Requiem pour un fou)" (1996)	"Tes tendres années (Live)" (1996)

"Requiem pour un fou"

Single by Johnny Hallyday and Lara Fabian

from the album Stade de France 98 Johnny allume le feu
- B-side: "Je veux te graver dans ma vie"
- Released: February 1999
- Recorded: 11 September 1998
- Venue: Stade de France
- Genre: Blues rock, orchestral
- Length: 4:01
- Label: Mercury France
- Songwriters: Gérard Layani, Gilles Thibaut
- Producer: Jacques Revaux

Johnny Hallyday singles chronology
"Seul" (1998)	"Requiem pour un fou" (1999)	"Vivre pour le meilleur" (1999)

Lara Fabian singles chronology
"La Différence" (1999)	"Requiem pour un fou" (1999)	"Adagio" (1999)

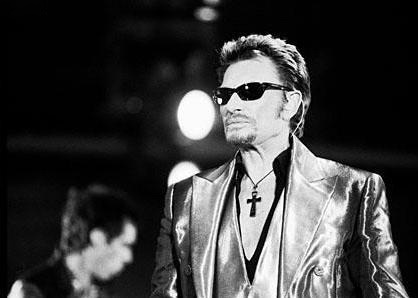
Johnny Hallyday in Villeneuve d'Ascq, 2003

"Requiem pour un fou" (French pronunciation: [ʁekɥijɛm puʁ ɛ̃ fu]) is a song by French singer Johnny Hallyday. It was released in February 1976 as the lead single off of his twenty-first studio album, "Derrière l'amour", released later that year in June. Hallyday has also re-recorded the song in Italian, Spanish, and English (with American singer Michael Bolton, English and Bilingual) and has also released duet versions with Bolton and Belgian-Italian singer Lara Fabian in 1996 and 1999 respectively, the latter duet being a live performance at the Stade de France in September 1998.

== History ==
Gilles Thibaut wrote the lyrics for this blues rock requiem on the theme of the love story, romantic drama and extreme tragedy of a “fanatic suicidal madman of love” who is abandoned by the woman he loves and, crazy for love and pain, kills her so as not to lose her; condemned to death for this feminicide, he in turn lets himself die out of love for her, “for a great love to always live it must die of love. About this socially very provocative and controversial title, which embodies the rocker soul of Johnny Hallyday, Jean-François Brieu considers that through its theme it is an “anti-Hallyday song par excellence” which had everything going for it. confuse the singer's audience, but who, through the grandiloquence of his interpretation, overcomes any reluctance and ultimately ignites the audience. This title is a variation of the song "Requiem pour un con" by Serge Gainsbourg, theme music for the film Le Pacha (1968) by Georges Lautner, with Jean Gabin.

== Commercial performance ==
The song spent four consecutive weeks at no. 1 on the singles sales chart in France (from 4 to 31 March 1976).

== Charts ==
=== Original ===
Chart (1976)	Peak position
France (singles sales)	1
Chart (2009)	Peak position
Belgium (Ultratop Back Catalogue Singles)	16

=== Lara Fabian duet version ===
Chart (1999)	Peak position
Belgium (Ultratop 50 Wallonia)	11
France (SNEP)	8
Switzerland (Schweizer Hitparade)	5
