= Jordy (French singer) =

French singer (born 1988)

- Born: Jordy Claude Daniel Lemoine; 14 January 1988 (age 38)
- Origin: Saint-Germain-en-Laye, Yvelines, Île-de-France, France
- Genres: Pop, dance
- Occupations: Singer, musician
- Instrument: Guitar
- Years active: 1992–1996, 2006–2008
- Label: Columbia

Jordy Claude Daniel Lemoine (born 14 January 1988), known as Jordy, is a French singer and musician. He was known for his hit single "Dur dur d'être bébé!" when he was four years old.

He was born in Saint-Germain-en-Laye, Yvelines. He is the son of music producer Claude Lemoine, who was involved with the Rockets from 1976 to 1992.

== Career ==
Jordy is listed in the Guinness Book of World Records as the youngest singer ever to have a No. 1 charted single. He achieved this in 1992, at the age of four-and-a-half, with the song "Dur dur d'être bébé!" ("It's Tough to Be a Baby").

"Dur dur d'être bébé!" was No. 1 for 15 weeks in France, and was a dance hit across Europe, Brazil, Latin America, South Korea, and Japan. It landed at No. 58 on the Billboard Hot 100, making him the youngest artist to ever chart there.

As a teenager, Jordy appeared on Season 2 of the French television show La Ferme Célébrités on 30 April 2005, making his first public appearance in almost ten years. He was named winner on 28 June 2005.

On 28 February 2006, he released his first new single in 12 years, "Je t'apprendrai", and began performing with his band Jordy & the Dixies.

== Discography ==
=== Albums ===
- Pochette Surprise (1992)
- Potion Magique (1993)
- Récréation (1995)

=== Singles ===
Year	Song	Peak chart positions														Album
Year	Song	France	Spain	Finland	Austria	Belgium	Neth	Norway	NZ	Sweden	Switz	Australia	UK	US Hot 100	US Latin	Album
1992	"Dur dur d'être bébé!"	1	1	2	3	3	3	5	11	14	20	37	92	58	11	Pochette Surprise
1993	"Alison"	1	—	22	—	—	—	—	—	—	—	—	—	—	—	Pochette Surprise
1993	"Les Boules"	13	—	—	—	—	—	—	—	—	—	—	—	—	—	Pochette Surprise
1993	"It's Christmas, C'est Noël"	18	—	—	—	—	—	—	—	—	—	151	—	—	—	Potion Magique
1994	"Love Love Dance"	—	—	—	—	—	—	—	—	—	—	—	—	—	—	Potion Magique
1994	"Petit Papa Noël"	—	—	—	—	—	—	—	—	—	—	—	—	—	—	Potion Magique
1995	"Coolman"	—	—	—	—	—	—	—	—	—	—	—	—	—	—	Récréation
2006	"Je t'apprendrai"	45	—	—	—	—	—	—	—	—	—	—	—	—	—	(single only)
