= Tony Cole (musician) =

Australian musician and schoolteacher

- Birth name: Branko Bernard Miler
- Origin: Sydney, New South Wales, Australia
- Died: 2001
- Labels: Pakktel

Branko Bernard Miler (died 2001), better known by his stage name Tony Cole, was an Australian singer and songwriter.

He made his recording debut backed by the Crestaires on the Pakktel label in 1965 with the single, "Boomerang Baby". He moved to the United Kingdom in the early 1970s. He co-wrote, "Beg, Steal or Borrow", which was performed by the New Seekers as the United Kingdom's entry into the Eurovision Song Contest 1972, where it finished second. He was a songwriter on Cliff Richard's film, Take Me High (1973). One of his singles, "The King Is Dead" (1972), was adapted into French and released as "Gabrielle" (1976) by Johnny Hallyday where it reached No. 1.

== Biography ==
Tony Cole was a school teacher when he performed on TV pop music show, Bandstand, in 1964. In the following year he appeared on a briefly existing show, Boomeride, it was "a musical variety show that showcased young Australian talent". Cole released a single, "Boomerang Baby", which also appeared on a various artists soundtrack album, Boomeride: Songs from the TV series (1965). Under the name, Branko Miler, he released a single, "Candy", in 1969.

Cole relocated to the United Kingdom in the early 1970s, where he released his debut album, If the Music Stops (1972), which provided two singles. The first, "Suite: Man and Woman" b/w "All I Meant to Do", peaked at No. 97 on the Billboard Hot 100. The second one, "The King Is Dead", was written by Cole under the name, Branko Bernard Miler. It gained interest in the United States, where Billboard's reviewer chose it for their "Radio Action and Pick Singles" section but it did not chart.

Cole co-wrote, "Beg, Steal or Borrow", with Graeme Hall and Steve Wolfe. It was performed by the New Seekers for the Eurovision Song Contest 1972, and they finished second. When issued as a single in March 1972, it peaked at No. 1 in Norway, No. 2 in United Kingdom, and No. 5 in Germany He had a minor Australian hit with his solo single, "The Hook" (1973).

He wrote music for the soundtrack of Take Me High (1973), a film starring Cliff Richard. Dave Thompson of AllMusic described the related album, "Little about [it] appealed, from its tawdry cover art on to the soulless succession of lightweight [Cole] ballads that were the heart of the soundtrack." Ahead of the film's Australian release, in June 1974, The Australian Women's Weekly's reviewer observed, "[it] has lots of good [Cole] music (including the title song), but done in a different way and with no choreographed numbers."

In 1976 his track, "The King Is Dead", was adapted into French as the single, "Gabrielle", for Johnny Hallyday, which reached No. 1. It peaked at No. 20 in Belgium. It returned to the French singles chart in December 2017, where it reached No. 13.

== Discography ==
=== Albums ===
- If the Music Stops (1972)
- Magnificently Mad (1973)

=== Singles ===
- "Boomerang Baby" (1965)
- "The King Is Dead" (1972)
- "The Hook" (1973) (AUS #60)
