= Vendeurs de larmes =

1982 album by Daniel Balavoine

Studio album by Daniel Balavoine
- Released: April 1982
- Recorded: December 1981
- Studio: Ibiza, Spain
- Genre: Pop rock
- Length: 46:59
- Label: Riviera-LM; Barclay
- Producer: Andy Scott; Daniel Balavoine

Daniel Balavoine chronology
Balavoine sur scène (1981)	Vendeurs de larmes (1982)	Loin des yeux de l'Occident (1983)

Singles from Vendeurs de larmes
- 1. "Vivre ou survivre" Released: April 1982; 2. "Vendeurs de larmes" Released: August 1982; 3. "Soulève-moi" Released: 1982

Vendeurs de larmes is the sixth studio album by French singer Daniel Balavoine, that was released in April 1982 and was a success with sales of over 600 thousand copies in France. It was also a new revival of French pop rock, and the single "Vivre ou survivre" from the album proved to be one of the greatest hits for Balavoine.

== Background and release ==
The album was a turning point for Balavoine as it saw a departure of his backing band Clin d’Œil who had accompanied Balavoine since his 1977 album Les aventures de Simon et Gunther.... On Vendeurs de larmes, only keyboardist Hervé Limeretz and drummer/keyboardist Jean-Paul Batailley remained among the musicians. The album was recorded in Ibiza, which was also a big change for Balavoine, having previously only recorded in studios around Paris.

The album was released in April 1982 and sold over 600 thousand copies, becoming Balavoine third best-selling album after Le chanteur and Sauver l'amour. The first single was "Vivre ou survivre", also released in April 1982. It became a top-ten hit and sold over 300 thousand copies. The second single released was the title track "Vendeurs de larmes" and also achieved success selling over 80 thousand copies.

In 1982, the album also won the "Prix Diamant de la chanson française" award.

== Track listing ==
All tracks are written by Daniel Balavoine, except where noted.

No.	Title	Writer(s)	Length
1.	"Pour faire un disque"		1:23
2.	"Vivre ou survivre"		3:33
3.	"Je veux de l'or"		3:42
4.	"Dieu que l'amour est triste"		4:02
5.	"C'est fini"		4:08
6.	"Soulève-moi"		3:33
7.	"L'amour gardé secret"		4:05
8.	"La fillette de l'étang"		3:20
9.	"Y a pas de bon numéro"	Daniel Balavoine, Patrick Dulphy	2:50
10.	"Vendeurs de larmes"		4:40
11.	"Viens danser"		3:37
12.	"La danse"	Daniel Balavoine, Philippe Patron	4:05
13.	"Au revoir"		4:01
Total length:			46:59

== Personnel ==
- Daniel Balavoine – vocals, guitar, keyboards
- Christian Padovan – bass
- Hervé Limeretz – keyboards
- Philippe Patron – keyboards
- Yves Chouard – guitar
- Joe Hammer – drums, backing vocals
- Jean-Paul Batailley – percussion
