= Face amour / Face amère =

1979 album by Daniel Balavoine

Studio album by Daniel Balavoine
- Released: October 1979
- Recorded: June 1979
- Studio: Studio Damiens, Boulogne-Billancourt
- Genre: Pop; rock
- Length: 33:59
- Label: Riviera-LM; Barclay
- Producer: Andy Scott; Daniel Balavoine

Daniel Balavoine chronology
Le chanteur (1978)	Face amour / Face amère (1979)	Un autre monde (1980)

Singles from Face amour / Face amère
- 1. "Me laisse pas m'en aller" Released: September 1979; 2. "Dancing samedi" Released: January 1980; 3. "Tu me plais beaucoup" Released: February 1980

Face amour / Face amère is the fourth album by French singer Daniel Balavoine, released in October 1979. The album was credited with Balavoine's backing group Clin d'Œil who had accompanied him since his second album Les aventures de Simon et Gunther....

== Release ==
Face amour / Face amère was released as the follow up to Balavoine's breakthrough album Le chanteur, which went on to sell over 800 thousand copies. However, the album did not achieve the same success as Le chanteur, only selling 130 thousand copies. Only released a year after Le chanteur, Face amour / Face amère suffered from the success of it predecessor whose sales at the time were still significant. Despite this, the album was praised by critics.

Three singles were released from the album. The first, "Me laisse pas m'en aller" was released in September 1979 and like the album, was moderately successful, selling 80 thousand copies. The second, "Dancing samedi", was released in early 1980, failing to find much success, and the final single, "Tu me plais beaucoup", was released shortly afterwards.

On the album, the song "Pauvre Bobby" is sung by Clin d'Œil drummer Roger Secco, though Balavoine does sing backing vocals along with the rest of the group.

== Track listing ==
All tracks are written by Daniel Balavoine, except where noted.

Face amour
No.	Title	Writer(s)	Length
1.	"Face amour / Face amère"		2:06
2.	"Toi et moi"	Daniel Balavoine, Patrick Dulphy	2:48
3.	"Me laisse pas m'en aller"		3:30
4.	"Love Linda"		3:48
5.	"Tu me plais beaucoup"		3:45

Face amère
No.	Title	Writer(s)	Length
6.	"Ces petits riens"		3:26
7.	"Dancing samedi"		3:19
8.	"Pauvre Bobby" (sung by Roger Secco)	Daniel Balavoine, Patrick Dulphy, Roger Secco	3:17
9.	"Drôle de galaxie"	Daniel Balavoine, Bernard Balavoine	3:05
10.	"Rougeagèvre"		5:01
Total length:			33:59

== Personnel ==
- Daniel Balavoine – vocals
- Bernard Serré – bass guitar, synthesiser, backing vocals
- Patrick Dulphy – acoustic guitar
- Colin Swinburne – electric guitar
- Jean-Paul Batailley – drums, percussion (tracks 1 and 5)
- Roger Secco – drums, backing vocals
- Hervé Limeretz – keyboards
- Patrick Bourgoin – horns
- Guy Balavoine – backing vocals
