= Je ne suis pas un héros =

1980 song by Johnny Hallyday

Song by Johnny Hallyday

from the album À partir de maintenant
- Language: French
- English title: I am not a hero
- Released: 25 June 1980
- Recorded: February 1980
- Genre: Pop rock
- Length: 4:10
- Label: Philips
- Songwriter: Daniel Balavoine
- Producer: Eddie Vartan

Audio
- "Je ne suis pas un héros" on YouTube

"Je ne suis pas un héros"

Single by Daniel Balavoine

from the album Un autre monde
- A-side: "Lipstick polychrome"
- Released: May 1981
- Recorded: August 1980
- Studio: Studio Damiens, Boulogne-Billancourt
- Genre: Pop rock
- Length: 5:10
- Label: Riviera-LM; Barclay
- Songwriter: Daniel Balavoine
- Producer: Andy Scott

Daniel Balavoine singles chronology
| "Mon fils ma bataille" (1980) | "Je ne suis pas un héros" (1981) | "La vie ne m'apprend rien" (1981) |

Music video
- "Je ne suis pas un héros" (French TV, 1981) on YouTube

"Je ne suis pas un héros" ("I am not a hero") is a song by French singer Johnny Hallyday, released on his 1980 album À partir de maintenant. It was written by fellow singer Daniel Balavoine who went on to also record and release his own version.

== Background and release ==
By 1980, Balavoine had become a recognised singer thanks to the success of the rock opera Starmania as well as his 1978 album Le chanteur. However, he became further known in March 1980, when he clashed with François Mitterrand, the First Secretary of the Socialist Party, and who a year later would become the President of France, live on the national television news programme Antenne 2 Midi. At the time there was rising unemployment, totalling 1.5 million, and a feeling that the political leaders had more interest in party politics than the concerns of the French public, in particular that of the youth. So, faced opposite Mitterrand, Balavoine confronted him, accusing him of ignoring the problems facing the French youth.

Johnny Hallyday met Balavoine in 1980. The two got on well, and after several encounters, Balavoine had the idea to write a song for Hallyday. Inspired by Hallyday's life, "Je ne suis pas un héros" depicts the life of a once famous idol, damaged by a life of torment and fame. Hallyday recorded the song in February 1980 during the sessions for his twenty-sixth album À partir de maintenant, which was released in June that year. "Je ne suis pas un héros" was not considered as a single, to the disappointment of Balavoine who believed that it had the potential to be Hallyday's number-one song that year.

Balavoine decided to record his own version of the song in August 1980 for his album Un autre monde, released in November, and dedicated his version to Hallyday. It was also released as the B-side to his single "Lipstick polychrome" in France, and as an A-side single in Canada.

== 1990 version ==
"Je ne suis pas un héros"

Single by Johnny Hallyday

from the album Dans la chaleur de Bercy
- B-side: "Mystery Train"
- Released: 26 November 1990
- Recorded: 1990
- Venue: Palais Omnisports de Paris-Bercy, Paris
- Genre: Pop rock
- Length: 4:14
- Label: Philips
- Songwriter: Daniel Balavoine
- Producer: Jean-Pierre Janiaud

Johnny Hallyday singles chronology
| "Cadillac" (1990) | "Je ne suis pas un héros" (1990) | "Diego libre dans sa tête" (1991) |

Music video
- "Je ne suis pas un héros" (Live at Bercy, 1991) on YouTube

Balavoine and Hallyday remained close; however, in 1986, Balavoine died in a helicopter accident during the Paris–Dakar Rally. In tribute, Hallyday sang the song for the first time on stage in 1990 at the Paris-Bercy. This live version was then released as a single in November 1990 from Hallyday's album Dans la chaleur de Bercy. However, the single was released during the middle of the Gulf War, and some saw it as an allusion and a provocation, with several radio stations forbidding it from being played.

The single still reached the top 20, peaking at number 18 on the French singles chart in March 1991. It sold over 40 thousand copies.

=== Track listing ===
7": Philips / 8787067

1. "Je ne suis pas un héros" – 4:14
2. "Mystery Train" – 3:02

CD: Philips / 8787067-2

1. "Je ne suis pas un héros" – 4:14
2. "Mystery Train" – 3:02
3. "Honky Tonk Women" – 4:24

=== Charts ===
| Chart (1991) | Peak position |
|---|---|
| France (SNEP) | 18 |

== Other notable versions ==
- In 2005, in the fifth series of the French reality television singing competition Star Academy, the contestants performed a version of "Je ne suis pas un héros". It was released as a single and peaked at number two in France, number twenty in Switzerland and topped the Belgian Walloon chart.
