= List of number-one singles of 1971 (France) =

This is a list of the French Singles & Airplay Chart Reviews number-ones of 1971.

== Summary ==
=== Singles Chart ===
Week	Issue Date	Artist	Single
1	7 January	Michel Sardou	"J'habite en France"
2	14 January	George Harrison	"My Sweet Lord"
3	21 January	George Harrison	"My Sweet Lord"
4	28 January	George Harrison	"My Sweet Lord"
5	4 February	George Harrison	"My Sweet Lord"
6	11 February	George Harrison	"My Sweet Lord"
7	18 February	George Harrison	"My Sweet Lord"
8	25 February	George Harrison	"My Sweet Lord"
9	4 March	George Harrison	"My Sweet Lord"
10	11 March	George Harrison	"My Sweet Lord"
11	18 March	Les Poppys	"Non, non rien n'a changé"
12	25 March	Les Poppys	"Non je ne veux pas faire la guerre"
13	1 April	Tom Jones	"She's a Lady"
14	8 April	Tom Jones	"She's a Lady"
15	15 April	Les Poppys	"Non, non rien n'a changé"
16	22 April	Les Poppys	"Non, non rien n'a changé"
17	29 April	Les Poppys	"Non, non rien n'a changé"
18	6 May	Sheila	"Les rois mages"
19	13 May	Sheila	"Les rois mages"
20	20 May	Sheila	"Les rois mages"
21	27 May	Sheila	"Les rois mages"
22	3 June	Michel Delpech	"Pour un flirt"
23	10 June	Joan Baez	"Here's to You"
24	17 June	Joan Baez	"Here's to You"
25	24 June	Joan Baez	"Here's to You"
26	1 July	Joan Baez	"Here's to You"
27	8 July	Michel Delpech	"Pour un flirt"
28	15 July	Michel Delpech	"Pour un flirt"
29	22 July	Michel Delpech	"Pour un flirt"
30	29 July	Michel Delpech	"Pour un flirt"
31	5 August	Michel Delpech	"Pour un flirt"
32	12 August	Michel Delpech	"Pour un flirt"
33	19 August	Michel Delpech	"Pour un flirt"
34	26 August	Michel Delpech	"Pour un flirt"
35	2 September	Gilbert Montagné	"The Fool"
36	9 September	Esther Galil	"Le jour se lève"
37	16 September	Esther Galil	"Le jour se lève"
38	23 September	Esther Galil	"Le jour se lève"
39	30 September	Esther Galil	"Le jour se lève"
40	7 October	Pop-Tops	"Mamy Blue"
41	14 October	Nicoletta	"Mamy Blue"
42	21 October	Nicoletta	"Mamy Blue"
43	28 October	Pop-Tops	"Mamy Blue"
44	4 November	Pop-Tops	"Mamy Blue"
45	11 November	Pop-Tops	"Mamy Blue"
46	18 November	Michel Sardou	"Le rire du sergent"
47	25 November	Michel Sardou	"Le rire du sergent"
48	2 December	Michel Sardou	"Le rire du sergent"
49	9 December	Michel Sardou	"Le rire du sergent"
50	16 December	Michel Sardou	"Le rire du sergent"
51	23 December	Michel Sardou	"Le rire du sergent"
52	30 December	Pop Concerto Orchestra	"Pop Concerto"

== See also ==
- 1971 in music
- List of number-one hits (France)
