= Le chanteur =

1978 album by Daniel Balavoine

Studio album by Daniel Balavoine
- Released: June 1978
- Recorded: April 1978
- Studio: Studio Damiens, Boulogne-Billancourt
- Genre: Pop rock
- Length: 39:23
- Label: Riviera-LM; Barclay
- Producer: Andy Scott

Daniel Balavoine chronology
Les aventures de Simon et Gunther... (1977)	Le chanteur (1978)	Face amour / Face amère (1979)

Singles from Le chanteur
- 1. "Le chanteur" Released: June 1978; 2. "Lucie" Released: 1979

Le chanteur is the third album by French singer Daniel Balavoine, released in June 1978 under Riviera-LM, a subsidiary of Barclay. The album was commercially successful, selling over 800 thousand copies.

== Background and recording ==
Prior to Le chanteur, Balavoine had released two albums, De vous à elle en passant par moi and Les aventures de Simon et Gunther..., both of which had sold very poorly. Barclay founder Eddie Barclay expressed concerns over the future success of Balavoine; however, Léo Missir, the artistic director at Barclay, defended Balavoine and kept him at the label. Balavoine also decided that if he sold fewer than 30 thousand copies of his next album and fewer than 100 thousand copies of his next single, he would quit music.

Thanks to Missir, Balavoine returned to the studio in April 1978 to record his third album. However, after several weeks, Missir visited the studio to listen to what had been produced, but found that a sufficiently strong enough song to mark the album was missing. Later, whilst playing a melody, which would become "Le chanteur", in the studio, one of the musicians played a harmony on the keyboard which was then recorded by mistake. These notes then inspired Balavoine to rewrite the introduction, giving the song its distinctive opening. Subsequently, one time whilst the rest of the musicians were at a restaurant next door to the studio, Balavoine stayed behind and wrote the lyrics to "Le chanteur" in an hour. The lyrics recount the life and career of a fictional singer and the song was initially titled "J'voudrais bien réussir ma vie", in reference to the song "Je m'voyais déjà" by Charles Aznavour, but was later changed to "Le chanteur".

== Release ==
Le chanteur was released at the beginning of June 1978. For the release of the album's first single, Barclay's sales team produced a promotional single with "Le chanteur" as the B-side and "Si je suis fou" as the A-side with the record company seeing "Si je suis fou" as being the more potentially successful. However, when the radio stations played "Le chanteur", the record company were surprised and were forced to place it as the A-side for the commercial release of the single.

Whilst both the album and the first single were released in June 1978, neither garnered success until after the release of album Starmania in September 1978, a cast recording for the rock opera of the same name in which Balavoine stars and sings. This album was hugely successful and went on to be certified diamond by the SNEP.

The second single from Le chanteur was "Lucie" and was released in 1979. It featured the song "SOS d'un terrien en détresse" from Starmania as the B-side.

== Track listing ==
All tracks are written by Daniel Balavoine, except where noted.

Side one
No.	Title	Writer(s)	Length
1.	"Les oiseaux (1ère partie)"		3:48
2.	"Les oiseaux (2ème partie)"	Daniel Balavoine, Patrick Dulphy	3:26
3.	"France"	Daniel Balavoine, Bernard Serré	3:20
4.	"C'est un voyou"		3:02
5.	"Lucie"		5:18

Side two
No.	Title	Writer(s)	Length
6.	"Le chanteur"		3:51
7.	"Si je suis fou"		3:26
8.	"Oiseau de nuit"		4:44
9.	"Le pied par terre"	Daniel Balavoine, Patrick Dulphy	3:44
10.	"Des gens comme vous"	Daniel Balavoine, Bernard Balavoine	4:44
Total length:			39:23

== Personnel ==
- Daniel Balavoine – vocals, acoustic guitar, keyboards
- Bernard Serré – bass, backing vocals
- Patrick Dulphy – guitar
- Colin Swinburne – guitar
- Jean-Paul Batailley – drums, percussion
- Roger Secco – drums, backing vocals
- Hervé Limeretz – keyboard
- Patrick Bourgoin – wind instruments
- Guy Balavoine – backing vocals

== Charts ==
Chart (1978)	Peak position
French Albums (IFOP)	5

== Certifications ==
Region	Certification	Certified units/sales
France (SNEP)	Gold	100,000^{*}
^{*} Sales figures based on certification alone.
