= Loin des yeux de l'Occident =

1983 album by Daniel Balavoine

Studio album by Daniel Balavoine
- Released: October 1983
- Recorded: June 1983
- Studio: Strawberry Studios, Dorking; Highland Studios, Inverness
- Genre: Synth-pop; pop rock; world music
- Length: 41:10
- Label: Riviera-LM; Barclay
- Producer: Andy Scott; Daniel Balavoine

Daniel Balavoine chronology
Vendeurs de larmes (1982)	Loin des yeux de l'Occident (1983)	Balavoine au Palais des sports (1984)

Singles from Loin des yeux de l'Occident
- 1. "Pour la femme veuve qui s'éveille" Released: October 1983; 2. "Les petits lolos" Released: February 1984; 3. "Frappe avec ta tête" Released: 1989

Loin des yeux de l'Occident is the seventh studio album by French singer Daniel Balavoine, released in October 1983.

== Background and release ==
The album was another change in style for Balavoine, with the notable presence of synthesisers and programming. After listening to Peter Gabriel's latest album, he bought the revolutionary synthesiser Fairlight CMI and became one of the first French musicians to experiment with it. At his home in Colombes, he built a home studio, comprising the Fairlight as well as two other synthesisers, an Oberheim and a PPG Wave 2. He then spent several months experimenting with this technology before being ready to record the album.

Balavoine chose to record at Strawberry Studios in Dorking due to its reputation and technical capabilities. He also moved recording to Highland Studios in Inverness for a change of scenery and due to its peacefulness.

Balavoine also took inspiration, both musically and in the lyrics, from Africa. In 1983, he was invited to participate in the Paris-Dakar Rally as a co-driver. However, after breaking down in the first stage, he followed the rally in a caravan. This consequently opened his eyes to life in Africa, as he saw the poverty and famine there. Again, also inspired by the world music albums by Peter Gabriel, Balavoine made use of African percussion on the album.

The album covers a range of different topics, which Balavoine described as being a succession of ideas, meaning that there isn't a unifying theme or concept to the album. The only link on the album is that Balavoine wrote the lyrics to one song per day according to a strict schedule so he did not spend hours trying to perfect each song.

The first single released from the album was "Pour la femme veuve qui s'éveille", released in October 1983. The song criticises the living conditions of women (the song refers to widowed women) caused by war and policies and how they have to continue on and be the pillars of their families. First of all, he makes reference to a woman in China having to work to feed her sons, implicitly criticising the one-child policy that had been introduced there in 1970. The song then goes on to reference the labour camps in the USSR and then the Maasai people in Africa.

"Les petits lolos" was released as the second single in February 1984 and describes a man's attraction to teenage girls, similar to Vladimir Nabokov's Lolita.

Elsewhere on the album, "Supporter" looks at friendship and affection through the theme of football, and "Poisson dans la cage" looks at the effects of a drug overdose. "Partir avant les miens" looks at his death and burial before those close to him so he doesn't have to deal with the pain of losing them. This is prophetic given that less than three years later, Balavoine died in a helicopter accident. Two songs look at torture in South America: the first, "Frappe avec ta tête" was dedicated to pianist Miguel Ángel Estrella and tells the story of a writer who, after having his fingers cut off and his tongue cut out, the only way to express himself is to hit with his head. The second, "Revolución" describes the Mothers of Plaza de Mayo in Argentina who demonstrated against the disappearance of their children and those close to them during the country's military dictatorship, National Reorganization Process.

Loin des yeux de l'Occident was re-released in 1989, and along with it a remixed version of "Frappe avec ta tête" was released as a single.

== Track listing ==
All tracks are written by Daniel Balavoine.

Side one
No.	Title	Length
1.	"Pour la femme veuve qui s'éveille"	5:28
2.	"Supporter"	4:15
3.	"Les petits lolos"	4:00
4.	"Frappe avec ta tête"	5:00

Side two
No.	Title	Length
5.	"Vidéo "série noire""	3:58
6.	"Partir avant les miens"	5:07
7.	"Poisson dans la cage"	4:00
8.	"Élu par les bœufs"	3:57
9.	"Revolución"	5:25
Total length:		41:10

== Personnel ==
Musicians

- Daniel Balavoine – vocals, backing vocals (1, 3, 5–9), keyboards (4, 8), piano (4, 8)
- Alain Pewzner – guitar, backing vocals (1, 3, 5–9)
- Yves Chouard – guitar, backing vocals (4, 9)
- Christian Padovan – bass, backing vocals (1, 3, 5–9)
- Patrick Moraz – keyboards (6)
- Philippe Patron – keyboards, backing vocals (1)
- Jean-Hervé Limeretz – keyboards
- Joe Hammer – drums, percussion, backing vocals (1, 3, 5–9)
- Jean-Paul Batailley – percussion
- Ron Aspery – saxophone

Technical

- Daniel Balavoine – producer, artwork
- Andy Scott – producer, engineer
- Ben Kape – engineer
- Léo Missir – executive producer, supervisor
- Jean-Paul Théodule – artwork
- Gérard Rancinan – photography
- Patrick Cosse – photography
- Richard Schroeder – photography
- Sygma – photography
