= Un autre monde (Daniel Balavoine album) =

1980 album by Daniel Balavoine

Studio album by Daniel Balavoine
- Released: November 1980
- Recorded: August 1980
- Studio: Studio Damiens, Boulogne-Billancourt
- Genre: Pop rock
- Length: 42:21
- Label: Riviera-LM; Barclay
- Producer: Andy Scott; Daniel Balavoine

Daniel Balavoine chronology
Face amour / Face amère (1979)	Un autre monde (1980)	Balavoine sur scène (1981)

Singles from Un autre monde
- 1. "Mon fils ma bataille" Released: November 1980; 2. "Lipstick polychrome" Released: May 1981; 3. "Je ne suis pas un héros" Released: 1982

Un autre monde is the fifth album by French singer Daniel Balavoine, released in November 1980. It was commercially successful, selling over 500 thousand copies.

== Release ==
The album was released in November 1980 and spawned three singles. The first, "Mon fils ma bataille", was hugely successful, going on to sell over 500 thousand copies. The song addresses the topic of divorce, in particular that of a father's struggle to maintain custody of his child. It was inspired by the divorce of guitarist Colin Swinburne's parents, as well as by the film Kramer vs. Kramer released earlier in 1980 that deals with the same subject. The second single, "Lipstick polychrome", was released in May 1981 and uses the representation of lipstick in a humorous and metaphorical way saying that lipstick is for everyone, both men and women. The song ends with translations sung in English, Spanish, German, Italian, Tahitian, Polish and Finnish. The final single, "Je ne suis pas un héros", was only released in Canada in 1982.

The cover of the album depicts a black and white photo of Balavoine holding a camera. In the lens of the camera, there are pictures of Chinese soldiers wearing Maoist hats. The red lettering on the album cover also evokes China, and in the title track there are samples of speeches by Mao Zedong.

== Track listing ==
All tracks are written by Daniel Balavoine, except where noted.

Side one
No.	Title	Length
1.	"Mon fils ma bataille"	4:07
2.	"10 000 mètres"	4:15
3.	"Bateau toujours" (with Michel Berger)	2:37
4.	"Lipstick polychrome"	4:20
5.	"Je ne suis pas un héros"	5:10

Side two
No.	Title	Writer(s)	Length
6.	"Détournement"		5:07
7.	"La vie ne m'apprend rien"		4:15
8.	"Allez hop !"		3:46
9.	"Mort d'un robot"	Daniel Balavoine, Patrick Dulphy	3:29
10.	"Un autre monde"		5:15
Total length:			42:21

== Personnel ==
- Daniel Balavoine – vocals
- Robert Serré – bass guitar, backing vocals
- Patrick Dulphy – guitar
- Colin Swinburne – guitar
- Jean-Paul Batailley – percussion
- Roger Secco – drums, backing vocals
- Jean-Hervé Limeretz – keyboards
- Patrick Bourgoin – brass instruments
- Kako Bessot – brass instruments
- Tony Brenes – brass instruments
- Christian Guizien – trombone
- Guy Balavoine – backing vocals
