= Sauver l'amour (album) =

1985 album by Daniel Balavoine

Studio album by Daniel Balavoine
- Released: 18 October 1985
- Recorded: July 1985
- Studio: Highland Studios, Inverness
- Genre: Synth-pop; pop rock
- Length: 41:18
- Label: Barclay
- Producer: Andy Scott

Daniel Balavoine chronology
Balavoine au Palais des sports (1984)	Sauver l'amour (1985)	Ses 7 premières compositions (1986)

Singles from Sauver l'amour
- 1. "L'Aziza" Released: October 1985; 2. "Sauver l'amour" Released: March 1986; 3. "Aimer est plus fort que d'être aimé" Released: November 1986

Sauver l'amour is the eighth and final studio album by French singer Daniel Balavoine, released in October 1985. It became his biggest commercial success, selling over 1.2 million copies.

== Background and release ==
The album was written and composed by Balavoine and nearly all the songs deal with a political or social theme. Similar to his previous album, Loin des yeux de l'Occident, Balavoine wrote the majority of Sauver l'amour on his Fairlight CMI synthesiser at his home studio in Colombes in June 1985. The following month, the album was recorded at Highland Studios in Inverness, and it was mixed at the Studio du Palais des Congrès in Paris in August and September.

Following the release of the album, Balavoine told RTL's Monique Le Marcis that he liked the album so much, he wished it would be his last. Prophetically, Sauver l'amour would be Balavoine's final album as he died in a helicopter accident in January 1986.

The first single released was "L'Aziza" and would become Balavoine's biggest hit with sales increasing considerably after his death. It would go on to become his only number-one and was also certified platinum. The song denounces racism and pays tribute to Balavoine's Jewish-Moroccan wife Corinne. The second single, "Sauver l'amour", looks at war and famine in the Third World. It was not as successful as his previous single, but still sold over 300 thousand copies and peaked at number 5 on the French Top 50. A third single, "Aimer est plus fort que d'être aimé", was also released in late 1986, but failed to make any impact.

In 1986, Balavoine was posthumously awarded the Victoires de la musique for best album that year for Sauver l'amour.

== Track listing ==
All tracks are written by Daniel Balavoine.

Side one
No.	Title	Length
1.	"Aimer est plus fort que d'être aimé"	4:30
2.	"Tous les cris les S.O.S."	5:00
3.	"L'Aziza"	4:25
4.	"Le blues est blanc"	3:35
5.	"Sauver l'amour"	4:15

Side two
No.	Title	Length
6.	"Petite Angèle"	4:48
7.	"Petit homme mort au combat"	4:40
8.	"Ne parle pas de malheur"	4:20
9.	"Un enfant assis attend la pluie"	5:45
Total length:		41:18

== Personnel ==
Musicians

- Daniel Balavoine – vocals, keyboards
- Matt Clifford – keyboards
- Joe Hammer – drums, drum machine, backing vocals
- John Woolloff – guitar
- René Morizur – saxophone
- Aliss Terrell – backing vocals
- Diane Dupuis – backing vocals
- Paula Moore – backing vocals
- Roger Secco – backing vocals
- Yves Chouard – backing vocals

Technical

- Andy Scott – producer
- Frédéric Defaye – assistant producer
- Ken Browar – photography
- Bill Butt and Haymo Kindler for Liaison Internationale – artwork design and concept

== Charts ==
Chart (1986)	Peak position
French Albums (Nielsen/Ipsos Top 20)	1

Chart (2016)	Peak position
French Albums (SNEP)	175
