= Daniel Balavoine =

French singer (1952–1986)

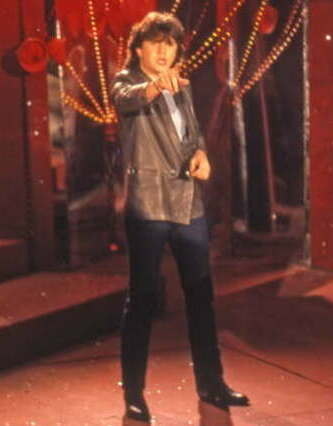
- Daniel Balavoine in 1980

Background information
- Also known as: Bala
- Born: Daniel Xavier-Marie Balavoine; 5 February 1952; Alençon, Normandy, France
- Died: 14 January 1986 (aged 33) Gourma-Rharous, Timbuktu Region, Mali
- Genres: Rock, synthpop, world
- Occupations: Musician, singer-songwriter, producer
- Instruments: Acoustic guitar Piano; Synthesizer; Fairlight CMI
- Years active: 1971–1986
- Labels: Disques Vogue (1971–1973); Barclay Records–Universal Music Group (1975–1986)
- Formerly of: Présence

Daniel Xavier-Marie Balavoine (French pronunciation: [danjɛl ɡzavje maʁi balavwan]; 5 February 1952 – 14 January 1986) was a French singer and songwriter. He was popular in the French-speaking world in the early 1980s; he inspired many singers of his generation such as Jean-Jacques Goldman, Michel Berger, who was his closest friend, as well as the Japanese pop-rock group Crystal King. Balavoine was a part of the original cast of the rock opera Starmania in 1978, which was written by Berger.

Balavoine also took part in motorsports and French political life; he is known for a 1980 televised verbal confrontation with then-Socialist presidential candidate François Mitterrand. In the French music business, he earned his place with his powerful voice, wide range and recognisable lyrics, which were full of sadness and revolt. His songs dealt in themes of despair, pain and death, although hope was present as well.

== Biography ==
=== Childhood ===
Balavoine was born on 5 February 1952 in Alençon, France. He was the youngest in a family of six children. He had two sisters and three brothers. His father, Emile, was an urban engineer and worked for the Reconstruction Ministry. His mother was an antiques wholesaler. In 1959, his father relocated to French Algeria, while Daniel moved to the southern city of Pau and attended a boarding school, an experience he clearly did not enjoy. When he was eleven, he heard "She Loves You" by The Beatles which sparked his taste in music. In 1968, while attending high school, he was one of the many youth who supported the nationwide strikes.

=== With Présence ===
Having fully decided to make a living in music, he began to perform as a ballroom singer in Pau, covering Bob Dylan songs. In 1971, he moved to Paris but was disappointed and returned to Pau. Soon afterwards, he answered an audition in Paris to join a hard rock band, Présence, whose singer had just left. Another future singer, Laurent Voulzy, was his main competition for that position. Ultimately, Balavoine was chosen and went into the studio. The band soon released an album which was not a great success. Despite that, they toured all over France. In 1972, the band signed a contract with Warner Music Group but Balavoine quit the group.

=== Difficulties in Solo Career ===
In 1973, while he was working as a record dealer, The Vogue studios, which produced Présence, contacted him and offered to support him in a solo career. His first Vogue record "Viens vite" was released, but suffered poor sales. Balavoine then became a background vocalist alongside his brother, Guy. Soon afterwards, they starred in a pop musical La Révolution Française.

In 1974, Patrick Juvet, one of the biggest performers in France at the time, offered him the opportunity to be the opening act on his next tour. Balavoine wrote a song for him, "Couleurs d'Automne", which appeared on Juvet's following album.

While attending a show, Léo Missir, vice president of Barclay Records, was impressed by Balavoine's aura and signed him immediately to a 3-year deal which ended up lasting far longer. His first record, "De vous à elle en passant par moi", was released in 1975, but again resulted in disappointing sales.

While recording the album, he met Catherine Ferry, who was chosen as the French candidate for the next Eurovision Song Contest, to take place in the Netherlands. Ferry came in second place with Balavoine and his brother on back-up vocals. This success led to Balavoine and Ferry developing a strong friendship. Balavoine would go on to write most of her songs following her Eurovision success.

In 1977, Balavoine released a second record, "Les aventures de Simon et Gunther" but again it sold poorly and Eddie Barclay began getting impatient.

=== Initial success ===
==== Starmania ====
In 1978, Michel Berger, who had just finished writing Starmania, was still looking for the singer to portray the "Johnny Rockfort" character. While watching TV, he was impressed by Balavoine, who was singing the title song from his latest successful album. He immediately hired Balavoine and a strong brotherly relationship began between the two singers.

Released a few months later, Starmania was a phenomenal success and most of its songs hit the charts. Balavoine performed three of them: "Quand on arrive en ville", "Banlieue Nord" and, most notably, "S.O.S. d'un terrien en détresse", which was written by Berger specifically for Balavoine's voice. "SOS D'un terrien en detresse" became a huge hit nationwide and around the world. In 1992, Peter Kingsbery, the lead singer of the American band Cock Robin, adapted the song in English for Tycoon; the song, named "Only the Very Best," built on the same melody and similar arrangements, but with very different lyrics (by Tim Rice), was also a big hit in France.

Balavoine's solo career was soon very successful, as well, with the release of his third album Le chanteur. The title song, which spoke vividly of the unstoppable rise and fall of an aspiring singer, was a huge commercial success, with one million units sold. The album itself sold 800,000 copies.

At the same time, Balavoine continued touring with Starmania, becoming one of its most notable faces. Between April and May 1979, the musical was performed at the Palais des congrès in Paris, before 100,000 spectators, further increasing Balavoine's popularity.

In 1979, he released his fourth album, Face amour / Face amère (Love side/Bitter side). Though it enjoyed moderate success, its sold fewer copies than the previous album. "Me laisse pas m'en aller" and "Ces petit riens" were the biggest hits from the record. Even still, this last opus allowed him to put on a very successful solo tour throughout France for the first time, with the high point being a three-day stint at the Olympia.

==== Un Autre Monde ====
In 1980, Balavoine returned with his fifth studio album Un autre monde. This record was particularly successful, with three songs hitting huge commercial success: "Mon fils, ma bataille", with 543,000 units sold (about a father's struggle to claim the custody of his son in the aftermath of a breakup, a similar theme to the 1979 movie Kramer vs. Kramer); "Je ne suis pas un héros", originally written for Johnny Hallyday (who later inserted it in his own set list in tribute); and "La vie ne m'apprend rien".

Balavoine went on tour again and came back to the Olympia for four sold-out shows, which gave birth to his first live album Daniel Balavoine en concert in November 1981.

==== Vendeur de Larmes ====
During the winter of 1981, Balavoine went to Ibiza, Spain to write his sixth album. Balavoine decided to radically change his musical style, making it more rock-oriented and using electronic effects. In April 1982, Vendeur de larmes (a pun between "tears" and "weapons") was released, containing hits, such as "Vivre ou Survivre", "Dieu que l'amour est triste" and "Soulève-moi".

The album had huge success becoming a Diamond album after a few months. The following tour was also very popular. During four days, Balavoine performed in Palais des Sports. All his shows were sold out.

=== International work ===
==== Loin des yeux de l'Occident ====
In 1983, Balavoine participated in his first Paris-Dakar Rally. A victim of a breakdown during the first run, he followed the rest of the race as a spectator and discovered Africa. What he saw shocked him: "When, arriving in a small village, we saw a kid looking for flies in order to eat them, there was nothing more to say." After that, he went to Scotland to write his seventh album. Very inspired by his African experience, he released Loin des yeux de L'Occident (Far from the Eyes of the West). According to music specialists, this last record is also his most politically committed. He talks about Third World women in "Pour la femme veuve qui s'éveille" ("For the widow who is waking up"), torture in "Frappe avec la tête" ("Strike with the head"), drugs in "Poisson dans la cage" ("Fish in the cage") and South American dictatorships in "Revolucion".

The melody, very close to one by Peter Gabriel, mixes electronic music (electrical guitar, keyboards etc.) with world music ambient with African drums.

During the same year, he also starred in the musical Abbacadabra, alongside ABBA's Frida Lyngstad. They performed the song "Belle" together.

Following a terrorist bombing in Beirut, Balavoine, whose brother, Yves, was stationed, created a polemic by insulting the French veterans and the government that were pushing the war. Two weeks later, he gave a public apology for the disorder he created.

In 1984, Balavoine returned on the road for a yearlong tour across France. For this new tour, Balavoine introduced new technologies like Vari-Lite lights and HF tech. Balavoine looked for the perfect sound and the perfect ambiance rather than the set, which was furnished sparsely. All his songs were rewritten with very pronounced rock arrangements.

In July, at age 31, Balavoine became a father for the first time. Touched and blessed by the event, he wrote a brand new song "Dieu que c'est beau!" ("God it's so beautiful!") and included it in his tour set list.

He also wrote a full album for his friend Catherine Ferry, using his Fairlight synthesizer for the first time.

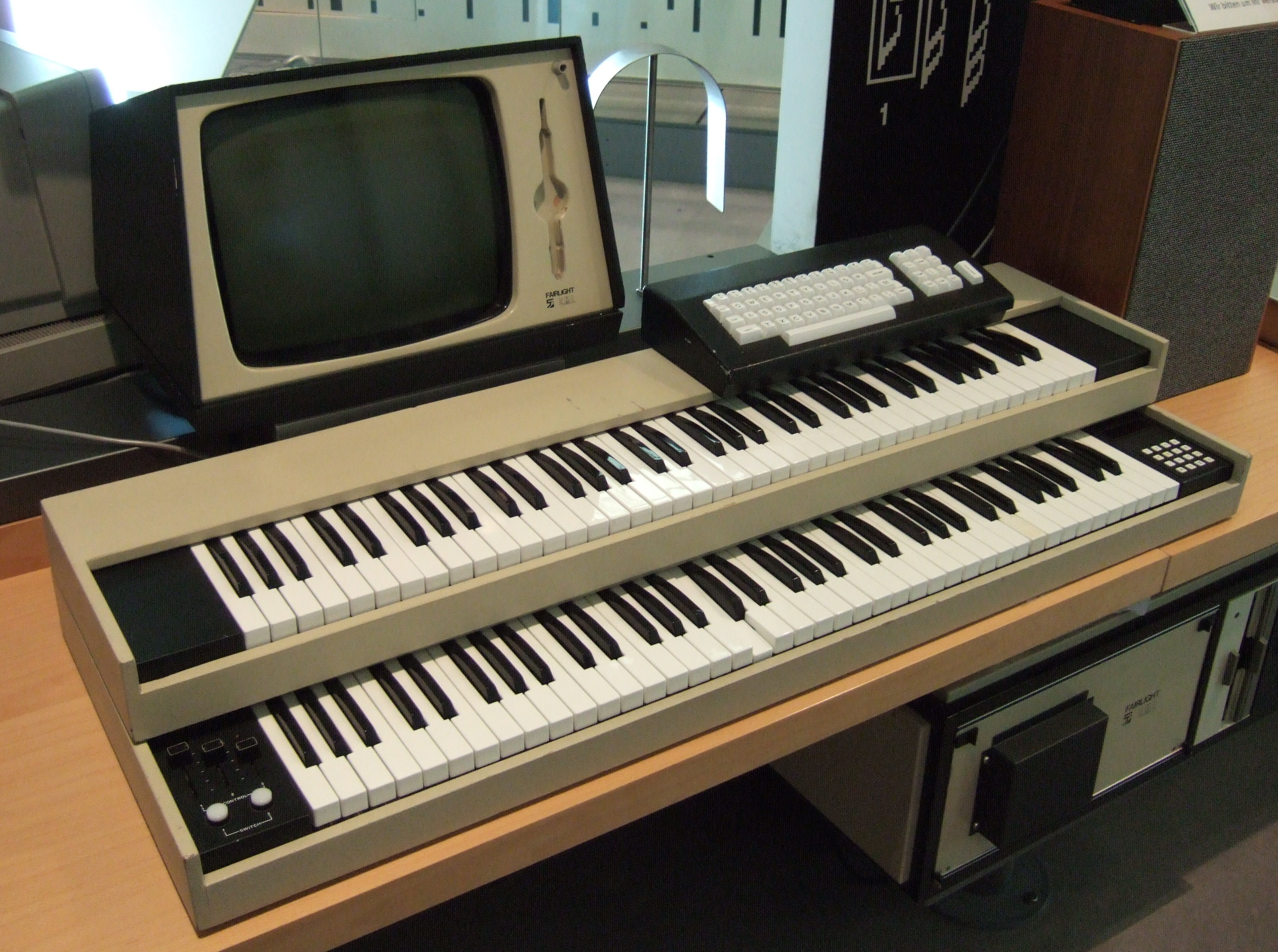
Daniel Balavoine used a Fairlight synthesizer

==== Sauver l'amour ====
In 1985, many prominent music stars were involved in charities and humanitarian events.

French singers, including Balavoine, organised their own event, Singers Without Borders, which was not a big success mostly because of the expensive price of the tickets. Nevertheless, the concert album sold well.

During the Summer, Balavoine went back to Scotland for his eighth and last record: Sauver l'amour. He innovated again using his Fairlight and it was his first album released on CD. The Fairlight allowed Balavoine to insert a lot of electronic effects and sound never heard before.

Most songs of the album became hits: "L'Aziza", in honor of Corinne, his Jewish-Moroccan wife and mother of his son; "Sauver l'amour", the title song, a hymn to love; "Tous les cris les SOS", a song about despair, loneliness, and failure to communicate; "Petit homme mort au combat" about child soldiers.

Balavoine posthumously received the Victoire de la Musique Album of the Year Award in 1986 for Sauver l'amour.

=== Death ===
In 1986, Daniel Balavoine was chosen to lead a fund-raising effort aimed at building water wells in Africa. He was invited by Thierry Sabine, founder and director of the Paris-Dakar Rally, to take advantage of the logistics of the Rally.

On 14 January 1986, whilst in Mali, Balavoine, Sabine, a reporter, and her cameraman boarded Sabine's Eurocopter AS350 Écureuil helicopter to attend a football match. The pilot was François-Xavier Bagnoud (Albert II, Prince of Monaco's cousin). At 7:00 p.m., the helicopter encountered a desert storm and landed. Some time later it took off again but after a few minutes it crashed and disintegrated, killing all five on board, including Balavoine.

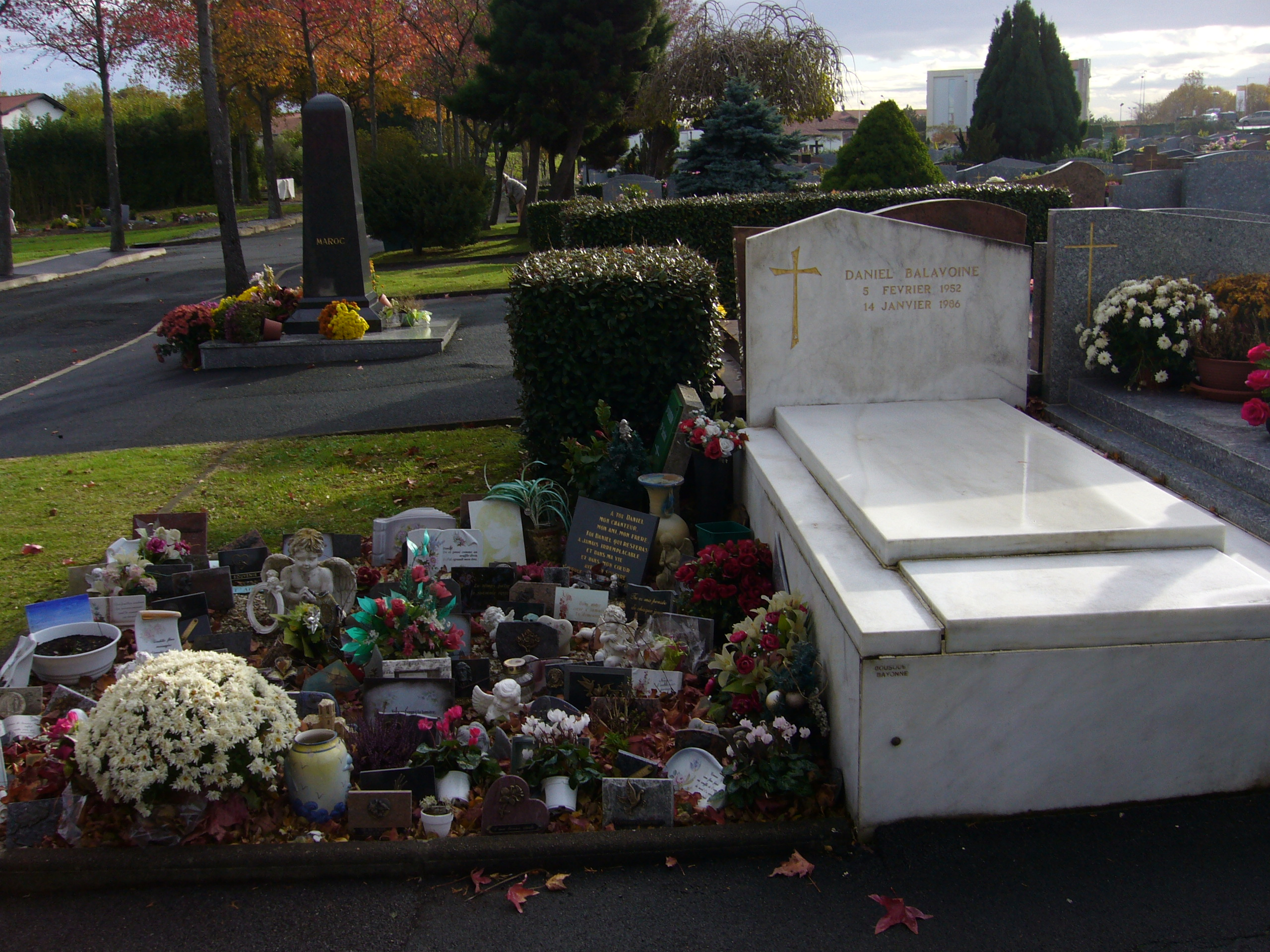
Balavoine's tomb

Balavoine was buried in Biarritz.

== Activism ==
Beginning in 1968, Balavoine became interested in French political life. During the massive strikes and social turmoil in May of that year, he first thought about going into politics. But the end of the movement and General de Gaulle's comeback disappointed him, and he turned his mind to music. In 1980, he confronted François Mitterrand, who was at this time the National Secretary of the French Socialist Party and a French presidential candidate, during a France 2 evening news broadcast, leaving the entire room speechless. During a seven-minute spontaneous speech, an angry Balavoine expressed how he felt about the political situation of the youth in France, namely that the youth was completely ignored by the political world, only interested in their own stuff.

He supported his friend Coluche in his presidential bid. When Coluche finally abandoned it, François Mitterrand, who was impressed by the young artist's aura, asked him to join his campaign team. Balavoine performed during the first meetings, but finally left, feeling he was being used for political purposes. He turned his mind toward humanitarian work, especially in Africa. A few months before his death, he had joined an NGO called Action Ecole, a French charity supported by Bob Geldof, which creates student communities to raise funds for Africa. He was in charge of managing the building of water wells in the Sahel. It was while supervising this project that he died in the crash of Sabine's Eurocopter Ecureuil in Mali.

== Legacy ==
The French public look proudly upon songs like "Vivre ou survivre" (1982), "Dieu que c'est beau" (1984), "L'Aziza", "Sauver l'amour", "Aimer est plus fort que d'être aimé", and "Tous les cris, les SOS" (1985), comparing Balavoine favourably to English language groups like Eurythmics, Queen and Depeche Mode.

Balavoine's songs have been interpreted by many artists, for example Catherine Ferry for whom he wrote nearly 20 songs, Jeanne Mas, Liane Foly, Frida Lyngstad, Lena Ka, Johnny Hallyday, Pascal Obispo, Patrick Fiori, Florent Pagny, Grégory Lemarchal, as well as Marie Denise Pelletier (from Quebec) who had an enormous success with her own rendition of the song "Tous les cris, les SOS" in 1987.

In 1986, Belgian francophone artist Lara Fabian released her first single, "L'Aziza est en pleurs" (composed by Marc Lercs) in honour of Balavoine. In 2006, to mark the 20th anniversary of the singer's death, Barclay Records released his complete recorded works as a boxed set titled Balavoine sans frontières.

On 1 June 2021 Google celebrated him with a Google Doodle.

== Discography ==
=== Studio albums ===
- De vous à elle en passant par moi (1975)
- Les aventures de Simon et Gunther... (1977)
- Le chanteur (1978)
- Face amour / Face amère (1979)
- Un autre monde (1980)
- Vendeurs de larmes (1982)
- Loin des yeux de l'Occident (1983)
- Sauver l'amour (1985)

=== Live albums ===
- Sur scène (1981)
- Au Palais des Sports (1984)

=== Compilations ===
- Ses 7 premières compositions (1986)
- L'essentiel (1999)
- Sans frontières (2005; 12-CD box set containing all of his recorded works, studio and live)
- Balavoine (2012)
- 30ème anniversaire (2015)
- Les 50 plus belles chansons (2016)
- Intégrale (2020)
- L'album de sa vie - 100 titres (2021)
- Le meilleur de Daniel Balavoine (2021)

=== Singles ===
- "Le jour s'est levé" (1971)
- "Viens vite" (1973)
- "Évelyne et moi" (1975)
- "Vienne la pluie" (1975)
- "Sally" (with Melody S.A.) (1976)
- "Lady Marlène" (1977)
- "Ma musique et mon patois"(1977)
- "Je suis bien" (1978)
- "Le chanteur" (1978)
- "Banlieue nord" / "Quand on arrive en ville" (with Starmania) (1979)
- "Lucie" (1979)
- "Me laisse pas m'en aller" (1979)
- "Dancing samedi" (1979)
- "Tu me plais beaucoup" (1979)
- "Mon fils ma bataille" (1980)
- "Lipstick polychrome" (1980)
- "La vie ne m'apprend rien" (live) (1981)
- "Vivre ou survivre" (1982)
- "Vendeurs de larmes" (1982)
- "Soulève-moi" (1982)
- "Pour la femme veuve qui s'éveille" (1983)
- "Belle" (with Frida) (1983)
- "Les petits lolos" (1984)
- "Dieu que c'est beau" (1984)
- "L'Aziza" (1984)
- "Sauver l'amour" (1986)
- "Aimer est plus fort que d'être aimé" (1986)

Posthumous

- "Frappe avec ta tête" (1989)
- "S.O.S. d'un terrien en détresse" (2016)

=== Other projects ===
- Starmania (1978) (sings 5 songs)
- Chrysalide, of Patrick Juvet (1974)
- Patrick Juvet vous raconte son rêve (1973)
- Catherine Ferry "Vivre avec la musique" - producer and composer (1984) WEA
- Abbacadabra (1983) – a children's musical based on songs of Swedish group ABBA

== Filmography ==
- Alors... Heureux? (1980)
- Qu'est-ce qui fait craquer les filles... (1982)
