= Ricky Shayne =

French-Lebanese singer and actor (1944–2024)

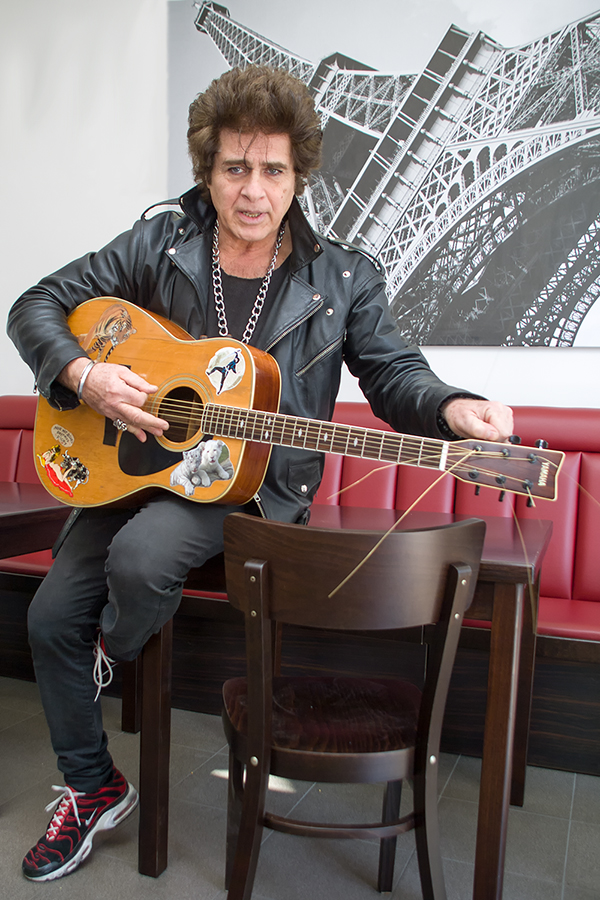
- Shayne in Düsseldorf, 2009

Background information
- Born: George Albert Tabett; 4 June 1944; Cairo, Egypt
- Origin: French and Lebanese
- Died: 8 November 2024 (aged 80) Berlin, Germany
- Genres: pop; schlager
- Occupations: singer; actor; businessman
- Instrument: Guitar
- Label: Hansa Records

Ricky Shayne (4 June 1944 – 8 November 2024) was an Egyptian-born pop singer and actor of French and Lebanese descent who was popular in Europe in the 1960s, especially in Germanophone countries.

== Life and career ==
Shayne was born George Albert Tabett on 4 June 1944 in Cairo, Egypt, to a Lebanese father and a French mother. Young Tabett moved to Paris when he was 15 years old, with his mother, and took music lessons for two years.

He then moved to Italy where, in 1965, under the stage name "Ricky Shayne," he had his first hit with the single "Uno dei Mods" ("One of the Mods"), written by Gianni Meccia and Franco Migliacci. It was featured in the Italian-German 1966 musical film The Battle of the Mods (a.k.a. Crazy Baby) in which Shayne played the role of a "disaffected young man" and sang. The film also featured Udo Jürgens, Joachim Fuchsberger, Elga Andersen, and others, and Shayne moved to (Germany) for the duration of the production.

While in Germany, Shayne recorded the single "Ich sprenge alle Ketten" ("I bust all the chains"), composed by then-unknowns Giorgio Moroder and Michael Holm, which became a national hit and made Shayne an idol among young German fans of pop music. Shayne followed this success with the 1967 singles "Das hat die Welt noch nicht gesehn" ("The world has not yet seen that"), "Es wird ein Bettler zum König" ("Beggar becomes king"), and "Ich mache keine Komplimente" ("I make no compliments").

In 1971, Shayne released his German version of the international hit song "Mamy Blue" that was originally composed in French by Hubert Giraud, which became his greatest success, peaking at No. 7 in the country's national chart. His English version of "Mamy blue" was a No. 8 hit in France, top ten hits in French Belgium and Japan and No. 1 in Argentina and Brazil. The same year, he starred in the German comedy Hurra, wir sind mal wieder Junggesellen! (Hurray We Are Bachelors Again).

Shayne moved to the United States in 1975, occasionally returning to Germany for business ventures and nostalgia concerts. He died in Berlin on 8 November 2024, at the age of 80. His death remained unreported until June 2025.

1. "Ricky Shayne and His «Mamy Blue»: Hasmik Ballarian". The Armenian Mirror Spectator. 18 December 2025.

== Discography ==
=== Singles ===
- 1967: "Ich sprenge alle Ketten"
- 1967: "Heiss wie ein Vulkan"
- 1968: "Du bist zu schön, um allein zu sein"
- 1968: "Buona Notte, Maria"
- 1969: "Ich mache keine Komplimente"

== See also ==
- Mods and rockers

== Other sources ==
- "Ricky Shayne" by Roberto Ruggeri, in G. Castaldo (editor) Dizionario della canzone italiana, Curcio, 1990 (in Italian)
