= Nicoletta (singer) =

French singer

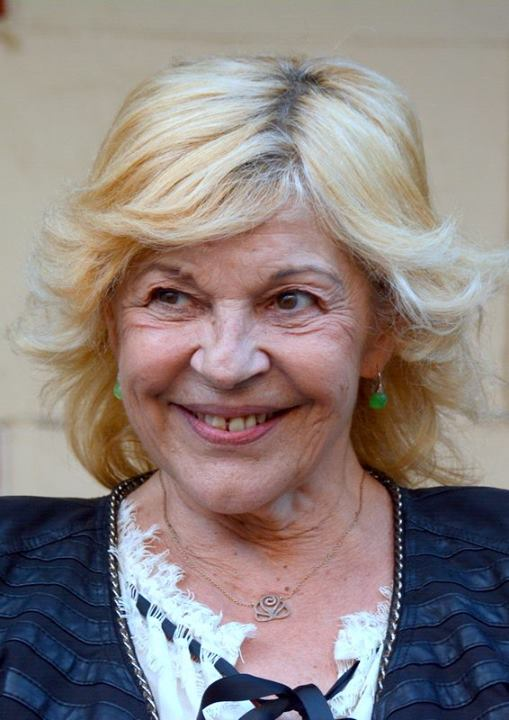
- Nicoletta in 2013

Background information
- Also known as: Nicoletta Grisoni
- Born: Nicole Fernande Grisoni; 11 April 1944 (age 82); Thonon-les-Bains, France
- Genres: Pop, soul
- Occupation: Singer
- Instrument: Vocals
- Years active: 1961 – present
- Website: www.nicolettasiteofficiel.fr

Nicoletta Grisoni, longer name Nicole Fernande Grisoni-Chappuis, better known by her mononym Nicoletta (born 11 April 1944 in Vongy, now merged into Thonon-les-Bains, Haute-Savoie, France) is a French pop singer. Becoming very popular on French radio and television, where she had a number of hits in the 1960s and the 1970s, she was considered part of what is known as the French yé-yé generation, heavily influenced by American music, particularly rhythm and blues, rock and roll and Beat music. She is mostly known for her version of "Mamy Blue".

== Career ==
Nicoletta Grisoni was reportedly born to an intellectually disabled woman who became pregnant as a result of rape. She reportedly chose the song "Mamy Blue" as a tribute to her mother. The original of the song was from the Spanish band Los Pop-Tops and had been the subject of many interpretations.

She began her music as a member of her local church choir. She worked for a while in a laundry and at a medical clinic in addition to DJ-ing in the early 1960s, developing contacts. Encouraged by French songwriter Léo Missir, she was signed to Barclay. Her initial hits included "L'Homme à la moto" (an earlier Edith Piaf song), "Pour oublier qu'on s'est aimé" (from Nino Ferrer), and "Encore un jour sans toi" (co-written by Guy Marchand and Léo Missir).

1967 saw the release of "La Musique" (adaptation from Ann Grégory), and "Il est mort le soleil", written by Pierre Delanoë and music by Hubert Giraud. The song was adapted and interpreted later on by Ray Charles under the title "The Sun Died", also covered by Tom Jones. As an activist, she campaigned against playback music, insisting she sing live in her appearances on television. She also supported the French general strike in May 1968, singing in its support.

In 1971, she recorded a French version of "Mamy Blue", a gospel song composed by Hubert Giraud with massive success. It was a hit in many countries outside France as well. In 1973, she founded her own record label, "Rapa Nui", for producing and launching new talents. The same year, she released "Fio Maravilla", another big hit for her. The origin was a Brazilian hit from Jorge Ben Jor about soccer player Fio Maravilha, adapted to French by lyricist Boris Bergman. In 1976, her French version of The Battle Hymn of the Republic, titled "Glory Alleluia" with new French lyrics and arrangement by André Pascal, became a Christmas hit.

After a hiatus because of her marriage and bearing a child, she returned to music in 1983 with "Idées noires", as a duo with Bernard Lavilliers. In 1987, she took part in the opera Grandeur et décadence de la ville de Mahagonny (a French version of Rise and Fall of the City of Mahagonny by Kurt Weill and Bertolt Brecht), playing the role of Jenny in the opera. The same year, she also took the role of Esméralda in the musical comedy Quasimodo based on Victor Hugo's The Hunchback of Notre-Dame composed by William Sheller.

In the beginning of the 1990s, she suffered great financial problems despite releasing quality interpretations with collaborations from William Sheller, Richard Cocciante, Pierre Delanoë and taking part in galas.

In 2006, Nicoletta released a jazz album Le Rendez-vous on Universal Classics label containing her interpretations of classics including "Summertime", "Georgia on My Mind", "Bei mir bist du schön" and some original materials written by Bernard Lavilliers, Patrick Eudeline and Manu Chao. Nicoletta enjoyed critical acclaim and following, remaining an integral part of French music culture. She became an officer of Ordre des Arts et des Lettres in 2010 in recognition of her musical output.

In 2011, she collaborated with Didier Morville, known as Joeystarr, the former vocalist of Suprême NTM in a new revamped rap version of her hit "Mamy Blue" named "Mamy" with altogether new lyrics. "Mamy" heavily samples on the track, mainly that of Nicoletta's 1971 interpretation. The track appeared on the rapper's album titled Egomaniac, and in September 2012, she gave a concert accompanied by 400 choir members from Saint Gervais, near Bordeaux.

== Personal life ==
In 1978, Nicoletta married Patrick Chappuis, a Swiss jeweller, and the couple had a son in 1979. They divorced in 1985.

== Discography ==
=== Albums ===
- 1967: Il est mort le soleil
- 1969: Olympia
- 1970: Ma vie c'est un manège
- 1971: Visage
- 1973: Nicoletta 73
- 1973: Viens te balader au creux de mes chansons
- 1975: Sur les bords de la tendresse
- 1976: L'amour violet
- 1978: Palace
- 1980: Naturel... ma belle!
- 1982: Qu'est-ce qui m'arrive ?
- 1987: Vivre aujourd'hui
- 1995: J'attends, j'apprends
- 1996: The Gospel Voices
- 1998: Connivences
- 2006: Le rendez-vous
- 2010: Nicoletta en concert
- 2013: Ici et ailleurs
- 2021: Amours & pianos
- 2024: L'intégrale (16-CD box set)

=== Singles ===
  - 1967: "La musique"
  - 1967: "Il est mort le soleil"
  - 1968: "Il ne me restera rien"
  - 1969: "Ma vie c’est un manège"
  - 1970: "Litanies pour un été"
  - 1971: "Mammy Blue"
  - 1973: "Fio Maravilla"
  - 1974: "Glory Alleluia"
  - 1974: "Papillon (Toi qui regarde la mer)"
  - 1975: "À quoi sert de vivre libre?"
  - 1979: "Vive La France 3"
  - 1982: "Vive La France 5"
  - 1985: "La chanson de la vie"
  - 1991: "La Collection (Master Serie)"
  - 1995: "J'Attends, j'Apprends"
  - 2004: "Vive La France 2"
  - 2011: "Vive La France 2011"
  - 2012: "Chansons d'amour"

== Bibliography ==
- 45 Tours et puis s'en va
- La Maison d'en face (éd. Florent Massot) (an autobiography)
