= Esther Galil =

Israeli musical artist

- אסתר גליל
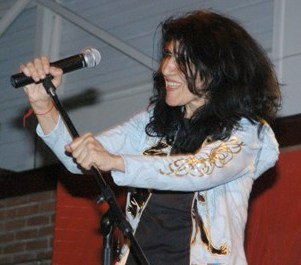
- Born: 28 May 1945 (age 80); Safi, Morocco
- Occupations: Singer-songwriter; musician; painter
- Musical career
- Genres: Middle of the road; rock; pop
- Instruments: Vocals; guitar; piano
- Years active: 1966–present
- Labels: Monde Melody; CBS; Barclay; Sonopresse; RCA; Delove; Carrere; Lala

Esther Galil (Hebrew: אסתר גליל, Arabic: استير الجليل; born May 28, 1945) is a Morocco-born, Los Angeles–based French and Israeli singer and painter. Her song "Le jour se lève" was Number 1 in France for four weeks in September 1971.

== Discography ==
=== Studio albums ===
- Ma Liberté (1974)
- Z. Land (1976)
- Esther Galil (2005)

=== Compilation albums ===
- 80's (2006)
- 90's (2006)
- 70's (2013) (download-only)

=== Extended plays ===
- Oh! Non (1966) (released as 'Jackie Galil')

=== Singles ===
- "תחפושת חדשה" (tr. "New Costume") (1969) (released as 'Jackie Galil' in Israel only)
- "J’attends l’homme" (1971)
- "Le jour se lève" (1971) – No. 1 France, No. 6 Belgium
- "Oh Lord" (1971) – No. 46 France, No. 45 Belgium
- "Les fusils" (1972)
- "Amour ma délivrance" (1972)
- "Ma liberté" (1972) – No. 31 France
- "Delta Queen" (1972)
- "Bald kommt der Morgen (Le jour se lève)" (1972)
- "Shalom dis-moi shalom" (1973)
- "Cherche l’amour" (1973)
- "Das Mädchen, das dich liebt" (1973)
- "Harlem Song" (1973) – No. 19 France
- "Sonja, komm zurück" (1973)
- "On est fait pour vivre ensemble" (1974)
- "Le cri de la terre" (1974)
- "Ma vérité" (1975)
- "With You" (1975)
- "Je m’en vais" (1976)
- "Bossana" (1976)
- "Route number infini" (1977)
- "Lover for Ever" (1978)
- "All or Nothing" (1979)
- "Les mots qui fâchent" (1980)
- "En dehors du blues" (1982)
- "Interdit par la loi" (1988)
