= Mamy Blue =

1970 song by Hubert Giraud

Single by Nicoletta

from the album Visage
- Language: French
- B-side: "Visage"
- Released: 1971
- Label: Riviera
- Songwriter: Hubert Giraud
- Producer: Hubert Giraud

"Mamy Blue"

Single by Ivana Spagna
- Language: Italian
- B-side: "È Finita La Primavera"
- Released: 1971
- Length: 3:45
- Label: Ricordi
- Songwriters: Hubert Giraud; Herbert Pagani

"Mamy Blue" is a 1970 song by French songwriter Hubert Giraud. Originally written with French lyrics, the song was rendered in English in 1971 to become an international hit for the Pop-Tops, Joël Daydé (fr) and Roger Whittaker. A hit in Italy with Italian lyrics for Dalida and in France in its original French for Nicoletta, "Mamy Blue" was also rendered in a number of other languages in cover versions recorded by a good number of local recording artists across continental Europe, while a "local cover" of the English-language version by Charisma reached #1 in South Africa. The song's title is sometimes spelled "Mammy Blue" in the English-speaking world.

== Composition and first recordings ==
"Mamy Blue"

Single by Pop-Tops

from the album Mamy Blue
- Language: English
- B-side: "Road to Freedom"
- Released: 1971
- Label: Carrere; ABC (US and Canada)
- Songwriters: Hubert Giraud; Phil Trim
- Producer: Alain Milhaud

The song was originally written with French lyrics in 1970 by veteran French songwriter Hubert Giraud; he conceived the song in his car waiting out a Parisian traffic jam and had completed its demo within a few days. After four months, the first recorded version of "Mamy Blue" was made – with Italian lyrics – by Ivana Spagna, marking that singer's recording debut.

In May 1971, Alain Milhaud, a Swiss record producer based in Spain, acquired the song for Pop-Tops, a Spanish group he managed. Milhaud produced the Pop-Tops' recording of "Mamy Blue" in a session in London after the group's frontman Phil Trim wrote English lyrics for the song. The French Barclay label expediently had the song covered by both Daydé and Nicoletta: Daydé's version – featuring Phil Trim's English lyric – was recorded at Olympic Sound Studio in London and the Decca Studio in Paris with Angela Morley as arranger, while Nicoletta's version was produced by Hubert Giraud and was the first recording of the song with Giraud's French lyrics.

== Charting versions ==
=== Continental Europe ===
The Pop-Tops and Joël Daydé both reached #1 on the French charts with "Mamy Blue" while the Nicoletta version rose as high as #4, affording the singer her career record. Both the Pop-Tops and Daydé versions became concurrent major hits in several other territories, including Belgium, where the Pop-Tops and Dayde's versions reached #1 on respectively the Dutch and French chart with Pop-Tops reaching #3 on the latter, the Netherlands where Pop-Tops reached #3 and Daydé #13, Norway where Pop-Tops reached #1 and Daydé #3 and Sweden where Pop-Tops reached #1 and Daydé #6. In Spain Daydé's English version of "Mamy Blue" reached #2 while the Pop-Tops reached #1 with a specially recorded version of the song in Spanish. In the same year, Watchpocket recorded the song in USA.

In Germany, the Pop-Tops spent ten weeks at #1 while the Daydé version only charted peripherally at #40: a German rendering recorded by Ricky Shayne would afford Shayne his best ever German chart showing with a #7 peak. The Pop-Tops also rendered "Mamy Blue" in Italian with a resultant #1 in Italy where a local cover by Dalida would chart with a #19 peak: another Italian cover by Johnny Dorelli failed to chart as did the English version by Ricky Shayne in its Italian release. Ricky Shayne's English version did appear in the French Top Ten (peak: #8) with the Daydé, Nicoletta and Pop-Tops versions: Shayne's English-language version also charted in Belgium's French Region (Top Ten).

The Pop-Tops English version also reached #1 in Austria, Denmark, Finland, Sweden and Switzerland, and was a hit in Greece with sales of 50,000 units; in Denmark and Finland the song also reached the Top Ten via an English-language cover by Roger Whittaker – #4 in Finland – while in both territories local translated covers of the song also charted – in Denmark, Eric Aae's version reached #5; in Finland, the cover by Kirka reached #2 below the Pop Tops' #1 ranking.

=== Asia ===
"Mamy Blue" afforded the Pop-Tops a hit in both Israel and Japan with chart peaks of respectively #1 and #2. In addition the Ricky Shayne version was a hit in Japan with sales there of 500,000 units.

=== Latin America ===
"Mammy Blue" topped the Argentine hit parade with a tandem #1 ranking for five versions, being those by James Darren, Ricky Shayne, Roger Whittaker plus a cover by the American male/ female vocal quartet Punch and a local cover by Apocalyptis. The Ricky Shayne version was a #1 hit in Brazil, while the cover by the Bob Crewe Generation was the first version to chart in Uruguay. In Mexico, both the Joël Daydé and Pop-Tops versions ranked in the Top Ten.

=== English-speaking territories ===
==== 1971–72 ====
The Joël Daydé version of "Mamy Blue" reached #3 in Australia, the only evident territory where Daydé did not have to vie with the Pop-Tops, although the cover by Roger Whittaker (as "Mamy Blue") and another by James Darren (as "Mammy Blue") did well enough regionally to register on Australia's national chart with respective peaks of #53 and #47.

In South Africa, "Mammy Blue" was recorded by the session group Charisma featuring vocalists Paddy Powell and Stevie Vann: produced by Graeme Beggs, this version spent twelve weeks at #1, making it the second longest running South African #1 hit, and the longest running #1 hit by a local artist.

In the UK, the Pop Tops vied with the Roger Whittaker cover with neither version reaching the top 30, the respective chart peaks being #35 and #31.

In the US, the Pop Tops was the sole version to reach the Billboard Hot 100, peaking at #57, while the Easy Listening chart in Billboard afforded the Pop-Tops' "Mammy Blue" a #28 peak. However the James Darren cover of "Mammy Blue" – which "bubbled under the Hot 100" in Billboard with a #107 peak – charted on the singles charts in both Record World and Cashbox with respective peaks of #66 and #77. Also Record World afforded the Pop Tops' "Mammy Blue" a higher ranking than the Billboard Hot 100, the single's Record World peak being #44, although its Cashbox chart peak was only #68. Record World also featured a cover by the Bob Crewe Generation, which peaked there at #109.

In Canada, the Pop-Tops vied with a "Mammy Blue" cover by session group Oak Island Treasury Department – these versions respectively peaking at #42 and #68 and Oak Island's version reached #4 on Canada's AC charts. A cover by Roger Whittaker in the original French was a hit on Canada's French charts, reaching #2.

==== Stories version (1973) ====
"Mammy Blue"

Single by Stories
- Language: English
- B-side: "Traveling Underground"
- Released: 1973
- Length: 3:41
- Label: Kama Sutra
- Songwriters: Hubert Giraud; Phil Trim
- Producers: Kenny Kerner; Richie Wise

Stories singles chronology
"Brother Louie" (1973)	"Mammy Blue" (1973)	"If It Feels Good, Do It" (1974)

Stories recorded "Mammy Blue" in 1973 as the followup to their #1 hit "Brother Louie". According to group frontman Ian Lloyd, "The record company was desperate to follow up '...Louie' with [a] similarly-styled tune. 'Mammy...' fit the bill." Faring well enough regionally – notably ranking in the Top Ten in Chicago – to reach a Hot 100 peak of #50, Stories' version of "Mammy Blue" was afforded significantly higher peak positions on the singles charts compiled by both Record World (#38) and Cashbox (#21). Stories also charted with "Mammy Blue" in both Canada and Australia with respective chart peaks of #36 and #46.

== Other versions ==
The English version of "Mammy Blue" has also been recorded by Horace Andy, Julio Iglesias, Bobby Curtola, Pascalis Arvanitidis the Les Humphries Singers, Cherry Laine, Vicky Leandros, Eivind Løberg (no), Muslim Magomayev, Genya Ravan, Demis Roussos, Laima Vaikule; Nicoletta, and Nancy Sit, besides introducing the song in its original French, also recorded the English version.

Celine Dion and Lara Fabian have both made recordings of the original French version of "Mamy Blue", which was remade in 2004 by Neje to reach #75 on the French charts. Jacques Desrosiers (Patof) made a cover in French with different lyrics, as "Patof Blue".

The Spanish version has also been recorded by José Mercé, Daniel Diges and Twiggy (es) while Roberto Blanco (de), Frank Farian and Bata Ilic (de) have each made recordings of the German version. The Finnish version of "Mamy Blue" was also recorded by Fredi in 1972 and by Kirka in 1974.

Translated renderings of "Mamy Blue" have also been recorded by Anda Călugăreanu (ro) (as "O, Mamă, Tu") Romanian, Crazy Boys (as "Dla mamy blues") (pl) Polish, Laércio de Freitas (pt) Portuguese, Kjerstin Dellert Swedish, Yehoram Gaon Hebrew, Karel Gott (as "Ó, Mami, Dík") Czech, Mjöll Holm Icelandic, Kati Kovács Hungarian, Marcela Laiferová (sk) (as "Mami-Blue") Slovak, Anne-Karine Strøm Norwegian, Miro Ungar (hr) Croatian, Vivi Flemish, Lilya Vavrin Ukrainian, Salomon Suvanto Finnish and Emil Dimitrov Bulgarian.

French singer Ricky Shayne recorded both English and German versions of "Mamy Blue", which ranked #7 in the German Top Ten for 20 weeks in 1971.

German guitarist Ricky King recorded an instrumental version.

French orchestra leader Paul Mauriat with Le Grand Orchestre De Paul Mauriat recorded an instrumental version in 1971.

2021 german Guitarist Gregor Hilden recorded a bluesy instrumental version for the Album Gregor Hilden Organ Trio "Vintage Wax"

== Sampling ==
The 2011 rap song "Mamy" by Joeystarr sampled the Nicoletta version of "Mamy Blue" as its backing track. The song appeared on the rapper's album Egomaniac.

== Charts ==
=== Pop-Tops version ===
Chart (1972)	Peak position
France (CIDD)	1
New Zealand (Listener)	6

=== Charisma version ===
Chart (1971–1972)	Peak position
Rhodesia	1
South Africa (Springbok Radio)	1

=== Dalida version ===
Chart (1971)	Peak position
Italy (Discografia internazionale)	19

=== James Darren Version ===
Chart (1971)	Peak position
New Zealand (Listener)	20

== See also ==
- List of French number-one hits of 1971
- List of number-one hits of 1971 (Germany)
