= À partir de maintenant =

Studio album by Johnny Hallyday
- Released: 25 June 1980
- Recorded: 1980
- Studio: Studio du Palais des Congrès, Paris
- Genre: Pop, rock
- Label: Philips, Universal Music
- Producer: Eddie Vartan

Johnny Hallyday chronology
Seul (1979)	À partir de maintenant (1980)	En pièces détachées (1981)

Singles from À partir de maintenant...
- 1. "À partir de maintenant..." Released: June 1980; 2. "Un Diable entouré d'Ange" Released: September 1980

À partir de maintenant... is an album by French singer Johnny Hallyday. It was certified gold by the Syndicat National de l'Édition Phonographique.

== Track listing ==
Source: À partir de maintenant... track listing

No.	Title	Writer(s)	Length
1.	"A partir de maintenant"		3:24
2.	"A double tour" ("Drift Away")	Mentor Williams	3:57
3.	"Le Chanteur sans amour"		3:24
4.	"Je n'suis pas un héros"	Daniel Balavoine	4:10
5.	"La seule fille que j'aime" ("You Are the Girl I Love")	Steve Goodman	4:19
6.	"Un diable entouré d'anges"		3:43
7.	"Qu'est-ce qu'elle fait?"		2:59
8.	"La poupée qui fait non"	Franck Gérald	3:08
9.	"Perdu dans le nombre" ("Feel Like a Number")	Bob Seger	3:17
10.	"La Fille de l'hiver"		3:52

== Charts ==
2000 weekly chart performance for À partir de maintenant...
Chart (2000)	Peak position
French Albums (SNEP)	51

== Certifications and sales ==
Certifications for À partir de maintenant...
Region	Certification	Certified units/sales
France (SNEP)	Gold	100,000^{*}
^{*} Sales figures based on certification alone.
