= Les aventures de Simon et Gunther... =

1977 album by Daniel Balavoine

Studio album by Daniel Balavoine
- Released: April 1977
- Recorded: February 1977
- Studio: Studio Hoche, Paris
- Genre: Progressive rock
- Length: 36:23
- Label: Barclay
- Producer: Léo Missir; Andy Scott

Daniel Balavoine chronology
De vous à elle en passant par moi (1975)	Les aventures de Simon et Gunther... (1977)	Le chanteur (1978)

Singles from Les aventures de Simon et Gunther...
- 1. "Lady Marlène" Released: 1977

Les aventures de Simon et Gunther... is the second album by French singer Daniel Balavoine, released in February 1977. It was a concept album based on the subject of two brothers separated by the Berlin Wall.

== Background and recording ==
Balavoine signed with the record label Barclay in 1975 and recorded his first album De vous à elle en passant par moi. However, the album sold poorly and ended up being a commercial failure. In 1976, his girlfriend at the time, singer Catherine Ferry, was invited to Poland to perform on stage. During their trip to Poland, both Balavoine and Ferry were shocked to discover the poor standards of living and the lack of freedom people there had. At the time, Poland was ruled by a communist government following the country's takeover by the Soviet Union's Red Army in World War II. In an interview, Balavoine later recounted that:

Sur les plateaux de la télévision, j'ai d'abord rencontré un chanteur dont le rêve était d'aller chanter à Paris, à l'Olympia, mais qui ne le pouvait pas... J'ai trouvé ça vraiment odieux et lamentable. Puis dans la ville, j'ai constaté de drôles de choses. Dans mon hôtel, j'ai vu des gens qui vendaient clandestinement des revues pornos. Dans les grands magasins, j'ai vu des rayons avec mille fois la même paire de gants ou le même imperméable... ça m'a remué le cœur, je me sentais mal, j'ai eu envie de gueuler, j'ai pris le prétexte du Mur de Berlin parce que c'était la seule chose qui me paraissait concrète à ce point-là, c'est-à-dire que c'est quelque chose qui est vraiment bâti contre la liberté individuelle et qu'on peut toucher du doigt.

On television sets, I first met a singer whose dream was to go sing in Paris, at the Olympia, but who couldn't... I found it really odious and lamentable. Then in the city, I noticed strange things. In my hotel, I saw people illegally selling porn magazines. In department stores, I saw shelves with the same pair of gloves or the same raincoat a thousand times... it moved my heart, I felt bad, I wanted to scream, I took the pretext of the Berlin Wall because it was the only thing that seemed concrete to me at that point, that is to say something that is really built against individual freedom and that we can touch with our fingers.

— Les Nouvelles littéraires

== Story ==
Simon and Gunther are two German brothers: Simon was born in 1933 and Gunther in 1941. Simon lives in East Berlin and Gunther in West Berlin in Viertel. Their father was arrested in 1942 for desertion. On 13 August 1961, the two brothers have an appointment to meet on rue Bernauer; but being on either side of the wall, soldiers send them home. A series of letters then follows, and the two brothers then plan an escape, with Axel and Lilli, childhood friends who are also separated... Axel and Lilli meet again, they are engaged and expecting a child. We learn that there is no more news from Simon, and that whilst trying to pass, he is killed but Axel manages to pass. We can assume that Gunther is injured but he recovers.

"Correspondances" is an instrumental that opens the album. The subsequent songs tell of the separation, and "Les aventures de Simon et Gunther... Stein" which summarises the lives of the two boys from their birth to the separation. "Lady Marlène" details the attempt to cross the wall and "La lettre à Marie", set several years later, shows Gunther gradually regaining his footing, surrounded by the rest of his family and friends. "Ma musique et mon patois" concludes the album, but it is not related to the overall story, as in this song Balavoine defends French rock music (a theme that Balavoine would also later sing about on "Le français est une langue qui résonne").

== Release and reception ==
Les aventures de Simon et Gunther... was released in April 1977 and was given a bigger promotion than Balavoine's first album. One single, "Lady Marlène", was released and was broadcast by some radio stations, notably numerous times on Europe 1. Balavoine was also invited to perform the song on several television shows including Un sur cinq, presented by Patrice Laffont, and Musique and Music, presented by Jacques Martin. Thanks to his performance on the latter, Balavoine was discovered by Michel Berger who offered him a role performing in the rock opera Starmania. The success of the musical's cast recording album, released in September 1978, helped propel Balavoine's career, with his subsequent album, Le chanteur, going on to sell over 800 thousand copies.

Les aventures de Simon et Gunther... was praised by critics. One review by France-Soir applauded the originality of the album, commending the handling of the subject of the album. Another, by Sud Ouest described it as "undeniably one of the great revelations of the year". (Note: "… ce disque fait indéniablement partie des grandes révélations de l'année".) Barclay's artistic director, Léo Missir, was also effusive in his praise of the album. However, he also later said:

J'étais content sans vraiment pouvoir l'être... parce que j'étais dingue de ce disque et je savais qu'il serait difficile de le faire admettre en radio. Comme c'est moi qui allais directement voir les programmateurs, je savais que j'allais plus ou moins au bide… avec un disque exceptionnel !

I was happy without really being able to be... because I was crazy about this record and I knew it would be difficult to get it on the radio. As I was the one going directly to see the programmers, I knew that I was more or less going to fail… with an expectational record!

— Je m'présente, je m'appelle Daniel

However, the album was not as well received by the public, selling fewer than 10 thousand copies. Barclay founder Eddie Barclay was also not impressed with the subject of the album, considering it irrelevant. Also, unlike Léo Missir, Barclay was not keen on Balavoine and after the commercial failure of Les aventures de Simon et Gunther..., he was further unimpressed and demanded that Balavoine produce a successful album otherwise he would be let go from the label.

== Track listing ==
All tracks are written by Daniel Balavoine, except where noted.

Side one
No.	Title	Length
1.	"Correspondances"	2:45
2.	"La porte est close"	3:17
3.	"La réponse"	3:18
4.	"Mon pauvre Gunther"	3:10
5.	"J’entends cogner ton cœur"	4:15

Side two
No.	Title	Writer(s)	Length
6.	"Lise Altmann"		3:00
7.	"Les aventures de Simon et Gunther… Stein"	Daniel Balavoine, Guy Guermeur	2:55
8.	"Lady Marlène"		4:50
9.	"La lettre à Marie"	Daniel Balavoine, Bernard Balavoine	4:43
10.	"Ma musique et mon patois"	Daniel Balavoine, Bernard Balavoine	4:13
Total length:			36:23
