= Sauver l'amour =

Single by Daniel Balavoine

from the album Sauver l'amour
- B-side: "Petite Angèle"
- Released: 18 March 1986
- Recorded: 1985, Highland Studios, Scotland
- Genre: Pop
- Length: 4:15; 5:45 (remix version)
- Label: Barclay
- Songwriter(s): Daniel Balavoine
- Producer(s): Andy Scott

Daniel Balavoine singles chronology
"L'Aziza" (1985)	"Sauver l'amour" (1986)	"Aimer est plus fort que d'être aimé" (1986)

"Sauver l'amour" is a 1985 song recorded by French singer Daniel Balavoine. It was the second single from his eighth and last album of the same name and was released posthumously in March 1986. It was a hit in France, although it was not as successful as the previous song, "L'Aziza".

== Music, lyrics and versions ==
Written and composed by Daniel Balavoine, "Sauver l'amour" deals with various situations of war and misery in the Third World – at that time, famine ravaged Ethiopia and there were some wars like the one in Iran / Iraq – and the music video displays certain of these situations. According to French chart expert Elia Habib, the verses use the same form of words to rhyme, but each verse has "its own identity through its musical color". "The first [verse] is smooth, in contrast with the second one in which percussion are very marked". The song is also available on Balavoine's posthumous best of compilations Sans frontières (2005) on which it appears also in a remixed version, and Les 50 plus belles chansons (2008).

== Charts performance ==
In France, "Sauver l'amour" went to number 16 on 16 April 1986 on the SNEP Singles Chart, and reached number five seven weeks later, spending 18 weeks on the chart. On the over Eurochart Hot 100, it started at number 59 on 10 May 1986, peaked at number 47 and fell off the chart after 18 weeks. It also appeared for seven weeks on the European Airplay Top 50, with a peak at number 16 in its fifth week.

== Cover versions ==
"Sauver l'amour" was covered in 2005 by contestants from the fifth season of Star Academy on its tribute album Chante Daniel Balavoine. Some members of Les Enfoirés performed the song which was included in their 1997 album Le Zénith des Enfoirés.

== Track listings ==
7" single

No.	Title	Length
1.	"Sauver l'amour"	4:15
2.	"Petite Angèle"	4:48

Digital download

No.	Title	Length
1.	"Sauver l'amour"	4:22
2.	"Sauver l'amour" (remix)	5:45

== Charts ==
Weekly chart performance for "Sauver l'amour"
Chart (1986)	Peak position
Europe (European Hot 100)	47
Europe (European Airplay Top 50)	16
France (SNEP)	5
Quebec (ADISQ)	16
