= Pop-Tops =

Spanish band

- Origin: Madrid, Spain
- Genres: Pop
- Years active: 1967–1974
- Labels: Barclay Sonoplay (Spain); Explosion (Spain); Bellaphon (Germany)
- Past members: Phil Trim; Julián Luis Angulo; Alberto Vega; Enrique Gómez; Ignacio Pérez; José Lipiani; Ray Gómez; Francisco Urbano Romero; Rafael Guillermo Gertrudis

Pop Tops (or Los Pop-Tops) were a vocal/instrumental band, formed in 1967 in Madrid, Spain, with Phil Trim from Trinidad and Tobago as lead singer. Their sound was a blend of baroque pop with the soulful vocals of Trim.

== Members ==
Original line-up included:

- Phil Trim (born 5 January 1940, in Trinidad and Tobago) – lead singer
- Julián Luis Angulo – guitar, vocals
- Alberto Vega – saxophone, clarinet, vocals
- Enrique Gómez – bass, trumpet
- Ignacio Pérez – organ, piano
- José Lipiani – drums
- Ray Gómez (27 February 1953 – c. 9 July 2026) – guitar

Some changes occurred in members:

- Francisco Urbano Romero – drums (replacing José Lipiani)
- Rafael Guillermo Gertrudis – keyboards, piano (replacing Ignacio Pérez)

== Hits ==
Their first release to gain attention was "Oh Lord, Why Lord" (1968), written by Jean Marcel Bouchety and Phil Trim. It was the first pop song to incorporate the melody of Pachelbel's Canon in D. That single's b-side, "The Voice of the Dying Man" (based on a Johann Sebastian Bach composition) was also recorded in Spanish as "La Voz del Hombre Caido".

They are best known for their 1971 hit "Mamy Blue", referring to a son's poignant song addressed to his departed mother about his childhood memories and life in general, sometimes spelled "Mommy Blue", "Mammy Blue" or "Mummy Blue", which was a Top 10 hit throughout much of Europe, Japan (#2), and Canada (#42), and a minor Billboard Hot 100 chart hit in the United States (#57). It was covered in the US by the Stories peaking at No. 50 in 1973. It sold over one million copies, and was awarded a platinum record. The composer and lyricist of the French song "Mamy Blue" was Hubert Giraud. English lyrics were written by Phil Trim. The Pop Tops also recorded Italian and Spanish versions, with lyrics by Gefingal.

As follow-up singles they released "Suzanne Suzanne" (early 1972) and "Hideaway" (mid 1972), which were only minor hits in some European countries.

== Discography ==
=== Albums ===
| Title | Year | Peak positions |
| Title | Year | GER |
|---|---|---|
| Canarios | 1968 | — |
| Mamy Blue | 1971 | 30 |
| Top Pops of Pop Tops | 1976 | — |

=== Singles ===
| Title | Year | Peak positions | | | | | | | Album |
| Title | Year | AUS | AUT | GER | ESP | SWI | UK | US | Album |
|---|---|---|---|---|---|---|---|---|---|
| "Oh Lord, Why Lord" | 1968 | — | — | — | 1 | — | — | 78 | Canarios |
| "Mamy Blue" | 1971 | — | 3 | 1 | 1 | 1 | 35 | 57 | Mamy Blue |
| "Suzanne Suzanne" | 1972 | — | — | 16 | 23 | — | — | — | Top Pops of Pop Tops |
| "Hideaway" | 1972 | — | — | 22 | — | — | — | — | Top Pops of Pop Tops |
| "My Little Woman" | 1973 | 75 | — | — | — | — | — | — | |

=== Spanish releases ===
Barclay, Spain

- 1967: Con su blanca palidez / I Can't Go On
- 1967: Viento to otoño (Autumn Winds) / Cry
- 1968: Somewhere / The Voice of the Dying Man (La voz del hombre caido)
- 1968: Oh Lord, Why Lord / Beyond the Sea (El mar)
- 1968: Oh Lord, Why Lord (in Spanish) / El mar
- 1968: Esa mujer (That Woman) / Adagio cardenal
- 1968: That Woman / The Man I Am Today
- 1969: Pepa / Junto a ti
- 1969: Dzim-dzim-dzas (Love and Care) / Young and Foolish
- 1970: Soñar, bailar y cantar (She's Coming Back) / Anytime

Explosion, Spain

- 1971: Dios a todos hizo libres (Road to Freedom) / Movimento de amor
- 1971: Road to Freedom / Who Will Believe
- 1971: Mamy Blue (span.) / Love Motion
- 1971: Mamy Blue / Grief and Torture
- 1972: Suzanne Suzanne / Happiness Ville
- 1972: Suzanne Suzanne (in Spanish) / Walk along by the Riverside
- 1972: Hideaway / What a Place to Live In
- 1973: My Little Woman / Girl, What's on Your Mind?
- 1973: Happy, Hippy, Youppy Song / Where Can I Go
- 1973: Happy, Hippy, Youppy Song (in Spanish) / Angeline
- 1974: What a Way to Go / Baby I Will Cry

=== German releases ===
Bellaphon, West Germany

- 1971: Mamy Blue / Road to Freedom
- 1971: Oh Lord, Why Lord / Walk Along by the Riverside (Remake)
- 1972: Suzanne Suzanne / Happiness Ville
- 1972: Hideaway / What a Place to Live In
- 1973: My Little Woman / Girl, What's on Your Mind?
- 1973: Happy, Hippy, Youppy Song / Where Can I Go
- 1973: What a Way to Go / Baby I Will Cry
