= L'Aziza =

Single by Daniel Balavoine

from the album Sauver l'amour
- B-side: "Tous les cris les S.O.S"
- Released: 14 October 1985
- Recorded: July 1985
- Studio: Highland (Inverness, Scotland)
- Genre: Pop
- Length: 4:21
- Label: Barclay
- Songwriter: Daniel Balavoine
- Producer: Andy Scott

Daniel Balavoine singles chronology
"Dieu que c'est beau" (1984)	"L'Aziza" (1985)	"Sauver l'amour" (1986)

"L'Aziza" is the name of a 1985 song recorded by French singer Daniel Balavoine and released as a single from his album Sauver l'amour in October 1985. The song was very successful, particularly after the singer's death, topping the chart in France for two months. This song was played at the 2024 Paris Olympics opening ceremony.

== Lyrics ==
Composed by Balavoine and produced by Léo Missir, "L'Aziza" has a title which means 'My dear' in Arabic, although it is sung in French-language. Lyrically, Balavoine pays tribute to his Jewish Moroccan wife Corinne and denounces racism. In France, "L'Aziza" became a standard song throughout the years. The song was remixed the same year of the album release and came out as a 7". It features on Balavoine's best of Balavoine sans frontières, released about twenty years after the singer's death. The music video was directed by Oliver Chavarot.

== Cover versions ==
"L'Aziza" was also recorded in 2000 by Khaled for the compilation album Balavoine: Hommages... on which various artists covered Balavoine's songs. The song was also covered in France by Star Academy 5 for its album Chante Daniel Balavoine, on which it features as fifth track. The song L'aziza was also covered by hip-hop/rap artist Féfé in 2016.

The B-side, "Tous les cris, les S.O.S.", was covered by many artists, including Jeanne Mas in 1987, Marie-Denise Pelletier, Lena Kann in 1998 (number 14 in France, Silver disc) and Les Enfoirés in 2008.

== Chart performance ==
"L'Aziza" entered the French Singles Chart at number 40 on 23 November 1985, gained a few places every week, and when the singer's death was announced in the media, jumped straight to number where it stayed for eight consecutive weeks. It cumulated 14 weeks in the top ten and for 26 weeks in the top 50. It was certified Platinum disc by the Syndicat National de l'Édition Phonographique in 1985 for selling 1 million copies in France. On the overall Eurochart Hot 100, it peaked at number 20 in its 14th week of presence, and appeared on the chart for a total of 24 weeks.

== Track listings ==
7" single

1. "L'Aziza" — 4:21
2. "Tous les cris, les S.O.S." — 5:04

== Certifications and sales ==
Region	Certification	Certified units/sales
France (SNEP)	Platinum	1,000,000^{*}
^{*} Sales figures based on certification alone.

== Charts ==
=== Weekly charts ===
Chart (1985–1986)	Peak position
Europe (European Hot 100)	20
Europe (European Airplay Top 50)	16
France (SNEP)	1
Quebec (ADISQ)	16

=== Year-end charts ===
Chart (1986)	Position
Europe (European Hot 100)	79

== See also ==
- List of number-one singles of 1986 (France)
