= List of big band musicians =

The following is a list of big band musicians.

- Ray Anthony (b. 1922)
- Buster Bailey (1902–1967)
- Count Basie (1904–1984)
- John Beasley (b. 1960)
- Bix Beiderbecke (1903–1931)
- Les Brown (1912–2001)
- Xavier Cugat (1900–1990)
- Jimmy Dorsey (1904–1957)
- Duke Ellington (1899–1974)
- Chico Freeman (b. 1949)
- Dizzy Gillespie (1917–1993)
- Lionel Hampton (1908–2002)
- Andy Kirk (1898–1992)
- Eddie Lang (1902–1933)
- Wynton Marsalis (b. 1961)
- Buddy Rich (b. 1917)
- Gene Krupa (b. 1909)
- Johnny Griffin (b. 1928)
- George Paxton (1914–1989)
- Joe Venuti (1903–1978)
- Chick Webb (1905–1939)
- Teddy Wilson (1912–1986)
