= Michel Orso =

French singer-songwriter (born 1936)

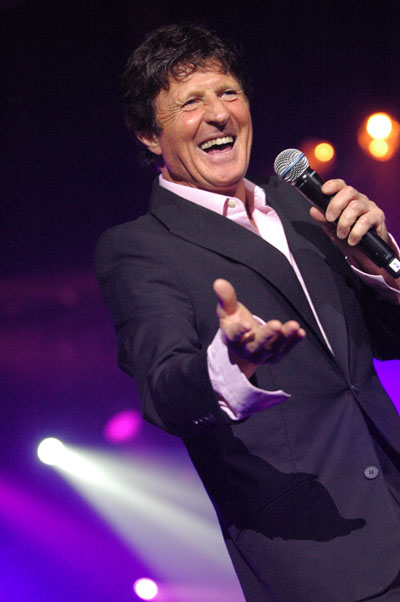

Orso Paolo Bertolucci (born 12 December 1936), known professionally as Michel Orso (French pronunciation: [miʃɛl ɔʁso]), is a French singer-songwriter. He is best known in for his 1966 French hit song "Angélique".

== Early life ==
Orso was born in Prunelli-di-Casacconi, a mountain village on the northeastern side of the Mediterranean island of Corsica, a regional department of France with strong historical and cultural ties to Italy. His father died before his birth and he was separated from his destitute mother, growing up in an orphanage during and just after World War Two. He performed as a soloist in the choir of the orphanage and was recruited to sing Vespers in Corsican churches.

Leaving the orphanage as a teenager he was reunited with his mother, supporting her while working during the day as a baker, butcher, and mason, and singing in the evening at parties and with friends. Eventually he was invited to perform at local weddings, baptisms, and communions, and entered regional amateur singing competitions. In his early twenties Orso decided to leave Corsica for the French capital Paris to pursue a professional singing career. There he sang with several orchestras and was eventually hired to tour the south of France with Adamo, Eddy Mitchell, and Enrico Macias.

== Commercial breakthrough ==
In 1966, he wrote and recorded the 45 RPM single Angélique. French radio stations introduced the song and it became a wild success, selling 300,000 copies in just a few weeks. Orso acknowledges that this song was the key turning point in his life and career. He also wrote the minor French hits Ma vérité c'est toi (You are My Truth), Le veston à carreaux, (The Plaid Jacket), L'enfant de la rue (The Street Child) and L'ami tu nous reviens (The Friend Who Came Back).

== Comeback ==
In the early 1970s, Orso began a period of relative commercial obscurity which would last 35 years. In 2006, he toured France with a show dedicated to his long-time idol, singer-songwriter Gilbert Bécaud. Since then he is the only performer to have participated in all of the very popular, annually held 60's and 70's nostalgia reviews Âge tendre, la tournée des idols (Tender Age, the tour of idols) – formerly called Âge tendre et têtes de bois (Tender age and wooden heads, a popular song by Bécaud). As of 2015 Michel Orso still performs regularly, occasionally alongside friend and musician François Grimaldi at the Corsican restaurant-cabaret Le Lamarck in Paris' Montmartre district.

== Discography ==
- Angélique
- Mon veston à carreaux
- Un sourire qui en disait long
- Le globe trotter
- Ma vérité
- La mouette
- Moitié-Moitié
- Pochette surprise
- Sans toi
- Chanson pour ma muse
- La mouette
- Du temps de mes 42 ans
- Ces enfants là
- Marie–Juliette
- Ce petit bout
- De souvenir
- La marchand de pluie
- Hier, c'était pour rien
- L'oiseau du voyage
- Belle la vie est belle
- J'ai des larmes dans les yeux
- Chanson pour vous
- Toi et moi
- Au soleil de Vincent Scotto
- On a bien raison de croire
- Ce sera notre été
