= En pièces détachées =

Studio album by Johnny Hallyday
- Released: January 17, 1981
- Recorded: 1980
- Genre: Pop, rock
- Label: Philips, Universal Music
- Producer: Eddie Vartan

Johnny Hallyday chronology
Seul (1980)	En pièces détachées (1981)	Pas Facile (1981)

Singles from En pièces détachées
- 1. "Chez Madame Lolita" Released: December 1980; 2. "Excusez moi de Chanter Encore du rock'n' Roll" Released: April 17, 1981

En pièces détachées is an album by the French singer Johnny Hallyday.

== Track listing ==
1. Deux Étrangers ("Brave Strangers") 5:12
2. Je peux te faire l'amour 4:11
3. Lady Divine 3:33
4. Chez madame Lolita 3:55
5. Excusez-moi de chanter encore du rock'n'roll 2:26
6. Monsieur Paul 4:04
7. Guerre ("Red") 3:53
8. La nuit crie au secours ("Every Time I Think of You") 3:39
9. Cette fille-là 3:04
10. Le Blues, ma guitare et moi 5:36

Source: En Pièces Détachées track listing
