= Hubert Giraud =

French composer and lyricist (1920–2016)

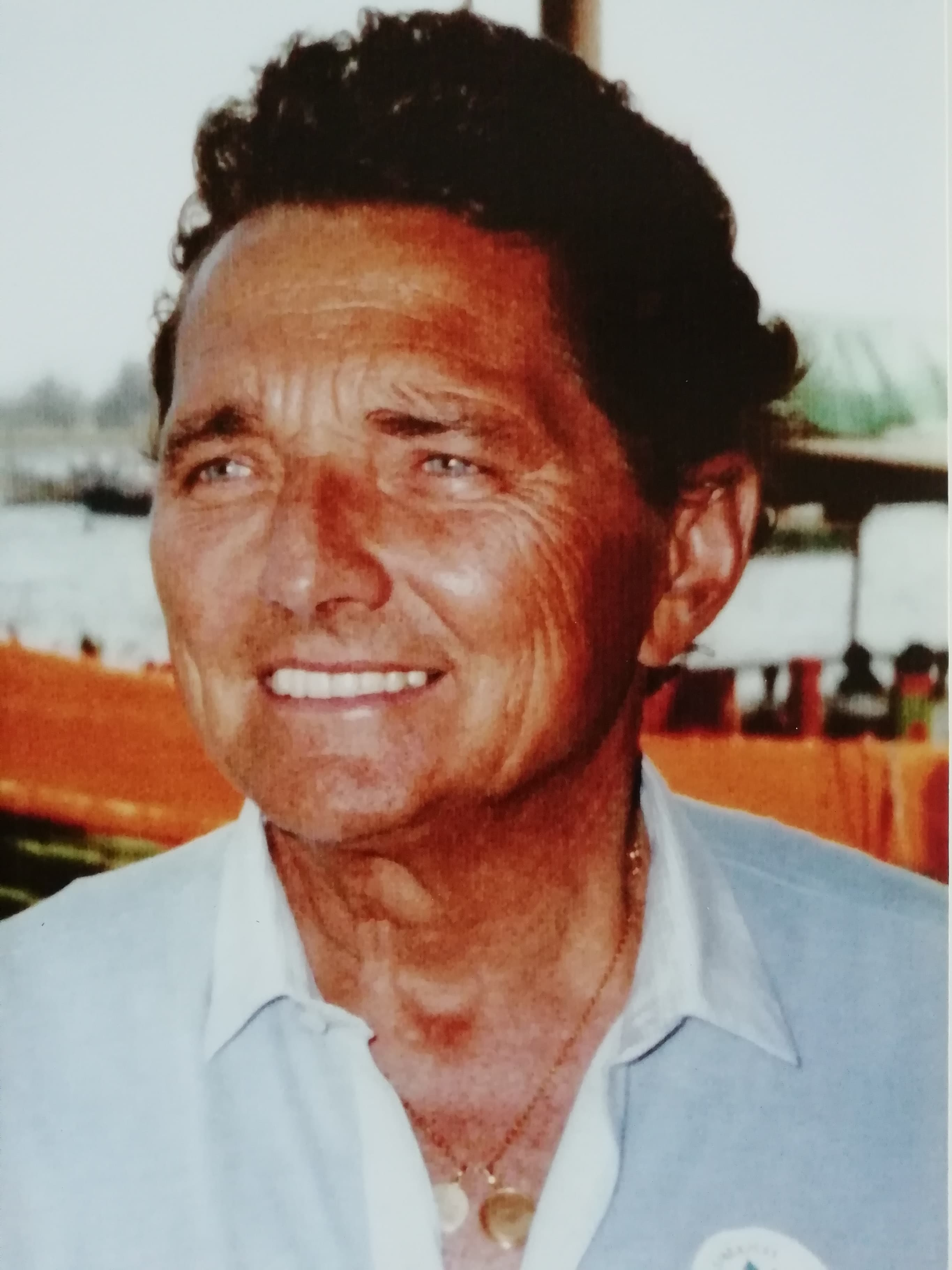
- Born: Hubert Yves Adrian Giraud; 3 March 1920; Marseille, France
- Died: 16 January 2016 (aged 95); Montreux, Switzerland
- Occupations: Composer and lyricist

Hubert Yves Adrian Giraud (French pronunciation: [ybɛʁ ʒiʁo]; 3 March 1920 – 16 January 2016) was a French composer and lyricist.

== Career ==
Giraud began his career playing the harmonica with Django Reinhardt's jazz group, the Quintette du Hot Club de France. In 1941, he was recruited by Ray Ventura to play the guitar during Ventura's big-band tour of South America. Six years later, he joined Jacques Hélian's orchestra in scoring a series of post-war romantic comedy films, including Georges Combert's 1951 feature, Musique en tête.

His song "Dors, mon amour", performed by André Claveau, won the Eurovision Song Contest 1958.

Giraud (with lyricist Pierre Cour) wrote the song "Gitans" (a.k.a. "Les Gitans"). It was further translated into English by B. Guilgud (a.k.a. Guilgudo) and A. Gill and recorded by Corry Brokken. Sergio Franchi recorded an English and Italian version (Italian lyrics by Leo Chiosso) on his 1965 RCA album Live at the Cocoanut Grove.

Giraud also wrote the music for the songs "Sous le ciel de Paris" in 1951 and "Mamy Blue" in 1970.

== Selected filmography ==
- Music in the Head (1951)
- The Fighting Drummer (1953)
- The Triumph of Michael Strogoff (1961)

== See also ==
- List of big band musicians
- List of French composers
- List of jazz musicians
- List of songwriters
