= Riviera-LM Records =

Riviera-LM Records was a French record label.

== History ==
Riviera-LM was founded in 1951 by French record producer Eddie Barclay. The label produced new singers and bands. Riviera-LM production facilities in Milan produced Italian editions of foreign artists, including Nino Ferrer and Peter Holm. Riviera was distributed in Spain and Portugal.

In September 1964 Barclay and Phillipe Loury, then president of Erato Records, founded Compagnie européenne du disque (CED) to distribute records. Riviera and Erato were the first two labels used by the system. Riviera later became Riviera-LM, run by Leo Missir. Riviera was distributed in Spain and Portugal.

Riviera gained distribution rights for Chess, Atlantic and Stax. It compiled many recordings of these labels by initiating a system of direct imports from the US for distribution in France.

=== Partial sale of Disques Barclay ===
On November 16, 1978, PolyGram acquired a 40% interest in Disques Barclay and Societe Generale also acquired 40%, leaving Barclay with 20% of the company. Barclay remained president and retained operating independence in terms of artistic, commercial and distribution activity.

=== Sale of Disques Barclaly ===
In 1979, hit by the music industry crisis, Barclay sold his company, which included the Riviera label, to Philips-owned conglomerate PolyGram. His labels survived as a unit of PolyGram and then Universal Music Group.

== Selected artists ==
The best-known singers who worked with the subsidiary of Barclay Records were Nino Ferrer, Guy Marchand, and Daniel Balavoine, including albums that came out under the Barclay / Riviera labels from 1978 to 1984. Others were Raymond Lefèvre, Jean Musy (fr), Nicoletta and Michel Orso.

== Other labels named Riviera ==
The Riviera of this article should not be confused with Riviera Records, an American label founded by Eddie Heller, who also founded Rainbow Records.

== Selected discography ==
Catalog No.	Year	Artist	Album title
RIV/LP 80005	1969	Nino Ferrer	Agostino Ferrari ovvero Nino Ferrer
RIV/LP 80006	1969	Nino Ferrer	Per voi giovani
RIV/LP 80011	1970	David Alexander Winter	Oh Lady Mary
RIV/LP 80016	1970	Nino Ferrer	Rats and rolls

=== 45 rpm ===
Catalog No.	Year	Artist	Titles
RIV 501	1966	Ricardo	"Per ognuno c'è qualcuno"/"Un amour"
RIV 503	1965	Evy	"Giochi proibiti"/"Ma che magnifico ricordo"
RIV 504	1966	Nino Ferrer	"E' colpa tua"/"Me ne andrò"
RIV 508	1966	Ricardo	"La carta vincente"/"Un po' di pioggia giù"
RIV 509	1966	Guy Marchand	"L'appassionata"/"Vi vedo perplessa"
RIV 511	1966	Nino Ferrer	"Mirza"/"La mia vita per te"
RIV 513	1966	Ricardo	"Solo più che mai"/"Benvenuto mio amore"
RIV 514	1966	Patricia Carli	"Il male che fai"/"Un giorno a te ritornerà"
RIV 516	1966	Aimè Barelli	"Le Stop Op"/"Le Bal Des Petits Lits Blancs"
RIV 521	1967	Michel Mallory (fr)	"Accipicchia l'Angelicchia"/"Una casa"
RIV 5020	1967	Nino Ferrer	"La pelle nera"/"Se mi vuoi sempre bene"
RIV 5023	1967	Nino Ferrer	"Le telephone"/"Mao et moa"
RIV 5024	1967	Nino Ferrer	"Al telefono"/"La mia vita per te"
RIV/NP 77004	1968	Nino Ferrer	"Il re d'Inghilterra"/"Una bambina bionda"
RIV/NP 77006	1968	Nino Ferrer	"Non ti capisco più"/"Marilù"
RIV/NP 77009	1969	Michel Orso	"Se te ne vai"/"E mai, e mai"
RIV/NP 77015	1969	Nino Ferrer	"Donna Rosa"/"Monsieur Machin"
RIV/NP 77019	1969	Peter Holm	"Cosa fai senza me"/"Come te"
RIV/NP 77020	1969	Nino Ferrer	"Mamadou Memé"/"Il baccalà"
RIV/NP 77026	1969	Michel Polnareff	"Tout, tout pour ma cherie"/"Tous le bateaux tous les oiseaux"
RIV/NP 77027	1969	Nino Ferrer	"Agata"/"Les petites filles de bonne famille"
RIV/NP 77027	1969	Nino Ferrer	"Agata"/"La Rua Madureira"
RIV/NP 77033	1970	Peter Holm	"Miss Jane"/"Cerca un posto"
RIV/NP 77034	1970	Nino Ferrer	"Chiamatemi Don Giovanni"/"Je vends dse robes"
RIV/NP 77036	1970	Nino Ferrer	"Re di cuori"/"Un giorno come un altro"
RIV/NP 77037	1970	Nino Ferrer	"Viva la campagna"/"La Rua Madureira"
RIV/NP 77043	1970	Nino Ferrer	"Io, tu e il mare"/"Les Yeux de Laurence"
RIV/NP 77050	1971	Nino Ferrer	"Amsterdam"/"Gertrude"
RIV/NP 77062	1972	The Popcorn Makers	"Popcorn"/"Toad In The Hole"
RIV/NP 77063	1973	Rocky Roberts	"Mathusalem"/"Looking Back"
