= Léo Missir =

French composer

Léo Missir (1925–2009) was a French composer and producer born on April 30, 1925 in Vathy on the Greek island of Samos.

Missir worked with notable artists throughout his career such as Édouard Barclay, Daniel Balavoine, Leny Escudero, and Nicoletta. He was also credited on the soundtracks of several films, including Flying (1986), Populaire (2012), and Whatever (1999).
