= Eddie Barclay =

French music producer (1921–2005)

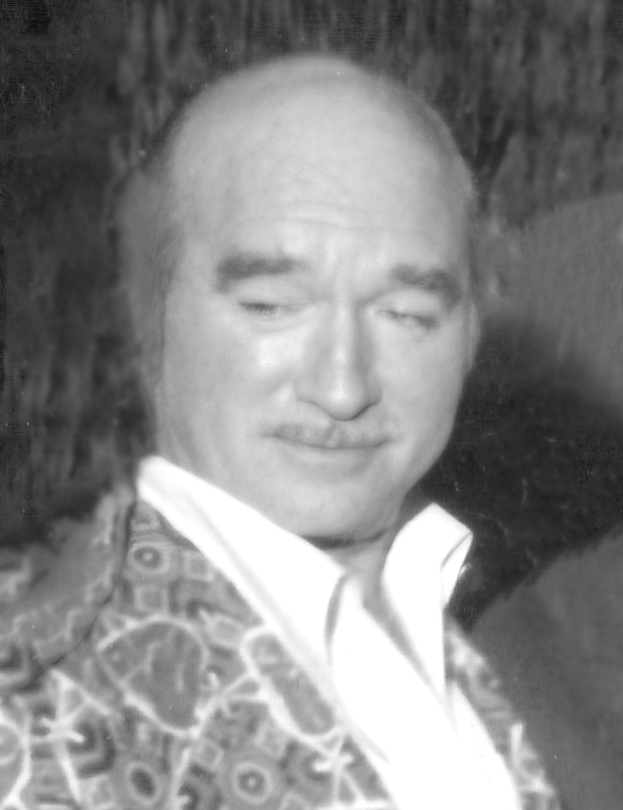
- Barclay in 1975
- Born: Édouard Ruault; 26 January 1921; Paris, France
- Died: 13 May 2005 (aged 84); Boulogne-Billancourt, Île-de-France, France
- Occupation: Record producer

Édouard Ruault (French pronunciation: [edwaʁ ʁɥo]; 26 January 1921 – 13 May 2005), better known as Eddie Barclay, was a French record producer. Singers under him included Jacques Brel, Dalida and Charles Aznavour. He founded the record label Barclay.

== Life ==
Ruault, the son of a café waiter and a post office worker, was born in Paris on January 26, 1921. He spent much of his early childhood with his grandmother in Taverny (in today's Val-d'Oise). His parents bought the Café de la Poste bar in the middle of Paris while he was a child and at the age of 15 he left school to work in the café. He had not enjoyed his studies but he taught himself music and piano. He particularly liked American jazz and embraced the music of Fats Waller. He often visited the Hot Club de France to hear the quintet of Stéphane Grappelli and Django Reinhardt.

He became a pianist at "L'Étape" club in rue Godot-de-Mauroy, Paris, where his half-hour sets alternated with the young Louis de Funès, also at the start of his career. When the German occupiers of France banned jazz, he held regular social gatherings with other zazous at his home to listen to jazz records and illegal radio stations. Pierre-Louis Guérin employed him as a pianist at Guérin's first nightclub, "Le Club".

After the war, Eduard Ruault changed his name to Eddie Barclay and opened "Eddie's Club" in Paris. In 1947 he started a band which featured his wife, Nicole, on vocals under the name Eve Williams. Barclay and his wife started "Blue Star Records", using their apartment to store 78 rpm discs, with Barclay delivering them himself. Musicians on the label included Don Byas and Eddie Constantine. Barclay wrote songs with Charles Aznavour and Boris Vian, and with Vian he edited Jazz magazine.

In 1952 Alan Morrison, a visitor to Barclay's club, had invited him to visit the US to see the new recording technology that enabled the production of 45s and LPs. In 1955 Barclay agreed to manufacture and distribute Mercury Records in Europe. He took 60 masters to Pathé-Marconi's Paris factory and began promoting the new microgroove format to the French market. As well as releasing US records by the likes of Ray Charles, Dizzy Gillespie, Sammy Davis Jr. and Duke Ellington, Barclay engaged Gerhard Lehner, a German sound engineer, to make original recordings in Avenue Hoche, Paris. After selling 1.5 million copies of the Platters' "Only You", Barclay Records rose to become the top music production company in France. His success led to his nickname as "empereur du microsillon" (king of microgroove).

His francophone discoveries included the singers Hugues Aufray, Michel Delpech, Dalida (whom he launched in 1956), Mireille Mathieu, Claude Nougaro, and Eddy Mitchell. His artistes delighted in the artistic freedom that he afforded them, and in the trust that he placed in their judgement.

Aznavour joined the Barclay stable in 1956 even though they had been friends for over a decade by that time. They collaborated on some songwriting including Quand tu m'embrasses (When You Hold Me). Jacques Brel, the Belgian poet-singer who stayed with Barclay until his death in 1978, began his long association with Barclay in 1962, recording hits including "Le plat Pays" (The Flat Country), and "Les Bigotes" (The Holier-than-Thous) on the Barclay label. Brel left Philips Records to join Barclay as did Juliette Gréco. Philips threatened to litigate but the matter was settled out of court and Barclay released Johnny Hallyday to Philips as part of the settlement. Anarchist poet Léo Ferré was another established singer-songwriter who joined Barclay Records to great mutual benefit.

Barclay's nose for success was not infallible, however. He refused to sign Bob Marley, ended his collaboration with Pierre Perret and dropped Michel Sardou, four years after discovering him, by telling him "My little old fellow, write songs if you want, but especially do not sing them. You do not have any talent!"

At the beginning of the eighties, recovering from cancer of the throat, which had been diagnosed in 1979, he sold 80% of his label to PolyGram, and retired to Saint-Tropez, where he had spent 25 years building a house called Maison du Cap, Ramatuelle, since Brigitte Bardot persuaded him to buy land there in the late 1950s. His trademark was a white suit, and his Saint-Tropez parties at which all the guests wore white became huge events for the French media. He emerged briefly from retirement with a new record label but it was not the success he wished. The house was bought by Amanda Eliasch and Johan Eliasch and is now owned by Johan Eliasch alone.

In March 1994 Barclay underwent quadruple bypass surgery after a heart attack. On April 29, 2005 he was admitted to the Ambroise-Paré hospital in Paris with urinary and pulmonary infections. He died there during the night of May 12, 2005 and was pronounced dead in the morning. He has one son, Guillaume, from his third marriage to Marie-Christine Steinberg.

== Works ==
Barclay transcribed and interpreted early jazz numbers. He co-wrote the songs Quand tu m'embrasses with Charles Aznavour, and Le rock de Monsieur Failair with Boris Vian.

He wrote the original soundtracks for several films, including Bob le flambeur (1955, English title: Bob the Gambler; one translation is "Bob the high roller") directed by Jean-Pierre Melville.

In 1988 he published his autobiography.

== Wives ==
Barclay was notorious for his many wives to the extent that some journalists referred to him as 'Bluebeard'. At one of his later weddings, the officiating mayor of Neuilly said: "Ah, good day, Monsieur Barclay, what a pleasure to see you yet again." His nine wives were:

- Michele (2 years) married in 1945
- Nicole (14 years), jazz singer under the name of Eve Williams
- Marie-Christine (4 years)
- Béatrice (1.5 years) - she subsequently married Guy Marchand
- Michele (briefly)
- Danielle Mauroy (1 year)
- Cathy (3 years)
- Caroline (11 years) married in 1988
- Tiara, married in June 2002 on the island of Moorea.

== See also ==
- Dalida
- Every Day Has Its Secret (1958, film)

== Other sources ==
- Associated Press release 12:34 May 14, 2005.
- Sleeve notes, Charles Aznavour: Je M'Voyais Deja CD (EMI, 1995).
- Barclay, Eddie. Que la Fête Continue (Paris: Robert Laffont, 1988)
- O'Connor, Patrick. 'Obituary: Eddie Barclay', The Guardian, May 16, 2005
