= Barclay (record label) =

French record label

- Parent company: Universal Music Group
- Founded: 1953; 72 years ago
- Founder: Eddie Barclay
- Distributor: Universal
- Genre: Various
- Country of origin: France
- Location: Paris
- Official website: Barclay on Facebook

Barclay is a French Universal Music Group record label, originally owned by Eddie Barclay in 1953. Barclay previously established Riviera-LM Records in 1951.

Eddie was a bandleader, pianist, producer and nightclub owner. With his wife and vocalist, Nicole, he started a record company. It published the work of Stéphane Grappelli, Lionel Hampton and Rhoda Scott, among others. In 1978, he sold 40% to PolyGram Records. Jazz issues ceased in 1983.

Barclay's catalogue includes the works of Hugues Aufray, Charles Aznavour, Alain Bashung, Jacques Brel, Bertrand Cantat, Les Chaussettes Noires, Dalida, Jean Ferrat, Léo Ferré, Nino Ferrer, Jimi Hendrix, Patrick Juvet, Fela Kuti, Femi Kuti, Danielle Licari, Mireille Mathieu, Mika, Eddy Mitchell, Modjo, Erik Montry, Noir Désir, Paradis, Henri Salvador, Emilie Simon, Rachid Taha and the Wild Magnolias.

== See also ==
- List of record labels
