= Lartiste discography =

Lartiste albums discography
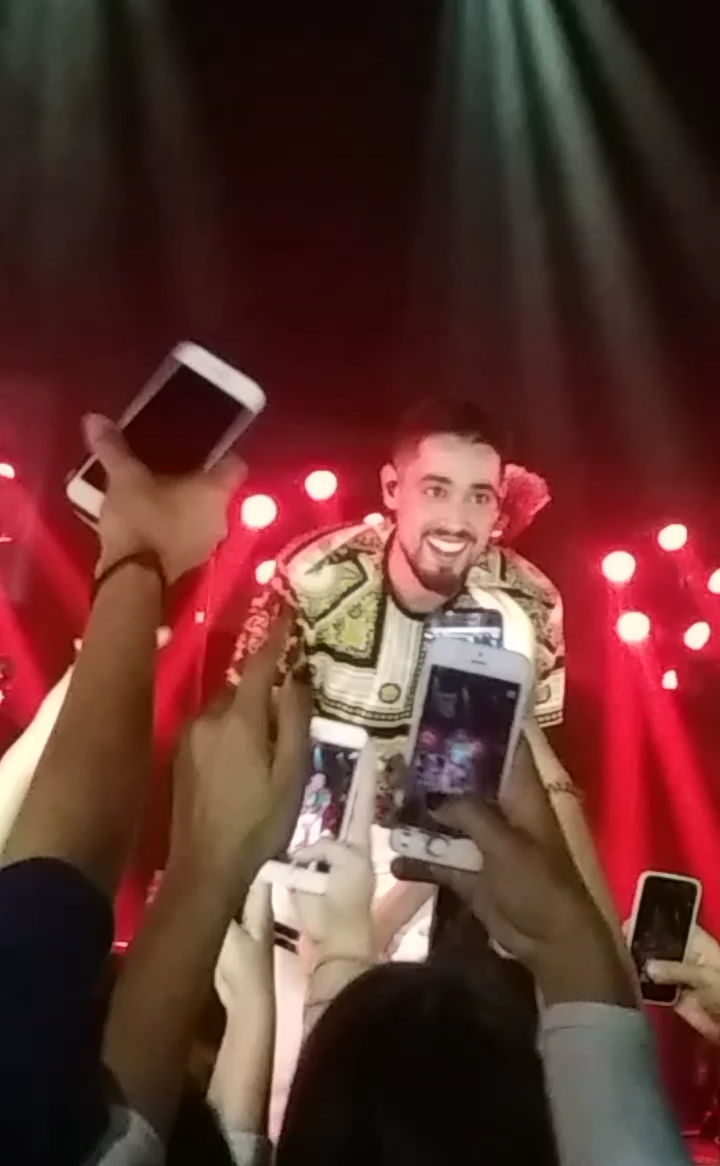
- Lartiste performing in Grenoble during the Clandestino Tour in 2017.
- Studio albums: 6
- Singles: 10
- Singles as featured artist: 12
- Other charted songs: 19

French-Moroccan singer and rapper Lartiste has released six studio albums.

== Albums ==
| Year | Album | Peak positions | | Notes |
| Year | Album | FRA | BEL (Wa) | Notes |
|---|---|---|---|---|
| 2013 | Lalbum | — | — | No. / Title / Length; 1. / "Étincelle" / 4:08; 2. / "J'bénis le mic" / 4:38; 3. / "Mévader" / 3:56; 4. / "Toi et moi ce soir (Liouma)" / 3:18; 5. / "Toucher le ciel" / 4:06; 6. / "Tendre la main" / 4:36; 7. / "Baby Love" / 3:35; 8. / "Hello" / 3:58; 9. / "Africa 2.0" (feat. Ayano) / 3:16; 10. / "International" / 4:15; 11. / "Cool" / 4:42; 12. / "Rockstar" / 3:45; 13. / "Le poids de mes erreurs" / 3:16; 14. / "Post-scriptum" / 4:21 |
| 2015 | Fenomeno | 14 | 102 | No. / Title / Length; 1. / "A bon entendeur" / 4:04; 2. / "Donde Cuando" / 3:23; 3. / "Trop de flow" (feat. Clayton Hamilton) / 3:34; 4. / "Destination finale" / 3:33; 5. / "Polygame" (feat. Dr. Beriz) / 3:08; 6. / "Bang Bang" / 3:17; 7. / "Fenomeno" / 2:58; 8. / "Jamais abandonner" / 3:06; 9. / "L'héritier" (feat. Rim'K) / 4:13; 10. / "Pay Me" / 3:43; 11. / "Pas pousser" / 3:28; 12. / "Lampedusa" (feat. Double M) / 4:10; 13. / "Hypocrite" / 3:59; 14. / "Fais le" / 2:38 |
| 2016 | Maestro | 4 | 13 | No. / Title / Length; 1. / "Étincelle" / 4:08; 2. / "J'bénis le mic" / 4:38; 3. / "Mévader" / 3:56; 4. / "Toi et moi ce soir (Liouma)" / 3:18; 5. / "Toucher le ciel" / 4:06; 6. / "Tendre la main" / 4:36; 7. / "Baby Love" / 3:35; 8. / "Hello" / 3:58; 9. / "Africa 2.0" (feat. Ayano) / 3:16; 10. / "International" / 4:15; 11. / "Cool" / 4:42; 12. / "Rockstar" / 3:45; 13. / "Le poids de mes erreurs" / 3:16; 14. / "Post-scriptum" / 4:21 |
| 2016 | Clandestino | 24 | 59 | No. / Title / Length; 1. / "Intro" / 2:37; 2. / "Joker" / 3:31; 3. / "Soleil" / 2:50; 4. / "Dark Vador" / 3:35; 5. / "Le Gouffre" / 3:43; 6. / "Le Moral" (featuring Kazmi) / 3:48; 7. / "Chocolat" (featuring Awa Imani); 8. / "Clandestina" / 3:56; 9. / "Bye Bye Baby" / 2:47; 10. / "Liaisons Dangereuses" / 3:50; 11. / "Tony Montana" / 2:47; 12. / "Gonzales" (featuring 7liwa) / 4:09; 13. / "Echec et M.A.T" (featuring Kamelenouvo & Gianni) / 3:36; 14. / "Subito" / 3:40; 15. / "Lifat Mat" / 3:05; 16. / "Chauffeur Capable" (featuring 7Liwa, The Wind & Laguardia) / 3:25; 17. / "Vue du ciel" / 3:13 |
| 2018 | Grandestino | 6 | 18 | |
| 2019 | Quartier Latin Vol.1 | 7 | 30 | |

Others

- 2006: "Évasion" (maxi)
- 2010: Rap 1.9 (mixtape)
- 2017: Projet 000

== Singles ==
=== As lead artist ===
| Year | Single | Peak positions | | | | Album |
| Year | Single | FRA | BEL (Wa) | MENA | SWI | Album |
|---|---|---|---|---|---|---|
| 2012 | "Toi et moi ce soir (Liouma)" | 145 | — | * | — | Lalbum |
| 2012 | "Mévader" | — | — | * | — | Lalbum |
| 2016 | "Maestro" | 59 | — | * | — | Maestro |
| 2016 | "Clandestina" | 59 | — | * | — | Clandestino |
| 2016 | "Chocolat" (feat. Awa Imani) | 3 | 13 | * | 75 | Clandestino |
| 2017 | "Pardonner" | 176 | — | * | — | Non-album single |
| 2017 | "Catchu Catchu" | 11 | 26 | * | — | Grandestino |
| 2018 | "Vai et viens" | 4 | 2* (Ultratip) | * | — | Grandestino |
| 2018 | "Mafiosa" (feat. Caroliina) | 1 | 6 | * | 38 | Grandestino |
| 2019 | "Peligrosa" (feat. Karol G) | 94 | — | * | — | Quartier Latin Vol. 1 |
| 2023 | "Zarzour" | — | — | 2 | — | Non-album single |
"*" denotes the chart did not exist at that time.

*Did not appear in the official Belgian Ultratop 50 charts, but rather in the bubbling under Ultratip charts.

=== As featured artist ===
| Year | Title | Peak positions | | Album |
| Year | Title | FRA | BEL (Wa) | Album |
|---|---|---|---|---|
| 2014 | "Déconnectés" (DJ Hamida featuring Kayna Samet, Rim'K and Lartiste) | 14 | 7* (Ultratip) | À la bien mix party 2014 |
| 2014 | "Trabendo Musical" (DJ Hamida featuring Lartiste & Kader Japonais) | 149 | — | À la bien mix party 2014 |
| 2015 | "Miss Vilaine" (DJ Hamida featuring Lartiste, Leck and Big Ali) | 194 | — | Non-album singles |
| 2015 | "Insta" (La Fouine featuring Lartiste) | 36 | 24* (Ultratip) | Non-album singles |
| 2016 | "Vida loca" (Rim'K featuring Lartiste) | 146 | — | Monster Tape |
| 2017 | "Laisse nous passer" (DJ Babs featuring Lartiste) | 187 | — | Non-album singles |
| 2017 | "Grand Paris" (Médine featuring Lartiste, Lino, Sofiane, Alivor, Seth Gueko, Ninho and Youssoupha) | 48 | — | Non-album singles |
| 2017 | "Mama nostra" (Rim'k featuring Lartiste) | 183 | — | Fantôme |
| 2017 | "C'est une frappe" (DJ Hamida featuring Lartiste) | 86 | 12* (Ultratip) | À la bien mix party 2017 |
| 2017 | "Dalé" (Alonzo featuring Lartiste) | 69 | — | 100% |
| 2018 | "Ciao bella" (DJ Hamida featuring Lartiste) | 48 | — | À la bien mix party 2018 |
| 2019 | "On Fleek" (Eva featuring Lartiste) | 1 | 26 | Non-album single |

*Did not appear in the official Belgian Ultratop 50 charts, but rather in the bubbling under Ultratip charts.

== Other charted songs ==
| Year | Title | Peak positions | Album |
| Year | Title | FRA | Album |
|---|---|---|---|
| 2015 | "Destination Finale" | 153 | Fenomeno |
| 2015 | "Polygame" (featuring Dr. Beriz) | 196 | Fenomeno |
| 2015 | "Bang Bang" | 144 | Fenomeno |
| 2015 | "Destination Finale" | 153 | Non-album song |
| 2016 | "Trop de flow" (feat. Clayton Hamilton) | 154 | Maestro |
| 2016 | "Missile" | 106 | Maestro |
| 2016 | "Amour parano" | 109 | Maestro |
| 2016 | "J'arrive pas" (feat. Lefa) | 110 | Maestro |
| 2016 | "Combien tu t'appelles?" | 183 | Maestro |
| 2016 | "Soleil" | 158 | Clandestino |
| 2016 | "Liaisons dangereuses" | 102 | Clandestino |
| 2016 | "Bye Bye Baby" | 154 | Clandestino |
| 2018 | "GB" (featuring Kaaris and DJ Mc Fly) | 62 | Grandestino |
| 2018 | "Bête blessée" | 185 | Grandestino |
| 2018 | "Grandestino" | 175 | Grandestino |
| 2018 | "Neymar" (featuring Gradur) | 186 | Grandestino |
| 2018 | "Attache ta ceinture" (featuring Naza) | 75 | Taxi 5 (soundtrack) |
| 2018 | "Pas le choix" (with Sofiane and Kaaris) | 90 | 93 Empire |
| 2018 | "Dinero" (with Da Uzi and Don Milli) | 143 | 93 Empire |

*Did not appear in the official Belgian Ultratop 50 charts, but rather in the bubbling under Ultratip charts.
