= À La Bien Mix Party =

Compilation album series by DJ Hamida

À La Bien Mix Party (French pronunciation: [a la bjɛ̃]; meaning "quietly") is a compilation series by DJ Hamida mixing various acts but mainly from North Africa and other African acts in various genres of music, promoting what he calls "Meknessi Style".

The 2014 edition of the series, so far the most successful of the series, reached number 10 on SNEP, the official French Albums Chart, also charting in Belgium's Ultratop chart, with "Déconnectés" becoming the official debut release from the album. Five tracks from the album À la bien mix party have made it to the French SNEP Top 200 Singles Chart. DJ Hamida also engaged in a tour in support of the album release.

== À la bien mix party 2011 ==
- Full title: DJ Hamida presente À la bien mix party 2011
- Tracks: 43
- Date released: June 2011
- Record label: DJ Hamida

| Track # | Song title | Credits / Featuring | Length |
|---|---|---|---|
| 1. | "Introduction À la bien mix party 2011" | DJ Hamida | 2:37 |
| 2. | "Dossier Classe" | DJ Hamida & L'Algérino feat Kader Japonais | 2:39 |
| 3. | "Reggada Party 2011" | DJ Hamida & Hanini | 2:28 |
| 4. | "100% Nebghik" | DJ Hamida & Cheb Rayan | 2:05 |
| 5. | "Chouf" | DJ Hamida & Rim'k feat. Sahraoui | 1:52 |
| 6. | "Kower Kower" | DJ Hamida & Cheikh Zmagri | 3:11 |
| 7. | "Dana Dayni" | DJ Hamida & Cheba Zahounia feat L.E.C.K & Am1 | 2:55 |
| 8. | "O Mama Mia" | DJ Hamida & Cheba Maria feat. Kalsha & Klams | 2:34 |
| 9. | "Lala Fatima" | DJ Hamida & Mohamed Lamine feat Ogb | 2:43 |
| 10. | "Char Bouleh (Classique)" | DJ Hamida & Cheba Zahounia | 1:35 |
| 11. | "Session Chaabi Ould Hami" | DJ Hamida & DJ Amine | 1:27 |
| 12. | "1 2 3" | DJ Hamida & DJ Amine | 1:31 |
| 13. | "Dahka Marrakchia" | DJ Hamida & DJ Amine | 0:32 |
| 14. | "Li Brah" | DJ Hamida & DJ Amine | 0:29 |
| 15. | "Nayda" | DJ Hamida & DJ Amine | 0:53 |
| 16. | "Sbah El Khir" | DJ Hamida & DJ Amine | 0:39 |
| 17. | "Halla Halla vs Kuduro Belly Dance (DJ Hamida Rmx)" | DJ Hamida & Soprano | 2:42 |
| 18. | "Ante Up (House Rmx)" | DJ Hamida & Busta Rhytmes feat. Mop | 1:35 |
| 19. | "Walking On the Val 2 Marne" | DJ Hamida & Kris Menace feat. Rohff | 2:03 |
| 20. | "Les Mains du L'air (Inédit Rmx)" | DJ Hamida & Lartiste feat. Imran Khan | 2:45 |
| 21. | "Vazi" | DJ Hamida & Blaz feat. Afaf | 1:59 |
| 22. | "Cheri Coco" | DJ Hamida & Magic System feat. Soprano | 2:31 |
| 23. | "Ajini Goud" | DJ Hamida & Sabah | 2:09 |
| 24. | "Habibi" | DJ Hamida & Cheb Simo | 1:13 |
| 25. | "I Need Dollar" | DJ Hamida & Aloe Blacc | 1:26 |
| 26. | "I’m in Morroco [sic] Beach" | DJ Hamida vs Dirty Dutch Music | 2:00 |
| 27. | "On the Floor" | DJ Hamida & Jennifer Lopez feat Pitbull | 2:26 |
| 28. | "Un indien dans Virty" | DJ Hamida & Imran Khan feat. Leck | 2:01 |
| 29. | "One" | DJ Hamida & DJ R – Wan Et Stik-E | 1:30 |
| 30. | "Ain Zoura" | DJ Hamida & Cheb Amir | 1:20 |
| 31. | "Moment 4 Life" | DJ Hamida & Nicki Minaj | 1:37 |
| 32. | "Bienvenue au Maroc" | DJ Hamida & Kalsha feat. Jalal Hamdaoui | 3:34 |
| 33. | "Les ptis de chez moi y" | DJ Hamida & Mister You feat Cheba Djamila | 2:07 |
| 34. | "Excuce moi" | DJ Hamida & Rohff feat. Ryan Leslie & Kery Hilson | 1:25 |
| 35. | "Kush" | DJ Hamida & Francisco | 1:45 |
| 36. | "Buzzin" | DJ Hamida & California feat. 50 Cent | 2:14 |
| 37. | "Comme si comme sa" | DJ Hamida & Cheb Amir | 1:55 |
| 38. | "Ca Swing" | DJ Hamida & Blaz | 2:08 |
| 39. | "Ach Sabarni" | DJ Hamida & Rachid Kasmi feat. Kalsha | 2:08 |
| 40. | "Amplifier Darwa" | DJ Hamida & Imran Khan feat. Mister You | 2:11 |
| 41. | "Miss Fatty" | DJ Hamida & Million Stylez | 1:15 |
| 42. | "À la bien mix party" | DJ Hamida & Cheb Khalass feat Gsx | 3:08 |
| 43. | "Black And Yellow (Rmx)" | DJ Hamida & T – Pain | 1:30 |

== À la bien mix party 2012 ==
- Tracks: 37
- Date released: 24 June 2012
- Record label: Dj Hamida

| Track # | Song title | Credits / Featuring | Length |
|---|---|---|---|
| 1. | "Intro" | DJ Hamida | 3:06 |
| 2. | "Chebba" | DJ Hamida & Kalsha feat. Nordine | 1:59 |
| 3. | "Alaoui vs Khalass" | DJ Hamida | 0:49 |
| 4. | "El Babor" | DJ Hamida feat. Cheb Rayan | 1:09 |
| 5. | "No Easy (Remix)" | DJ Hamida & El Matador feat. P Square | 1:18 |
| 6. | "Lahbiba" | DJ Hamida feat. Jalal Hamdaoui | 2:21 |
| 7. | "Kechmara" | DJ Hamida & L'Algérino feat. Jalal Hamdaoui | 2:46 |
| 8. | "Les vacances" | DJ Hamida & Lalime feat. Cheb Zoubir | 2:04 |
| 9. | "Gouli la la la" | DJ Hamida & Don Erback feat. Amir | 2:23 |
| 10. | "African Airlines" | DJ Hamida & Mansly W feat. Leck | 2:40 |
| 11. | "Single Night" | DJ Hamida, Wayna K & Tanya Michelle feat. Kalsha | 2:10 |
| 12. | "Pour les ptites sœurs" | DJ Hamida & Blaz feat. Kynssea | 2:02 |
| 13. | "Hella hella" | DJ Hamida & Larmes Authentik feat. Nassi | 2:17 |
| 14. | "Lilla n'dirou hella" | DJ Hamida, Fianso & BR feat. Chebba Maria | 2:09 |
| 15. | "Ya lala" | DJ Hamida & Leck feat. Jalal Hamdaoui | 2:01 |
| 16. | "Party 93" | DJ Hamida & RR feat. Wayna K | 2:07 |
| 17. | "Ntia Ntia" | DJ Hamida & Canardo feat. Cheb Rayan | 2:56 |
| 18. | "Old School Brother (Remix)" | DJ Hamida & Enois Scroggins feat. Jalal Hamdaoui | 1:27 |
| 19. | "Bayna" | DJ Hamida & L'Algérino feat. Nassi | 1:21 |
| 20. | "Inas Inas (Funky Remix)" | DJ Hamida feat. Mohamed Rouicha | 2:37 |
| 21. | "Achbidi Naamal (Chaabi Remix)" | DJ Hamida feat. Leck | 1:30 |
| 22. | "Let's the Chaabi Kick" | DJ Hamida | 2:23 |
| 23. | "On fais les bails" | DJ Hamida & Harone feat. Lartiste | 2:28 |
| 24. | "Pego Pego (Remix)" | DJ Hamida | 0:43 |
| 25. | "Wesh hada" | DJ Hamida feat. Hassan Touil | 2:25 |
| 26. | "Sa3a Sa3ida (House Remix)" | DJ Hamida & Saad Lamjarred feat. Sofia Mountassir | 2:25 |
| 27. | "Sa3a Sa3ida (House Remix)" | DJ Hamida feat. Wayna K | 2:38 |
| 28. | "DJ Hamida Hendeka" | DJ Hamida | 1:05 |
| 29. | "Alabina (House Remix)" | DJ Hamida feat. Big Ali | 2:03 |
| 31. | "Sahbi Sahbi" | DJ Hamida | 1:33 |
| 32. | "Velocidade 6" | DJ Hamida feat. Mulher Melancia | 0:55 |
| 33. | "DJ H Harbouch Remix" | DJ Hamida | 0:46 |
| 34. | "Madrite Had Papicha" | DJ Hamida feat. Fouaz La Classe | 1:52 |
| 35. | "Bienvenue en Tunisie" | DJ Hamida feat. Ouled Jouini | 1:00 |
| 36. | "Don't forget le padre du game" | DJ Hamida feat. Yassmin & Rohff | 3:04 |
| 37. | "Bienvenue dans ma houma" | DJ Hamida & Oriental Impact feat. Leck | 3:23 |

== À la bien mix party 2013 ==
  - Full title: DJ Hamida presente À la bien mix party 2013
- Tracks: 32
- Date released: 12 July 2013
- Record label: Meknessityle

| Track # | Song title | Credits / Featuring | Length |
|---|---|---|---|
| 1. | "Introduction DJ Hamida à la bien mix party 2013" | DJ Hamida | 2:54 |
| 2. | "Goulou goulou" | DJ Hamida feat. Cheb Rayan | 2:51 |
| 3. | "Dj zid el volume" | DJ Hamida feat. Cheb Khalass | 2:15 |
| 4. | "Style jdid" | DJ Hamida feat. 2s | 2:08 |
| 5. | "Paris Marrakech" | DJ Hamida feat. Lartiste | 3:04 |
| 6. | "Darwa" | DJ Hamida feat. Demon One & Hass'n | 2:46 |
| 7. | "Allo" | DJ Hamida | 2:57 |
| 8. | "Lila Lila" | DJ Hamida feat. Chebba Maria | 2:27 |
| 9. | "Yal Meknessi" | DJ Hamida feat. Ya'seen | 2:11 |
| 10. | "Hamida One One One" | DJ Hamida feat. Cheb Rayan | 1:56 |
| 11. | "Attend j'arrive" | DJ Hamida | 1:53 |
| 12. | "Beauté fatale" | DJ Hamida feat. Najim | 2:23 |
| 13. | "Jme sert un re-ve" | DJ Hamida | 2:24 |
| 14. | "Fianso" | DJ Hamida feat. Hass'n | 1:37 |
| 15. | "Casablanca" | DJ Hamida feat. Harone | 2:57 |
| 16. | "Remmetez" | DJ Hamida | 2:02 |
| 17. | "Allure" | DJ Hamida | 1:35 |
| 18. | "I Wanna Be" | DJ Hamida | 2:49 |
| 19. | "Wech dani" | DJ Hamida | 2:20 |
| 20. | "Hada zman izagan" | DJ Hamida | 1:14 |
| 21. | "Mamamia" | DJ Hamida | 1:36 |
| 22. | "Meknessi Style Shake" | DJ Hamida | 1:33 |
| 23. | "Guantanamera" | DJ Hamida | 1:45 |
| 24. | "Bye bye" | DJ Hamida | 1:16 |
| 25. | "Awra ya wa" | DJ Hamida | 2:27 |
| 26. | "Agachate" | DJ Hamida | 1:13 |
| 27. | "Dima roubla" | DJ Hamida feat. 2s | 3:03 |
| 28. | "Besoin de vivre" | DJ Hamida | 2:42 |
| 29. | "On est la" | DJ Hamida feat. TLF & Harone | 3:29 |
| 30. | "Satisfy" | DJ Hamida | 2:38 |
| 31. | "Ana Maghrabi" | DJ Hamida feat. Douzi | 3:04 |
| 32. | "Ou est ma wife" | DJ Hamida feat. Cheb Rayan | 4:12 |

== À la bien mix party 2014 ==
- Tracks: 30
- Date released: 2 June 2014
- Record label: SIX-O-NINE / MUSICAST
- Charts

| Year | Album | Peak positions | |
| Year | Album | FR | BEL (Wa) |
|---|---|---|---|
| 2014 | À la bien Mix Party 2014 | 10 | 76 |

- Charting singles from the album

| Year | Single | Peak positions | | Credits on album À la bien Mix Party 2014 | Album |
| Year | Single | FR | BEL (Wa) | Credits on album À la bien Mix Party 2014 | Album |
|---|---|---|---|---|---|
| 2014 | "Déconnectés" | 14 | 29 (Ultratip) | feat. Kayna Samet, Rim-K & L'Artiste | À la bien Mix Party 2014 |
| 2014 | "Ana liouma" (feat. Mister You & Al Bandit) | 142 | – | (feat. Mister You & Al Bandit | À la bien Mix Party 2014 |
| 2014 | "Intro Numero Uno" | 149 | – | – | À la bien Mix Party 2014 |
| 2014 | "Trabendo musical" | 149 | – | feat. L'Artiste & Kader Japonais | À la bien Mix Party 2014 |
| 2014 | "Wesh pelo" | 158 | – | feat. Leck & Laly Rai | À la bien Mix Party 2014 |

| Track # | Song title | Credits / Featuring | Length |
|---|---|---|---|
| 1. | "Intro "Numero Uno" | DJ Hamida | 3:10 |
| 2. | "Wesh pelo" | DJ Hamida feat. Leck & Laly Rai | 2:58 |
| 3. | "N'Brik N'Brik" | DJ Hamida feat. Cheb Rayan & RJ | 2:16 |
| 4. | "Hadi ma vie" | DJ Hamida feat. Oriental Impact & Cheba Maria | 2:40 |
| 5. | "00212" | DJ Hamida feat. Kalsha & Harone | 3:12 |
| 6. | "Bledna" | DJ Hamida feat. LEAK & Wayna K | 2:28 |
| 7. | "Ana liouma" | DJ Hamida feat. Mister You & Al Bandit | 2:32 |
| 8. | "Bienvenue chez les Tounsi" | DJ Hamida feat. Tunisiano & Ramzi Abdelwaheb | 2:32 |
| 9. | "Tonight" | DJ Hamida feat. GSX | 2:40 |
| 10. | "Tranquille la Life" | DJ Hamida feat. Zifou | 2:59 |
| 11. | "Machakil" | DJ Hamida feat. Fianso & Yaseen | 2:01 |
| 12. | "Retour aux sources" | DJ Hamida feat. Najim & Djazzi | 3:19 |
| 13. | "Ce soir je m'ambiance" | DJ Hamida feat. Blaz | 2:13 |
| 14. | "J'ai plus de crédit" | DJ Hamida feat. Canardo | 2:04 |
| 15. | "Elle s'est fait belle" | DJ Hamida feat. Lalime & Cheb Zoubir | 2:16 |
| 16. | "Anda madgoul" | DJ Hamida feat. Jalal Hamdaoui | 2:36 |
| 17. | "Mec de la Night" | DJ Hamida feat. Sinik & Soso Maness | 2:22 |
| 18. | "Aie aie aie" | DJ Hamida feat. Dakka Marrakchia Tiw Tiw | 2:10 |
| 19. | "Vamos" | DJ Hamida feat. L'Artiste & Francisco | 2:32 |
| 20. | "Ach dani lik" | DJ Hamida feat. Senhaji & Mustafa Bourgogne | 2:37 |
| 21. | "Trabendo musical" | DJ Hamida feat. L'Artiste & Kader Japonais | 2:37 |
| 22. | "Vida loca" | DJ Hamida feat. Lartiste | 1:52 |
| 23. | "Mahboul" | DJ Hamida feat. Hamidou, Leck, Mansly, W & Fresh | 2:47 |
| 24. | "La danse des épaules" | DJ Hamida feat. Mouss Maher | 1:47 |
| 25. | "Enfin" | DJ Hamida feat. Daoudi | 2:20 |
| 26. | "Dangerous" | DJ Hamida feat. L'Artiste | 2:00 |
| 27. | "Déconnectés" | DJ Hamida feat. Kayna Samet, Rim-K & L'Artiste | 2:41 |
| 28. | "La guerre des bouteilles" | DJ Hamida feat. Leck | 1:58 |
| 28. | "Champs Elysées" | DJ Hamida feat. Kamelenouvo | 2:39 |
| 28. | "Outro" | DJ Hamida feat. Youssef El Arabi | 0:35 |

== Mix party 2015 ==
- Also known as DJ Hamida Mix party 2015
- Tracks: 34
- Date released: 25 May 2014
- Record label: Definite Pop
- Charts

| Year | Album | Peak position |
| Year | Album | BEL (Wa) |
|---|---|---|
| 2015 | DJ Hamida Mix Party 2015 | 40 |

- Charting singles from the album

| Year | Single | Peak positions | | Credits on album À la bien Mix Party 2014 | Album |
| Year | Single | FR | BEL (Wa) | Credits on album À la bien Mix Party 2014 | Album |
|---|---|---|---|---|---|
| 2015 | "Mehlia (C'est fini)" | 136 | – | DJ Hamida feat. Rim'K & Kayna Samet | Mix Party 2015 |

| Track # | Song title | Credits / Featuring | Length |
|---|---|---|---|
| 1. | "Intro Mix Party 2015" | DJ Hamida | 3:18 |
| 2. | "Je danse quand même" | Leck | 2:44 |
| 3. | "Samedi soir" | L.E.A.K | 2:41 |
| 4. | "Wati Bruxelles" | Red Cross | 2:19 |
| 5. | "À ma santé" | Sultan feat. Charly Bell | 2:58 |
| 6. | "Ya delali" | Canardo feat. Wayna K | 2:08 |
| 7. | "Beverly Hills" | Six feat. Francisco | 2:08 |
| 8. | "Ya zina" | W feat. Ya'seen | 1:51 |
| 9. | "Mehlia (C'est fini)" | DJ Hamida feat. Rim'K & Kayna Samet | 2:31 |
| 10. | "Dayza" | Kamikaz feat. Alae | 2:38 |
| 11. | "Tout jdid" | Sianna feat. Many | 2:38 |
| 12. | "Speed" | Kevlar | 2:07 |
| 13. | "Face à face" | Biwai feat. Najim | 2:06 |
| 14. | "On fait comment" | Blaz feat. Aynine | 2:30 |
| 15. | "Love 2 Love" | Mister You feat. Cheba Maria | 2:21 |
| 16. | "Numéro uno" | James Izmad feat. Anis Le Kiss | 1:51 |
| 17. | "Miss Vilaine" | Lartiste feat. Leck & Big Ali | 2:20 |
| 18. | "Toute la night" | Kalsha feat. Bimbim & Yasmin | 2:46 |
| 19. | "Ki nchoufek" | Oriental Impact feat. Aymane Serhani | 2:03 |
| 20. | "Zine kouani" | Sabah | 1:52 |
| 21. | "Bon délire" | El Matador | 2:40 |
| 22. | "Celebrate" | Yasmin feat. Mike Lucazz & Cheb Amir | 2:20 |
| 23. | "Paname" | DJ Hamida feat. Cam'Ro | 2:39 |
| 24. | "À demi mot" | Leck feat. Clayton Hamilton | 2:04 |
| 25. | "L'été ça va vite" | Biwai | 1:21 |
| 26. | "Mobylette" | Jorell feat. Mokobé | 2:10 |
| 27. | "Chaabi Mix Party" | Tiiw Tiiw | 1:00 |
| 28. | "Venez danser" | MN Du 71 | 2:57 |
| 29. | "Attrape moi si tu peux" | Dry feat. Charly Bell | 2:09 |
| 30. | "Salut la France" | Kalsha feat. Younes Depardieu | 2:06 |
| 31. | "La danse des épaules Part. 2" | Hanino | 1:43 |
| 32. | "Wifi Walou" | Cheikh Redson feat. Larog | 2:51 |
| 33. | "Faut les lovés" | Niro | 1:53 |
| 34. | "System DV" | H-Kayne | 3:20 |

== Mix party 2016 ==
- Also known as DJ Hamida Mix party 2016
- Tracks: 34
- Date released: 25 May 2014
- Record label: Definite Pop
- Charts

| Year | Album | Peak positions | | |
| Year | Album | FR | BEL (Wa) | BEL (Vl) |
|---|---|---|---|---|
| 2016 | DJ Hamida Mix Party 2016 | 6 | 23 | 166 |

| Track # | Song title | Credits / Featuring | Length |
|---|---|---|---|
| 1. | "Introduction Mix Party 2016" | DJ Hamida | 3:42 |
| 2. | "Prestige" | Vitaa feat. TLF | 3:29 |
| 3. | "Jaloux" | Mister You feat. Reda Taliani & Kalsha | 3:03 |
| 4. | "Delali" | Blaz feat. Cheb Amir | 1:56 |
| 5. | "Tout casser" | Sultan | 2:43 |
| 6. | "Marbella" | Al Bandit | 2:04 |
| 7. | "On connaît le DJ" | Kamelenuovo | 2:06 |
| 8. | "L'argent n'aime pas les gens" | Lefa feat. Barack Adama | 2:39 |
| 9. | "Wa3ra" | Appa feat. Cheb Amir | 2:39 |
| 10. | "Insomniaque" | Kevlar feat. Myma Mendhy | 2:16 |
| 11. | "Motivé" | Leck | 2:24 |
| 12. | "Laisse-les parler" | Rachid Kasmi feat. Kevlar | 2:40 |
| 13. | "Oulala" | GSX | 2:36 |
| 14. | "Forceur" | Leck | 2:36 |
| 15. | "Faites de la place" | Lartiste | 2:22 |
| 16. | "C'est chaud" | Blanka feat. Biwai | 2:22 |
| 17. | "Le sang chaud" | Zifou | 2:15 |
| 18. | "Afrorai" | Camro feat. Kader Japonais | 2:50 |
| 19. | "Fais-moi un biseau" | Runtown feat. Lartiste | 3:13 |
| 20. | "Hamouda" | Clayton Hamilton feat. Sultan & Fayz | 2:27 |
| 21. | "J'aime bien moi ça" | W | 2:36 |
| 22. | "Génération westhtaa" | Soufiane Spagnoli feat. RJ & Sky | 2:23 |
| 23. | "À la marocaine" | Daoudi feat. Tiiw Tiiw & Leck | 3:04 |
| 24. | "Tiiw Tiiw" | Chaabi Live Band | 2:07 |
| 25. | "Jani message" | Aymane Serhani | 2:43 |
| 26. | "C'est normal" | Youness feat. Kalsha & Alp | 3:07 |
| 27. | "Piña colada" | H Magnum | 3:06 |
| 28. | "Jhoom Jhoom" | Adnan feat. Aymane Serhani | 2:48 |
| 29. | "Chaftek Zawali" | Cheb Rayan | 1:44 |
| 30. | "Tigresse" | Rim'k | 3:21 |

== À la bien Mix Party 2017 ==
- Tracks: 22
- Release date: 19 May 2017
- Record label: Meknessi Style Records / Musicast
- Charts

| Year | Album | Peak positions | | | |
| Year | Album | FR | BEL (Wa) | BEL (Vl) | NED |
|---|---|---|---|---|---|
| 2017 | À la bien Mix Party 2017 | 4 | 14 | 98 | 59 |

| Track # | Song title | Credits / Featuring | Length |
|---|---|---|---|
| 1. | "Introduction" | DJ Hamida | 5:11 |
| 2. | "C'est une frappe" | feat. Lartiste | 3:16 |
| 3. | "Habibi" | feat. Zouhair Bahaoui | 2:48 |
| 4. | "Pablo" | feat. La Fouine | 2:45 |
| 5. | "Por Favor" | feat. Cheb Nadir & Bash | 3:11 |
| 6. | "Diamant" | feat. Ridsa | 2:52 |
| 7. | "Welcome to the Club" | feat. DJ Nas | 2:15 |
| 8. | "Tu voulais" | feat. Leck | 2:45 |
| 9. | "Calma Calma " | feat. Chebba Maria | 3:19 |
| 10. | "Love" | feat. Myma Mendhy | 2:40 |
| 11. | "On coffre" | feat. Naza & KeBlack | 2:51 |
| 12. | "Danger" | feat. F1rstman & Souf | 2:52 |
| 13. | "Aynik zayra" | feat. Statia | 2:52 |
| 14. | "Bara Bara" | feat. Sosa Lossa | 2:56 |
| 15. | "Dja la foule" | feat. Mc One & Fababy | 3:21 |
| 16. | "Guerria" | feat. Alrima | 2:22 |
| 17. | "Rod Balek" | feat. RJ & Nass Al Ghiwane | 3:07 |
| 18. | "Yal bnete" | feat. Cravata | 2:43 |
| 19. | "Moussem 2017" | feat. Leck & Hamid Bouchnak | 3:03 |
| 20. | "Chaabi Mix Party 2017" | feat. Tiiw Tiiw | 2:45 |
| 21. | "Dakka Marrakchia" | feat. Arafa | 2:31 |
| 22. | "À la bien mix party de 2007 à 2017 " | feat. DJ K-Lead | 5:15 |

== À la bien Mix Party 2018 ==
- Tracks: 21
- Date released: 22 June 2018
- Record label: Meknessi Style Records
- Charts

| Year | Album | Peak positions | | | |
| Year | Album | FR | BEL (Wa) | BEL (Vl) | NED |
|---|---|---|---|---|---|
| 2018 | À la bien Mix Party 2018 | 2 | 17 | 81 | 184 |

| Track # | Song title | Credits / Featuring | Length |
|---|---|---|---|
| 1. | "Intro" | DJ Hamida | 5:05 |
| 2. | "Ciao bella" | feat. Lartiste | 3:01 |
| 3. | "Scénario" | feat. Aymane Serhani & Balti | 3:23 |
| 4. | "Infidèles" | feat. Leck | 2:39 |
| 5. | "Chekama" | feat. Hafssa Da & CHK | 3:16 |
| 6. | "Dans le banks" | feat. 4Keus Gang & Leck | 2:25 |
| 7. | "Abracadabra" | feat. Cravata & Alrima | 2:56 |
| 8. | "Officiel" | feat. Elams & Chebba Maria | 3:11 |
| 9. | "Titiza" | feat. Mido Belhbib & GSX | 2:28 |
| 10. | "Walou walou" | feat. Imad Belomar, Biwaï & 7ARI | 2:53 |
| 11. | "Dertli boom" | feat. Cheb Nadir, Leck & Gazouza | 3:13 |
| 12. | "Sans pression" | feat. Landy | 2:03 |
| 13. | "La Casa del Papel" | feat. Sadek | 2:50 |
| 14. | "Amina" | feat. Alrima | 2:43 |
| 15. | "Dima Nachat sur Snapchat" | feat. Youbig & Harone Synthé | 2:07 |
| 16. | "Rai Mix Party" | feat. Youbig & Harone Synthé | 1:21 |
| 17. | "Joga Joga" | feat. Carolina & F1rstman | 2:56 |
| 18. | "Follow Me" | feat. Nej' | 3:10 |
| 19. | "Chaabi do Brasil" | feat. TiiwTiiw | 2:04 |
| 20. | "Walid Sax vs. DJ Hamida" | feat. Walid Sax | 1:10 |
| 21. | "Outro" | feat. Lady Style | 2:29 |

== À la bien Mix Party 2019 ==
- Tracks: 20
- Date released: 5 July 2019
- Record label: Meknessi Style Records
- Charts

| Year | Album | Peak positions | | |
| Year | Album | FR | BEL (Wa) | BEL (Vl) |
|---|---|---|---|---|
| 2019 | À la bien Mix Party 2019 | 14 | 68 | 32 |

| Track # | Song title | Credits / Featuring | Length |
|---|---|---|---|
| 1. | "Introduction À la bien 2019" | DJ Hamida | 4:00 |
| 2. | "Msayfa" | Cheb Bello feat. Balti | 4:23 |
| 3. | "Jawbini" | Mido Belahbib feat. Biwai | 2:36 |
| 4. | "La Cabenza" | Nassi feat. Imen Es | 2:51 |
| 5. | "Ma chérie" | Leck | 2:38 |
| 6. | "Story" | Nassi feat. Imen Es | 2:51 |
| 7. | "Mamino" | Hafssa Da feat. Ali B | 3:27 |
| 8. | "Tour du monde" | Scridge | 2:57 |
| 9. | "Kendi dalgama" | C-Coz feat. Ice & Oualid | 2:57 |
| 10. | "Passer passer" | Dystinct feat. CHK | 2:15 |
| 11. | "Tijd" | Ramos feat. F1rstman | 2:45 |
| 12. | "Désolé por favor" | Aymane Serhani feat. Dafina Zeqiri | 2:54 |
| 13. | "Mama mama" | H Magnum feat. Farida R'Guiba | 2:52 |
| 14. | "T mon BB" | Mounir Kidadi feat. Abdi | 2:35 |
| 15. | "Funky Rai Attitude" | JR O Chrome (Sexion D'Assaut) feat. Chebba Maria | 3:02 |
| 16. | "Toute la night" | Issaka Weezy | 2:50 |
| 17. | "Zinaoua" | Leila Chakir feat. Leck | 2:38 |
| 18. | "A-Freak" | DJ Nas | 2:03 |
| 19. | "Hbibi" | Ikram El Abdia | 1:55 |
| 20. | "Outro À la bien 2019" | DJ Hamida | 1:09 |

== À la bien Mix Party 2020 ==
- Tracks: 24
- Date released: 31 July 2020
- Record label: Believe / Meknessi Style Records
- Charts

| Year | Album | Peak positions | | |
| Year | Album | FR | BEL (Wa) | BEL (Vl) |
|---|---|---|---|---|
| 2020 | À la bien Mix Party 2020 | 10 | 22 | 125 |

| Track # | Song title | Credits / Featuring | Length |
|---|---|---|---|
| 1. | "Introduction À la bien 2020" | DJ Hamida feat. Abdel Soulax | 3:53 |
| 2. | "Loin de là" | feat. Hajar MKS | 2:30 |
| 3. | "L'Italienne" | feat. Cheb Houssem & Leck | 2:36 |
| 4. | "Catalyna" | feat. IK (TLF) | 2:44 |
| 5. | "Stik Stik" | feat. Youbig | 2:33 |
| 6. | "Lettre à mon fils" | feat. Cheba Dalila & Lbenj | 3:05 |
| 7. | "On va essayer" | feat. Marvin MN | 2:47 |
| 8. | "Rif gang" | feat. Ashafar & Tarik Tito | 2:53 |
| 9. | "Prishtina" | feat. Sara Fraisou & Mani | 2:26 |
| 10. | "C'est une bombe" | feat. Dinor rdt | 2:31 |
| 11. | "Rock gada" | feat. Chieck Nirvana | 2:13 |
| 12. | "Frontières" | feat. Anas Benturquia & Cheb Bello | 3:24 |
| 13. | "Ce genre des bails" | feat. Biwaï & Nassi | 3:35 |
| 14. | "Dubaï to Amsterdam" | DJ Hamida | 2:27 |
| 15. | "I Don't Need" | feat. Nassimo Rodriguez | 3:09 |
| 16. | "Remontada" | feat. Leck | 3:08 |
| 17. | "Berbère Gang" | feat. Leila Chakir & L'artiste | 4:01 |
| 18. | "Karima" | feat. 7liwa & Youbig | 3:10 |
| 19. | "Achelhi Gang" | feat. Rayyis Hamid & R.J. | 3:56 |
| 20. | "Sac à dos" | feat. 13ème Art & Soufiane Spagnoli | 3:06 |
| 21. | "Kemara" | feat. Abdo Commando & Moussier Tombola | 3:10 |
| 22. | "Chaabi Mix Party" | feat. Boukchacha Meknessi | 2:57 |
| 23. | "Latino Gang" | feat. Dystinct | 3:23 |
| 24. | "Outroduction" | DJ Hamida | 0:35 |
