= List of top 100 singles of 2014 (France) =

This is the list of the 100 best-selling singles of 2014 in France. Rankings are based on the combined sales of physical and digital singles.

== Top 100 singles ==
Pos.	Artist(s)	Single
1	Pharrell Williams	"Happy"
2	Lilly Wood and the Prick	"Prayer in C" (Robin Schulz Remix)
3	Sia	"Chandelier"
4	Indila	"Dernière danse"
5	Milky Chance	"Stolen Dance"
6	Black M	"Sur Ma Route"
7	London Grammar	"Wasting My Young Years"
8	Coldplay	"A Sky Full of Stars"
9	Mr Probz	"Waves" (Robin Schulz Remix)
10	Disclosure featuring Eliza Doolittle	"You & Me"
11	Clean Bandit featuring Jess Glynne	"Rather Be"
12	John Legend	"All of Me"
13	Tove Lo	"Habits (Stay High)"
14	Maître Gims	"Zombie"
15	Cris Cab	"Liar Liar"
16	Daft Punk featuring Julian Casablancas	"Instant Crush"
17	Magic System featuring Chawki	"Magic in the Air"
18	David Guetta featuring Sam Martin	"Dangerous"
19	Rebel featuring Sidney Housen	"Black Pearl (He's a Pirate)"
20	Michael Jackson and Justin Timberlake	"Love Never Felt So Good"
21	OneRepublic	"Counting Stars"
22	Avicii	"Addicted to You"
23	Cats on Trees	"Sirens Call"
24	Klingande	"Jubel"
25	The Avener	"Fade Out Lines"
26	Tom Odell	"Another Love"
27	Faul & Wad Ad vs. Pnau	"Changes"
28	Daft Punk featuring Pharrell Williams	"Get Lucky"
29	Jason Derulo featuring Snoop Dogg	"Wiggle"
30	Katy Perry featuring Juicy J	"Dark Horse"
31	Imagine Dragons	"Demons"
32	Stromae	"Tous les mêmes"
33	Calogero	"Un jour au mauvais endroit"
34	Julien Doré	"Paris-Seychelles"
35	David Guetta featuring Sam Martin	"Lovers on the Sun"
36	Stromae	"Papaoutai"
37	Kendji Girac	"Andalouse"
38	George Ezra	"Budapest"
39	Black M	"Mme Pavoshko"
40	Avicii	"Hey Brother"
41	Ed Sheeran	"Sing"
42	Stromae	"Formidable"
43	Lorde	"Royals"
44	Indila	"Tourner dans le vide"
45	Kyo	"Le Graal"
46	Sam Smith	"Stay with Me"
47	Beyoncé featuring Jay Z	"Drunk in Love"
48	Calvin Harris	"Summer"
49	Jabberwocky	"Photomaton"
50	Deorro	"Five Hours"
51	Kendji Girac	"Color Gitano"
52	Shakira	"Dare (La La La)"
53	Pitbull featuring Kesha	"Timber"
54	Lily Allen	"Somewhere Only We Know"
55	Soprano	"Cosmo"
56	Shakira featuring Rihanna	"Can't Remember to Forget You"
57	Indila	"S.O.S"
58	Emma Louise	"Jungle"
59	Christine and the Queens	"Saint Claude"
60	David Guetta and Showtek featuring Vassy	"Bad"
61	Nico & Vinz	"Am I Wrong"
62	Coldplay	"Magic"
63	David Guetta featuring Skylar Grey	"Shot Me Down"
64	Anaïs Delva	"Libérée, Délivrée"
65	Imagine Dragons	"Radioactive"
66	Mark Ronson featuring Bruno Mars	"Uptown Funk"
67	Black M featuring The Shin Sekaï and Doomams	"Je ne dirai rien"
68	Avicii	"Wake Me Up"
69	Ariana Grande featuring Iggy Azalea	"Problem"
70	Pitbull featuring Jennifer Lopez and Claudia Leite	"We Are One (Ole Ola)"
71	Coeur de Pirate	"Mistral gagnant"
72	Keen'V	"Dis-moi oui (Marina)"
73	Lorde	"Team"
74	DJ Snake featuring Lil' Jon	"Turn Down for What"
75	Calvin Harris featuring John Newman	"Blame"
76	Black M and Dr. Beriz	"La Légende Black"
77	Major Lazer featuring Sean Paul	"Come On to Me"
78	Meghan Trainor	"All About That Bass"
79	Enrique Iglesias featuring Descemer Bueno	"Bailando"
80	Mika	"Boum Boum Boum"
81	U2	"Ordinary Love"
82	Disclosure featuring Sam Smith	"Latch"
83	Lykke Li	"I Follow Rivers"
84	New World Sound and Thomas Newson	"Flute"
85	Fréro Delavega	"Sweet Darling"
86	Jul	"Dans ma paranoïa"
87	Josef Salvat	"Diamonds"
88	Soprano	"Fresh Prince"
89	Team BS	"Team BS"
90	DJ Hamida featuring Lartiste, Rim'K and Kayna Samet	"Déconnectés"
91	Maître Gims	"Bella"
92	Team BS	"Case départ"
93	Lenny Kravitz	"The Chamber"
94	Iggy Azalea featuring Rita Ora	"Black Widow"
95	Miley Cyrus	"Wrecking Ball"
96	Aloe Blacc	"The Man"
97	Maître Gims	"Changer"
98	Martin Garrix	"Animals"
99	Martin Tungevaag	"Wicked Wonderland"
100	Sia	"Big Girls Cry"

== See also ==
- 2014 in music
- List of number-one hits of 2014 (France)
- List of top 10 singles in 2014 (France)
