= Dystinct =

Moroccan-Belgian singer (born 1998)

Dystinct الياس المنصوري
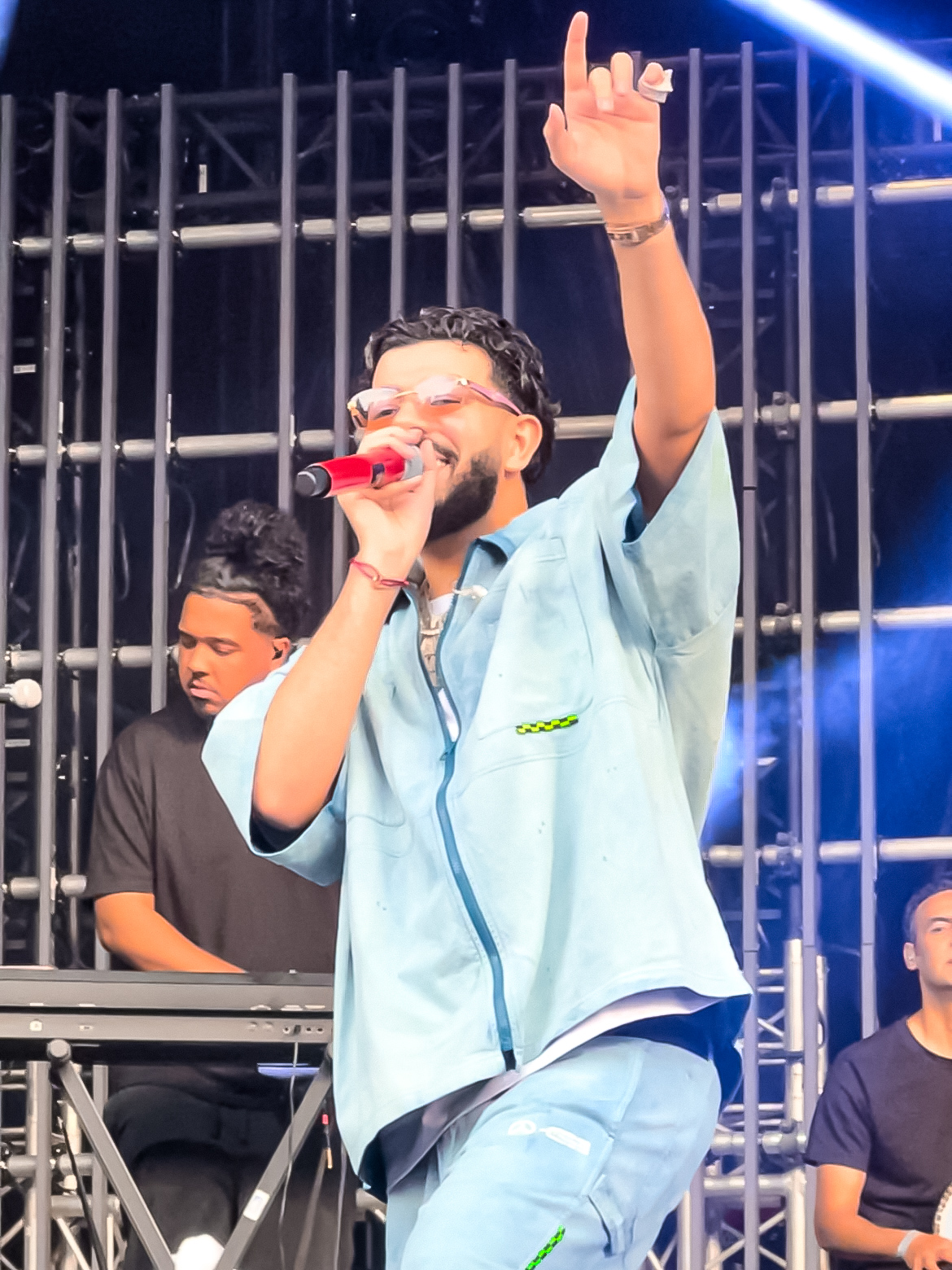

Background information
- Also known as: Dystinct
- Born: Iliass Mansouri; 9 September 1998 (age 28); Mortsel, Belgium
- Genres: Reggae, raï, pop-rap
- Occupations: Singer, songwriter, music producer
- Years active: 2017–present

Iliass Mansouri (Arabic: إلياس المنصوري, born 9 September 1998), better known by his stage name Dystinct (stylized in all caps), is a Belgian-Moroccan singer-songwriter and music producer. He is among the most-streamed artists in the MENA region as well as Europe.

== Early life ==
Iliass Mansouri was born on 9 September 1998, in Mortsel, in the province of Antwerp, Belgium, to a Moroccan family. He grew up in the Zurenborg neighborhood of Antwerp. In addition to Belgian nationality, he also holds Moroccan nationality. During his youth, he played football at Dageraadplaats near his neighborhood in Antwerp. Later, he followed in his father's footsteps, who was a singer, abandoning his passion for football and turning towards music production before beginning to sing at the age of 14. He started developing his art through English covers and then moved on to composing in Dutch, often mixing languages.

At 18, while his family moved to Molenbeek-Saint-Jean in the Étangs Noirs neighborhood, Dystinct relocated to Amsterdam, Netherlands, after signing his first contract with Avalon Music, where he began collaborating with various Dutch artists.

He took on several jobs, from call center advisor to accounting assistant. Dystinct negotiated with his mother for a gap year after obtaining his bachelor's degree, promising to fully commit to music for a year. If he didn't succeed, he pledged to return to his studies. With a contract from Avalon Music, Dystinct released his first Dutch-language songs, including the audio track "Panamera." He also released his first music videos, such as "No Ring Ring," and collaborated with Moroccan artist Ahmed Chawki on the track "Zina." Aiming to popularize his name in the Benelux and Maghreb region, Dystinct quickly engaged in international collaborations, notably in 2018 with French rapper Franglish for a track on his album titled "Que Pasa".

== Career ==
=== First project: Mon Voyage (2018–2021) ===
Influenced by pop culture and the Dutch "allochtoon" (immigrant) music scene, Mansouri chose the title Mon Voyage ("My Journey") for his debut studio album, aiming to tell the story of his musical path. As he explained in an interview with Belgian press:

"It's about my journey, my path in music."

The album featured collaborations with Dutch artists 3robi & Chivv, Moroccan artists Chawki & Inkonnu, French artist Souf, German artist Ardian Bujupi, and Belgian artist Tawsen. Released on 9 July 2021, the album broke records as the best-selling album in Morocco in 2021.

=== International breakthrough with Ghazali (2021–2022) ===
In early 2021, Dystinct recorded Ghazali ("My Beauty" in English) with Belgian rapper Bryan Mg, produced by Dutch duo YAM & Unleaded (from Avalon Music). Initially hesitant to release it due to its departure from his usual style, he was convinced by his producers and manager. The song was filmed in Monaco with Bryan Mg.

Dystinct later reflected:

"I had other songs scheduled, and Ghazali—where I sang in Moroccan Arabic with French rap—was different. I kept saying, ‘Not now!’ But they pushed me. I agreed to test it, and it dropped just before the 2022 World Cup. The rest is history. Lesson learned: don't be too stubborn!"

The track became an anthem for Morocco's national football team, the Atlas Lions, during their historic 2022 World Cup run. Players celebrated victories by dancing to Ghazali, thanks to Dystinct's friend, footballer Abdelhamid Sabiri. Dystinct told Belgian media:

"Seeing the Moroccan team embrace my song was insane. Ghazali's success was completely unexpected."

Released on 3 June 2022, the music video broke streaming records in Belgium and across the Maghreb. The song blends Moroccan Arabic vocals (Dystinct) and French rap (Bryan Mg) over a pop-raï guitar melody, telling the story of a man enchanted by a woman's beauty.

In November 2022, Dystinct attended the World Cup in Qatar as a guest of Moroccan footballer Ilias Chair (a fellow Antwerp native).

=== Second project: Layali (2023) ===
On 5 May 2023, Dystinct made his debut on Skyrock's Planète Rap, performing Ghazali and the exclusive Tek Tek—a preview of his sophomore album Layali (released 9 June 2023). The album's lead single, Tek Tek (feat. MHD), went viral on TikTok.

Layali is a multilingual and multicultural project uniting European and global sounds, featuring songs such as Ku Je Ti (26 May 2023), a collab with Swedish rapper Ricky Rich and Kosovar singer Dafina Zeqiri, featuring Albanian-Kosovar dance and global flags in the video and Business (2 June 2023) with French artist Naza. On 10 June 2023, Brussels mayor Philippe Close hosted Dystinct for an exclusive tribute at City Hall.

=== CAF Awards performance (2024) ===
On 16 December 2024, Dystinct performed at the CAF Awards in Marrakech, singing Ghazali and Tek Tek at the sports gala.

== Discography ==
=== Albums ===
- Mon Voyage (2021)
- Layali (2023)
- Bababa World (2025)

=== Singles ===
==== As lead artist ====
- 2017: "Panamera"
- 2017: "No Ring Ring"
- 2017: "Zina" (featuring Chawki)
- 2017: "Pablo"
- 2017: "Wat Je Wilt"
- 2018: "Que Pasa" (featuring Franglish)
- 2018: "Vervloekt"
- 2019: "Chicha del Ghetto"
- 2019: "Ya La Laa"
- 2019: "Boussa"
- 2020: "Blessing"
- 2020: "Malika"
- 2020: "Awaa"
- 2021: "Habiba" (featuring Tawsen)
- 2021: "Alleen" (featuring Ardian Bujupi)
- 2021: "Nada Nada"
- 2021: "Ya Dellali" (featuring Bryan Mg)
- 2021: "Fini"
- 2022: "Niye" (featuring Ali471)
- 2022: "Omri" (featuring Kouz1)
- 2023: "Ku Je Ti" (featuring Ricky Rich & Dafina Zeqiri)
- 2023: "Business" (featuring Naza)
- 2024: "Wala 5, 7, 10"
- 2024: "Salam"
- 2024: "Spider" (with Gims)
- 2024: "Pas comme ça" (featuring Dadju)
- 2024: "Mazal" (featuring Dadju)
- 2024: "Dumlla Dumlla" (featuring Dafina Zeqiri)
- 2025: "Boss" (featuring Werenoi)
- 2025: "Ya Baba" (featuring French Montana)
- 2025: "RS6" (featuring Morad)
- 2025: "Selek" (featuring Gazo)
- 2026: "TA3AL"
- 2025: "YAMA"
- 2026: "MANSORY"
- 2026: "HAJDE" (featuring Noizy)
- 2026: "KATKOUTA"

===== As featured artist =====
- 2017: "Kabhi" by F1rstman and Dystinct
- 2018: "Daba Daba" by Oualid and Dystinct
- 2018: "Alé Vamos" by Chawki and Dystinct
- 2018: "Real Thing" by Quesswho and Dystinct
- 2019: "Mal a la tête" by Bryan Mg and Dystinct
- 2019: "Sensiz" by Emil Rosé and Dystinct
- 2019: "Passer passer" by DJ Hamida, Dystinct and CHK
- 2020: "Choqué" by GLK and Dystinct
- 2020: "Problematik" by TiiwTiiw and Dystinct
- 2020: "Latino Gang" by DJ Hamida and Dystinct
- 2020: "Fidèle" by Maestro and Dystinct
- 2021: "Oh Bébé" by DJ Sem and Dystinct
- 2021: "Real Love" by Architrackz and Dystinct
- 2021: "Dommage" by Driks and Dystinct
- 2021: "Démarre" by 3robi and Dystinct
- 2021: "Mehbooba" by F1rstman and Dystinct
- 2022: "Diamant" by DJ Sem and Dystinct
- 2022: "Bebegim" by Ali471 and Dystinct
- 2022: "Ik hoor je" by Ice, Dystinct and Ashafar
- 2023: "Alone" by Makar and Dystinct
- 2023: "Darba 9adiya" by Moha K and Dystinct
- 2023: "Ça c'est bien" by Franglish and Dystinct
- 2023: "Rashel" by Jungeli and Dystinct
- 2024: "Oh qu'elle est belle by Jul and Dystinct
- 2024: "Souvenir" by Heuss l'Enfoiré and Dystinct
- 2024: "Dayanamam" by Emil Rose and Dystinct
- 2024: "SI NO ERES TU" by Rvfv and Dystinct
- 2024: "MORE PRETTY GIRLS" by Frenna, Davido and Dystinct
- 2024: "Dumlla Dumlla" by Dafina Zeqiri and Dystinct'
- 2024: "Comment te remplacer" by Carbonne, Michaël Brun and Dystinct
- 2024: "LUJ" by Butrint Imeri and Dystinct
- 2025: "BOSS" by No Limit, Werenoi, DJ Milane and Dystinct
- 2025: "Immer" by Jazeek and Dystinct
- 2025: "Gili Gili" by Naza and Dystinct
- 2025: "YAMA BY NIGHT" by Hugel and Dystinct
- 2026: "GEL GEL GEL" by Lvbel C5 and Dystinct
- 2026: "Felous Baba" by Ahmed Saad, Orange and Dystinct
- 2026: "AYAYAY" by Sfera Ebbasta and Dystinct

=== Charted singles ===
==== As lead artist ====
List of charted singles as lead artist, with year, album and chart positions
Title	Year	Peak chart position						Album or EP
Title	Year	BEL (WA)	FRA	ISR	MENA	NA	KSA	Album or EP
"Ghazali" (featuring Bryan Mg)	2022	—	121	*	12	*		Layali
"Tek tek" (featuring MHD)	2023	34	12	*	19	*		Layali
"Business" (featuring Naza)	2023	28	12	*	—	—	—	Layali
"La"	2023	—	—	*	9	2	—	Layali
"Spider" (with Gims)	2024	1	1	—	—	1	—	Le Nord se souvient
"Yama"	2025	—	—	27	10	4	15	Non-album single
"—" denotes a recording that did not chart or was not released in that territory. "*" denotes that the chart did not exist at that time.

==== As featured artist ====
List of charted singles as featured artist, with year, album and chart positions
Title	Year	Peak chart position			Album or EP
Title	Year	BEL (WA)	FRA	NA	Album or EP
"Y dor" (Soolking featuring Dystinct)	2023	—	126	5	Non-album single
"Oh qu'elle est belle" (Jul featuring Dystinct)	2024	36	8	17	Décennie
"—" denotes a recording that did not chart or was not released in that territory.

== Tours ==
- Layali: (2023–2024) Europe, North America (Canada) including AFAS Live
- Baba: (2025) North Africa (Morocco), Europe, North America (USA & Canada)

== Awards ==
- 2023 : Winner Best Artist - North Africa of at the Trace Awards
- 2023 : Nominated for Belgian Newcomer of the Year at the NRJ Music Awards
- 2024 : Best Album at the FunX Music Awards for LAYALI
