= DJ Kayz =

French DJ

DJ Kayz a French/Algerian DJ of Kabylie origin born in Algeria, famous for his music mix series Oran Mix Party, Kabylifornie and the album series Paris Oran New York in three CDs (2013-2014-2015), collaborating with a great number of artists. He started DJing in 1995 and his debut mixtape was a precursor of the emerging fusion sound of raï & R&B gaining momentum in the early 2000s like in his participation in R&B Funk Raï Summer Show 2003 in competition with similar artists like Kore and his series Raï'n'B Fever. DJ Kayz mixes North African and Mediterranean flavors becoming popular in various venues and taking part in tours in France and in the Maghreb countries.

== Discography ==
=== Albums ===
Year	Album	Peak positions		Certification
Year	Album	FR	BEL (Wa)	Certification
2013	Paris Oran New York (Summer Collector)	–	–	
2014	Paris Oran New York	14	123	
2015	Paris Oran New York 2015	9	56	
2016	DJ Kayz	23	–	
2018	En famille	10	44	France: Gold

=== Mixes ===
- 2005: Oran Mix Party
- 2006: Oran Mix Party Vol. 2
- 2007: Oran Mix Party Vol. 3
- 2009: Oran Mix Party Vol. 4
- 2010: Oran Mix Party Vol. 5
- 2011: Oran Mix Party Vol. 6
- 2011: Kabylifornie (Mixés par DJ Kayz)
- 2011: Kabylifornie, Vol. 2 (Mixés par DJ Kayz)
- 2012: Oran Mix Party Vol. 7
- 2012: The Best of DJ Kayz (compilation album)
- 2016: Best of Oran Mix Party (compilation album)

=== Singles ===
(Selective, charting releases)

Year	Single	Peak positions		Album
Year	Single	FR	BEL (Wa)	Album
2014	"Fidèle à ma team" (feat. Jul)	136	–	Paris Oran New York
2014	"Du swagg" (feat. (H Magnum & Maître Gims)	45	14* (Ultratip)	Paris Oran New York
2014	"100 mecs sans meuf" (DJ Kayz presents Ridsa & Li'lya DS)	162	–	
2015	"Jugni ji" (feat. Mister You, Dr Zeus & Sophia Akkara)	43	–	Paris Oran New York 2015
2015	"Mariage dérangé" (feat. Souf, Farid & Oussama)	30	–	Paris Oran New York 2015
2015	"Validé" (feat. Ridsa & Axel Tony)	12	40* (Ultratip)	Paris Oran New York 2015
2015	"On s'met bien" (feat. Ridsa)	143	–	Paris Oran New York 2015
2016	"Coller serrer" (feat. Gradur)	17	–	
2017	"Fuego" (feat. Souf)	44	–	
2018	"Jour J" (feat. Wassila & Scridge)	32	21* (Ultratip)	En famille
2020	"Monte le son" (feat. Niska)	50	–	
2021	"Masterclass" (feat. RK & Landy)	85	–	Non-album release
2021	"Bled" (feat. Moha K)	81	–	Non-album release

*Did not appear in the official Belgian Ultratop 50 charts, but rather in the bubbling under Ultratip charts.

=== Featured in ===
Year	Title	Peak positions	Album
Year	Title	FR	Album
2011	"On reste fiers" (Rim'K feat. Kader Japonais & DJ Kayz)	–	

=== Other songs ===
Year	Title	Peak positions	Album
Year	Title	FR	Album
2011	"History" (DJ Kayz feat. Frissco)	–	
2014	"Jnouné" (feat. Rim'k, Jul & Dieselle)	176	Paris Oran New York
2015	"Beauté marocaine" (DJ Kayz feat. Souf)	–	Paris Oran New York 2015
2016	"Com'dab" (feat. KeBlack & Naza)	190	
2018	"Foncé" (DJ Kayz feat. Lartiste & Imen)	138	En famille
2018	"Beauté algérienne" (DJ Kayz feat. Souf & Mounir Kidadi)	174	En famille
