= Vroom (disambiguation) =

Vroom is a word that phonetically imitates the sound of an engine revving up.

Vroom also may refer to:

== Arts, entertainment, and media ==
- Vroom (film), a 1988 TV film directed by Beeban Kidron
- "Vroom" (song), a 2018 single by British rapper Yxng Bane
- Vroom (video game), a 1992 game for the Atari ST produced by Lankhor
- Vroom, a 1997 compilation CD given away by British music magazine Select
- Vroom, a Serbian rock group that followed Ništa Ali Logopedi
- Vroom, a classified magazine published by Belgian company Mediahuis
- The Vrooms, fictional characters in Driver Dan's Story Train, a British-Arabian children's TV series

== Other uses ==
- Vroom (surname)
- Vroom & Dreesmann, a Dutch chain of department stores founded in 1887
- Vroom (company), an American e-commerce website for used cars

== See also ==
- Vroom Vroom (disambiguation)
- Vrooom Vroom Vroooom, a 1995 short film directed by Melvin Van Peebles
- Varoom (disambiguation)
- Vrooom, a 1994 album by King Crimson
- "Vroum Vroum" (Moha K song), 2021
