= Vroom Vroom (disambiguation) =

Vroom Vroom is a word that phonetically imitates the sound of an engine revving up.

Vroom Vroom may also refer to:

- Vroom Vroom (TV series), a British TV series
- Vroom Vroom (EP), an EP by Charli XCX
  - "Vroom Vroom" (song), a song by Charli XCX
- "Vroom Vroom", a single from the 2016 album Evolution Pop Vol. 1 by South Korean girl group Crayon Pop
- "Vroom Vroom", a song from the soundtrack of the 2015 Indian film 10 Endrathukulla
- "Vroom Vroom", a song by Exo-CBX from the 2018 EP Blooming Days
- "Vroom, Vroom", an episode from Bali, a French-Canadian animated TV series

== See also ==
- Vroom (disambiguation)
- "Vroum Vroum", a song by Moha K.
- Vrooom Vrooom, an EP by King Crimson
- Vroom Vroom Vroooom, an American short film released in 1995
