= Laetitia Kerfa =

French rapper, singer-songwriter, performer, and actor

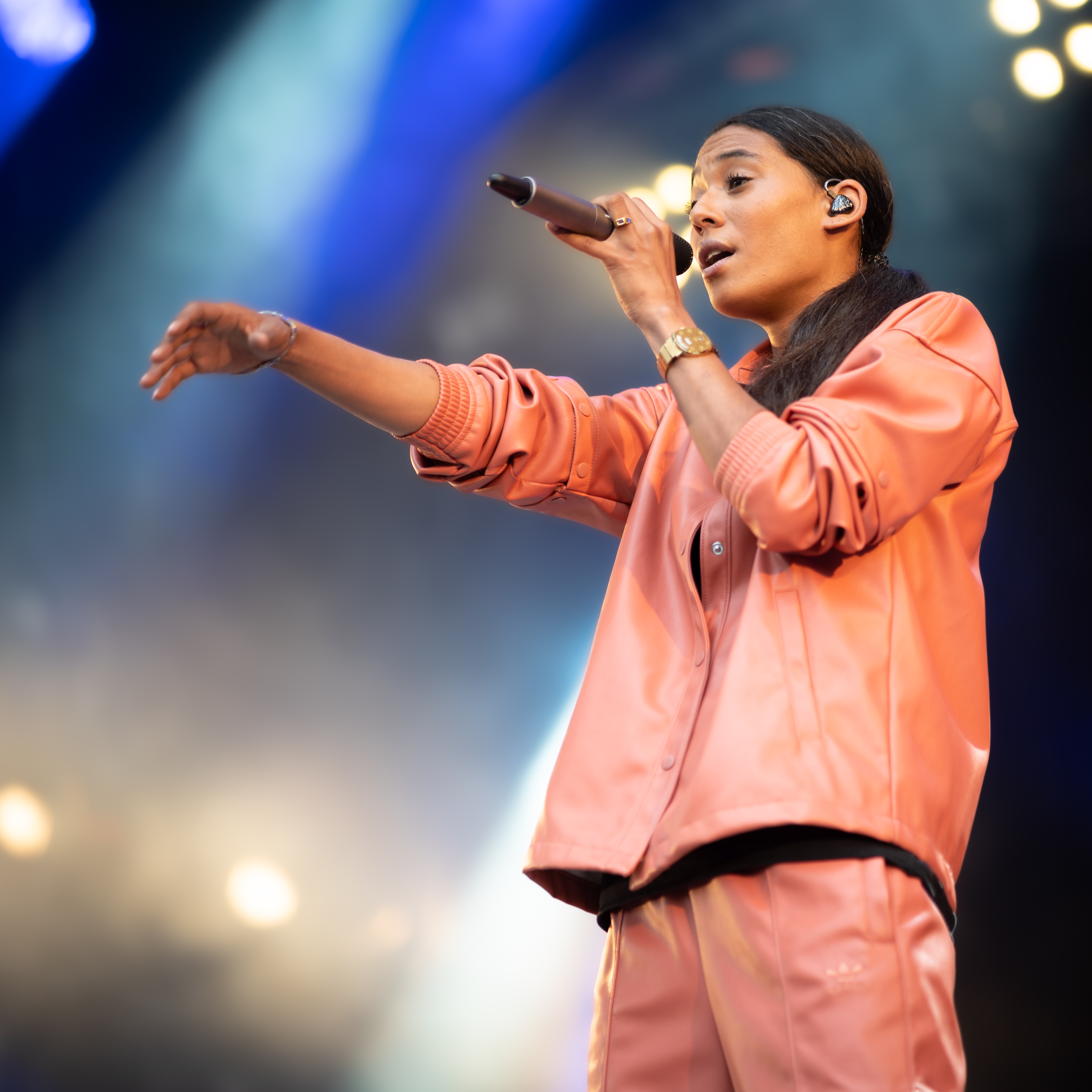
- Laeti at the Toul concert in 2022
- Born: 1994 (age 31–32); Paris, France
- Occupation: Rapper Singer-songwriter Performer Actor

Laetitia Kerfa, known as Laeti, is a French rapper, singer-songwriter, performer, and actor.

== Biography ==
Laetitia Kerfa was born in 1994 and grew up in Paris in a family of Algerian and Guadeloupean descent.

She performed her first raps within the collective Keskiya, then was noticed in 2019 in Du Sale!, Pièce d'actualité n°12 at the Théâtre de la Commune in Aubervilliers, where she acted and rapped alongside the dancer Janice Bieleu, in a production directed by Marion Siéfert. This show, which she co-wrote, is partly autobiographical. She was notably the author of her rap lyrics in the performance.

She is preparing the release of her first album for early 2022.

In 2021, she played the leading role (Lalpha) in season 2 of the series Validé by Franck Gastambide, which was released on 11 October on Canal+.

== Discography ==
Albums

- One Day With, One Day Without: 2022

Singles

- Ride All Night: 2021
- The Road Is Long (with Kayna Samet): 2022
- I Don't Love You Anymore: 2022
- God Bless: 2022

Collaborations

- Shine (with Alonzo): 2021
- Fellow: 2021
- Blue Sofa: 2021
- Tell Me (with Soolking): 2021
- Freestyle 1: 2021
- Freestyle 2: 2021
- You Go Away (with Manu Chao): 2024

== Filmography ==
- Validé: 2021
