= DJ Hamida =

French-Moroccan DJ and record producer

- Born: Ahmed Sidi Taanoun; 24 May 1986 (age 39); Lyon, France
- Occupations: DJ; record producer; remixer; songwriter musiciens
- Musical career
- Website: djhamida.com

Ahmed Sidi Taanoun (Arabic: أحمد سيدي طحنون, born 24 May, 1986), better known by his stage name DJ Hamida (/ˈhæmiːdə/), is a French-Moroccan DJ musician and record producer, known for the series À La Bien Mix Party and Meknessi Style which he promotes. His biggest success has been with the single "Déconnectés" featuring Kayna Samet, Rim'K, Lartiste, and Soprano.

== Discography ==
=== Albums ===
Year	Album	Peak positions			
Year	Album	FR	BEL (Wa)	BEL (Fl)	NED
2011	À la bien Mix Party 2011	–	–	–	–
2012	À la bien Mix Party 2012	–	–	–	–
2013	À la bien Mix Party 2013	–	–	–	–
2014	À la bien Mix Party 2014	10	76	–	–
2015	DJ Hamida Mix Party 2015	–	40	–	–
2016	DJ Hamida Mix Party 2016	6	23	166	–
2017	À la bien Mix Party 2017	4	14	98	–
2018	À la bien Mix Party 2018	2	17	81	184
2019	À la bien Mix Party 2019	14	32	68	–
2020	À la bien Mix Party 2020	10	22	125	–
2021	Sunshine	–	89	–	–
2022	À la bien – Summer Edition	–	142	–	–

=== Singles ===
Year	Single	Peak positions		Album
Year	Single	FR	BEL (Wa)	Album
2014	"Déconnectés" (feat. Kayna Samet, Rim'K & Lartiste)	14	7* (Ultratip)	À la bien Mix Party 2014
2015	"Paname" (feat. Cam'ro)	82	–	
2017	"C'est une frappe" (pronounced [se yn fʁap]) (feat. Lartiste)	73	–	

*Did not appear in the official Belgian Ultratop 50 charts, but rather in the bubbling under Ultratip charts.

Other charting releases

Year	Single	Peak positions	Album
Year	Single	FR	Album
2014	"Intro numero uno"	149	À la bien Mix Party 2014
2014	"Ana Liouma" (feat. Mister You & Al Bandit)	142	À la bien Mix Party 2014
2014	"Trabendo Musical" (feat. Lartiste & Kader Japonais)	149	À la bien Mix Party 2014
2014	"Wesh polo" (feat. Leck & Laly Rai)	158	À la bien Mix Party 2014
2015	"Mehlia (c'est fini)" (feat. Kayna Samet)	136	DJ Hamida Mix Party 2015
2015	"Miss Vilaine" (pronounced [mis vilɛn]) (feat. Lartiste, Leck & Big Ali)	194	DJ Hamida Mix Party 2015
2017	"C'est une frappe" (feat. Lartiste)	86	À la bien Mix Party 2017
2018	"Ciao bella" (feat. Lartiste)	48	À la bien Mix Party 2017
