= Chandelier (song) =

2014 single by Sia

Single by Sia

from the album 1000 Forms of Fear
- Released: 17 March 2014
- Recorded: 2013
- Studio: Hot Closet Studios; Echo Park
- Genre: Electropop
- Length: 3:36
- Label: Monkey Puzzle; RCA
- Songwriters: Sia Furler; Jesse Shatkin
- Producers: Greg Kurstin; Jesse Shatkin

Sia singles chronology
"Battle Cry" (2014)	"Chandelier" (2014)	"Big Girls Cry" (2014)

Music video
- "Chandelier" on YouTube

"Chandelier" is a song by Australian singer and songwriter Sia, from her sixth studio album, 1000 Forms of Fear (2014). Written by Sia and Jesse Shatkin and produced by Shatkin and Greg Kurstin, the song was released on 17 March 2014 as the lead single from the album. It is an electropop song, featuring electronica, R&B and reggae influences. Lyrically, the song has a melancholic theme, detailing the demoralisation and rationalisation of alcoholism through the thought process of a "party girl". More broadly, the song speaks to the fleeting feelings of release and abandon that come with intoxication, as well as the pain, guilt and emptiness that accompany addiction, alcoholism and hedonistic excess.

The single received critical acclaim and reached the top 5 on record charts in 20 countries including France, Italy, Poland, Norway, Australia and New Zealand. In the United States, the single peaked at number 8 on the Billboard Hot 100, becoming Sia's first single as a lead artist to appear on the Hot 100, and has sold over 10 million copies in the country. The song received 4 nominations at the 57th Annual Grammy Awards for Song of the Year, Record of the Year and Best Pop Solo Performance, with its video receiving a nomination for Best Music Video.

A music video for the song, directed by Sia and Daniel Askill, and choreographed by Ryan Heffington, features American dancer Maddie Ziegler. It has been viewed on YouTube more than 2.8 billion times. In support of the single and 1000 Forms of Fear, Sia, often with Ziegler, performed "Chandelier" on a number of US television shows, including The Ellen DeGeneres Show, Late Night with Seth Meyers, Jimmy Kimmel Live!, Saturday Night Live, Dancing With the Stars, and at the 57th Grammy Awards.

== Background ==
In 2010, Sia released her fifth studio album We Are Born, which ended up at number two on the Australian Albums Chart. Following the release, Sia took a hiatus from performing and co-wrote songs for other recording artists, including Beyoncé, Rihanna, Christina Aguilera, Flo Rida and David Guetta. In 2013, Sia recorded the track "Elastic Heart" for The Hunger Games: Catching Fire soundtrack.

In May 2014, Sia announced her sixth studio album 1000 Forms of Fear and released "Chandelier" as its lead single. Sia revealed that she initially wrote the track for Rihanna or Beyoncé, but decided to record the song herself. The melody and chords were formed following a jam session in the studio featuring Sia on the piano and Jesse Shatkin playing a marimba. In the United States, "Chandelier" was released for digital download onto iTunes Stores on 17 March 2014 through Monkey Puzzle, with distribution by RCA Records. In the United Kingdom, "Chandelier" was released digitally on 29 June 2014. A day later, it was sent by RCA Records to US hot adult contemporary radio.

== Composition ==
"Chandelier"
A 21-second sample of "Chandelier", an electropop ballad featuring electronica, contemporary R&B and reggae influences

"Chandelier" was written by Sia and Shatkin and was produced by Kurstin and Shatkin. It was described as an electropop ballad, featuring "soaring" synthesisers, "militant" drums, and hip hop beats with electronica, R&B, and reggae influences. The song features Sia's "jaw-dropping" vocal performance. The song is written in the key of B♭ minor and it follows the chord progression of B♭m–G♭maj7–A♭–Fm in the verses, G♭maj7–B♭m-A♭ in the pre-chorus, and G♭maj7–A♭–D♭/F–G♭maj7 in the chorus. The acoustic version is recorded in G minor. The song's BPM is 90.

Lyrically, "Chandelier" has a sad theme talking about "the glitter and fatigue of a party girl's life". John Walker from MTV Buzzworthy opined that the song has a dark theme, "toeing the line between celebration and self-destruction as it becomes increasingly more blurred". The song's opening lyrics, "Party girls don't get hurt, can't feel anything ... I push it down", are sung over a reggae-influenced background. Walker noted that during the chorus, Sia sings, "I'm gonna swing from the chandelier, from the chandelier/ I'm gonna live like tomorrow doesn't exist, like it doesn't exist". A few critics, including Jeremy Gordon from Pitchfork Media, and Melinda Newman of HitFix, compared the song's musical style to works done by Rihanna.

== Critical reception ==
"Chandelier" has received critical acclaim. Andrew Trendall from Gigwise wrote that the song "springboards Sia from a behind-the-scenes genius into a superstar in her own right". Gordon from Pitchfork praised Sia's vocal performance on the track and commented that the track "is enough to make you want to swing from a chandelier". Bradley Stern from the website MuuMuse labelled "Chandelier" the best pop single of 2014, complimenting Sia's songwriting credits and her voice on the song. In a VH1 article, Emily Exton shared that thought, deeming it the best song Sia had ever written. Writing for Time magazine, Jamieson Cox deemed "Chandelier" a "disarming, unforgettable listen that'll make you glad Sia kept this one for herself." Maura Johnston of Spin wrote "Chandelier,” the opener of 1000 Forms of Fear, has a thudding beat similar to “Diamonds” but more importantly Furler's voice curls around each syllable, rendering some of the lyrics nearly unrecognizable as discreet words." In a less enthusiastic review, Melinda Newman from HitFix thought that Sia "can do a lot better than this". Hugh Montgomery of The Independent noticed the song's "segue from reggae verse to sockingly melodramatic, wind-machine-worthy chorus."

Billboard listed "Chandelier" as the best song of 2014. The song received nominations at the 57th Grammy Awards for Song of the Year, Record of the Year and Best Pop Solo Performance, with its video receiving a nomination for Best Music Video.

=== Year-end lists ===
Publication	Accolade	Rank	Ref
Consequence of Sound	Top 50 Songs of 2014	5	
Rolling Stone	50 Best Songs of 2014	15	
Complex	The 50 Best Songs of 2014	31	
Spin	The 101 Best Songs of 2014	8	
Wondering Sound	75 Best Songs of 2014	74	
Time Out	The 50 Best Songs of 2014	19	
Slant Magazine	The 25 Best Singles of 2014	14	
Pazz & Jop	Single of the Year 2014	7	

== Commercial performance ==
In the United States, "Chandelier" debuted at number 75 on the US Billboard Hot 100 chart dated 31 May 2014. It peaked at number eight on the chart, becoming the first top ten single by Sia to appear on the chart as a lead artist. The song reached one million units sold in the US in August 2014, and surpassed the 2 million mark in sales in January 2015. The song also reached number six on the Canadian Hot 100. In June 2014, the single was certified platinum by Music Canada. "Chandelier" was successful in Oceania and Europe, peaking in the top five on 20 national record charts including: France, and Poland (number one); Australia, Italy and Norway (number two); New Zealand and Slovakia (number three); and Norway and Scotland (number five). The single was certified quadruple platinum by the Australian Recording Industry Association (ARIA), and platinum by the Recorded Music NZ (RMNZ). In the United Kingdom, "Chandelier" charted at number six on the UK Singles Chart. In France, the single was the third best-selling single of 2014, according to Syndicat National de l'Édition Phonographique.

== Music video ==
A shot of the music video, featuring dancer Maddie Ziegler.

The music video for "Chandelier" was released on 6 May 2014, featuring then-11-year-old dancer Maddie Ziegler. In the video, Ziegler wears a medium-length blonde wig matching the one that Sia used to promote the album. Throughout the video, Ziegler performs an interpretive dance in a deserted, dirty apartment "while spinning, kicking, leaping, crawling, falling, twirling and hiding herself behind window drapes". An alternative one-take version of the clip was released in June 2014. Sia had seen Ziegler on Dance Moms and asked her to appear in the video via Twitter. The video was directed by Sia and Daniel Askill, shot by cinematographer Sebastian Winterø and was choreographed by Ryan Heffington. Ziegler shared her thoughts about the choreography with New York magazine:

I like the whole dance. It was really different and weird for me, because I usually don't, you know, be a crazy person every time. It was so fun to do and it was really out of the box and it expanded me a lot, because I'm used to competition dances where you're like, "Point your legs!" But this time it was like, you just need to let go and feel it.

The choreography was praised by media outlets; an editor from The Guardian wrote that Ziegler "dances with such impressive flexibility". Nolan Feenay from Time magazine commented that the dance moves in the video could be the best dance routine of 2014.

"Chandelier" won the ARIA Award for Best Video at the ARIA Music Awards of 2014. The song received nominations at the MTV Video Music Awards for Video of the Year and Best Choreography, and ultimately won the latter. It was also nominated for a 2015 Grammy Award for Best Music Video. The video went viral on YouTube and became the seventh most-watched video on the video-sharing website of 2014. As of September 2025, it has received over 2.8 billion views and was, at one point, the 13th most viewed YouTube video ever. As of January 2015, Billboard ranked the video at number 12 on the list of the 20 best of the 2010s (so far). Both Rolling Stone magazine and Spin magazine named it the Best Music Video of 2014. VH1 listed it first among the "most groundbreaking" videos of 2014. In 2016, several items related to the "Chandelier" video were introduced into the "Right Here, Right Now" exhibit of the Rock and Roll Hall of Fame. In 2018, Billboard ranked the video the 18th best music video of the 21st century.

== Live performances ==
Sia performed "Chandelier" on The Ellen DeGeneres Show on 19 May 2014, with Ziegler recreating the choreography in the music video. Sia also performed the song on Late Night with Seth Meyers on 9 June 2014, with Girls star Lena Dunham performing new choreography. In July 2014, Sia performed the song on Jimmy Kimmel Live!, and Ziegler taught host Jimmy Kimmel and his sidekick Guillermo Rodriguez some of the dance moves from the music video. In July 2014, Sia performed the song on VH1's show "SoundClash", along with her songs "Elastic Heart" and "Big Girls Cry" from the album. Sia sang the song on Dancing with the Stars, with Ziegler dancing a duet with Allison Holker, and at the 2014 We Can Survive Concert at the Hollywood Bowl. In February 2015, Sia sang the song in a cluttered apartment set for the 2015 Grammy Awards telecast, with Ziegler dancing with actress Kristen Wiig. For all of these performances, Sia sang the track with her back to the camera. She performed the song on Saturday Night Live in January 2015, veiled, with a sad-looking mime, Bradley LeConey, who performed the lyrics in ASL.

== Notable covers and parodies ==
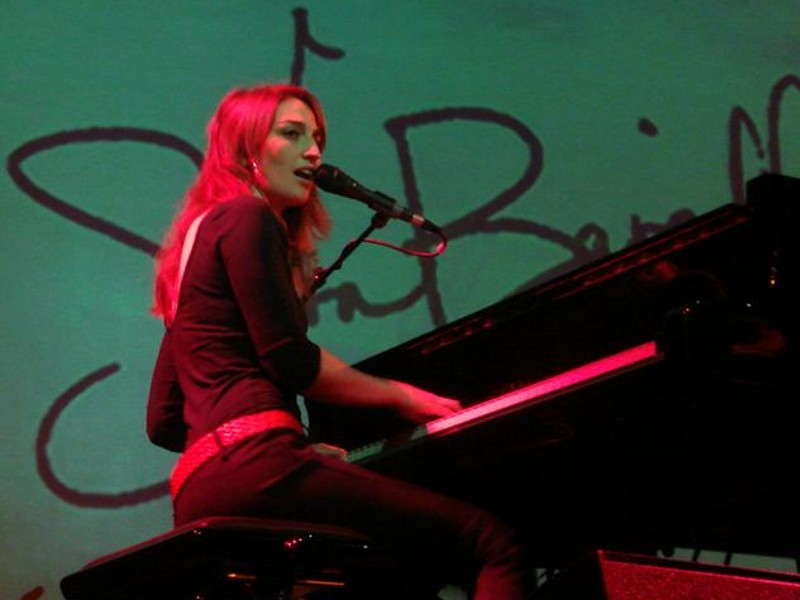
Sara Bareilles (pictured in 2008) covered "Chandelier" on her Little Black Dress Tour in 2014.

In July 2014, Sara Bareilles performed an acoustic version of "Chandelier" during her Little Black Dress Tour. Reut Odinak from the Seattle Weekly lauded Bareilles' vocals on the cover. Likewise, MuchMusic's Evan Desouza wrote that "The song sounds almost [unrecognisable] with the stripped, acoustic cover. Of course no one can match Sia's insane voice, but Sara does a decent job. Her vocals sound amazing".

The song was covered on BBC Radio 1's Live Lounge in September 2014 by Irish band The Script; Music and Lyrics praised the group's three-man harmonies. Loïc Nottet, a Belgian hopeful for the Eurovision Song Contest, released a cover of the song on YouTube in November 2014, later praised by Sia on Twitter. Bareilles and Josh Groban did a parody, called 8 times a week.

Adam Lambert sang the song on his cover album, High Drama.

== Track listing ==
Digital download

1. "Chandelier" – 3:36

Digital download – Remixes EP

1. "Chandelier" (Four Tet Remix) – 4:31
2. "Chandelier" (Plastic Plates Remix) – 4:27
3. "Chandelier" (Cutmore Club Remix) – 5:08
4. "Chandelier" (Hector Fonseca Remix) – 6:27
5. "Chandelier" (Liam Keegan Remix) – 5:16
6. "Chandelier" (Dev Hynes Remix) – 3:44

== Credits and personnel ==
Credits for "Chandelier" are adapted from CD single liner notes

Recording locations

- Vocals recorded at Hot Closet Studios, Echo Park, California
- Engineered at Echo Studios, Los Angeles, California
- Mixed at Larrabee Sound Studios, North Hollywood, California

Personnel

- Songwriter, lead vocals – Sia Furler
- Songwriter – Jesse Shatkin
- Producers – Greg Kurstin, Jesse Shatkin
- Drums, guitar, mellotron, piano – Greg Kurstin
- Drums, keyboards – Jesse Shatkin
- Programming – Jesse Shatkin
- Engineering – Greg Kurstin, Jesse Shatkin
- Additional engineering – Alex Pasco, Delbert Bowers
- Mixing – Manny Marroquin
- Assistant mixing – Chris Galland, Delbert Bowers

== Charts ==
=== Weekly charts ===
Weekly chart performance for "Chandelier"
Chart (2014–2017)	Peak position
Australia (ARIA)	2
Austria (Ö3 Austria Top 40)	2
Belgium (Ultratop 50 Flanders)	8
Belgium (Ultratop 50 Wallonia)	2
Canada Hot 100 (Billboard)	6
Canada AC (Billboard)	35
Canada CHR/Top 40 (Billboard)	8
Canada Hot AC (Billboard)	9
Czech Republic Airplay (ČNS IFPI)	10
Czech Republic Singles Digital (ČNS IFPI)	2
Denmark (Tracklisten)	6
Finland (Suomen virallinen lista)	5
France (SNEP)	1
France Airplay (SNEP)	4
Germany (GfK)	10
Greece Digital Songs (Billboard)	1
Hungary (Single Top 40)	2
Hungary (Stream Top 40)	11
Iceland (RÚV)	6
Ireland (IRMA)	5
Israel International Airplay (Media Forest)	1
Italy (FIMI)	2
Japan Hot 100 (Billboard)	39
Lebanon (Lebanese Top 20)	3
Mexico (Billboard Mexican Airplay)	6
Mexico Anglo (Monitor Latino)	6
Netherlands (Dutch Top 40)	38
Netherlands (Single Top 100)	27
New Zealand (Recorded Music NZ)	3
Norway (VG-lista)	4
Poland Airplay (ZPAV)	1
Portugal (AFP)	58
Romania (Airplay 100)	8
Russia Airplay (TopHit)	3
Scottish Singles Sales (Official Charts)	4
Slovakia Airplay (ČNS IFPI)	17
Slovakia Singles Digital (ČNS IFPI)	3
South Korea (Gaon)	67
Spain (Promusicae)	3
Sweden (Sverigetopplistan)	5
Switzerland (Schweizer Hitparade)	2
Switzerland (Media Control Romandy)	1
UK Singles (Official Charts)	6
Ukraine Airplay (TopHit)	3
US Billboard Hot 100	8
US Adult Contemporary (Billboard)	17
US Adult Pop Airplay (Billboard)	10
US Dance Club Songs (Billboard)	1
US Pop Airplay (Billboard)	11
US Rhythmic Airplay (Billboard)	37

=== Decade-end charts ===
2010s chart rankings for "Chandelier"
Chart (2010–2019)	Position
Australia (ARIA)	42
Australian Artist Singles (ARIA)	5
UK Singles (Official Charts Company)	40

=== Year-end charts ===
Annual chart rankings for "Chandelier"
Chart (2014)	Position
Australia (ARIA)	6
Austria (Ö3 Austria Top 40)	27
Belgium (Ultratop Flanders)	43
Belgium (Ultratop Wallonia)	5
Canada (Canadian Hot 100)	26
Denmark (Tracklisten)	15
France (SNEP)	3
Germany (Official German Charts)	43
Hungary (MAHASZ)	76
Israel (Media Forest)	3
Italy (FIMI)	15
Netherlands (Single Top 100)	56
New Zealand (Recorded Music NZ)	11
Poland (ZPAV)	19
Romania (Airplay 100)	25
Russia Airplay (TopHit)	30
Spain (PROMUSICAE)	13
Sweden (Sverigetopplistan)	15
Switzerland (Schweizer Hitparade)	9
Ukraine Airplay (TopHit)	20
UK Singles (Official Charts Company)	32
US Billboard Hot 100	25
US Adult Top 40 (Billboard)	49
US Hot Dance Club Songs (Billboard)	9
US Pop Airplay (Billboard)	43
Chart (2015)	Position
Australia (ARIA)	94
Belgium (Ultratop 50 Wallonia)	38
Canada (Canadian Hot 100)	62
CIS (TopHit)	43
Denmark (Tracklisten)	94
Hungary (MAHASZ)	44
Italy (FIMI)	31
Russia Airplay (TopHit)	45
Spain (PROMUSICAE)	37
Sweden (Sverigetopplistan)	73
Switzerland (Schweizer Hitparade)	48
Ukraine Airplay (TopHit)	37
UK Singles (Official Charts Company)	42
US Billboard Hot 100	90
Chart (2016)	Position
Hungary (MAHASZ)	73
South Korean International Singles (Gaon)	100
UK Singles (Official Charts Company)	81
Chart (2019)	Position
South Korea (Gaon)	189

== Certifications ==
Region	Certification	Certified units/sales
Australia (ARIA)	5× Platinum	350,000^{^}
Austria (IFPI Austria)	Gold	15,000^{*}
Belgium (BRMA)	2× Platinum	60,000^{*}
Canada (Music Canada)	Diamond	800,000^{‡}
Denmark (IFPI Danmark)	3× Platinum	270,000^{‡}
France (SNEP)	Diamond	233,333^{‡}
Germany (BVMI)	3× Gold	900,000^{‡}
Italy (FIMI)	5× Platinum	250,000^{‡}
Mexico (AMPROFON)	3× Diamond	900,000^{‡}
New Zealand (RMNZ)	6× Platinum	180,000^{‡}
Norway (IFPI Norway)	5× Platinum	50,000^{‡}
South Korea	—	2,500,000
Spain (Promusicae)	4× Platinum	240,000^{‡}
Sweden (GLF)	4× Platinum	160,000^{‡}
Switzerland (IFPI Switzerland)	Platinum	30,000^{^}
United Kingdom (BPI)	5× Platinum	3,000,000^{‡}
United States (RIAA)	Diamond	10,000,000^{‡}
Streaming
Denmark (IFPI Danmark)	2× Platinum	5,200,000^{†}
Japan (RIAJ)	Gold	50,000,000^{†}
Spain (Promusicae)	Platinum	8,000,000^{†}
^{*} Sales figures based on certification alone.^{^} Shipments figures based on certification alone.^{‡} Sales+streaming figures based on certification alone.^{†} Streaming-only figures based on certification alone.

== Release history ==
Region	Release date	Format	Label	Ref.
Belgium	17 March 2014	Digital download	Monkey Puzzle; RCA	
Brazil	17 March 2014	Digital download	Monkey Puzzle; RCA	
France	17 March 2014	Digital download	Monkey Puzzle; RCA	
Norway	17 March 2014	Digital download	Monkey Puzzle; RCA	
Portugal	17 March 2014	Digital download	Monkey Puzzle; RCA	
Spain	17 March 2014	Digital download	Monkey Puzzle; RCA	
Sweden	17 March 2014	Digital download	Monkey Puzzle; RCA	
United States	17 March 2014	Digital download	Monkey Puzzle; RCA	
Australia	18 March 2014	Digital download	Inertia	
United Kingdom	29 June 2014	Digital download	Monkey Puzzle; RCA	
United States	30 June 2014	Hot adult contemporary	RCA	
Belgium	22 July 2014	Digital remixes EP	Monkey Puzzle; RCA	
Brazil	22 July 2014	Digital remixes EP	Monkey Puzzle; RCA	
Canada	22 July 2014	Digital remixes EP	Monkey Puzzle; RCA	
Germany	22 July 2014	Digital remixes EP	Monkey Puzzle; RCA	
Norway	22 July 2014	Digital remixes EP	Monkey Puzzle; RCA	
Switzerland	22 July 2014	Digital remixes EP	Monkey Puzzle; RCA	
United States	22 July 2014	Digital remixes EP	Monkey Puzzle; RCA	
Australia	25 July 2014	Digital remixes EP	Inertia	
New Zealand	25 July 2014	Digital remixes EP	Inertia	
Italy	25 July 2014	Contemporary hit radio	Monkey Puzzle	

== See also ==
- Billboard Year-End Hot 100 singles of 2014
- List of best-selling singles in Australia
- List of best-selling singles in Germany
- List of best-selling singles in Mexico
- List of best-selling singles in Spain
- List of Billboard Dance Club Songs number ones of 2014
- List of Billboard Hot 100 top-ten singles in 2014
- List of most-streamed songs on Spotify
- List of number-one dance singles of 2014 (U.S.)
- List of number-one hits of 2014 (France)
- List of number-one singles of 2014 (Poland)
- List of top 10 singles in 2014 (Australia)
- List of top 10 singles in 2014 (France)
- List of top 25 singles for 2014 in Australia
- List of top 100 singles of 2014 (France)
- List of UK top-ten singles in 2014
- New Zealand top 50 singles of 2014
- Triple J Hottest 100, 2014
