= Balti (singer) =

Tunisian singer (born 1980)

- بلطي
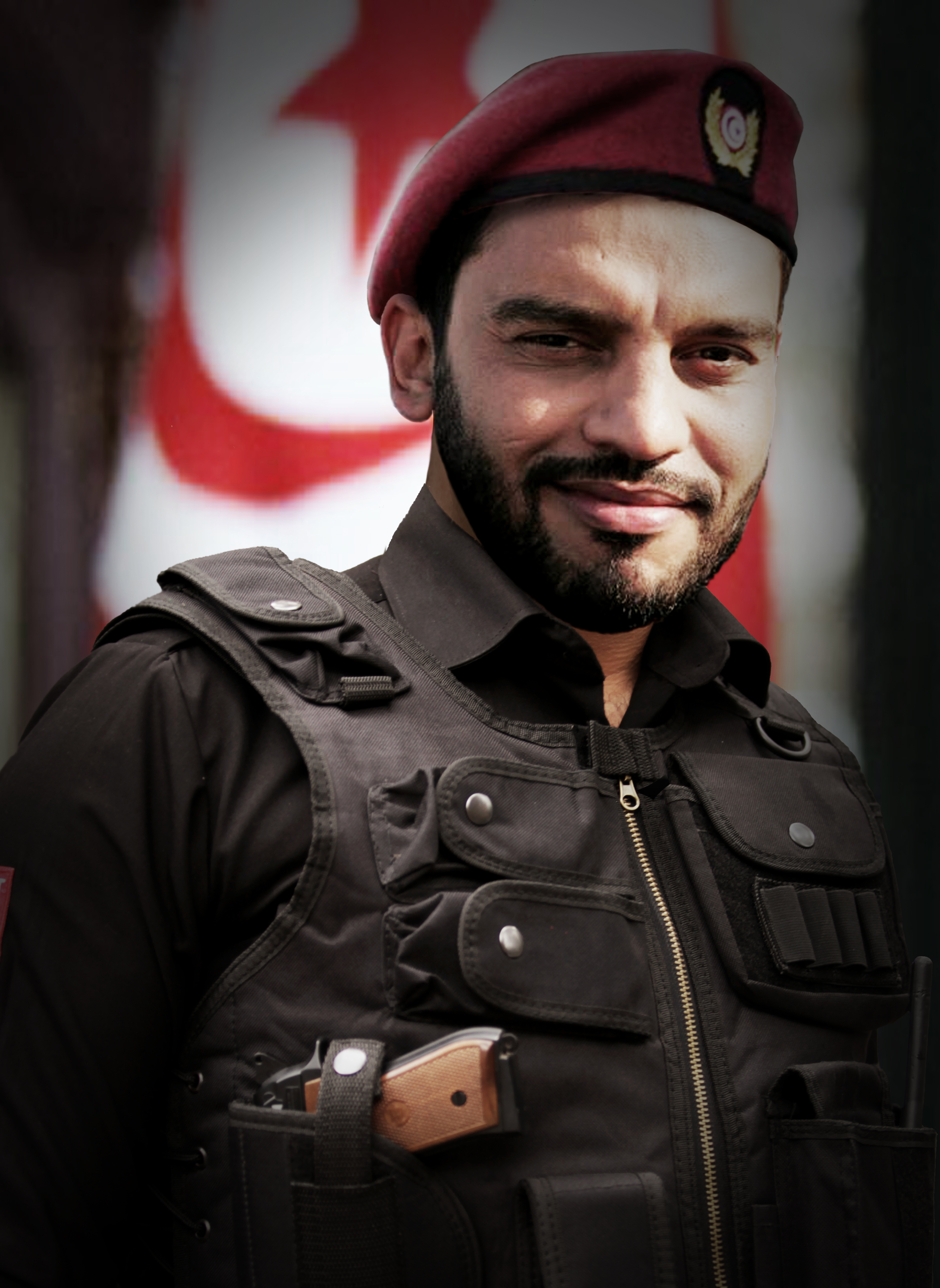
- Balti in the uniform of the Anti-Terrorism Brigade
- Born: Mohamed Salah Balti محمد صالح بلطي; April 10, 1980 (age 46); Tunis, Tunisia
- Other name: Dragon Balti
- Occupations: Singer-songwriter; rapper; producer
- Years active: 2002–present
- Musical career
- Origin: Tunis, Tunisia
- Genres: Rap; R&B; pop
- Instrument: Vocals

Mohamed Salah Balti (Tunisian Arabic: محمد صالح بلطي; born April 10, 1980) is a Tunisian singer, rapper, composer, and music producer.

== Biography ==
Mohamed Salah Balti began his musical career with the group Wled Bled. In 2002 he started to become known on the Tunisian scene through an unofficial album with DJ Danjer.

In 2003, he wrote, composed and performed three pieces for the soundtrack of Tunisian director Mohamed Zranes film "The Prince" a fourth song was featured in the end credits of the film.

From 2004 through 2009, he gave concerts throughout Tunisia as well as in Europe. On these tours he performed with names such as Rohff, Tandem, FactorX, Sinik, Cheb Slim and Diam's. In Germany he performed with names like Methodman and Redman.

In 2008, he formed the group X tension. With this group he also released his first official album "Our World in Real". These two concerts are organized by Radio Libre de Tunisie.

In 2017, he released a single called "Ya Lili'". The song is a duet with the young Tunisian talented boy Hammouda. The clip posted on YouTube has a record number of views ever recorded in Tunisia and the Arab world, and made Balti more well-known in the region. It was also a breakthrough for Hammouda for the Tunisian audience.

== Discography ==
=== Songs ===
- 2005: "Harka" (with Mastaziano)
- 2008: "Mamma"
- 2008: "Alamat Essaa (with Anis Dridi)
- 2009: "Chneya dhanbi"
- 2010: "Passe partout"
- 2010: "Layem"
- 2011: "Mouwaten Karim"
- 2011: "Ici ou là-bas" (with Mister You)
- 2011: "Akadhib"
- 2011: "Jey mel rif lel assima"
- 2012: "Stop violence" (directed by Malek Ben Gaied Hassine)
- 2012: "Yatim" (directed by Borhen Ben Hassouna)
- 2012: "Meskina"
- 2012: "Témoin suicide" (directed by Malek Ben Gaied Hassine)
- 2014: "Kill Somebody" (directed by Malek Ben Gaied Hassine)
- 2014: "Douza Douza" (with Zied Nigro)
- 2015: "Chafouni Zawali" (with Akram Mag)
- 2015: "Stagoutay"
- 2015: "Sahara"
- 2015: "Galouli Matji" (with Zina El Gasrinia)
- 2015: "Mama j'suis là" (with DJ Meyz & Tunisiano)
- 2015: "Skerti Rawhi"
- 2015: "Houma Theb Etoub"
- 2016: "Hala Mala"
- 2016: "Erakh lé" (with Mister You)
- 2016: "Désolé" (with Walid Tounssi)
- 2016: "Harba"
- 2016: "Clandestino" (with Master Sina)
- 2017: "Wala Lela"
- 2017: "Maztoula"
- 2017: "Khaliha ala rabi"
- 2017: "Law Le3ebti Ya Zahr" (with Zaza)
- 2017: "Ya Lili" (with Hamouda)
- 2018: "Khalini Nrou9"
- 2019: "Maghrébins" (with Mister You)
- 2019: "Bouhali"
- 2019: "Denia" (with Hamouda)
- 2019: "Haha"
- 2019: "Filamen"
- 2020: "Valise"
- 2020: "Oulala"
- 2020: "Mawal"
- 2021: "Ya Hasra"
- 2021: "7elma"
- 2021: "Ena"
- 2022: "Ghareeb Alay" (with Elyanna)
- 2022: "Allo"
- 2022: "Amirti"
- 2023: "Dima Mechi"
- 2023: "Saber"
