= Ya Lili =

Single by Balti and Hamouda
- Released: October 28, 2017
- Genre: African hip-hop; trap
- Length: 3:21
- Songwriter: Balti
- Producers: Balti; Habibzgang

Balti and Hamouda singles chronology
"Law Le3ebti Ya Zahr" (2017)	"Ya Lili" (2017)	"Khalini Nrou9" (2018)

"Ya Lili" (يا ليلي, lit. 'O My Night') is a song by Tunisian rapper Balti released in 2017. It features a boy named Hamouda who sings the chorus "from the point of view of a child trying to share his feelings with a dismissive mother".

The song became a hit in the Maghreb region and as of April 2024 had gained over 700 million views on YouTube. It is the most viewed video by a Tunisian artist on the platform.

In 2018, the song was nominated for the All Africa Music Award (AFRIMA) in the Best African Collaboration category, but lost to "Akwaaba" by Ghanaian artists GuiltyBeatz, Mr. Eazi, Patappa & Pappy Kojo.

In 2024, the music magazine Rolling Stone listed the song at number 36 in its list of "the 50 best Arabic pop songs of the 21st century".
