= Kader Japonais =

Kader Japonais عبد القادر هيباوي
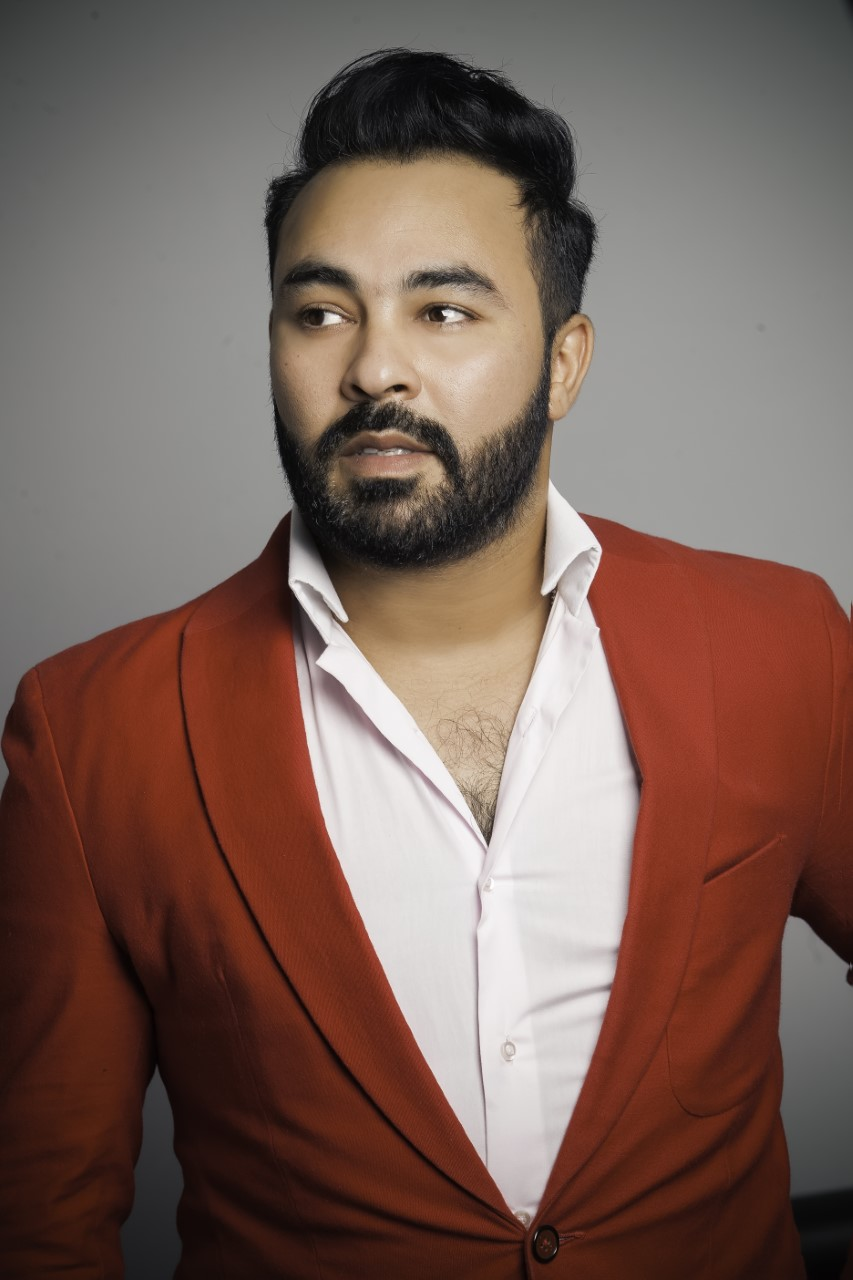

Background information
- Born: Abdelkader Hibaoui; 11 March 1979 (age 47); Algiers, Algeria
- Genres: Raï; pop
- Occupations: Musician; singer
- Years active: 2001–present
- Website: kaderjap.com

Abdel Kader Haiboui (Arabic: عبد القادر هيباوي; born March 11, 1979), better known as Kader Japonais, (Arabic: كادير الجابوني or قادر جابوني) is an Algerian Raï singer and production artist. He was born in the neighborhood of Bab-El-Oued, Algiers, Algeria.

He gained fame in the 2000s for the single "Jibou la Brigade" and again in the 2010s for the singles "Nti Sbabi" and "Waalach". He sings and speaks in Algerian Arabic and sometimes in French or Eastern Arabic dialects.

His music blends raï with chaabi, Arabic pop and other musical styles of the Maghreb. Kader's songs range from slow-paced sentimental love songs to fast-paced dance songs.

In interviews, Kader stated that he graduated with a law degree but was unable to find work in his field, so he began singing to help himself out of poverty.

The use of "Japonais" in his stage name means Japanese. It was originally a nickname he received due to his eyes, which seem to have an epicanthic fold perceived to be similar to Japanese people. Early in his career, Kader decided to adopt this nickname and incorporated it into his official stage name.

At the age of 18, he had performed at nightclubs in Algiers, and later expanded his performances to other Algerian towns such as Oran and Constantine.

Later, he participated in international music festivals within the Maghreb, at events in Timgad, Sidi Bel Abbès, Djemila, Alger, at the Mawazine festival in Rabat, Oujda, and Casablanca, at the Khiwa festival in Hammamet, at the Kasserine festival, and the World Festival of Black Arts in Senegal.

Outside of Africa, he received attention in France during his annual performances at the Zénith de Paris for la nuit du Raï and at the festival du Raï in Toulouse as well as for the festival du Monde Arabe in Montreal.

== Collaborations ==
Among the collaborations of Kader Japonais with other artists were those with Cheb Nasro, Rim'K of 113 (on "On reste fiers"), Lartiste, DJ Hamida, DJ Kayz, DJ Kim, L'Algerino, Kayline and Zina Daoudia.

== Singles ==
- Jibou la brigade ou zidou central
- Nti Sbabi
- Waalach
- On reste fiers (with Rim-K)
- Ehki ya zman

== Albums ==
- 2001: first album
- 2006: La brigade (Dounia)
- 2008: Mania (Dounia)
- 2009: Haba Haba (Dounia)
- 2010: Bafana Bafana (Dounia)
- 2011: Blèbik, Mamamia (Dounia)
- 2012: Ndir El Courage, Adabek Nti Bizarre
- 2013: Djarhi ma bra' (Dounia)
- 2014: Bassik m"aya (Villa Prod)
- 2015: Mami Mami (Villa Prod)
- 2016: Hkaya (Villa Prod)
- 2017: Raki Nedmana
- 2018: Holm (Villa Prod)
