= Déconnectés =

Single by DJ Hamida featuring Kayna Samet, Rim'K and Lartiste

from the album À la bien mix party 2014
- Released: 16 May 2014
- Recorded: 2013–2014
- Songwriter(s): Youssef Akdim, Abdelkrim Brahim, Jean A Salimier, Reynald Salimier, Malika Zoubir

Music video
- "Déconnectés" on YouTube

"Déconnectés" (French pronunciation: [dekɔnɛkte]) is a 2014 single by French-Moroccan DJ and record producer DJ Hamida, taken from À La Bien Mix Party 2014. It features vocals by Kayna Samet, Rim'K (of band 113) and Lartiste.

The track was the main release from the 2014 DJ Hamida album À la bien mix party 2014 reaching number 14 on SNEP official French Singles Chart totalling 14 weeks (until end of August 2014).

== Charts ==
=== Weekly charts ===
Chart (2014)	Peak position
Belgium (Ultratip Bubbling Under Wallonia)	7
France (SNEP)	14

=== Year-end charts ===
Chart (2014)	Position
France (SNEP)	90
