= Varoom =

Varoom may refer to:

- Varoom!, a 1963 pop art painting by Roy Lichtenstein
- "(Varoom!)", a 1992 song by Stereolab from the EP Low Fi
- Varoom (Pokémon), a Pokémon species

== See also ==
- Vroom (disambiguation)
