= Chocolat (song) =

2017 single by Lartiste

Single by Lartiste featuring Awa Imani

from the album Clandestino
- Released: 17 February 2017
- Genre: French hip hop, dance-pop
- Length: 4:22
- Label: Because
- Songwriters: Jo Rafa; Lartiste; Awa Imani
- Producer: Jo Rafa

Lartiste featuring Awa Imani singles chronology
"Bye Bye Baby" (2016)	"Chocolat" (2017)	"Pardonner" (2017)

Music video
- "Chocolat" on YouTube

"Chocolat" is a song by Lartiste featuring vocals from Awa Imani. The song peaked at number three in France and was Lartiste's most successful single until Mafiosa in 2018. The lyrics discuss racism against black women in France. As of June 2025, the music video has over 540 million views.

== Charts ==
Chart performance for "Chocolat"
Chart	Peak position
Belgium (Ultratip Bubbling Under Flanders)	11
Belgium (Ultratop 50 Wallonia)	13
France (SNEP)	3
Switzerland (Schweizer Hitparade)	75

== Certifications ==
Region	Certification	Certified units/sales
Belgium (BRMA)	Gold	10,000^{‡}
France (SNEP)	Diamond	233,333^{‡}
^{‡} Sales+streaming figures based on certification alone.
