= Je t'aimais, je t'aime, je t'aimerai =

1994 song by Francis Cabrel

"Je t'aimais, je t'aime, je t'aimerai" ("I have loved you, I love you and I will love you") is a well-known song by French singer and songwriter Francis Cabrel. It is considered his most definitive song, alongside his other classic "Je l'aime à mourir". The song was written by Cabrel and is taken from his 1994 album Samedi soir sur la terre, which was released in 1994 and is Cabrel's biggest selling album. The song was produced by Gérard Bikialo.

== Covers ==
The song have been covered many times and translated into other languages. Recorded versions include those by France Gall, Iris Jenkins and Amandine Bourgeois.

In 2012, it was interpreted by Aude Henneville during her blind audition on the French music competition The Voice: la plus belle voix. Her version charted on SNEP, the French Singles Chart reaching number 91.

In 2016, the French singer Axel Tony released his own version of the song.

In 2016, French Algerian singer Najim released a bilingual French-Arabic version.
