= Lvbel C5 =

Turkish rapper (born 2001)

Süleyman Burak Bodur
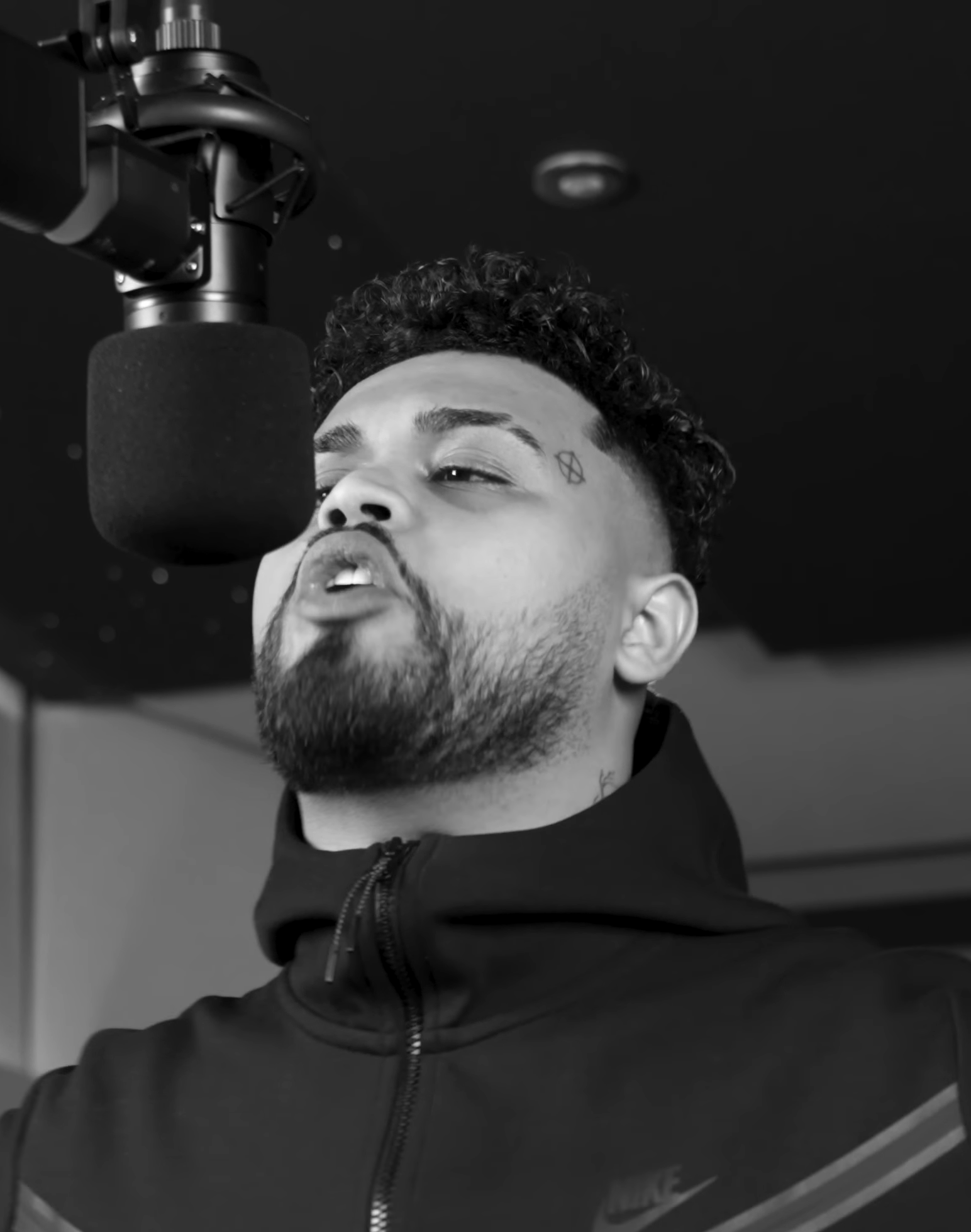

Background information
- Also known as: Lvbel C5
- Born: April 20, 2001 (age 25); Sakarya, Turkey
- Origin: Sakarya, Turkey
- Genres: Rap
- Years active: 2019-present

Süleyman Burak Bodur, better known as Lvbel C5 (born 20 April 2001, Sakarya), is a Turkish rapper and lyricist. He started his career in 2019 with the song Face Time, which he released with Batuflex. In 2025, his songs HAVHAVHAV and COOOK PARDON garnered media attention. HAVHAVHAV was widely criticized. On May 6, 2025, he was arrested for promoting drug use in his songs, but was later released.
