= Bang Bang (Lartiste song) =

Single by Lartiste

from the album Fenómeno
- Released: May 22, 2015
- Recorded: 2014
- Length: 3:18
- Label: Nu Deal
- Songwriter(s): DR.; Youssef Akdim
- Producer(s): DR.; Youssef Akdim

Lartiste singles chronology
"Polygame" (2015)	"Bang Bang" (2015)	"Destination Finale" (2015)

Music video
- Bang Bang on YouTube

"Bang Bang" is a song by French singer Lartiste, released on May 22, 2015 as him studio album Fenómeno.

== Music video ==
As of November 2022, the music video for Bang Bang had over 25 million views on YouTube.

== Charts ==
Chart (2015)	Peak position
France (SNEP)	144
