= TiiwTiiw =

Moroccan-Belgian singer

- Born: Iliass Barni; July 23, 1992 (age 33); Brussels, Belgium
- Genres: Raï
- Occupations: Record producer, singer
- Years active: Since 2008
- Formerly of: Dakka Marrakchia

Iliass Barni (Arabic: إلياس, born 23 July, 1992), better known by his stage name TiiwTiiw, is a Moroccan-Belgian Raï singer and producer. Popular within the Moroccan community in Belgium, he gained recognition between 2008 and 2014 in Brussels with his Dakka Marrakchia group known as Dakka TiiwTiiw. He later dedicated himself to a singing career, collaborating with international artists like Lacrim, Morad and Mister You. He is one of the most influential artists in the Maghreb region, thanks to his style, and has gained notoriety on YouTube and on stage at festivals in Belgium and beyond.

== Career ==
Iliass Bami was born in Brussels to Moroccan parents from the Rif region. Passionate about raï and dakka marrakchia with an influence from Michael Jackson, he grew up in the municipality of Sint-Pieters-Leeuw and surrounded himself with several Brussels musicians. With them, he launched his career as a mascot member of a dakka marrakchia group, a folk group producing Moroccan music. At the age of 16, he began appearing at several Moroccan weddings in various municipalities of Brussels as a musician performing dakka marrakchia in a group. Between 2010 and 2014, Dakka Tiiwtiiw rose to the top of the wedding hall circuit across Belgium and the Netherlands.

In 2008, following the Moroccan team's victory against the Red Devils of Belgium with a score of 4–1, he created one of his first hits with Redouane La Deglingue and Saad, two rappers from Schaerbeek, titled "Bruxaghreb", a song to celebrate Morocco's victory. Achieving huge success, the track was included on the album Platinum Hit Parade by Ol Kainry and Sabah before Tiiwtiiw set up his own studio in Forest to self-produce with several Belgian artists, including producers and directors.

Since 2015, Iliass TiiwTiiw has released a summer album titled Dream Tiiw every year, featuring numerous Moroccan artists and French rappers. His singles regularly top the trending videos in Morocco on YouTube. He has collaborated with several French rappers including Naza, Mister You, L'Algérino, and Lacrim. TiiwTiiw has also been featured in the media in France. Belgium, the Netherlands, and Germany. His hits are regularly played on the FunX platform in the Netherlands.

On 30 June 2018, TiiwTiiw performed at the Mawazine Festival in front of a large audience in Morocco. In 2020, he released his first solo album: Khosé and was one of the headliners at ManiFiesta. On June 6, 2021, he released another single titled Frontera Nada in collaboration with Spanish-Moroccan rapper Morad. On June 21, 2020, he released his first single sung in French, "Folle de lui" in collaboration with French rapper Lacrim. It accumulated around tens of millions of views.

== Discography ==
=== Studio albums ===
- 2015: Dream Tiiw
- 2016: Dream Tiiw
- 2017: Dream Tiiw
- 2020: Khosé
