= Rim'K =

French-Algerian rapper (born 1978)

Background information
- Born: Abdelkrim Brahmi; 21 June 1978 (age 48); Paris, France
- Genres: Hip hop; political hip hop
- Occupation: Rapper
- Years active: 1994–present

Abdelkrim Brahmi (born 21 June 1978 in Paris, France), known professionally as Rim'K, is a French rapper of Algerian origins. Rim'k is a member of the group 113, alongside Mokobé and AP, and the supergroup Mafia K-1 Fry. He also has a group called Maghreb United.

== Biography ==
Rim'K was raised in the Parisian suburb of Vitry-sur-Seine. His family is originally from Barbacha, Algeria, which is mentioned many times in his lyrics.

Having been innovative in many musical aspects, such as the introduction of Maghrebian folk rhythms in rap, Rim'K thus remains one of the major figures of the French-speaking rap scene.

His musical success, which can be explained both in the quality of his art and in his artistic finds, also comes from the fact that Rim'K is perceived as a link linking the Maghreb to France, and that his longevity in music has made him a father figure to many French rap listeners.

Rim'K performed in the 2024 Summer Olympics opening ceremony.

== Discography ==
=== Albums ===
Solo

Year	Title	Charts		
Year	Title	FR	BEL (Wa)	SWI
2004	L'enfant du pays	8	—	—
2007	Famille nombreuse	20	88	—
2009	Maghreb United	7	—	—
2012	Chef de famille	10	100	—
2016	Monster Tape	7	13	—
2017	Fantôme	6	13	47
2018	Mutant	6	20	84

with 113

- 1998 : Ni Barreaux, Ni Barrières, Ni Frontières (EP)
- 1999 : Les Princes De La Ville
- 2002 : 113 Fout La Merde
- 2003 : 113 Dans L'urgence
- 2005 : 113 Degrés
- 2006 : Illégal Radio (hosted by 113)
- 2010 : Universel

with Mafia K'1 Fry

- 2003 : La cerise sur le ghetto
- 2007 : Jusqu'à la mort
- 2007 : Jusqu'à la mort re-edition

=== EPs ===
Year	Title	Charts	
Year	Title	FR	BEL (Wa)
2008	Club E.P	8	—
2021	ADN	13	75

=== Singles ===
Year	Title	Charts			Album
Year	Title	FR	BEL (Wa)	NZ Hot	Album
2004	"Rachid System" (feat. Cheba Zahouania)	35	—	—	
2008	"Clandestino"	25	—	—	
2009	"United" (feat. Nourou & Mohamed Allaoua)	—	—	—	
2015	"Everyday" (feat. Rich Homie Quan)	55	—	—	Monster Tape
2016	"Cellophané"	132	—	—	
2018	"Air Max" (feat. Ninho)	1	28	—	Mutant
2019	"Turbo"	64	—	—	
2020	"Valise" (feat. Koba LaD and SCH)	46	—	17	
2021	"Papel" (with Morad)	36	—	—	Non-album release
2025	"Run" (with SDM)	11	42	—	Non-album release

=== Other charted songs ===
Year	Title	Charts	Album
Year	Title	FR	Album
2012	"Call of Bitume" (feat. Booba)	72	Chef de famille
2016	"Vida loca" (feat. Lartiste)	146	Monster Tape
2016	"Paris la nuit" (feat. Nekfeu)	161	Monster Tape
2016	"Pattaya" (with AP du 113)	102	Monster Tape
2017	"Rien de lavable" (feat. SCH)	70	Fantôme
2017	"Room Service"	103	Fantôme
2017	"Personne"	123	Fantôme
2017	"500€"	126	Fantôme
2017	"Fantôme"	134	Fantôme
2017	"No Future" (feat. S.Pri Noir)	166	Fantôme
2017	"Mama nostra" (feat. Lartiste)	183	Fantôme
2017	"Contrefaçon"	189	Fantôme
2018	"Fratello"	147	Mutant
2018	"Immigri" (feat. YL)	165	Mutant
2018	"Drugstore"	168	Mutant
2018	"Delorean" (feat. Vald)	174	Mutant
2018	"911" (feat. Alonzo)	181	Mutant
2018	"Insomnie"	186	Mutant
2018	"Dans le ciel"	198	Mutant
2020	"Rose rouge" (with Dadju)	51	
2020	"Warning"	133	
2020	"Nuit blanche" (feat. Hamza)	158	
2021	"Cosmos" (feat. PLK)	7	
2021	"Benzo"	26	ADN
2021	"Prototype"	58	ADN
2021	"Hood"	60	ADN
2021	"Confiance"	61	ADN
2021	"Cheval blanc"	74	ADN
2021	"ADN"	79	ADN

=== Featured in ===
Year	Title	Charts	Album
Year	Title	FR	Album
2014	"Déconnectés" (DJ Hamida feat. Kayna Samet, Rim'K & Lartiste)	23	DJ Hamida mix album À la bien mix party 2014
2014	"Jnouné" (DJ Kayz feat. Rim'k, Jul & Dieselle)	176	NRJ Party Hits 2014 Vol. 2
2015	"Mehlia (c'est fini)" (DJ Hamida feat. Rim'K & Kayna Samet)	136	DJ Hamida mix album Mix party 2015
2017	"Capritour" (Hooss feat. Rim'K)	167	
2017	"Le sens des affaires" (Naps feat. Rim'K)	116	
2019	"Tu déconnes" (Leto feat. Rim'K)	125	Leto album Trap$tar 2
2019	"Solitude" (Leto feat. Rim'K)	96	SCH album Rooftop
2020	"Yellow" (Caballero & Jeanjass feat. Rim'K)	161	Caballero & Jeanjass album High & fines herbes
2020	"Toutes générations" (PLK feat. Rim'K)	20	PLK album Enna
2021	"Brrr" (Vladimir Cauchemar, Asdek & Laylow feat. Rim'K)	77	
