= A Toz =

Single by Farid & Oussama featuring Aymane Serhani
- Released: 16 February 2015
- Recorded: 2014
- Genre: Pop, Rap
- Length: 2:58
- Label: Juston Records / Musicast
- Songwriter(s): Farid Ben Salah; Oussama El Fatmi

Farid & Oussama singles chronology
"A Toz" (2015)

Aymane Serhani singles chronology
"A Toz" (2015)

Music video
- "A Toz" on YouTube

"A Toz" is a humorous French novelty rap song by the duo Farid & Oussama featuring Aymane Serhani. The song is bilingual in French and North African Arabic dialect. Farid & Oussama is a comics duo with a number of releases online and is made up of Farid Ben Salah and Oussama El Fatmi.

The track "A Toz" gained huge popularity online and was released as a single in February 2015 on Juston Records / Musicast reaching number 12 on SNEP, the French Official Singles Chart and reaching the Top 20 on Ultratop Wallonia, the Official French Belgian (Wallonia) Music Charts.

== Track listing ==
1. "A Toz" (Farid & Oussama feat. Aymane Serhani) - 2:58

== Charts ==
Chart (2015)	Peak position
Belgium (Ultratop 50 Wallonia)	20
France (SNEP)	12
