= Mafiosa (song) =

2018 single by Lartiste

Single by Lartiste featuring Caroliina

from the album Grandestino
- Released: 2018
- Length: 3:19
- Songwriters: Lartiste; Caroliina; Ahmed Akdim
- Producer: Ahmed Akdim

Lartiste singles chronology
"Vai et viens" (2018)	"Mafiosa" (2018)	"GB" (2018)

Music video
- "Mafiosa" on YouTube

"Mafiosa" is a song by Lartiste featuring vocals from Brazilian singer Caroliina. The song peaked at number two in France and was Lartiste's highest-charting song.

== Charts ==
Chart performance for "Mafiosa"
Chart	Peak position
Belgium (Ultratip Bubbling Under Flanders)	–
Belgium (Ultratop 50 Wallonia)	6
France (SNEP)	2
Portugal (AFP)	1
Switzerland (Schweizer Hitparade)	38

== Certifications ==
Region	Certification	Certified units/sales
France (SNEP)	Diamond	333,333^{‡}
^{‡} Sales+streaming figures based on certification alone.
