= Vroom =

Onomatopoeia for sound of engine revving

"Vroom" sounds
A race car engine revving

Vroom is an onomatopoeia that represents the sound of an engine revving up. It also describes the act of purposefully operating a motor vehicle at high speeds so as to create loud engine noises. The word is a common early childhood sound, and is used in speech therapy techniques. It is also an example of a cross-linguistic onomatopoeia.

== Origins ==
According to the Merriam-Webster Online Dictionary, the first instance of "vroom" appearing in text was in 1965. Its origin is traced to the United States of America.

== Role in language development ==
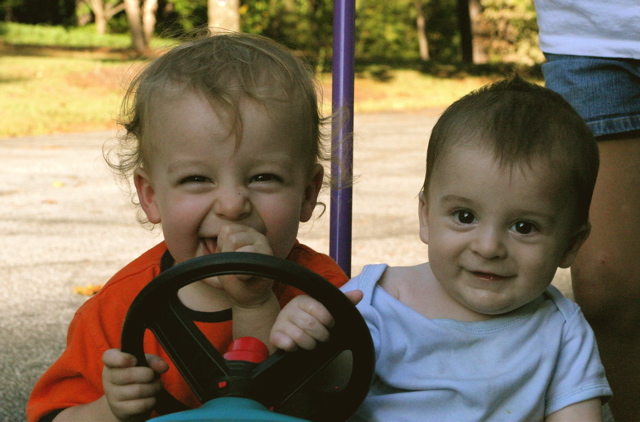
Children playing in a push car. An instance where "vroom" may be used during play in early language development

"Vroom" is cited in early childhood language development texts as an example of a common early word or sound made by young children in the course of play. Anthony D. Pellegrini writes in the chapter "Interpreting Children's Play" in the book The Puzzling Child: From Recognition to Treatment (1982):

The social phonological play of two year olds is exemplified by use of conventional noises, through syllable repetition, to identify actions, events, and objects...Two children may be playing parallel or associatively with trucks. Their phonological play would be the vroom sound of truck engines

Julia Gillen further elaborates in the book The Language of Children (2003) that "vroom" and similar sound noises are the earliest examples of speech development:

However, you might look particularly at the accompaniment of words with actions. "Vroom vroom" is a good example…We might not count this as an early word at all; it might be used by a child who is not yet using words but who is consistently using certain vocalization to express specific intentions of feelings.

=== Speech therapy ===
The word is also used as a tool in treating children with articulation and phonological disorders. Dennis M. Ruscello writes in the book Treating Articulation and Phonological Disorders in Children (2008):

The clinician should encourage vocalizations that can be carried out in the context of body movement or activity. For instance, a client can pair vocalization with play. The clinician and client might play with a favorite toy such as a car and make a vroom sound while playing.

== Other languages ==
"Vroom" is an example of a cross-linguistic onomatopoeia, in that its pronunciation and imitative qualities are consistent throughout many different languages. The word is often reduplicated, hence vroom vroom, etc.

=== Examples ===
- In Batak, ngong, ngooongngng ...
- In Catalan, rum, rumm
- In Czech, brmmm
- In Danish, vrum, brum, nøn
- In Dutch, broem, vroem
- In English, vroom, broom, or brrm; the latter two are chiefly British
- In Finnish, vruum, bruum, prööm (spoken)
- In French, vroum
- In German, brumm, wrumm
- In Italian, brum
- In Hebrew, rum or rom
- In Hungarian, brum, brumm
- In Korean, bureung 부릉
- In Polish, brym, brum
- In Portuguese, vruum
- In Romanian, vrum
- In Spanish, run
- In Slovenian, brum
- In Swedish, brum
- In Thai bruen บรึ๊น
- In Turkish, vrum (truck), han (car)
- In Vietnamese, bờ rừm
- In Indonesian, ngeng
