= Leck (rapper) =

French Rapper (born 1988)

- Born: Fouad; 31 December 1988 (age 37); Vitry-sur-Seine, France
- Origin: Moroccan
- Genres: Hip hop
- Occupations: Rapper, singer, songwriter
- Instrument: Vocals
- Years active: 2005 – present
- Labels: Triumphal Music; Believe Recordings
- Website: www.leckofficiel.com

Fouad El Ouazzani (born 31 December 1988 in Vitry-sur-Seine), better known by his stage name Leck (also stylised L.E.C.K.) is a French rapper of Moroccan origin signed to Believe Recordings.

== Discography ==
=== Albums ===
Year	Album	Charts		Certification
Year	Album	BEL (Wa)	FR	Certification
2013	Je suis vous	71	27	
2014	Noir	–	131	

=== Singles ===
Year	Single	Charts	Album
Year	Single	France	Album
2012	"XPTDR" (featuring Mister V)	63	Je suis vous
2014	"Boîte vocale"	189	Noir
2015	"On Time" (featuring Tyga)	12	TBA
2017	"Yarale"	194	TBA
