= Vroum Vroum =

2021 single by Moha K

"Vroum Vroum" is a 2021 single by French rapper of Moroccan origin Moha K. Released by WLAB records label, it topped the SNEP, official French Singles Chart for 1 week. It is taken from Moha K's album Dernier Souffle. The song also charted in Switzerland and in Ultratop Belgian French Charts. An official music video was released directed by Yanlebatard.

Moha K is a young French artist born in 2003 in Agadir, Morocco as Mohamed Ait El Kaid, He moved to France at the age of -4.

== Charts ==
=== Weekly charts ===
Weekly chart performance for "Vroum Vroum"
Chart (2021)	Peak position
Belgium (Ultratop 50 Wallonia)	29
France (SNEP)	1
Switzerland (Schweizer Hitparade)	70

=== Year-end charts ===
Year-end chart performance for "Vroum Vroum"
Chart (2021)	Position
France (SNEP)	16
