= Mister You =

French-Moroccan rapper (born 1984)

- Also known as: Mister You
- Born: Younes Latifi; 5 February 1984 (age 42); Paris, France
- Genres: Hip hop, French hip hop
- Occupations: Rapper, singer
- Years active: Since 2003
- Labels: No Time Records; Mercury Records

Younes Latifi (French pronunciation: [junɛs latiˈfi]; Arabic: يونس لطيفي; born 5 February, 1984), better known by his stage name Mister You, is a French rapper of Moroccan descent known for his freestyles.

== Career ==
Born in Paris, he was raised in the Belleville area of the capital city. He lived in the south of France trying to make a career in music. His first official album was in December 2009 entitled Présumé coupable (meaning Presumed guilty). When in 2009, the French police issued a warrant for assistance in his arrest, he gave an interview in October 2009 daring them to stop him. He accompanied that with a defiant underground indie album entitled Arrête You si tu peux (meaning Catch You if you can in French).

Mister You has released new materials including mixtape and street album M.D.R. (or Mec De Rue) that incorporated cooperations with various rappers like Brutus & Lacrim, Tunisiano, Zesau and others and was released on 25 October 2010. It proved to be his biggest commercial success reaching #9 on the official French Albums Chart. Based on that success, he released a music video for "Les p'tits de chez moi", in duo with Mimma Mendhy.

ON 31 October 2011, Mister You has released his third album "Dans ma grotte". The first single from the album was "Mets-toi à l'aise" featuring Colonel Reyel followed by "J'regarde en l'air".

In July 2022, he was arrested at a French airport while on his way to Morocco; he was incarcerated at La Santé prison and released in early October.

== Discography ==
=== Albums ===
Year	Single	Charts			Certification	Notes
Year	Single	FR	BEL (Wa)	SWI	Certification	Notes
2011	Dans ma grotte	3	69	–		
2014	Le Prince	8	35	–		
2016	Le grand méchant You	27	57	–		
2019	Hasta la muerte (HLM: Hasta la muerte)	17	47	–		
2021	HLM2 (HLM2: Hasta la muerte 2)	6	42	91		
2023	HLM3 (HLM3: Hasta la muerte 3)	–	175	–		

=== EPs ===
- 2009: Prise d'Otage

=== Mixtapes, others ===
Year	Single	Charts		Notes
Year	Single	FR	BEL (Wa)	Notes
2004	Mi ange, mi demons	–	–	
2007	Cocktail de rue	–	–	
2008	La rue c'est paro	–	–	
2009	Arrete You si tu peux	–	–	
2010	Présumé coupable	50	–	
2010	MDR Mec de rue	9	–	
2012	MDR Mec de rue 2	10	38	

=== Singles ===
Year	Single	Peak positions		Album
Year	Single	FR	BEL (Wa)	Album
2011	"Ça sort du Zoogataga" (feat. Tunisiano & Isleym)	66	–	
2011	"Funk You (with DJ Abdel feat. Francisco)	12	2* (Ultratip)	Dans ma grotte
2011	"Mets-toi à l'aise" (feat. Colonel Reyel)	37	18* (Ultratip)	Dans ma grotte
2011	"J'regarde en l'air"	25	37* (Ultratip)	Dans ma grotte
2012	"Roule avec moi" (feat. Djany)	148	–	Dans ma grotte
2012	"Crève en enfer"	139	–	
2013	"J'voulais"	48	–	Le Prince
2013	"3.5.7"	118	–	Le Prince
2014	"A toi..."	82	–	Le Prince
2014	"Paré pour décoller"	73	–	Le Prince
2014	"Emmène-moi" (feat. Nej)	26	–	Le Prince
2014	"Marseille - Paris" (with Jul)	86	–	
2019	"Flashback"	198	–	HLM: Hasta la muerte
2019	"Carnal" (feat. Lacrim)	169	–	HLM: Hasta la muerte
2020	"Pénurie"	89	–	
2020	"Ça se fait pas" (feat. Jul)	53	–	
2021	"La costa"	27	–	HLM2: Hasta la muerte 2
2021	"Solide" (feat. Rohff)	98	–	HLM2: Hasta la muerte 2
2021	"Couplets gagnants" (feat. L'Allemand)	179	–	HLM2: Hasta la muerte 2

*Did not appear in the official Belgian Ultratop 50 charts, but rather in the bubbling under Ultratip charts.

Non charting

- 2010: "Lettre à un traitre"
- 2010: "Quand on était petit" (feat. Nessbeal)
- 2010: "Les p'tits de chez moi"
- 2011: "Mal bien acquis profite toujours"
- 2011: "La mouche"
- 2012: "Pas d'love" feat. Sana

=== Featured in ===
Year	Single	Peak positions		Certification	Album
Year	Single	FR	BEL Wa	Certification	Album
2013	"Funk You 2" (DJ Abdel feat. Mister You, Francisco & Big Ali)	118	24* (Ultratip)		DJ Abdel album Evolution
2013	"On va tout perdre" (Lacrim feat. Mister You)	116	–		
2015	"Jugni ji" (DJ Kayz feat. Mister You, Dr Zeus & Sophia Akkara)	43	–		Planète Rap 2015 Vol. 2
2019	"On passe le temps" (Naps feat. Mister You)	129	–		
2020	"Culiacan" (Da Uzi feat. Mister You)	67	–		Da Uzi album Architecte
2020	"Ben Ali" (Brulux feat. Mister You)	147	–		Brulux album La sans pitax

*Did not appear in the official Belgian Ultratop 50 charts, but rather in the bubbling under Ultratip charts.
