= Lartiste =

French-Moroccan singer and rapper (born 1985)

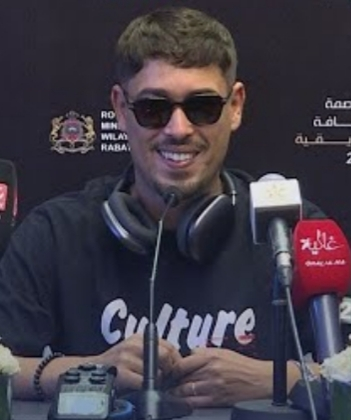

Background information
- Born: Youssef Akdim; 4 July 1985 (age 41); Imintanoute, Morocco
- Genres: French hip hop, Afropop
- Occupations: Singer, songwriter, rapper
- Years active: 2006–present
- Label: Purple Money

Youssef Akdim (Berber: ⵢⵓⵙⴻⴼ ⴰⵇⴷⵉⵎ; Arabic: يوسف أقديم; born 4 July 1985), better known as Lartiste (French: [laʁtist]), is a French-Moroccan singer and rapper. He is one of the most successful French Moroccans with several hit songs like Mafiosa, Chocolat, Missile, and Bang Bang.

He released "Évasion", his first maxi solo, in 2006 and joined the collective French Cut, having released a mixtape, Rap 1.9, in 2010. Going solo, his 2013 studio album, Lalbum ( l'album – "the album" in English), included several musical influences including funk, soul, pop, electro and African sounds. He released his second studio album, Fenomeno, in 2015, his third and fourth albums, Maestro and Clandestino, in 2016, and his fifth Clandestino, in 2018.

Also in 2018, the third single from Clandestino, Mafiosa, which features Brazilian singer Caroliina, reached number 2 in the main French singles chart, number one in the Megafusion chart (which contabilizes the selling and streaming numbers in France), number six in Wallonia and number one in Portugal, where it was the first radio hit containing a significant part of its lyrics in French since Stromae's "Papaoutai", in 2014.

== Early life ==
Youssef Akdim was born on 4 July 1985, in Imintanoute, near Marrakech, Morocco. He emigrated to France at seven years old, where he lived in Bondy and Le Blanc-Mesnil, outside of Paris.

At 15, he joined his first rap group, Malédiction. Three years later, he adopted the stage name Lartiste (lit. the Artist), and taught himself music production. In 2006, he released his debut EP, Évasion, which was well-received. Alongside music, he worked as a specialized educator in Montfermeil. By 2010, he dropped his first mixtape, Rap 1.9, under the label French Cut.

He later signed with Hostile Records (a division of EMI) and recorded his debut album, Lalbum (2013). However, after EMI’s sale transferred Hostile to Warner Music, the album received minimal promotion and underperformed. Lartiste subsequently returned to independence.

== Career ==
=== Rise to Fame: Fenomeno & Maestro (2015–2016) ===
In 2015, he self-produced his second album, Fenomeno, led by hits like Polygame and Trop de Flow. It went Gold and featured collaborations with artists like DJ Hamida (Déconnectés), La Fouine (Insta), and Sinik (Au bout de ma life).

His third album, Maestro (March 2016), was a commercial triumph, earning Platinum status within six months (100,000+ sales). The title track Maestro became an anthem.

=== Clandestino & Global Success (2016–2017) ===
On 9 December 2016, he released Clandestino, featuring the viral hit Chocolat (with Awa Imani). On On n'est pas couché (a popular French talk show), Lartiste revealed the track was both a celebration of Black women and a denunciation of racism. Chocolat was certified Diamond, and the album went Platinum.

In 2017, his collab C’est une frappe (with DJ Hamida) hit Gold.

=== Later Projects: Grandestino to Comme avant (2018–2020) ===
- Grandestino (February 2018): Featured bangers like Catchu, Vai & Viens, and Mafiosa (later certified Diamond). The album went Platinum in under five months.
- Quartier Latin Vol. 1 (February 2019): Collaborations with Sofiane, Koba LaD, and Heuss l’Enfoiré. Lead single Social debuted with a music video on Christmas Day 2018. The album sold 5,593 copies in its first week.
- Comme avant (July 2020): His seventh album included features with Lyna Mahyem, Caroliina (reuniting after Mafiosa), and artists from his label Nudeal Records (Mizi, Sheyrine, Bramo l’Epicier).

== Discography ==
- Lalbum (2013)
- Fenomeno (2015)
- Maestro (2016)
- Clandestino (2016)
- Grandestino (2018)
- Quartier Latin Vol.1 (2019)

== See also ==
- Moroccans in France
- Zamdane - Moroccan-born French rapper
- La Fouine - prominent Moroccan-French rapper
- Mister You - another prominent Moroccan-French rapper
