= Kayna Samet =

French hip-hop and R&B singer (born 1980)

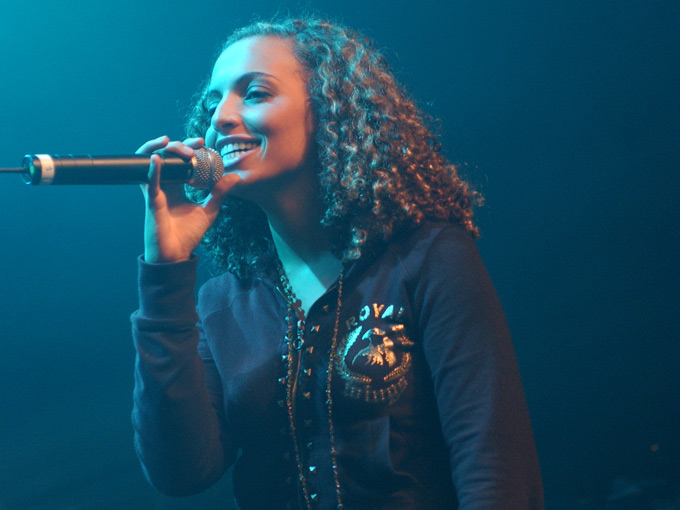

Background information
- Born: Malika Zoubir; 1980 (age 45–46); Nice, Provence-Alpes-Côte d'Azur, France
- Genres: Hip hop; soul; R&B
- Occupation: Singer
- Years active: 1999–present
- Labels: Virgin, Barclay

Kayna Samet (born 27 September 1980 in Nice) is a French hip hop and R&B singer.

== Biography ==
=== Childhood ===
During her childhood her parents divorced. Kayna first discovered her love of music listening to her grandfather's funk records, and she also enjoyed traditional French singers such as Jacques Brel, Édith Piaf, and Léo Ferré.

Malika really found her passion for music at the age of 10 when she joined her school choir.

At age 15, she decided to immerse herself in the musical world, joining local rap groups, at first as a singer, then as a rapper.

=== Debut ===
With her first manager Nabila Jaadi, Kayna modelled, financed by doing odd jobs and performing as an opening act.

In 1999, Kayna came out with her first demo, "Le Parcours d'une Goutte d'Eau." Her manager and she were always had high hopes, and she sent the tape to several major labels. It was then that doors began to open for her. In 2000, she performed the track "Jeune Fille d'en Bas" on the soundtrack of the movie La Squale. The song was produced by Cut Killer and DJ Abdel, and they reworked the song for an international R ‘n’ B compilation titled Vas-y Pars.

It was then that then Malika chose the name Kayna Samet, paying tribute to Kahina, the legendary Berber commander, and her maternal grandmother. She soon meets singer Matt Houston who offers her a part on the duet "Le Prix à payer", off of his second album. He further offers for Kayna to go on tour with him, which presented her first opportunity to meet Diam's.

In July 2002, Kayna Samet came out solo with the song Blazée D'la Life. Booba, after having heard said song, asked her to sing the hook on the track "Destinée", off of his album Temps Mort.

In 2003, she collaborated with IAM on their track "Nous," from their album Revoir un Printemps. She also got the chance to work with Rohff on the song "Pétrole" from his album La Fierté des Nôtres. In time, Kayna signed with the label Voix Publik and started working on writing her first album, working with various artists in the process.

== Discography ==
=== Albums ===
- 1999: Le parcours d'une goutte d'eau
- 2005: Entre deux je
- 2012: Second souffle
- 2014: Thug Wife
- 2022: Altair vol.1
- 2023: Altair vol. 2
