= La Fierté des Nôtres =

La fierté des nôtres

Studio album by Rohff
- Released: June 17, 2004
- Studio: Studio Davout (Paris, France); Studios Coppelia (Paris, France); Studio EMI, Courbevoie
- Genre: French hip hop
- Length: 2:25:44
- Label: Delabel
- Producer: Admiral John; Big Nas; DJ Khalil; Doltz; Don Silver; Fred Le Magicien; Jarode; J. R. Rotem; Mr. Porter; Reego; Sayd Des Mureaux; Wadson

Rohff chronology
La vie avant la mort (2001)	La fierté des nôtres (2004)	Au-delà de mes limites (2005)

Singles from La fierté des nôtres
- 1. "94" Released: 2004; 2. "Le son qui tue" Released: 2004; 3. "Zone internationale" Released: 2005; 4. "Charisme" Released: 2005; 5. "Ça fait plaisir" Released: 2005

La fierté des nôtres is the third studio album by French rapper Rohff. It was released on 17 June 2004 via Delabel/EMI Music France. Recording sessions took place at Studio Davout and Studios Coppelia in Paris and at Studio EMI, Courbevoie. Production was handled by Admiral John, Big Nas, DJ Khalil, Doltz, Don Silver, Fred Le Magicien, Jarode, J. R. Rotem, Mr. Porter, Reego, Sayd Des Mureaux and Wadson. It features guest appearances from Admiral T, Alibi Montana, Bleet, DJ Spank, Expression Direkt, Hasheem, Intouchable, Janice, J. Mi Sissoko, Judy, Kamelancien, Kayna Samet, Kery James, Koffi Olomide, Laure Milan, Milka, Mohamed Lamine, Nathy, Roldán G. Rivero, Sefyu and Wallen. The album peaked at number 5 in France, number 27 in Wallonia and number 37 in Switzerland. On 24 August 2004, the album was certified Gold by the Syndicat national de l'édition phonographique. It spawned five charted singles: "94", "Le son qui tue" and "Zone internationale", with accompanying music videos, following-up by "Charisme" and "Ça fait plaisir".

== Track listing ==
Disc 1
No.	Title	Writer(s)	Producer(s)	Length
1.	"La fierté des nôtres" (Intro)	Housni M'Kouboi; Jonathan Reuven Rotem	J. R. Rotem	3:29
2.	"Nouveau rap" (featuring DJ Spank)	M'Kouboi; Admiral John	Admiral John	3:50
3.	"Le milieu"	M'Kouboi; Saïd Nabil	Sayd Des Mureaux	4:09
4.	"La vie continue" (featuring Judy, Laure Milan and Milka)	M'Kouboi; Judi Caêl Sene; Doltz; Reego	Doltz; Reego	5:06
5.	"Ça fait plaisir" (featuring Intouchable)	M'Kouboi; Hakim Sid; Delica Landry; Rotem	J. R. Rotem	4:19
6.	"Dur d'être peace" (featuring Janice and Koffi Olomide)	M'Kouboi; Janice; Khalil Abdul-Rahman	DJ Khalil	3:51
7.	"Pleures pas"	M'Kouboi; Nabil	Sayd Des Mureaux	5:15
8.	"Pétrole" (featuring Kayna Samet)	M'Kouboi; Malika Zoubir; Rotem	J. R. Rotem	4:28
9.	"Trop d'énergie" (featuring Mohamed Lamine)	M'Kouboi; Mohamed Lamine; Big Nas	Big Nas	4:08
10.	"Message à la racaille"	M'Kouboi; Nabil	Sayd Des Mureaux	7:23
11.	"Le cœur d'un homme"	M'Kouboi; Nabil	Sayd Des Mureaux	4:09
12.	"Souvenirs" (featuring Janice)	M'Kouboi; Nabil	Sayd Des Mureaux	6:10
13.	"Charisme" (featuring Wallen)	M'Kouboi; Nawell Azzouz; Rotem	J. R. Rotem	4:13
14.	"Le son qui tue" (featuring Nathy)	M'Kouboi; Don Silver	Don Silver	3:43
15.	"Le son de la Hagra" (featuring Expression Direkt)	M'Kouboi; Jean-Luc Elizabeth; Njoh Njoh Mouelle; Mickaël Haustant; Wadson	Wadson	5:48
16.	"Mal aimé" (featuring Kery James and Hasheem)	M'Kouboi; Alix Mathurin; Jarode	Jarode	4:35

Disc 2
No.	Title	Writer(s)	Producer(s)	Length
17.	"Fils à Pap"	M'Kouboi; Nabil	Sayd Des Mureaux	4:24
18.	"T'es pas comme moi" (featuring Bleet)	M'Kouboi; Don Silver	Don Silver	4:01
19.	"Bling bling" (featuring Admiral T)	M'Kouboi; Christy Campbell; Rotem	J. R. Rotem	3:55
20.	"Apparences trompeuses" (featuring Wallen)	M'Kouboi; Rotem	J. R. Rotem	4:09
21.	"Sincère" (featuring Janice)	M'Kouboi; Don Silver	Don Silver	4:25
22.	"Toujours ton enfant"	M'Kouboi; Nabil	Sayd Des Mureaux	4:54
23.	"Fiston" (featuring J. Mi Sissoko)	M'Kouboi; Jean-Michel Sissoko; Nabil	Sayd Des Mureaux	4:35
24.	"Pervertie"	M'Kouboi; Nabil	Sayd Des Mureaux	5:07
25.	"Bollywood Style"	M'Kouboi; Don Silver	Don Silver	4:11
26.	"Zone internationale" (featuring Roldan G. Rivero of Orishas)	M'Kouboi; Roldán Gonzalez Rivero; Big Nas	Big Nas	5:14
27.	"94"	M'Kouboi; Denaun Porter	Mr. Porter	5:56
28.	"Le mot d'ordre"	M'Kouboi; Nabil	Sayd Des Mureaux	5:34
29.	"Code 187" (featuring Kamelancien, Alibi Montana and Sefyu)	M'Kouboi; Kamel Houari; Nikarson Saint-Germain; Youssef Soukoura; Don Silver	Don Silver	6:12
30.	"J'rappe mieux que toi" (Outro)	M'Kouboi; Frédéric Dudouet	Fred Le Magicien	8:31
Total length:				2:25:44

Sample credits

- Track 12 contains a sample of the song "Femmes Fatales" written by Alfonso Cervantes and Ronny Altbach.

== Personnel ==
- Housni "Rohff" M'Kouboi – vocals, mixing (tracks: 2, 6, 7, 9, 11, 16, 18, 22–24, 26, 29)
- Marc "DJ Spank" Gremillon – additional vocals (track 2)
- Judy Caël Sene – chorus vocals (track 4)
- Laure Céline Gelas – chorus vocals (track 4)
- Milka – chorus vocals (track 4)
- Hakim "Demon One" Sid – vocals (track 5)
- Landry "Dry" Delica – vocals (track 5)
- Janice – vocals (track 6), chorus vocals (tracks: 12, 21)
- Antoine Christophe Agbepa Mumba – vocals (track 6)
- Malika "Kayna Samet" Zoubir – vocals (track 8)
- Mohamed Lamine – vocals (track 9)
- Nawell "Wallen" Azzouz – vocals (track 13), chorus vocals (track 20)
- Nathanaël "Nathy" Beausivoir – vocals (track 14)
- Jean-Luc "Delta" Elizabeth – vocals (track 15)
- Njoh Njoh "Le T.I.N." Mouelle – vocals (track 15)
- Mickaël "Weedy" Haustant – vocals (track 15)
- Alix "Kery James" Mathurin – vocals (track 16)
- Said-Hachime "Hasheem" Ahamada – chorus vocals (track 16)
- Bleet – chorus vocals (track 18)
- Christy "Admiral T" Campbell – vocals (track 19)
- Jean-Michel Sissoko – vocals (track 23)
- Roldán Gonzalez Rivero – vocals (track 26)
- Eddy "Eklips" Blondeau – human beatbox (track 27)
- Kamel "Kamelancien" Houari – vocals (track 29)
- Nikarson "Alibi Montana" Saint-Germain – vocals (track 29)
- Youssef "Sefyu" Soukoura – vocals (track 29)
- Martin Rodriguez – violin (track 12)
- François Grière – bass (track 17)
- Saïd "Sayd Des Mureaux" Nabil – arranger (track 6), producer (tracks: 3, 7, 10–12, 17, 22–24, 28), mixing (tracks: 6, 7, 11, 22–24)
- Djamel "DJ Kore" Fezari – arranger (track 15)
- Pascal Boniani "Skalpovich" Koeu – arranger (track 15)
- Jonathan "J.R." Rotem – producer (tracks: 1, 5, 8, 13, 19, 20)
- Admiral John – producer & mixing (track 2)
- Doltz – producer (track 4)
- Reego – producer (track 4)
- "DJ Khalil" Abdul-Rahman – producer (track 6)
- Big Nas – producer & mixing (tracks: 9, 26)
- Don Silver – producer (tracks: 14, 18, 21, 25, 29), mixing (tracks: 14, 29)
- Wadson – producer (track 15)
- Jarode – producer (track 16)
- Denaun "Kon Artis" Porter – producer (track 27)
- Frédéric "Fred Le Magicien" Dudouet – producer (track 30)
- Benjamin Caillaud – recording
- Romain Della Valle – recording
- Anthony Aribo – recording assistant
- Hugues De Cottignies – recording assistant
- Thomas Charlet – recording assistant
- Richard "Segal" Huredia – mixing (tracks: 1, 3–5, 8, 10, 12–15)
- Steve Baughman – mixing (track 27)
- Bernie Grundman – mastering
- Tom Coyne – mastering (track 7)
- Jonathan Mannion – photography
- Grim Team – artwork

== Charts ==
=== Weekly charts ===
Chart (2004)	Peak position
Belgian Albums (Ultratop Wallonia)	27
French Albums (SNEP)	5
Swiss Albums (Schweizer Hitparade)	37

=== Year-end charts ===
Chart (2004)	Position
French Albums (SNEP)	60
Chart (2005)	Position
French Albums (SNEP)	194

== Certifications ==
Region	Certification	Certified units/sales
France (SNEP)	Gold	100,000^{*}
^{*} Sales figures based on certification alone.
