= Street Lourd =

French record label

Street Lourd is a French record label specializing in French urban music. It was established in 2004 by DJ Mosko, Teddy Corona and Mista Flo all from the Mafia K-1 Fry collective.

The label has also released a series of Street Lourd concept albums produced and performed by members of the Mafia K-1 Fry collective

== Albums ==
=== Street Lourd Hall Stars (2004) ===
Street Lourd Hall Stars

Studio album by Various Artists
- Released: 16 November 2004
- Recorded: 2004
- Genre: Hip hop, Rap
- Label: Street Lourd / Troisième Bureau

Various Artists chronology
Street Lourd Hall Stars (2004)	Street Lourd Hall Stars II (2010)

The initial album was produced by DJ Mosko, Teddy Corona and Mista Flo (all from the collective) and contained 20 tracks by various artists. It was released on 16 November 2004.

==== Track list ====
1. Rohff & Kamelancien: "À quoi bon sert" (3:55)
2. Rim'K & Lino: "Haute criminologie" (3:25)
3. Kool Shen & Serum: "Du 93 au 94" (3:33)
4. Pit Baccardi, Cohorte & Dosseh: "Le son de la street" (3:42)
5. Intouchable, Kamelancien & Rohff: La Hass (4:24)
6. Kery James & Booba: "Chacun sa manière" (3:38)
7. Alibi Montana: "Ta gueule" (3:14)
8. AP & Mista Flo: "94 Hall Stars" (3:14)
9. Diam's & Kennedy: "Parce que le monde" (4:11)
10. Rohff: "En mode 1" (3:26)
11. Soprano, L'Algérino & Kalash: "Reseaux pas hallal" (4:07)
12. Aketo, OGB & Saïko: "Pour les Halls" (4:05)
13. Skomoni: "Le jeu du rap" (2:58)
14. Dontcha & Calbo: "Street Lourd" (3:04)
15. Karlito & Rak: "Tout le monde en parle" (3:03)
16. Dragon D & Incorruptible: "Tu peux pas" (3:29)
17. Sefyu Molotov & RR: "Vnr" (3:57)
18. Sinik & Dynam: "Lyrics rue" (3:21)
19. Dicidens: "Le sang des tours (3:29)
20. Rohff: "En mode 2" (3:40)

=== Street Lourd II (2010) ===
Street Lourd II

Studio album by Various Artists
- Released: 12 July 2010
- Recorded: 2010
- Genre: Hip hop, Rap
- Label: Street Lourd

Various Artists chronology
Street Lourd Hall Stars (2004)	Street Lourd II (2010)

Mafia K-1 Fry collective had a second collective release consisting of a double CD, released on 12 July 2010. Known as Street Lourd II (full title Mafia K-1 Fry Presents Street Lord II) The first CD contained 19 tracks by various artists of the collective, and the second CD 2 tracks and a series of 13 freestyle works.

==== Track list ====
CD 1

1. Kery James - Ghetto Youss - Skomoni: "Boys in the Hood" (3:48)
2. Rim'K - Kool Shen: "Reste pas là" (3:04)
3. Youssoupha - Mam's - Arsenik: "Ne compare pas" (3:33)
4. Nessbeal - Dry: "La Succursale" (3:29)
5. Seth Gueko - Alpha 5.20 - Mista Flo: "Pour les Youves" (4:06)
6. Rohff: "Salamoualikoum" (5:11)
7. Salif - Shone - Six Coups MC: "Y'a koi?" (4:17)
8. Soprano - Brasco - Aketo: "G.H.E.T.T.O" (4:26)
9. L.I.M. - Demon One - Boulox Force - Selim du 9.4: "La Danse des Leurs-dea" (4:15)
10. Le Rat Luciano - Larsen - Mister You: "C'est du Lourd (Remix)" (4:31)
11. Tunisiano - OGB - Médine: "Le Traite de ma Street" (4:15)
12. Al K-Pote - R.R - M.E.H: "Ca arrache" (3:34)
13. Kery James - Sefyu: "Street Lourd Terrible" (3:34)
14. Zesau - Despo Rutti - "Sauvage" (4:07)
15. AP du 113 - Nubi: "Pirates des Caraïbes" (3:57)
16. La Fouine - Alonzo - Teddy Corona: "Dans nos Quartiers" (4:34)
17. TLF - Karlito: "Ma ville, Ma capitale" (4:16)
18. Sinik - Kamelancien: "Enfants Terribles" (3:52)
19. Niro: "T'as l'seum" (4:05)

CD 2

- 1. "Freestyle Hall Stars" (4:54) by
1. Niro
2. Sadek
3. Sofiane
4. B.O Digital
5. Tiers Monde
6. Kaaris
7. Croma
8. Béné
9. Beli Blanco
10. Stokos
11. Dixon
12. Marechal
13. Don Kan
- 2. Amy et Bushy: "Ho Merde! (V.2)" (4:53)
- 3. Le Rat Luciano - Larsen - Mister You: "C'est du Lourd" (4:36)
