= Chris Macari =

French music video director and producer

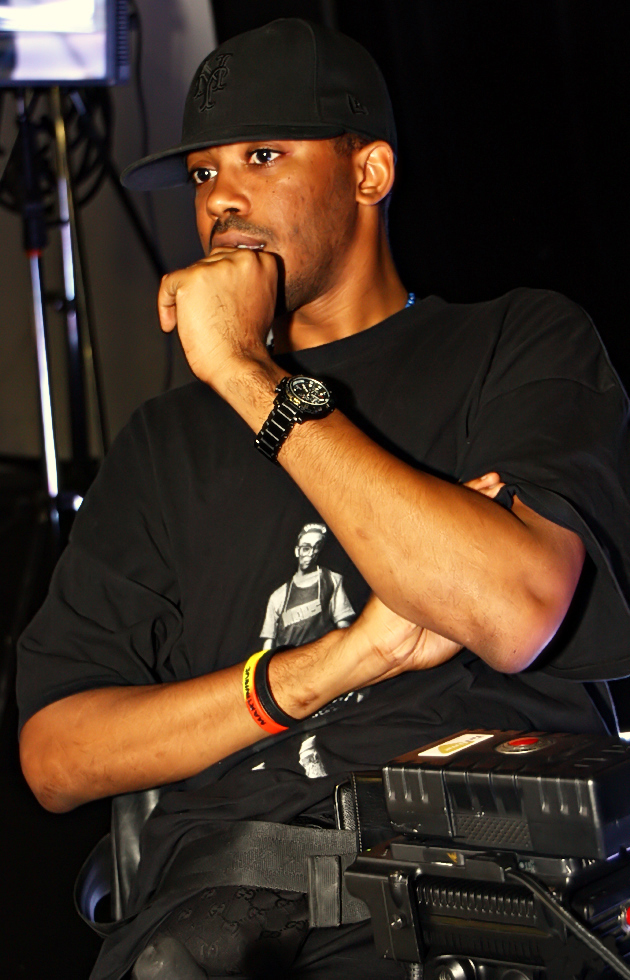
- Chris Macari directing a video of Booba, 2009
- Born: Christian Gabriel Ledru Macari; 8 February 1980 (age 46); Créteil, France
- Occupations: Music video director and producer; screenwriter
- Years active: 2004–present
- Website: chrismacari.com

Christian Gabriel Ledru Macari (born 8 February 1980) is a French music video director and producer from the French West Indies. Through his company, Tchimbé Raid Production, he has released more than 50 videos of Hip Hop, RnB, Reggae-Dancehall and Zouk since 2006. He was honoured in 2008 at the Paris Olympia for his production of Le Combat Continue 3 by Kery James. He is active on the French Hip Hop scene.

He undertook a career in direction and production, and has worked with artists such as Snoop Dogg, Bushido, Fler, Booba, Damani, Kery James, La Fouine, Mac Tyer, Mokobé, Soprano, Rim'K, Sefyu, Rohff, Nessbeal, Casey, Despo, Soprano, 113, Princess Lover!, Tina, Ali Angel and Tony Parker.

== Style ==
Influenced during his youth by Spike Lee, Hype Williams, Chris Robinson, Ridley Scott, Tony Scott, Martin Scorsese, John Singleton and actors such as Denzel Washington and Samuel L. Jackson, Macari has a style described as dark, with original cinematographic touches.

== Awards ==
Macari won the award of Best Hip Hop Video in 2008 at the Olympia for the second sequel of "Les Trophées de l’Année du Hip Hop” for "Le Combat Continue 3" by Kery James He was the winner of the RFO contest "Best Short Movie Amateur" in 2003 for his movie Tchimbe Raid.

== Personal life ==
Macari was born in the Val de Marne in France, and left with his parents for Martinique two weeks after his birth. He grew up on Martinique, first in Carbet, and then in Shcoelcher. He was educated in the capital city, Fort-de-France. He went to Ernest Renan Secondary School and to Victor Schoelcher High School. He graduated with an A-level in economics in 1998, and went to Paris for graphic art studies at the Grande Ecole of ESAG Penninghen, obtaining a diploma with honours in 2003.

== Videography ==
- April 2014: "Level" - Fler
- April 2014: "Une vie" - Booba
- November 2013: "Parlons Peu" - Booba
- October 2013: "63" - Kaaris
- September 2013 : "RTC" - Booba
- August 2013: "High Heels" - Fler featuring Jihad and Animus
- June 2013 : "Turfu" - Booba
- May 2013 : "Chrome" - Fler
- October 2012 : "Hinter blauen Augen" - Fler
- September 2012 : "Caramel" - Booba
- September 2012 : "Nummer Eins" - Fler
- August 2012 : "Vlog Geneve La Reunion" - Booba
- July 2012 : "Zoe Bras/Zoe In Me" - Gato Da Bato
- July 2012 : "Vlog La Guadeloupe Montreal" - Booba
- June 2012 : "Scarface Remix" - Tyla
- May 2012 : "A4" - Booba
- May 2012 : "Ni++er" - Mac Tyer featuring Despo'Rutti
- April 2012 : "Vlog Congo Part.2" - Booba
- April 2012 : "Casque Integral" - Dosseh & Kozi
- April 2012 : "Vlog Congo Part.1" - Booba
- March 2012 :" Classico" - Rim'K
- February 2012 : "Portrait Robot" - Rim K
- February 2012 : "Dans Ton Kwaah" - Niro
- Décember 2011 : "Corner" de Gato Da Bato Featuring Booba
- Décember 2011 : "Hors Catégorie" - Niro
- Décember 2011 : "Vaisseau Mère" - Booba
- November 2011 : "Gingerwine" - Nessbeal
- November 2011 : "La nébuleuse des aigles" - Nessbeal featuring Isleym
- November 2011 : "Africa Shootez Ballon(Official Song of the CAN Orange 2012)" - Jon Loo K
- November 2011 : "Paname" - Booba
- October 2011 : "Ce N'Etait Pas Le Deal" - Mac Tyer
- October 2011 : "Cruella" - Shay featuring Booba
- October 2011 : "Gunshot" - Nessbeal
- October 2011 : "Bakel City Gang" - Booba
- August 2011 : "L'histoire d'un mec qui coule" - Nessbeal
- June 2011: "Comme Une Etoile" - Booba
- April 2011: "Régime Militaire" - Abou2ner
- April 2011: " Killer" – Booba
- April 2011: "Le Legiste" – Kaaris
- April 2011: "Leader" – OGB ft IAM & Mafia K'1 Fry
- March 2011: "Saddam Hauts de Seine" – Booba
- January 2011: "Abracadabra" – Booba
- December 2010: "On pense a vous" – 113 ft Amel Bent
- November 2010: "Ma Couleur" – Booba
- October 2010: "Jour De Paye" – Booba
- October 2010: "Chez Nous" – Les Associés
- October 2010: "Weg eines Kriegers" – Berlins Most Wanted
- September 2010: "Berlins Most Wanted" – Berlins Most Wanted
- September 2010: "Caesar Palace" – Booba
- August 2010: "Mali Debout" – Mokobe
- July 2010: "Dinguerie" – 113
- June 2010: "Golo" – La Comera
- June 2010: "Ca Chante" – SMOD
- June 2010: "Lamborghini" – Green
- May 2010: "Nu Lajan" – Gato Da Bato Feat Booba
- May 2010: "Dangeroots" – Despo Rutti
- April 2010: "Tony A Tué Manny" – Mac Tyer
- April 2010: "Redemption" – Despo Rutti
- April 2010: "Viser La Victoire" – Admiral T feat Medine & La Fouine
- Mars 2010: "Chacun Son Vice" – Alonzo (feat. Ekila)
- March 2010: "Ca Bouge Pas" – Nessbeal
- March 2010: "Here Comes Damani" – Damani Feat. Snoop Dogg
- March 2010: "So" (directed in December 2006) – Mac Tyer
- March 2010: "Créature Ratée" – Casey
- February 2010: "Foetus" – Booba
- February 2010: "Braquage Vocal" – Alonzo
- December 2009: "Banlieue Sale" – La Fouine (Feat.Nessbeal)
- December 2009: "Je suis le quartier" – Alonzo
- November 2009: "Krav Maga" – La Fouine
- October 2009: "Rats Des Villes" – Booba
- June 2009: "Double Poney" – Booba
- June 2009: "Bande A Part" – Mala
- May 2009: "Sévère" – Rohff
- May 2009: "We We We" – Seth Gueko
- April 2009: "Le Son Des Capuches" – Seth Gueko
- March 2009: "Amnezia" – Nessbeal
- March 2009: "Truc De Ouf" – Kennedy
- February 2009: "Game Over" – Booba
- February 2009: "Mauvais Œil Dans Le Périmètre" – Mac Tyer
- January 2009: "Aigle Royal" – Dosseh
- January 2009: "Discret" – AP
- December 2008: "Rap Game" – Rohff
- November 2008: "Progress" – Rohff ft Junior Reid
- October 2008: "Ghetto Boyz/Vroum Vroum" – Mac Tyer
- July 2008: "Terrain Vague" Rim K
- June 2008: "Le Loup Dans La Bergerie" – Nessbeal
- June 2008: "On Aime ca" – Nessbeal
- April 2008: "RSC (rois sans couronne)" – Nessbeal
- March 2008: "Hustler" – Krys (ft. Vybz Kartel + Aidonia)
- February 2008: "Dernière Chance" – Lea Castel (ft. Soprano)
- February 2008: "Laisse Moi Dans Mon Bunker" – Fat Taf (ft. Despo'Rutti)
- January 2008: "Parloir Fantôme" – Rim K ft. Sefyu
- December 2007: "Clandestino" – Rim K
- November 2007: "Le Combat Continue part III" – Kery James
- October 2007: "Safari" – Mokobe
- September 2007: "L'Espoir des Favelas" – Rim K
- July 2007: "Elle M'Envie" – Princess Lover
- July 2007: "Mon Soleil (New Version)" – Princess Lover
- May 2007: "Paroles de Soninke" – Mokobe, 113
- March 2007: "Balance Toi" – Tony Parker
- January 2007: "Chez Moi" – Casey
- November 2006: "Bolides" – Despo Rutti
- October 2006: "Vini" – Tina
- September 2006: "Please Love Me" – Marco Polo
- June 2006: "9.3. Tu Peux Pas Test" – Mac Tyer
- June 2006: "Emeutiers" – Insurrection
- May 2006: "Cliches" – Mac Kregor
- April 2006: "Ali & Marisa" – Lovely
- April 2006: "Trafic de Stereotypes" – Despo Rutti
- April 2006: "Stop" – Hiroshimaa
- January 2006: "7eme Ciel" – Jamice
- January 2006: "Fermes Tes Yeux" – 2 Wayz
- December 2005: "Juste Nous" – Ali Angel
- October 2005: "Snake Me" – Warren
- October 2005: "Je te Donne" – Warren
- September 2005: "Vitry Nocturne" – 113
- June 2005: – "Ailleurs" West Isle
- March/April 2005: "On Ira Bien" – LS
- February/March 2005: "Rap & Biz" – Weedy
- January/February 2005: "Invincible" – O.G Plasm
- January 2005: "Madd Thing" – Madd Youths Records
- September 2004: "Pa meny.. Mwen" – Tendance 09 vol.1
- September 2005/April 2006: "Morgane de Clara" – Clara Morgane
- December 2004: school film for Supinfo – Institute of Information Technology
- August 2004: "Je Doute" – Tendance 09 vol.1
- August 2004: "Dommage" – Tendance 09 vol.1
- 2003: "The Letter" – Tchimbe Raid Production
