= AP (rapper) =

French rapper (born 1978)

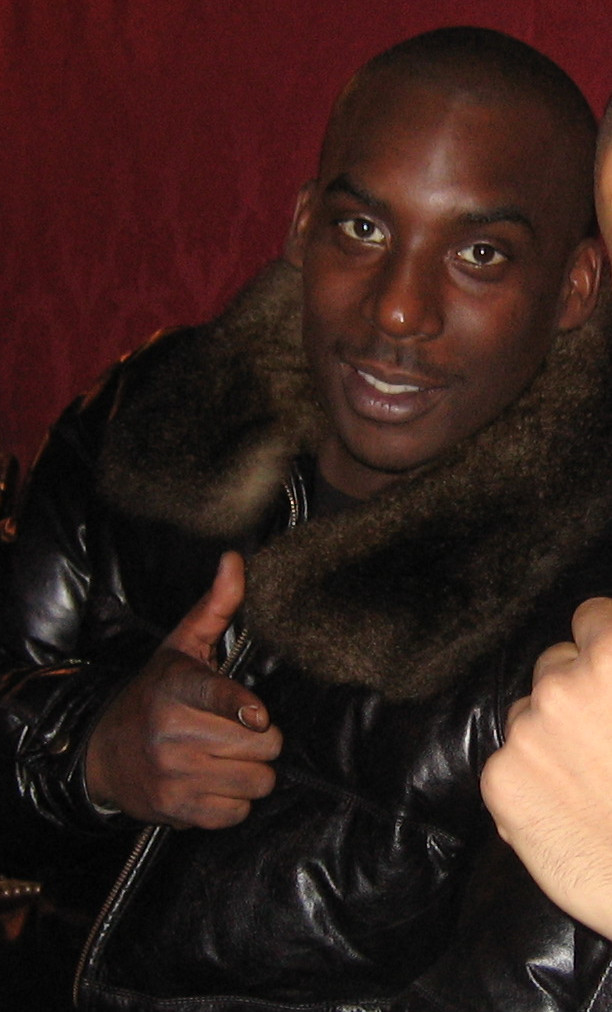

Background information
- Born: Yohann Duport; 9 April 1978 (age 48); Créteil, Île-de-France
- Genre: Hip hop
- Occupation: Rapper
- Years active: 1994–present

Yohann Duport (French pronunciation: [joan dypɔʁ]), better known by his stage name AP (born 9 April 1978 in Créteil, Île-de-France), is a French rapper whose parents originated from Guadeloupe, French Antilles.

== Career ==
In 1994, AP started rapping at the age of 15 in the Paris suburbs, mainly Vitry-sur-Seine. He became a founding member of the rap trio 113 alongside Rim'K and Mokobé and part of a bigger music project collective called Mafia K-1 Fry. He also has his own solo career including albums Discret released in 2009, where he is credited as AP du 113, with the album reaching number 22 on the SNEP French Albums Chart. He has co-directed and co-produced the compilation Zone Caraïbes in 2005.

== Discography ==
=== Albums ===
Solo albums

Year	Single	Charts	Certification	Notes
Year	Single	FR	Certification	Notes
2009	Discret	22	—	Tracklist: 1. "Intro" (2:03); 2. "Discret" (3:33); 3. "La nuit" (feat. Despo Rutti) (4:53); 4. "Roue de secours" (4:30); 5. "Tempéraments" (feat. Dry & OCB) (4:40); 6. "Tout peut basculer" (3:38); 7. "Je suis libre" (feat. JMI Sissoko) (4:42); 8. "Black Machine" (4:09); 9. "Skit" (feat. Dawa) (1:46); 10. "Gwada" (feat. Krys & Dawa) (3:56); 11. "De passage" (feat. Léa Castel) (4:09); 12. "Évasion" (2:57); 13. "Le zeille" (feat. Selim du 94) (4:27); 14. "All I Need You" (feat. Sizzla) (4:29); 15. "L'industrie" (feat. 113) (3:41); 16. "Dernier souffle" (9:31); 17. "Medhy Custos - Mes divas (Remix)" (3:57)

Compilations

- 2005: Zone Caraïbes (compilation co-produced by AP)

With 113

- 2000: Les Princes de la ville (certified platinum)
- 2002: 113 fout la merde (certified gold)
- 2003: Dans L'urgence (reedition) (certified gold)
- 2005: 113 Degrés (certified gold)
- 2010: Universel

With Mafia K-1 Fry

- 2003: La cerise sur le ghetto
- 2007: Jusqu'à la mort

=== Singles ===
Featured in

- 2009: "Relève la tête" (credited to Kery James presenting Lino, AP, Diam's, Passi, Matt & Kool Shen) (reached #39 in SNEP French Singles Chart)
