= Dry (rapper) =

French rapper

- Also known as: L'Amiral / L'Intransférable
- Born: Delica Landry; 16 March 1977 (age 49); Villepinte, France
- Genres: Hip hop
- Occupation: Rapper
- Years active: 1994 – present
- Label: Wati B

Delica Landry born 16 March 1977 in Villepinte, better known by his stage name Dry, is a French rapper of Congolese origin. He is also known by the aliases "L'Amiral" and "L'Intransférable".

== Life and Career ==
Landry Delica grew up in Sevran in Seine-Saint-Denis, outside of Paris, where he was friends with the rapper Nessbeal before moving in 1991 to Orly in the Val-de-Marne.

In addition to his solo work, Dry is a member of French rap group Intouchable alongside band member Demon One (real name Hakim Sid). He is also part of the French rap collective Mafia K-1 Fry (sometimes stylized as Mafia K'1 Fry) alongside the other Intouchable member Demon One. Intouchable, Dry and Demon One had a lot of collaborations with other members of the collective.

As member of Mafia K-1 Fry, Dry took part in albums by rappers Ideal J, Rohff and 113 before releasing with Intouchable the 2000 album Les points sur les I. In 2004, he took part in the third album Rohff La fierté des nôtres and in the compilation Street Lourd Hall Stars with "La hass" featuring Kamelancien, de Bicêtre -94-, and Rohff. In 2005, Intouchable released their second album La vie de rêve with a joint title "La gagne" featuring Tonton David. Dry has also been featured on a number of Sexion d'Assaut rap band.

In 2008, Dry had his debut solo album as a street tape entitled De la pure pour les durs including many of his unreleased tracks. In 2009, he released his debut studio album Les derniers seront les premiers followed up by a second solo studio album on 20 February 2012 called Tôt ou tard.

== Discography ==
=== Albums / Mixtapes ===
Solo

Year	Album	Charts		Notes	Certification
Year	Album	FR	BEL (Wa)	Notes	Certification
2008	De la pure pour les durs	54	–	Street tape	
2009	Les derniers seront les premiers	25	–	1st studio album	
2012	Tôt ou tard	18	170	2nd studio album	
2013	Maintenant ou jamais	13	72	3rd studio album	
2021	Dysnomia	–	–	4th studio album	

As part of Intouchable

- 2000 : Les points sur les I
- 2001 : I Have a Dream (maxi)
- 2004 : Original Mix-Tape (mixtape)
- 2005 : La vie de rêve

In collective Mafia K'1 Fry

- 1997 : Les liens sacrés
- 1999 : Légendaire
- 2003 : La cerise sur le ghetto
- 2007 : Jusqu'à la mort

=== Singles ===
Year	Single	Charts		Certification	Album
Year	Single	FR	BEL (Wa)	Certification	Album
2012	"Ma Mélodie" (featuring Maître Gims)	41	27		Tôt ou tard
2013	"Le choix" (featuring Maître Gims)	57	–		Maintenant ou jamais
2013	"Maintenant ou jamais" (with Tal)	79	58*		Maintenant ou jamais
2013	"On fait pas semblant" (featuring Dr Berize)	161	–		Maintenant ou jamais
2018	"Tant pis " (featuring Dadju)	89	–		

*Did not appear in the official Belgian Ultratop 50 charts, but rather in the bubbling under Ultratip charts. For Ultratip peaks, added 50 positions to arrive at an equivalent Ultratop position

Featured in

Year	Single	Charts			Album
Year	Single	FR	BEL (Vl)	BEL (Wa)	Album
2012	"Cérémonie" (Sexion d'Assaut featuring Dry)	82	–	53*	
2013	"One Shot" (Maître Gims featuring Dry)	16	57*	25	
2013	"Obrigado La Famille" (David Carreira featuring Dry)	55	–	–	
2014	"À la vôtre" (Black M feat. JR O Crom, Dry & Big Ali)	27	–	–	Les yeux plus gros que le monde
2014	"Billet facile" (Shin Sekaï, Dry, Abou Debeing & Docteur Beriz)	153	–	–	Les chroniques du Wati Boss - Volume 2
2018	"Mignon garçon" (4Keus feat. Naza, KeBlack & Dry)	107	–	–	

*Did not appear in the official Belgian Ultratop 50 charts, but rather in the bubbling under Ultratip charts. For Ultratip peaks, added 50 positions to arrive at an equivalent Ultratop position

=== Appearances ===
Main

- 2003: Dry - "Freestyle" on mixtape Pur son ghetto Vol. 2
- 2003: Dry feat Rohff, Sefyu & Zesau - Baiser sur la compile Talents fachés 1
- 2006: Dry feat Singuila - "Coup du sort" in the compilation Street couleur
- 2008: Dry feat Belly Blanco - "Je suis l'un d'eux" in the compilation Département 94
- 2009: Dry feat AP, Selim Du 9.4 & OGB - "J'ai la rime" in the compilation Les yeux dans la banlieue Vol. 2

Featured in

- 1996: Ideal J feat Dry, Rohff, Rim-K & Manu Key - "Show Bizness" in Ideal J EP Original Mc's sur une mission
- 2007: Rim'K feat Dry & Medine - "Le billet de banque" in Rim'K album Famille nombreuse
- 2008: Kery James feat Dry - "Egotripes" in the Kery James album A l'ombre du show business
- 2008: 3ème Prototype feat Dry - "Normal" on the Street CD of 3^{e} Prototype, Le renouveau
- 2008: Gooki feat Dry & S'Co - "J'ai fait un rêve" in the Gooki album Trop de choses à dire
- 2009: Kennedy feat Dry, Ol Kainry, Seth Gueko, Black Barby, Despo Rutti & Alonzo - "Code de la rue Remix" in the Kennedy album Cicatrice
- 2009: AP feat Dry & OGB - "Tempéraments" in the AP album Discret
- 2009: Sexion d'Assaut feat Dry - "Wati bon son" in the Street CD of Sexion D'assaut L'écrasement de tête
- 2010: Mister You feat Dry, John Steed & Wira - "Vieille meuf" in the Mister You album Présumé coupable
- 2010: 400 Hyènes feat Dry, Zesau, Alpha 5.20, Iron Sy & Beli Blanco - "Union malsaine" in the 400 Hyènes album L'esprit du clan
- 2010: Sexion d'Assaut feat Dry - "Wati by night" in the Sexion d'assaut album L'école des points vitaux
- 2010: Ol Kainry feat Dry - "Beleck" in the Ol Kainry album Au max 2.0
