= TLF (band) =

French rap band

- Also known as: Thug Life Forever, Talents Fachés
- Origin: France
- Genres: Hip hop, urban hip hop
- Years active: 2005-present
- Labels: Talents Fâchés Entertainment; Foolek Empire; Wagram Music (distribution)
- Members: Ikbal Vockal (founder); Alain 2 L'Ombre (founder); Badoo; Yacouba; Edwige (formerly); Lea; Skalp; Awa Imani; Indila
- Website: tlf-officiel.skyrock.com

TLF is a French rap band formed in the 2000s by two MCs from Val-de-Marne, namely Ikbal M'kouboi (known by his alias Ikbal Vockal) and by Alain 2 L'Ombre.

In 2009, Alain 2 L'Ombre left the formation which was reformed on 2010 with Ikbal, Badoo, Yacouba and Edwige. For the TLF live tours in 2010 and 2011, three new members pitched in: Skalp, Awa Imani and Indila and eventually joined the group. Edwige quit in July 2011, and was replaced by Léa. Alain 2 L'Ombre rejoined in 2012.

== Career ==
TLF gained prominence in 2003 with their debut album Talents fâchés (eventually called Talents fâchés Vol. I, a compilation of songs mixed by Kore & Skalp, Rohff, Mafia K-1 Fry, Tandem, Sefyu, La Fouine, Sinik, Kamelancien that promoted a number of artists. It was spearheaded by Ikbal Vockal, an independent music producer alongside Alain 2 L'Ombre who chose to name it TLF (abbreviation for Thug Life Forever). Because of the success of the album, a record label was started name "Talents Fâchés Records".

In 2004, a second album Talents fâchés Vol. 2 was released consolidating the first album. Ikbal and Alain 2 L'Ombre brought in materials from various producers, rappers, Sefyu, Rohff, Tandem, L'Skadrille, Alibi Montana, Sté Strausz followed by Talents fâchés Vol. 3 subtitled La Dalle au mic in 2006 with Rohff, Princess Aniès, Nubi, Médine, Alibi Montana, La Fouine, LIM and finally Talents fâchés Vol. 4 in 2009 subtitled 04 Coins de la France with Rohff, Lim, Larsen, Keny Arkana, Tunisiano, Salif, Alonzo, Nessbeal, Diam's, Soprano. Best of the materials were also included in a compilation Talents fâchés Collector in 2009. A fifth volume of Talents fâchés is planned in 2013.

In between volumes 2 and 3, TLF also released in 2005 a 2-CD sports compilation Rap Performance produced by "Talents fâchés Records".

Besides the compilations, TLF also releases its own albums notably Rêves de rue (2007), Renaissance (2010) and OVNI in 2012 (OVNI meaning Opus Violent Non Identifier), and mixtapes and Ghetto drame street albums.

== Discography ==
=== Studio albums ===
Year	Album	Peak positions
Year	Album	FR
2007	Rêves de rue	26
2010	Renaissance	22
2012	OVNI	29
2016	No Limit	81

Others

- 2011: Renaissance Edition Deluxe

=== Street albums ===
- 2006: Ghetto drame
- 2013: Ghetto drame 2 (upcoming)

=== Mixtapes ===
- 2010: Offishal Remix

=== Compilation albums ===
- 2003: Talents fâchés Vol.1
- 2004: Talents fâchés Vol.2
- 2005: Rap Performance
- 2006: Talents fâchés Vol.3
- 2009: Talents fâchés Vol.4
- 2009: Talents fâchés Collector

=== Singles ===
Year	Album	Peak positions
Year	Album	FR
2008	"Pimp ma Life" (feat. Rohff)	37
2011	"Le meilleur du monde" (feat. Corneille)	28
2011	"Sans regret" (feat. Lara Bellerose)	28
2011	"Ailleurs" (feat. Skalpovich)	27
