= Caractère =

Studio album by Kayliah
- Released: August 24, 2007
- Recorded: 2006–2007
- Studio: Hostile Records
- Genres: R&B; French hip hop
- Length: 48:19
- Language: French
- Label: Parlophone
- Producer: Street Fabulous

Kayliah chronology
On a tous besoin de croire (2005)	Caractère (2007)

Singles from Caractère
- 1. "Caractère" Released: August 20, 2007; 2. "Le test" Released: 2007; 3. "L'hymne du ghetto" Released: 2008

Caractère, which translates into English as "Character", is the second album by French R&B and hip hop singer Kayliah. It was released on August 24, 2007 by Parlophone.

== Track listing ==
No.	Title	Length
1.	"Caractère"	3:08
2.	"Thug Love"	3:25
3.	"Nous on pleure pas"	3:00
4.	"Le test"	3:00
5.	"Ne te retourne pas"	0:37
6.	"Si tu t'en vas"	3:18
7.	"L'hymne du ghetto"	3:17
8.	"À l'époque"	4:00
9.	"Le choix de la vie"	4:00
10.	"Ma déclaration"	4:25
11.	"C'est une bonne journée"	3:44
12.	"Mon premier amour"	4:12
13.	"L'hymne du ghetto" (Freestyle Version) (featuring Alibi Montana, Demon One, D.O.C, Dry, Jacky Brown & Lino)	6:13
14.	"Modjo" (hidden track)	3:27
Total length:		48:19

== Personnel ==
Adapted from AllMusic.

- Kayliah
- Jacky Brown
- Demon One "Intouchable"
- D.O.C
- Dry
- Lino
- Oumar Mafoi
- Pierre Mafoi
- Alibi Montana
- Nabil
- Jean-Pierre Chalbos – Mastering
- Chris Chavenon – Mixing
- Tom Coyne – Mastering
- Erwan Quinio – Engineer, Mixing
- Daniel Romero – Basse

== Charts ==
Chart (2005)	Peak position
France (SNEP)	54
