= Maghrebi communities of Paris =

Ethnic community living in Paris, France

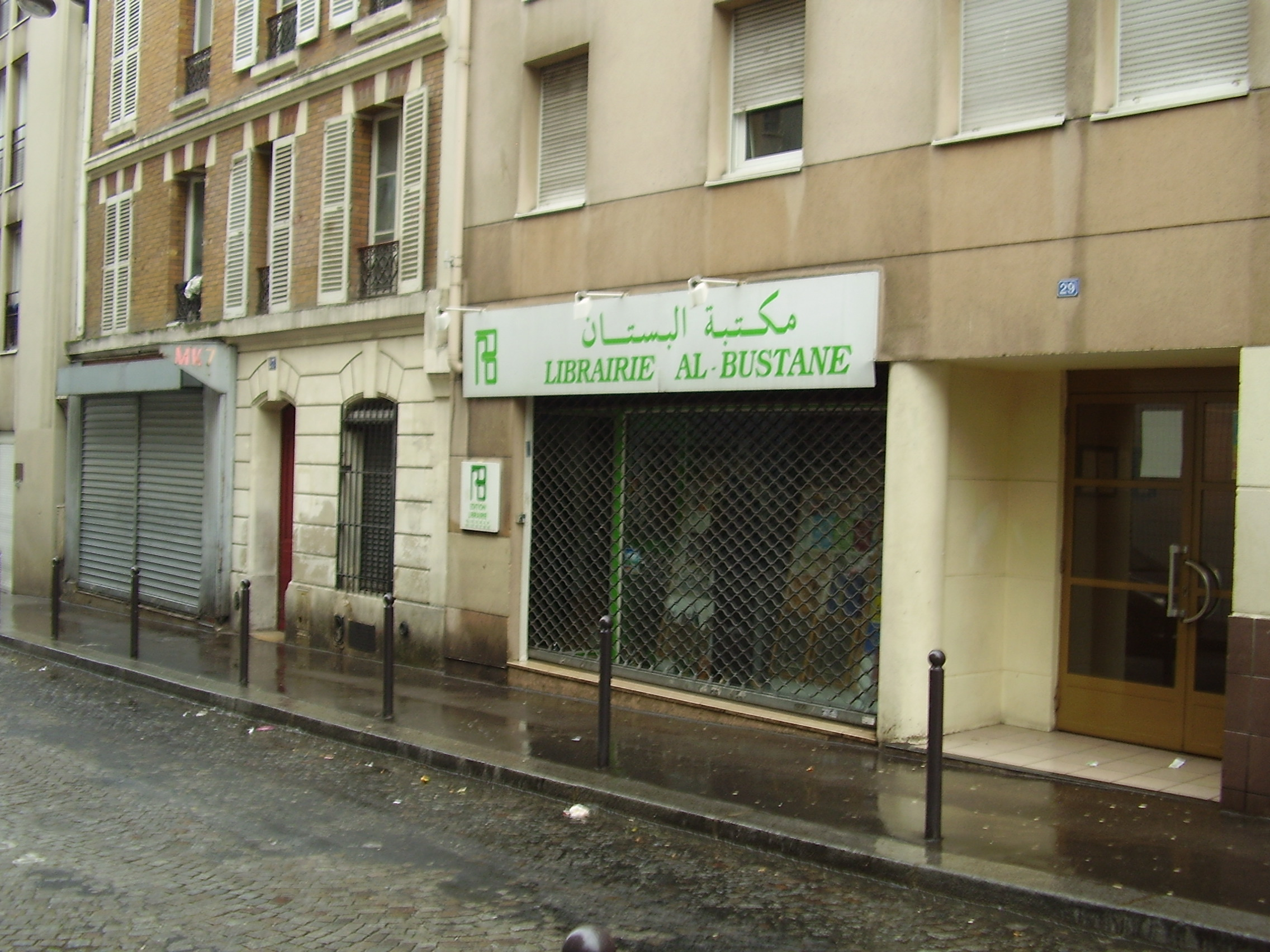
Librairie Al-Bustane ("Al-Bustane Bookshop") (مكتبة البستان) in 18th arrondissement, Paris

The Paris metropolitan area has a large Maghrebi population as a result of French colonial ties to that region. the majority of those of African origin living in Paris come from the Maghreb.

In 2019, the Paris Region had 330,935 Algerians, 253,518 Moroccans and 127,827 Tunisians. in addition, there are thousands of Maghrebi Jews who immigrated during the 1960s.

Naomi Davidson, author of Only Muslim: Embodying Islam in Twentieth-Century France, wrote that as of the mid-20th Century "The "community" of Algerians, Moroccans, and Tunisians, however, was certainly not monolithic, as even the police acknowledged in their discussion of the North African "populations" of the Paris region".

== History ==
According to French police records, there have been Algerian and other Maghrebi residents of the 18th, 19th, and 20th arrondissements of Paris for nearly a century.

Many Maghrebis settled in the city in the 1920s, making up the largest immigrant group to the city during that period. Clifford D. Rosenberg, the author of Policing Paris: The Origins of Modern Immigration Control Between the Wars, wrote that in the post-World War I period Muslims from Algeria, Morocco, and Tunisia may have only adopted a Maghrebi identity after coming to Paris, and this identity "was, at best, partial and bitterly contested", citing conflict between the Algerians and Moroccans in the city.

Andrew Hussey, the author of Paris: The Secret History, wrote that the Maghrebis were also the "most politically contentious" immigrant group and that Parisians perceived the Algerians as criminals, believing that they "were capricious and sly and given to random violence." Even though the Algerians were French citizens, they perceived as not being French due to racial and religious reasons. Many Maghrebi residents took a more negative view of France after the Rif War occurred.

The areas in Paris settled by Maghrebis in the 1920s and 1930s were rue des Anglais, Les Halles, and Place Maubert. In addition a Moroccan community appeared in Gennevilliers and Clichy, Hauts-de-Seine also received Maghrebis.

In 1945 French authorities counted 60,000 Maghrebis. Of them, they included 50,000 Kabyle Berbers, 5,000 to 6,000 Chleuh Berbers, Algerian and Moroccan Arabs, and small Tunisian population. The numbers of students had decreased from the period between the World Wars, and only a small number of the Maghrebis included intellectuals, doctors, and lawyers. Hussey stated that initially Maghrebis settled the same historic communities as they did before. Under French colonial rule, Algeria was a French "department", meaning that Algerian subjects were given significant rights of migration to the French mainland. After 1947 until Algerian Independence in 1962, all Algerians were French citizens with full rights of migration, similar to the situation of Puerto Ricans in the United States.

Naomi Davidson, the author of Only Muslim: Embodying Islam in Twentieth-Century France, wrote that there was a post-World War II perception that Maghrebis were taking over certain neighborhoods but that this was not accurate. She stated that the police records of Maghrebi immigrants from 1948 to 1952, which had their basis in employment figures and ration cards, were "not entirely reliable", and that "it is difficult to establish with any certainty precisely where the different North African immigrant social classes lived in Paris and the suburbs, making it impossible to argue that certain neighborhoods became "Maghrébin" virtually overnight."

The police chief of Paris, Maurice Papon, enacted a repression policy against Algerians in Paris during the years 1958 through 1962. The height of violence against Algerians occurred in September and October 1961. The Paris massacre of 1961 affected the Algerian community.

After the Algerian War, approximately 90,000 Harkis, Muslim Algerians who fought with the French, relocated to France, including in Paris.

In 2005, young male Maghrebians made up the majority of those involved in the rioting in the Paris region. Researcher Nabil Echchaibi reported that the riots were primarily orchestrated by minorities of North and West African descent, mostly in their teens. Almost all the rioters were French second-generation migrants and only about 7 percent of those arrested were foreigners.

== Geography ==
=== Paris ===
Naomi Davidson wrote that Goutte d'Or in Paris in 1948 "appears to have had" 5,720 Maghrebis and that the estimates of Maghrebis in 1952 were 5,500–6,400. It had been perceived to have become Maghrebi in the post-World War II period.

=== Saint-Denis ===
As of 2008, 18.1% of the population of the northern Parisian commune of Saint-Denis was Maghrebian. Melissa K. Brynes, author of French Like Us? Municipal Policies and North African Migrants in the Parisian Banlieues, 1945—1975, wrote that in the middle of the 20th Century, "few of [the Paris-area communes with North African populations] were as engaged with their migrant communities as the Dionysiens [residents of Saint-Denis]."

=== Sarcelles ===
In the 1950s and 1960s, Maghrebians began to arrive in Sarcelles. Political organization came in subsequent decades. Originally the Muslims worshipped in converted makeshift areas, but later purpose-built mosques appeared. In the 1990s Maghrebians were first elected to the commune council. Rahsaan Maxwell wrote that Maghrebians began obtaining "key positions" only in the recent vicinity of 2012 due to "low turnout and weak community organizations".

Sarcelles gained a large population of Maghrebi Jews in the 1960s, mainly from Algeria. As of 2012 many of the Jewish residents have French citizenship.

During the peak immigration of Maghrebi Jews, they subscribed to a belief in assimilation and secularism and they had the Maghrebi belief of what Michel Wieviorka and Philippe Bataille, authors of The Lure of Anti-Semitism: Hatred of Jews in Present-Day France, describe as "a structuring role" that "does not cover all aspects of social life". Beginning in the 1980s, religion became more public and important, and Wieviorka and Bataille stated that the previous Maghrebi practice is "becoming mixed up with the neo-Orthodox practices of the 'young people' for whom religion controls everything."

In 1983 there was a wave of councilors who were Sephardic Jews.

== Language ==
Tim Pooley of the London Metropolitan University stated that the speech of young ethnic Maghrebians in Paris, Grenoble, and Marseille, "conforms, in general, to the classic sociolinguistic pattern of their metropolitan French peers, the boys maintaining marked regional features, generally as minority variants, to a greater extent than the girls." The Maghrebi communities in Paris still maintains great ties to the Arabic Language, specifically a dialect known as Maghrebi Arabic.

== Culture and recreation ==
In 1978 a group of Franco-Maghrebians in Nanterre started a theatre troupe, Weekend à Nanterre. The plays performed by this troupe were about Franco-Maghrebians experiencing conflict from both the French and Maghrebian cultures.

Films set in the Paris area involving Maghrebi characters include Hexagone by Malik Chibane, set in Goussainville, Val d'Oise; and Douce France by Chibane, set in Saint-Denis. Additionally the film Neuilly Yo Mama!, and its sequel Neuilly sa mère, sa mère! take place in the Paris area.

In 2012 Samira Fahim, an owner of a restaurant in the 11th arrondissement of Paris, stated that around 1995, there were many Moroccan and Tunisian restaurants but few Algerian restaurants because many French people visited the former two countries and demanded their cuisine at home, while few French people visited Algeria.

== Notable residents ==
- DJ Snake DJ and music producer (born in 1986)
- DJ Abdel DJ and producer (born in 1970)
- Djamel Abdoun – Footballer (born in 1986)
- Isabelle Adjani – Actress (born in 1955)
- Ali – Rapper (born in 1975)
- Boubaker Ayadi – Author (born in 1949)
- Amir Haddad - Singer (born in 1986)
- Najat Vallaud-Belkacem - Politician (born in 1977)
- Alain Chabat - Film Director (born in 1958)
- Nabil Ayouch – Film director (born in 1969)
- Wallen – R&B singer (born in 1978)
- Tunisiano – Rapper (born in 1979)
- Ramzy Bedia – Actor and humorist (born in 1972)
- Leïla Bekhti – Actress (born in 1984)
- Yasmine Belmadi – Actor (1976–2009)
- Faudel – Rai singer (born in 1978)
- Mehdi Benatia – Moroccan footballer (born in 1987)
- Hatem Ben Arfa – Footballer (born in 1987)
- Amel Bent – Singer (born in 1985)
- Rachid Bouchareb – Algerian filmmaker (born in 1953)
- Rim'K – Rapper (born in 1978)
- Elsa Cayat – Charlie Hebdo employee (1960–2015)
- Jamel Debbouze – Actor (born in 1975)
- Myriam El Khomri – Politician (Parti socialiste), current Minister of Labour (born in 1978)
- DJ Mehdi – hip-hop and house producer (1977–2011)
- Razzy Hammadi – Politician (Parti socialiste), deputy (born in 1979)
- Pascal Cherki - Politician (born in 1966)
- Pascal Elbé - Actor (born in 1967)
- Vincent Elbaz - Actor (born in 1971)
- Sinik – Rapper (born in 1980)
- Kamelanc' – Rapper (born in 1980)
- Reda Kateb – Actor (born in 1977)
- Bariza Khiari – Politician (Parti socialiste), senator (born in 1946)
- Michaël Youn - Actor, Singer, Comedian (born in 1973)
- Chérif and Saïd Kouachi – Perpetrators of the Charlie Hebdo shooting
- Lââm – Singer (born in 1971)
- Mister You – Rapper (born in 1984)
- La Fouine – Rapper (born in 1981)
- Sabrina Ouazani – Actress (born in 1988)
- Mabrouck Rachedi – Writer (born in 1976)
- Zineb El Rhazoui – Charlie Hebdo employee
- Nessbeal – Rapper (born in 1978)
- Indila – R&B singer and songwriter (born in 1984)
- Saïd Taghmaoui – Actor and screenwriter (born in 1973)
- Georges Wolinski – Charlie Hebdo employee (1934–2015)
- Roschdy Zem – Actor and filmmaker (born in 1965)
- Éric Zemmour – conservative journalist and author (born in 1958)
- Lacrim – Rapper (born in 1985)

The fictional Bilal Asselah, of Nightrunner, is a Frenchman of Algerian origins raised in the Parisian suburbs.

== See also ==
- Algerians in France
- Moroccans in France
- Tunisians in France
- Arab diaspora
- Arabs in France
- Berbers in France
- Pied-Noir
