= Mokobé =

French-Malian rapper

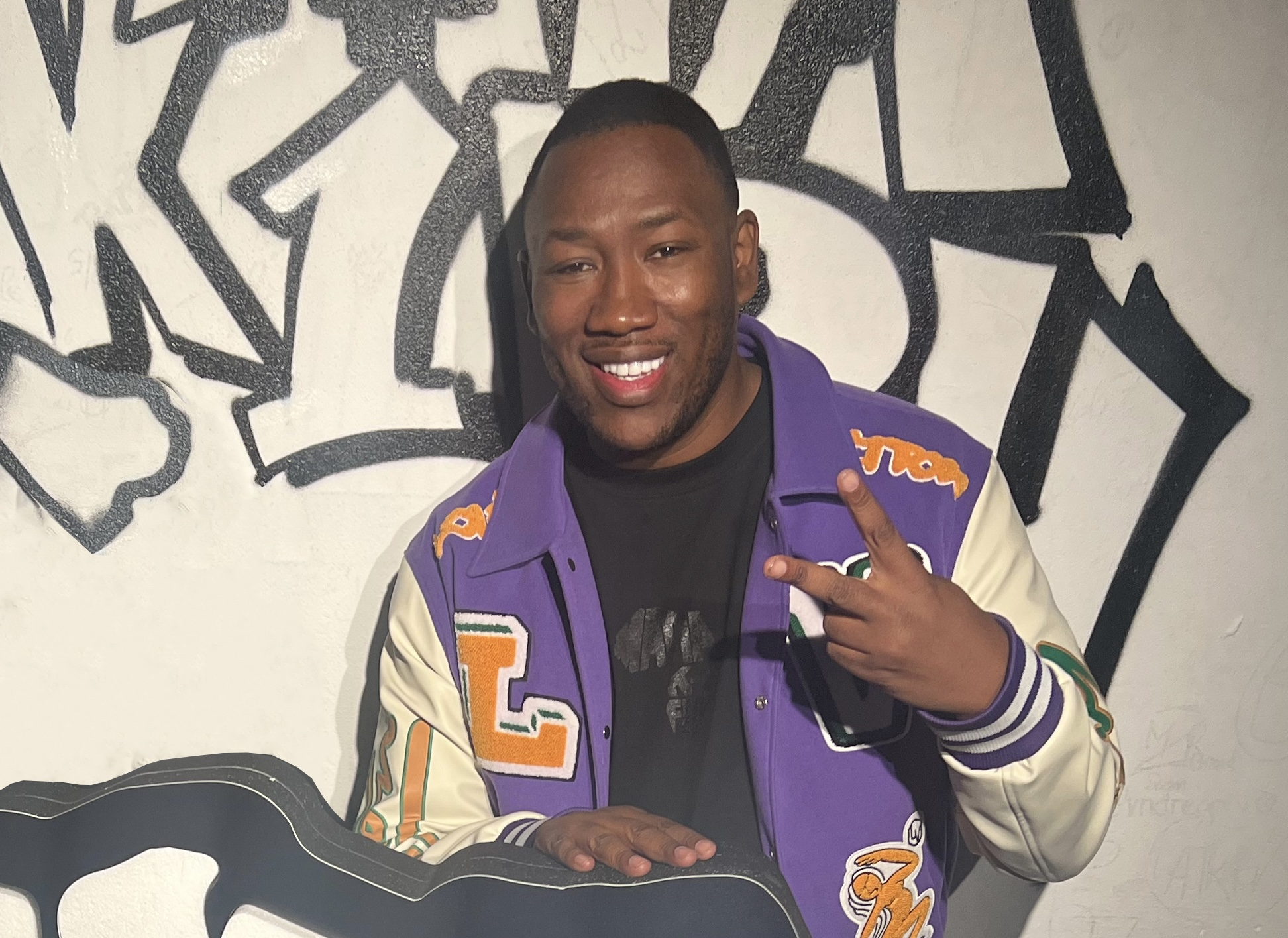

Background information
- Born: Mokobé Traoré; 24 May 1976 (age 50); Vitry-sur-Seine, France
- Genre: Hip hop
- Occupation: Rapper

Mokobé Traoré (born 24 May 1976 in Vitry-sur-Seine, France), better known by the mononym Mokobé, is a Malian–French rapper and part of the music collective 113 alongside Rim'K and AP and within the greater French musical project and collective Mafia K-1 Fry. He also has his own solo career with two album releases Mon Afrique in 2007 and Africa Forever in 2011.

== Life and Career ==
Mokobé was born to a Malian–Senegalese father and a Malian–Mauritanian mother. He was a founding member of 113 and his works appeared in the collective albums of the band. He was also actively involved in the artistic aspects of the band and took part in the live shows of the band. He was also responsible for the band's mediatic image (Visuals, music videos, DVDs, interviews, public relations), becoming a de facto manager of the 113 operations.

His solo album Mon Afrique was in collaboration with David Tayorault in Abidjan and was released on 11 June 2007. Le Molare, Tiken Jah Fakoly, Oumou Sangaré, Patson, Fally Ipupa, and hip hop stars like Diam's and Booba.

His album Africa Forever included collaborations with Soprano), Nathalie Bleue, Oumou Sangare, Despo Rutti, Fode Baro, J-Mi Sissoko, Jah Cure, Mbaye Dieye Faye, Soumbill and Apocalypse.

== Discography ==
=== Solo albums ===
Year	Album	Peak positions	Certification
Year	Album	FR	Certification
2007	Mon Afrique	18	
2011	Africa Forever	35	

=== Albums with 113 ===
- 2000: Les Princes de la ville (certified platinum)
- 2002: 113 fout la merde (certified gold)
- 2003: Dans L'urgence (reedition) (certified gold)
- 2005: 113 Degrés (certified gold)
- 2010: Universel

=== Singles ===
Year	Title	Peak positions	Album
Year	Title	FR	Album
2007	"C'est dans la joie" (feat. Patson)	9	Mon Afrique
2011	"Oulala" (feat. DJ Arafat)	29	Africa Forever
2014	"CDouxDeh"	117	
2014	"Getting Down" (feat. P-Square)	17	
2015	"Wesh (#TuMeDisDesWesh) " (feat. Gradur)	8	
2016	"J'ai trop dansé"	42	
2018	"Wakanda"	11	

Other releases

- 2011: "50 CFA"
- 2011: "Taxi Phone" (feat. Soprano)
- 2012: "Africa For Ever" (feat. Jah Cure)

Featured in

Year	Album	Peak positions	Album
Year	Album	FR	Album
2012	"Happy Birthday" (Matt Houston feat. Mokobé)	160	
2015	"Chupluskleurkeul" (Jaymax VI & Salomé Je T'aime feat. Mokobé)	55	
