= Ça ira (song) =

Single by Joyce Jonathan

from the album Caractère
- Released: February 1, 2013
- Genre: pop
- Length: 3:45
- Label: Polydor (Universal Music Group)
- Composer: Fabien Nataf
- Lyricist: Joyce Jonathan
- Producer: Jo Francken

Joyce Jonathan singles chronology
"Tant pis" (2011)	"Ça ira" (2013)	"Caractère" (2013)

Music video
- "Ça ira" on YouTube

"Ça ira" is a song by French singer Joyce Jonathan. It was originally released by her as a single in early 2013. Then the song was included on her studio album Caractère, which appeared in June of the same year.

== Writing and composition ==
The song was written by Joyce Jonathan and Fabien Nataf. The recording was produced by Jo Francken.

Its title and refrain lyrics are possibly a wink to famous revolutionary song Ça Ira (1790).

== Track listing ==
Digital promo single (February 1, 2013) – Polydor (UMG)

1. "Ça ira" (3:45)

Digital promo single (July 8, 2013) – Polydor (UMG)

1. "Ça ira (Remix)" (3:44)

== Charts ==
Chart (2013)	Peak position
Belgium (Ultratop 50 Wallonia)	25
France (SNEP)	16
