= Tout le monde en parle =

Tout le monde en parle may refer to:

- Tout le monde en parle (Canadian talk show)
- Tout le monde en parle (French talk show)
- "Tout le monde en parle", a 2004 song by Karlito & Rak from Street Lourd Hall Stars
