= Qui est l'exemple? =

Single by Rohff featuring Kayliah

from the album La Vie avant la mort
- B-side: "Miroir, miroir"; "Creuset 2 voyous" (CD maxi); "TDSI" (12")
- Released: February 2002
- Recorded: 2001
- Genre: R&B, rap
- Length: 3:50
- Label: Virgin Music, EMI, Delabel
- Songwriters: Doltz, Rohff, Reego
- Producer: Manu Key

Rohff featuring Kayliah singles chronology
| "TDSI" (2001) | "Qui est l'exemple?" (2002) | "5,9,1" (2002) |

"Qui est l'exemple?" is a 2001 song recorded by French artists Rohff & Kayliah. It was the third single from his debut album, La Vie avant la mort, and was released in late 2001 in a CD maxi, then in February 2002 in a CD single. It achieved huge success in Belgium (Wallonia), Switzerland and particularly in France where it topped the chart. To date, it is the singer's biggest hit and can be considered as his signature song.

The refrain of the song is sung by Kayliah and contains a sampling of 1981 hit single "Your love" of the band Lime, but plays lower.

As of August 2014, it was the 56th best-selling single of the 21st century in France, with 379,000 units sold.

== Track listings ==
CD single

1. "Qui est l'exemple?" — 3:50
2. "Miroir, miroir" — 4:30
3. "Qui est l'exemple?" (instrumental) — 3:21
4. "Miroir, miroir" - Video

CD single

1. "Qui est l'exemple?" — 3:50
2. "Miroir, miroir" — 4:30
3. "Qui est l'exemple?" (instrumental) — 3:21
4. "Miroir, miroir" (video)

CD maxi

1. "Qui est l'exemple?" — 4:03
2. "Miroir, miroir" — 4:34
3. "Creuset 2 voyous" — 5:29
4. "Qui est l'exemple?" (instrumental) — 3:22
5. "Miroir, miroir" (video)

12" maxi

1. "Qui est l'exemple?" — 3:50
2. "Qui est l'exemple?" (instrumental) — 3:18
3. "Qui est l'exemple?" (a cappella) — 3:50
4. "TDSI" — 3:50
5. "TDSI" (instrumental) — 3:50

== Credits ==
- Produced by Kore & Skalp
- Vocals by Kayliah

== Charts and certifications ==
=== Weekly charts ===
| Chart (2002) | Peak position |
|---|---|
| Belgian (Wallonia) Singles Chart | 5 |
| French SNEP Singles Chart | 1 |
| Swiss Singles Chart | 3 |

=== Year-end charts ===
| Chart (2002) | Position |
|---|---|
| Belgian (Wallonia) Singles Chart | 9 |
| Europe (Eurochart Hot 100) | 27 |
| French Singles Chart | 8 |
| Swiss Singles Chart | 23 |

=== Certifications ===
| Country | Certification | Date | Sales certified |
|---|---|---|---|
| Belgium | Gold | 4 May 2002 | 20,000 |
| France | Platinum | 10 July 2002 | 500,000 |
