= Kayliah =

French singer

- Born: Karine Bordy; July 2, 1981 (age 44); Créteil, France
- Origin: Guadeloupe
- Genres: Hip hop; R&B; soul
- Occupations: Singer; rapper
- Years active: 2002-present
- Labels: Parlophone Music France; Hostile Records

Karine Bordy (born July 2, 1981, Créteil, France), known as Kayliah, is a French singer.

== Early life ==
From a musician family and from Guadeloupe, Kayliah has been writing and interpreting since she was young. She writes a first album at the age of 17 and becomes the mother of a little girl at 19 years old. She collaborates with Rohff, Pit Baccardi and Eloquence, as well as on the original soundtrack of Taxi 3, Ong Bak, Banlieue 13 and the French version of the movie Coach Carter and she will make herself known thanks to "Ouvre les yeux" with Wallen.

In 2005, she released her first studio album On a tous besoin de croire with singles "Belly Dance", "Quand une fille est love" and "Les choses essentielles". In 2007, long limited to the role of guest with many singles to his credit, she released her second studio album Caractère, produced by Street Fabulous. In 2009, she released a single "Bouge" with Guadeloupe singer Admiral T. In 2010, she collaborates with Mac Tyer on "Tout est fini", with TLF on "Message du caractère" and Alex Tony on "Pourquoi revenir maintenant".

== Discography ==
=== Studio albums ===
- On a tous besoin de croire (2005)
- Caractère (2007)
