= Demon One =

French rapper

- Born: Hakim Sid; 2 July 1975 (age 50); Choisy-le-Roi, Val-de-Marne, France
- Genres: Hip hop, French hip hop
- Years active: 1994-present
- Label: Wati B

Hakim Sid (born 2 July 1975), better known by his stage name Demon One, is a French rapper of Algerian origin.

== Life and Career ==
Hakim Sid, born in Choisy-le-Roi, Val-de-Marne of an Algerian father and a French mother, started rapping at a very young age. He was friends with M.S. (Mansa Konaté). He is a founding member of Intouchable alongside Dry (real name Landry Delica).

Demon One made his first appearance with Dry, M.S. in 1994. In 1996, Intouchable became part of the rap collective Mafia K-1 Fry. In 1997, Mamad joined Intouchable.

Demon One appeared with some solo work in the second album of Ideal J Le combat continue in 1998 with the track "L'amour". In 2000, Intouchable released their debut album Les points sur les I and started a tour with rap band 113.

Demon One also released solo tracks on various Mafia K-1 Fry projects. In 2005, Intouchable released their second studio album La vie de rêve. Thanks to the track "La gagne" with Tonton David, Intouchable gained a lot of fame.

In 2007, Demon One launched "Votez pour moi" (meaning vote for me). In June 2007, he released his solo street album Mon rap with many unpublished tracks most notably "Monsieur le Maire" addressed to mayor of Choisy-le-Roi. In January 2008, he returned with a full studio album Démons et merveilles.

In November 2011, he announced his withdrawal from the Mafia K'1 Fry collective.

Demon One's biggest hit in France was the 2008 single "J'étais comme eux" featuring Soprano.

== Discography ==
=== Albums, Mixtapes ===
Solo - Demon One

Year	Album	Charts	Notes	Certification
Year	Album	FR	Notes	Certification
2007	Mon rap	-	Street album	
2008	Démons et merveilles	24	1st studio album	
2021	Demonstrada 2.0	-	2nd studio album	

As Intouchable

- 2000 : Les points sur les I
- 2001 : I Have a Dream (maxi)
- 2004 : Original Mix-Tape (mixtape)
- 2005 : La vie de rêve

In collective Mafia K'1 Fry

- 1997 : Les liens sacrés
- 1999 : Légendaire
- 2003 : La cerise sur le ghetto
- 2007 : Jusqu'à la mort

=== Singles ===
Year	Single	Charts	Notes	Certification
Year	Single	FR	Notes	Certification
2008	"J'étais comme eux" (featuring Soprano)	16		

=== Appearances ===
Main

- 2001: Demon One - "Une histoire" in compilation Vitry club
- 2003: Demon One feat OGB - "Freestyle" in the mixtape Pur son ghetto Vol. 2
- 2004: Demon One - "La rue c'est moi" in the compilation Talents fâchés 2
- 2005: 113 feat Demon One - "C'est même pas la peine" in the 113 album 113 degrés
- 2005: Demon One - "Le feu dans le ghetto" in the compilation Police partout justice nulle part
- 2006: Demon One - "La rage" in the compilation Phonographe
- 2009: Demon One feat L.I.M, Selim du 9.4 & Boulox Force - "La danse des lears-dea" in the compilation Street lourd 2 hall stars

Featured in

- 2005: Sté Strausz feat Demon One & Alibi Montana - "Pour l'argent" in the Sté Strausz album Fidèle à moi-même
- 2007: Al K-Pote feat Demon One - "Banlieues chaudes" in the Street CD of Al K-Pote, Sucez-moi avant l'album
