= Intouchable =

French rap band

- Genres: Rap, Hip hop
- Years active: 1992 – present
- Label: Wati B
- Members: Demon One; Dry
- Past members: M.S. (disappeared 1998); Las Montana (died 1999); Mamad (died 2003); Kimbak du 94 (died 2004); Mokem; Nordine; Pro176

Intouchable is a French rap band from Choisy-le-Roi, Val-de-Marne, founded in 1992 by rappers Dry and Demon One. They are also part of the rap/urban collective Mafia K-1 Fry.

Besides important collaborations with the collective, the band released two albums, Les points sur les I in 2000 and La vie de rêve in 2005, as well as a mixtape and a maxi EP. Band members Dry and Demon One also released, in their turn, individual albums, mixtapes etc.

== Members ==
Main members were Demon One and Dry. But Intouchable had, at one time, a number of other member rappers. But more than one member's departures was in tragic circumstances

- M.S. (real name Mansa Konaté) - disappeared in 1998 after being suspected of murdering a motorist on the route nationale 7.
- Las Montana (real name Lassana Touré) - died in 1999 in very strange circumstances
- Mamad - (real name Mamadou Doucouré) - died in 2002 found dead in march 2003 murdered
- Kimbak du 94 - (real name Kimbakou Kasoma) - died in 2004 shot in Montfermeil
- Mokem - left the band
- Nordine
- Pro176

== Discography ==
=== Albums ===
As Intouchable

Year	Album	Charts	Notes	Certification
Year	Album	FR	Notes	Certification
2000	Les points sur les I	-	1st studio album	
2001	I Have a Dream	-	Maxi	
2004	Original Mix-Tape	-	Mixtape	
2005	La vie de rêve	30	2nd studio album	

Solo - Demon One

Year	Album	Charts	Notes	Certification
Year	Album	FR	Notes	Certification
2007	Mon rap	-	Street album	
2008	Démons et merveilles	24	1st studio album	
2021	Demonstrada 2.0	-	2nd studio album	

Solo - Dry

Year	Album	Charts	Notes	Certification
Year	Album	FR	Notes	Certification
2008	De la pure pour les durs	54	Street tape	
2009	Les derniers seront les premiers	25	1st studio album	
2012	Tôt ou tard	18	2nd studio album	
2013	Maintenant ou jamais	13	3rd studio album	
2021	Dysnomia	-	4th studio album	

In collective Mafia K-1 Fry

- 1997 : Les liens sacrés
- 1999 : Légendaire
- 2003 : La cerise sur le ghetto
- 2007 : Jusqu'à la mort

=== Singles ===
As Intouchable

Year	Single	Charts	Notes	Certification
Year	Single	FR	Notes	Certification
2004	" Ça fait plaisir" (Rohff featuring Intouchable)	53		
2005	"La gagne" (Intouchable feat. Tonton David)	40		

=== Appearances ===
(These are appearances as a band. For solo appearances, see Demon One and Dry pages)

As Intouchable (main)

- 1998: Intouchable feat 113 & Ideal J - "La voie que j'ai donné à ma vie" in compilation album Nouvelle donne
- 2001: Intouchable - "Freestyle" on the mixtape Pur son ghetto Vol. 1
- 2001: Intouchable feat OGB - "Rap local" in the compilation Vitry club
- 2003: Intouchable feat OGB - "Trouble" on soundtrack of film Taxi 3
- 2003: Intouchable feat Rohff & Kamelancien - "La hass" in the compilation Street lourd hall stars
- 2004: Intouchable feat Rohff - "Warriorz" in soundtrack of film Banlieue 13
- 2005: Intouchable - "Rap haute performance" in compilation Rap performance
- 2006: Intouchable feat Tonton David - "La gagne"
- 2006: Intouchable feat Courti Nostra - "Amène tes oreilles" in the compilation Street couleur
- 2006: Intouchable feat Natty - "Trop vite" in the compilation Street couleur
- 2006: Intouchable - "Mafia K'1 Fry" in the compilation Independenza labels
- 2006: Intouchable - "La puissance vient du ghetto" in the compilation album Kontract killer
- 2006: Intouchable - "La niak" in the compilation Hip Hop fight
- 2006: Intouchable feat Adams - "Interdit en radio" in the compilation Interdit en radio Vol.2
- 2007: Intouchable feat Massil, Ritax & Pobouf - "La vie d'un jeune" in the compilation 1^{re} escale
- 2007: Intouchable - "Novembre 2005" in the compilation Block story
- 2007: Intouchable - "Hymne à la racaille" in the compilation Représente ta rue Vol.2
- 2007: Intouchable - "Chant de bataille" in the compilation Ghetto truands & Associés
- 2007: Intouchable feat Alibi Montana & SMS Click - "Tout le monde à terre" in the compilation Premier combat Vol.1
- 2007: Intouchable feat Six Coups MC & Sir Doum's - "Les vrais escrocs sont en costard" in the compilation Parole d'escrocs

As Intouchable (featured in)

- 1999: Rohff feat Intouchable - "Manimal" in the Rohff album Le code de l'honneur
- 1999: 113 feat Intouchable - "Hold up" in 113 album Les princes de la ville
- 1999: Kennedy feat Intouchable - "La haine au cœur" in Kennedy's maxi Kennedy le sale gosse
- 2001: Oxmo Puccino feat Intouchable - "Les raisons du crime" in Oxmo Puccino album L'amour est mort
- 2001: Manu Key feat Intouchable - "A vive allure" in Manu Key's album Manuscrit
- 2001: Poésie Urbaine feat Intouchable & M. Clyde - "Sorti de nulle part" in the Poésie Urbaine maxi Réflexion sèche
- 2004: Rohff feat Intouchable - "Çà fait plaisir" in Rohff album La fierté des nôtres
- 2004: Alibi Montana feat Intouchable - "Le son du ghetto" in Alibi album 1260 jours
- 2005: WWO feat Intouchable - "Smak chwili" in the WWO album Witam was w rzeczywistości
- 2006: Booba feat Intouchable - "Au fond de la classe" in the Booba album Ouest Side
- 2006: Seven feat Intouchable - "Ça fout l'seum" in Seven's album Mode de vie étrange
- 2007: Manu Key feat Intouchable - "Le genre de mec" in Manu Kay album Prolifique Vol. 2
- 2007: Beli Blanco feat Intouchable - "Enragés"
- 2007: Sang Pleur feat Intouchable & Siko - "Block O.P.ratoire" in the compilation album Block O.P.ratoire
- 2008: Kayliah feat Intouchable, Lino, Jacky & 2 Bal - "L'hymne du ghetto Remix" in the Kayliah album Caractère
- 2008: L'Skadrille feat Intouchable - "T'as joué au con Part II" in the L'Skadrille album Des roses et des flinugues
- 2008: Gooki feat Intouchable & Dawala - "Mon Rap" in the Gooki album Trop de choses à dire
- 2009: Mister You feat Intouchable - "Le Guide de la débrouille" in Mister You album Misteur You, Arrete you si tu peux
- 2011: Assoce 2 Malfrats feat Intouchable - "Pour ceux qui ont oublié" in the Assoce 2 Malfrats album L'amour du danger
