= Elsa Cayat =

French psychoanalyst and columnist (1960–2015)

- Born: 9 March 1960; Sfax, Tunisia
- Died: 7 January 2015 (aged 54); Paris, France
- Cause of death: Homicide by shooting
- Resting place: Jewish section of Montparnasse cemetery
- Occupations: Psychiatrist and psychoanalyst, as well as columnist
- Years active: 1988–2015
- Employer: Charlie Hebdo
- Known for: Her books and columns in Charlie Hebdo related to psychology
- Notable work: A Man + A Woman = What? Desire and the Whore: The Hidden Stakes of Male Sexuality
- Partner: Paulus Bolten
- Children: Hortense (daughter)
- Relatives: A sister Beatrice, a brother Frederick, and cousins Sophia Bramley and Jacqueline Raoul-Duval

Elsa Jeanne Cayat (French: [ɛlza kaja]; 9 March 1960 – 7 January 2015) was a French psychiatrist and psychoanalyst and a columnist for the satirical newspaper Charlie Hebdo in Paris, France. She was one of 12 victims of the Charlie Hebdo shooting and was killed along with the seven journalists, maintenance worker, one visitor and two police officers. She was the only woman working for Charlie Hebdo to die in the attack. She was one of two Jews killed in the attack, along with Georges Wolinski.

== Personal Life ==
Elsa Cayat was born on 9 March 1960 in Sfax, Tunisia. Cayat's father, Georges Khayat, was a Tunisian Jew and practicing gastroenterologist, while her mother worked in the legal profession. Her family moved to Vincennes (suburb of Paris) when she was a toddler.

Elsa Cayat was a companion of Paulus Bolten, a shoe designer, and the couple had one daughter, Hortense.

Cayat was 54 years old when she was murdered in Paris, France, on 7 January 2015. She was buried in the Jewish section of the Montparnasse Cemetery.

== Career ==
Elsa Cayat was a psychiatrist and psychoanalyst, as well as a columnist.

She qualified as a doctor at 21, and later practiced as a psychiatrist and psychoanalyst in Paris. She published books related to psychology. Her first book was published in 1998, A Man + A Woman = What? In 2007, she published her second book Desire and the Whore: The Hidden Stakes of Male Sexuality. Cayat also helped write chapters in the books Mastering Life and Dangerous Childhood, Childhood in Danger?

Cayat wrote the biweekly column Charlie Divan (Charlie on the Couch) in the satirical magazine Charlie Hebdo. Cayat believed that she could help people find meaning in their personal life and emotional difficulties through her column in Charlie Hebdo.

== Death ==
Elsa Cayat had received threats in connection with her religion and work at Charlie Hebdo over the phone about a month prior to the attack. She continued to write her column after the threats, dismissing them as "verbal garbage". A patient of Cayat said "She feared nothing."

Since the satirical Charlie Hebdo had been printing cartoons about the Prophet Mohammed, it had become a target for Islamic terrorists. On 7 January 2015, brothers Saïd Kouachi, 34, and Chérif Kouachi, 32, opened fire in the Charlie Hebdo offices. The attackers were believed to be a part of an Iraqi jihadist network. The two gunmen came into an editorial meeting, killing Elsa Cayat along with several others. The attackers used automatic rifles killing twelve people. After they killed those who were on their list, they shouted "We have killed Charlie Hebdo! We have avenged the Prophet Mohammed!"

== Context ==
Charlie Hebdo is a satirical magazine, which was under threat because it had created a series of cartoons about Muhammad. Also, right before the shooting, the magazine tweeted a cartoon of the ISIS leader Abu Bakr al-Baghdadi. Charlie Hebdo was trying to show that ISIS had not won and never would. The office had been threatened many times and firebombed. The French government tried to make Charlie Hebdo hold back on publishing some of its cartoons, but they continued to publish the cartoons because of their support for freedom of speech. The shooters, who were masked, killed only certain cartoonists that they had called out, and later yelled "We have avenged the prophet.".

== Impact ==
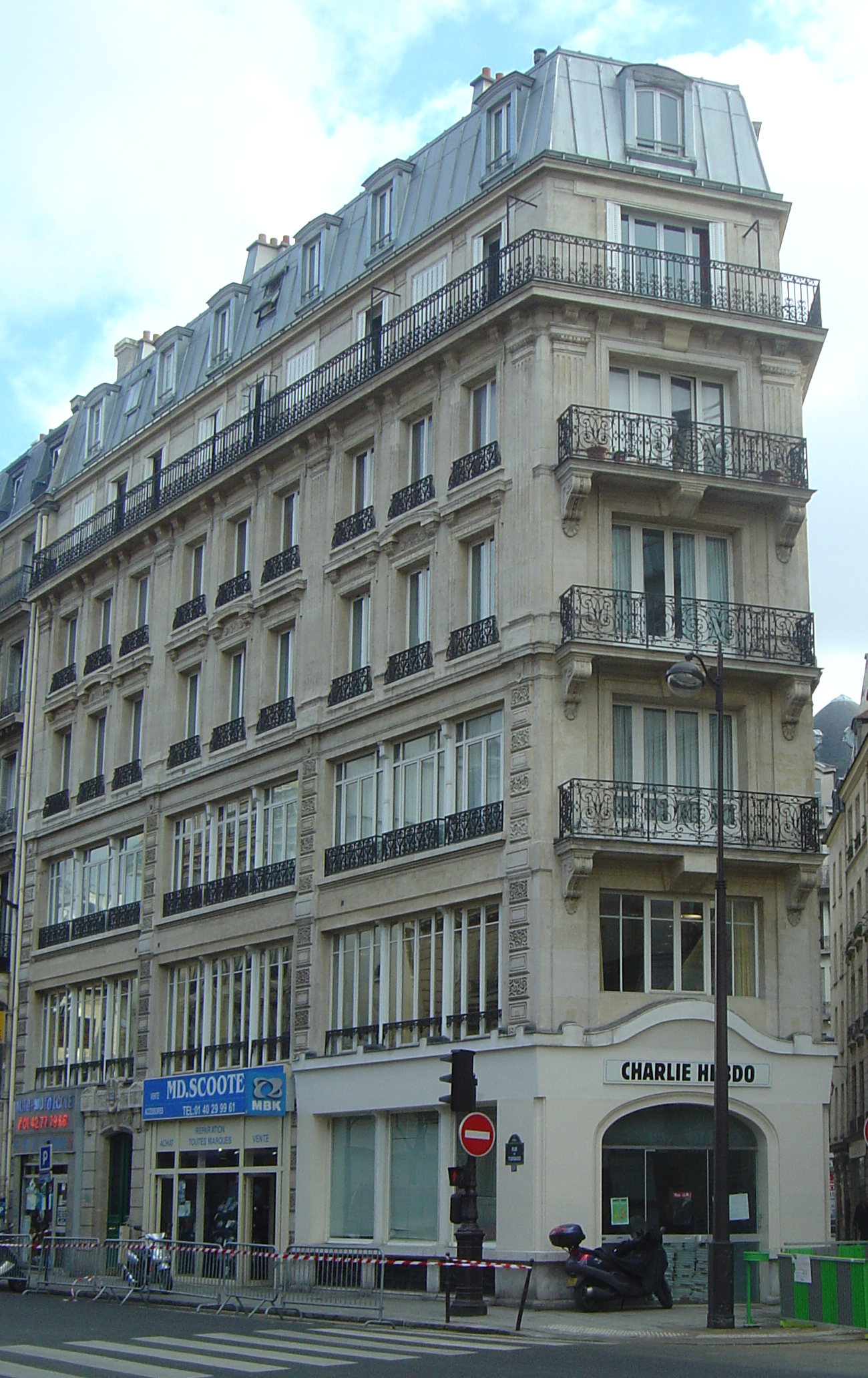
Former headquarters of Charlie Hebdo

Among the twelve who died at the Charlie Hebdo office, Elsa Cayat was the only woman on staff who was shot.

Cayat's family believed she was killed because she was Jewish, based on earlier phone threats. A couple of weeks before the shooting, Cayat received several anonymous calls telling her to quit, and saying that she would be killed because she was Jewish. The phone calls stated "You should stop working for Charlie Hebdo, otherwise we're going to kill you." Her family said she dismissed the threats as "verbal garbage". The shooters had a chance to kill another female employee, Sigolène Vinson, but spared her life, saying, "We don't kill women."

== Reactions ==
"Je Suis Charlie" ("I am Charlie") became the motto for those who believe in a free press and supported the victims killed at the Charlie Hebdo office.

After the attacks, several funds were set up to help those who were affected by the attacks on Charlie Hebdo. Fundraisers were also set up to help the victims' families, and the funeral funds of the Jewish cartoonists who were killed. Within 24 hours of the shooting, the French press had raised approximately $590,000 (half a million euros) so that the magazine could publish over 1,000,000 copies of the next issue instead of its normal run of 60,000 copies.

Cayat's funeral was the point of departure for an extended meditation on man's relation to death, mourning and consolation by her friend, the feminist rabbi Delphine Horvilleur.

== Writings ==
- 1998: Un Homme + Une Femme = Quoi? (A Man + A Woman = What?), Paris, Jacques Grancher ISBN 9782228901857
- 2007: Le Désir et La Putain (Desire and The Whore), a dialogue with Charlie Hebdo journalist Antonio Fischetti, Paris, Albin Michel ISBN 9782226179272
- 2015: La Capacité de s'aimer (The Capacity to Love Each Other), Paris, Payot ISBN 2228913332

== Awards ==
In 2015, Elsa Cayat received the Legion of Honour award.

== See also ==
- Charlie Hebdo shooting
- Maghrebian community of Paris
- List of journalists killed in Europe
