= Joyce Jonathan =

French singer (born 1989)

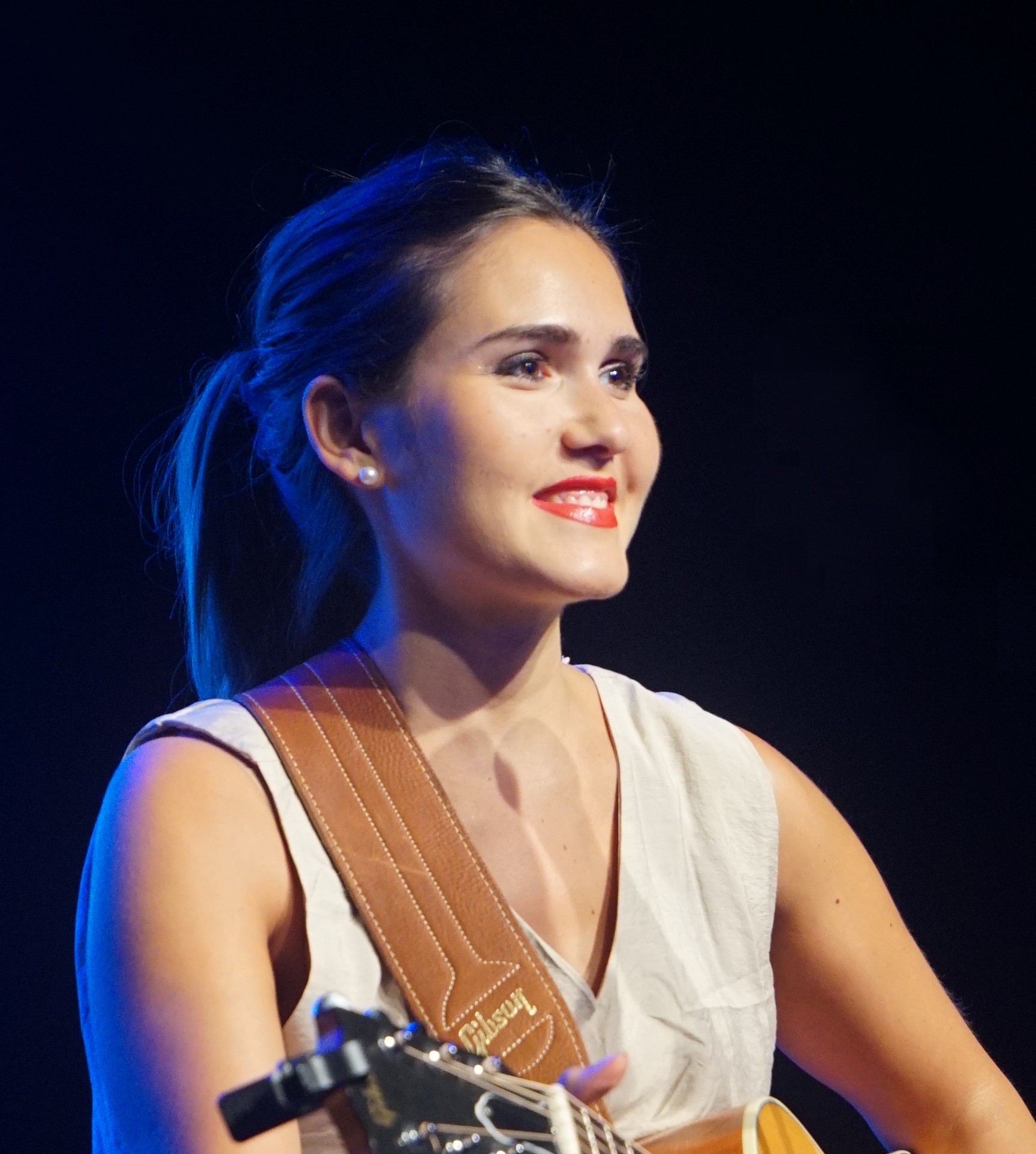

Background information
- Born: 3 November 1989 (age 36)
- Origin: Levallois-Perret, France
- Genres: French pop; folk; variety
- Occupation: Singer
- Instruments: Vocals, guitar
- Years active: 2007–present
- Labels: My Major Company (2007–2012); Universal Music Group (2012–2017); Believe Digital / Play Two (2018–present)

Joyce Jonathan (born 3 November 1989) is a French singer and songwriter.

Her first album Sur mes gardes went gold in May 2010 only five months after its release, and was certified platinum less than a year later. On 23 January 2011 she received the NRJ Music Awards for Francophone Breakthrough of the Year.

== Early life ==
Joyce was born in Levallois-Perret, the youngest of a family of three girls. Her mother is the director of a travel agency and her father is an architect. She was educated at the École alsacienne in Paris, and studied psychology at the university level.

At the age of seven, she learned to play the piano and began composing her first songs secretly. She pursued her musical interests with voice and piano lessons, being influenced by artists such as Teri Moses and Tracy Chapman.

At the age of 16, Joyce Jonathan posted three of her compositions on the site MySpace, promoting them to Michael Goldman, co-founder of the new label My Major Company .

In December 2007, at the age of 18, Joyce Jonathan was launched on the website of the label My Major Company. On 13 May 2008, 486 internet backers provided the 70,000 euros needed to start production of her album. Six months after its release, the web-producers of Joyce Jonathan had already recouped their investment

== Career ==
With internet backing, Jonathan began recording her first album in 2008, with the help of Louis Bertignac (guitarist of the band Téléphone). Reputedly impressed by the talent and voice of the young artist, he agreed to assist her on the arrangement of her songs, working together with her in his studio for a year. Joyce also recorded a duet with Tété, Sur mes gardes.

Her two singles, "Je ne sais pas" and "Pas besoin de toi", were included in her first album "Sur mes gardes," released in January 2010, and certified gold after only five months. In August, the album ranked first in sales of albums for download.

In 2011, she won the category Francophone Breakthrough of the year of the NRJ Music Awards 2011. She has just recorded a song "Mystères" with Pétula Clark.

Her second album, Caractère, was released in June 2013, including the single Ça ira. She was nominated at the NRJ Music Awards for best female singer and best song.

Joyce Jonathan released her song "Le Bonheur" in September 2015. It is the first single of her 3rd album, Une place pour moi, which was released on 5 February 2016.

On 4 May 2018, Joyce Jonathan released her single "On", which is also a track on her album of the same name, which was released in October 2018.

In May 2021, Jonathan began releasing singles in anticipation of her sixth studio album, Les p'tites jolies choses. The complete album was released on 25 March 2022 and has two parts. The first, part "A" has 12 songs with a more pop style and includes the titular song and others such as "À la vie comme à la mort" with Jason Mraz. Part "B," also titled Toi et moi, has six songs with more jazz influence and was co-written and co-produced with Ibrahim Maalouf.

In 2024, she participated in season 5 of the Chinese variety show Sisters Who Make Waves / Ride the wind 2024, featuring 36 female celebrities aging from 29 to 54, from different sectors of the entertainment industry, including singers, actors, dancers, etc. Jonathan was one of the 7 foreign participants. And she is only foreign player in a team with 12 members.

== Personal life ==
Jonathan gave birth to her first child, a daughter named Ghjulia, on 2 November 2020. She has not, however, revealed the full identity of the father, who is originally from Corsica.

When they were both attending the École alsacienne, she had a relationship with politician and former Prime Minister Gabriel Attal, but Jonathan said that the relationship was merely "a joke between us" and "a playtime crush".

In 2024, she was invited to participate in Mango TV’s self-produced music competition variety show——"Chengfeng 2024".

== Discography ==
=== Studio albums ===
Year	Album	Peak positions			Certifications
Year	Album	FRA	BEL (Wa)	SWI	Certifications
2010	Sur mes gardes	17	43	—	SNEP: Platinum
2013	Caractère	16	29	—	
2016	Une place pour moi	24	41	66	SNEP: Gold
2018	On	51	183	—	
2022	Les p'tites jolies choses	48	57	—	

=== Singles ===
Year	Title	Peak positions		
Year	Title	FRA	BEL (Wa)	SWI
2011	"Pas besoin de toi"	100	21*	64
2011	"Je ne sais pas"	65	16	–
2011	"Tant pis"	–	10*	–
2013	"Ça ira"	16	25	–
2014	"Caractère"	183	40*	–
2014	"T'en va pas"	68	–	–
2015	"Le Bonheur"	135		
2016	"Les filles d'aujourd'hui" (featuring Vianney)	29	26*	
2018	"On"	38		–
2021	"Les p'tites jolies choses"			
2021	"À la vie comme à la mort" (featuring Jason Mraz)			
2022	"T'es beau, t'es beau"			
2022	"Je m'en vais pas"			
2022	"Toi et moi"			

*Did not appear on the official Belgian Ultratop 50 charts, but rather on the Ultratip chart.
