= Alibi Montana =

French rapper (born 1978)

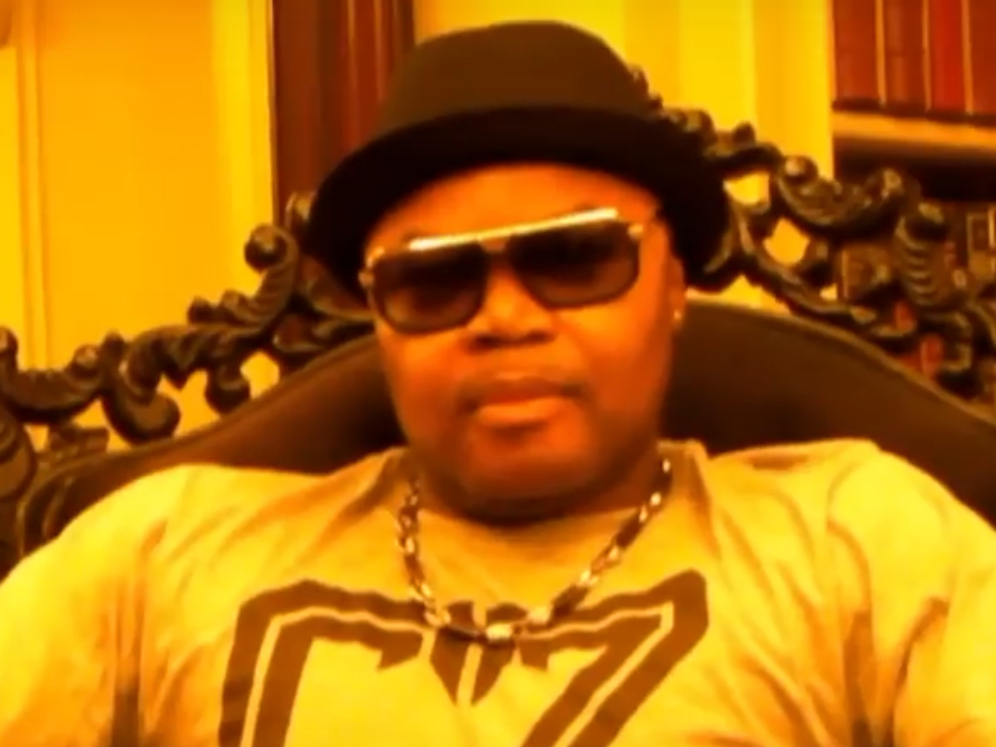
Alibi Montana in 2014

Nikarson Saint-Germain better known by his stage name Alibi Montana (born 1978 in Villetaneuse, Seine-Saint-Denis, France) is a French rapper of Haitian origin.

== Career ==
Alibi Montana, born in Villetaneuse, moved to the city of 4000 at La Courneuve, where he started his career in the 1990s with debut album T'as ma parole released in 1999, followed by the compilation Mandat de dépôt in 2002. He was jailed for attempted homicide for more than three-and-a-half years. After release from jail, Menace Records run by Bayes released in May 2004 his album 1260 jours (being the exact number of days of imprisonment). Alibi Montana became the prominent rapper of the label.

In 2005 he released Numéro d'écrou where he collaborated with a number of hip hop artists including Rohff, Calbo (of Ärsenik), Zoxea, LIM, Princess Aniès etc. He collaborated with LIM co-authoring a new album Rue with him about street life. It was followed by a second album in the series Toujours ghetto.

He released, le Block, yet another collaboration, this one with Zone and Kheimer. Quitting Menace Records, he signed with Because, where he released his fourth album Inspiration guerrière. After two new mixtapes, he released the album Prêt à mourir pour les miens.

== In popular culture ==
He took part in a TV series Seconde B. In 2002, he appeared in the compilation "Lisa et Hip hop funk rap" with his contribution in the episode. Alibi Montana has released a series of mixtapes called Toujours ghetto with many remixes and featuring many artists. He has also collaborated with LIM in the series Rue about streetlife. He appeared in 2010 with the comedian Max Boublil in "Max Boublil clash Alibi Montana" He later on attacked Boublil for "racist" attitudes in the tongue in cheek music video that was made, pointing out to the double standards of comedians being allowed to say anything whereas rappers are taken to task for their lyrics. In 2010, he took part in Un geste pour Haïti Chérie on the occasion of the 2010 Haiti earthquake. Many artists and personalities were also featured including Anthony Kavanagh, Zazie, Youssoupha, Grégory, Michel Drucker, Daan Junior, Thierry Cham, Jacky, Pit Baccardi, Ben J, Ophélie Winter, Lilian Thuram, Erik, Sonia Rolland, Roselmack, Cesária Évora, Lynnsha, Noémie Lenoir and Charles Aznavour.

== Personal life ==
Alibi Montana was jailed for attempted homicide for more than three-and-a-half years. He never apologized or admitted the alleged offence. In 2004, the French police summoned him again to question him about the identity of two hooded persons pulling visibly automatic weapons during a DVD the rapper had released in 2004. Because of the track "Gros Didier", appearing in Toujours ghetto Vol. 2, he was involved in a lawsuit with François Grosdidier, a French member of Parliament in Union pour un mouvement populaire (UMP). Alibi Montana has a younger brother Alino. In 2009, he released a joint album with his younger brother under the title Une affaire de famille.

== Discography ==
=== Albums ===
Solo

Year	Album	Peak positions
Year	Album	FR
1999	T'as ma parole	–
2004	1260 jours	94
2005	Numéro d'écrou 8460-F	30
2007	Inspiration Guerrière	15
2008	Prêt à mourir pour les miens	59

Joint albums

Year	Album	Description	Peak positions
Year	Album	Description	FR
2005	Rue	Jointly with LIM	26
2006	Le Block	Jointly with Zone & Kheimer	–
2009	Une affaire de famille	Jointly with Alino (his younger brother)	185
2013	Rue 2	Jointly with LIM	58

Compilations

- 2002: Mandat de dépôt
- 2006: Crise des banlieues Vol. 1
- 2006: T'as ma parole révolution
- 2007: Crise des banlieues Vol. 2
- 2010: Anthologie Vol. 1 (Best Of)
- 2012: Ennemie de l'état

=== Mixtapes ===
Year	Album	Peak positions
Year	Album	FR
2005	Toujours Ghetto Vol. 1	–
2005	Toujours Ghetto Vol. 2	157
2006	Toujours Ghetto Collector	–
2007	Mixtape	–
2008	Toujours Ghetto Vol. 3	123
2008	Illegal Life	–
2007	Sur le terre-terre	–
2011	Toujours Ghetto Vol. 4	–
