= Mafia K-1 Fry =

Hip hop collective in France

Background information
- Origin: France (Hip hop collective)
- Genres: French hip hop Rap
- Years active: 1994-2007
- Past members: Kery James; Manu Key; DJ Mosko; 113; Dry (rapper); Teddy Corona; Karlito; OGB; Mista Flo; Jessy Money; Selim du 9.4; M.S. (disappeared); Las Montana (died); Mamad (died); Yezi l'Escroc; Titi l'Ancien; Lil Jahson; Mokem; Kimbak du 9.4; Popa Project; Nordine; Patrice Timal; R.A.K; DJ Mehdi (died); Demon One; Rohff; Pro176
- Website: Official website

Mafia K-1 Fry sometimes stylized as Mafia K'1 Fry is a French collective of hip hop artists, rappers, beatboxers, DJs, MCs and music producers mostly coming from the Val-de-Marne and the Orly-Choisy-Vitry-Joinville axis (being locations in Orly - Choisy-le-Roi - Vitry-sur-Seine -Joinville-le-Pont), suburbs located south of Paris.

It was founded in 1995 with an initiative by Douma le Parrain. The name Mafia K'1 Fry comes from a rap verse during a freestyle improvised in à Orly at the "Demi-Lune": "Tu peux pas test avec la Mafia K'1 Fry," (You can't f*ck with the Mafia K'1 Fry") with "K'1 Fry" being a verlan term for africain, hence, translated into English, African Mafia. It was also known as "L'Union" and later "113 Clan". Las Montana was also a leader in the group that suffered from many legal problems as many of its members went to prison on certain charges. The members of Intouchable were hit by even bigger problems with a series of deaths of its members like Mamad, Las Montana and M.S.

The diverse group concentrated on Hip-Hop, but there were also breakdancers like Mokobé, Selim du 94 and Teddy Corona, graffiti artists like AP and Douma, backers like Las Montana, Mamad, Rocco, OGB, beatboxers like Mista Flo and DJs like DJ Mehdi and DJ Mosko.

Besides solo projects by many of its members, the collective realised two mini albums: Les Liens Sacrés and Légendaire before departure of Kery James in 2003 (he rejoined in 2007), and death of certain members most notably Las Montana and disappearance of M.S. Some members had big commercial success like 113 and Rohff and Intouchable (with Dry, Demon One and Mamad) before Mamad's death in 2003 just after the collective joint album La cerise sur le ghetto, which marked the release of music videos for "Pour ceux" and "Balance" .

The period was marked by the departure of Popa Project and Rohff although keeping some nominal relations with the collective, with Rohff. In 2007, the collective released its biggest successful album Jusqu'à la mort (#7 in French albums chart). Mafia K'1 Fry will be releasing a new title in 2012.

== Members ==
Refer to infobox on right

== In popular culture ==
- A documentary about the collective titled Si tu roules avec la Mafia K'1 Fry also found great success (both critically and commercially). The DVD release went platinum.
- The collective launched its line of Mafia K'1 Fry clothing.

== Discography ==
(Titles under the name of the collective. For individual albums, see various member pages)

- 1997: Les liens sacrés
- 1998: Légendaire
- 2003: La cerise sur le ghetto
- 2007: Jusqu'à la mort

Street Lourd Compilations

Street Lourd is a series of compilations from various members of Mafia K'1 Fry and guests. The initial compilation was released in 2004. A second series was released in 2010 with tracks and collaborations by Rohff, Kery James, Kool Shen, La Fouine, Sinik, Kamelancien, Soprano, Nessbeal, Sefyu, Rim'K, Mister You, Youssoupha, Tunisiano, Despo Ruti, Zesau, Meh, RR, Alkapote, Salif, Shone, SixCoups MC, Mista Flo, Seth Gueko, Alpha 5.20, AP (of 113), Nubi Sale, L.I.M, Selim du 94, Demon One, Dry, Boulox, Larsen, Arsenik (Lino and Calbo), Mam's Maniolo, Bushy, TLF (Ikbal, Karlito), OGB, Médine, Le Rat Luciano, Alonzo, Teddy Corona, Brasco, Ghetto Youss, Aketo, Niro, Skomoni

- 2004: Street Lourd Hall Stars
- 2010: Street Lourd Hall Stars II

Individual albums

- 1992: Ideal J - La vie est brutale
- 1995: Different Teep - La route est longue
- 1996: Ideal J - Original Mc's sur une mission
- 1996: Ideal J - Cash Remix
- 1996: Manu Key - Regarde moi bien toi
- 1997: Different Teep - La rime urbaine
- 1997: Opération coup de poing
- 1998: 113 - Truc de fou
- 1998: 113 - Ni barreau, ni barrière, ni frontière
- 1998: Ideal J - Le combat continue
- 1998: OGB - Rap offensif
- 1998: Manu Key - Manu Key
- 1998: Rohff - Le Code de l'honneur
- 1999: 113 - Les princes de la ville
- 2000: Manu Key - 94 Ghetto Vol.1
- 2000: Intouchable - Les points sur les i
- 2000: Manu Key -Manuscrit
- 2001: Karlito - Contenu sous pression
- 2001: Yezi l'Escroc - Les choses de la vie
- 2001: Intouchable - I have a dream
- 2001: Kery James - Si c'était à refaire
- 2001: 113 - 113 Fout la merde
- 2001: OGB - Vitry Club
- 2002: DJ Mehdi - The Story of Espion
- 2002: 113 - Dans l'urgence (réédition)
- 2002: Rohff - La vie avant la mort
- 2003: Rohff - Le son c'est la guerre
- 2004: Kery James - Savoir & vivre ensemble
- 2004: Rim'K - L'enfant du pays
- 2004: Intouchable - D'hier à aujourd'hui
- 2004: Rohff - 94
- 2004: Rohff - La fierté des nôtres
- 2004: Manu Key - Prolifique Vol.1
- 2004: DJ Mosko, Teddy Corona, Mista Flo - Street lourd hall stars
- 2005: Rohff - Charisme
- 2005: Kery James - D'hier à aujourd'hui
- 2005: Kery James - Ma vérité
- 2005: Rohff - Ça fait plaisir
- 2005: Intouchable - La vie de rêve
- 2005: OGB - OGBest of collector
- 2005: 113 - 113 Degrés
- 2005: Rohff - Au-delà de mes limites
- 2006: DJ Mehdi - Lucky Boy
- 2006: Manu Key - Street tape collector
- 2006: OGB - Enfermé dehors
- 2006: Karlito & No.nord - Ozas
- 2006: 113 - Illegal Radio
- 2007: DJ Mehdi - Lucky Boy at Night
- 2007: Rohff - Au dela de mes limites Classics (réédition)
- 2007: Manu Key - Prolifique Vol.2
- 2007: Mokobé - Mon Afrique
- 2007: OGB - Combien savent
- 2007: Rohff - Le Cauchemar Du Rap Français Vol 1
- 2007: Demon One - Mon Rap
- 2007: Rim'K - Famille Nombreuse
- 2008: DJ Mosko - DJ Mosko en mode Live
- 2008: Demon One - Démons & Merveilles
- 2008: Kery James - A l'ombre du show business
- 2008: Dry - De la pure pour les durs
- 2008: Mafia K'1 Fry - Légendaire (réédition)
- 2008: OGB & L'équipe - Esprit d'équipe
- 2008: Rohff - Le Code de l'horreur
- 2009: AP - Discret
- 2009: Manu Key - Collector
- 2009: Kery James - Réel
- 2009: Dry - Les derniers seront les premiers
- 2009: Rim'K - Maghreb United
- 2009: Rohff - Zénith Classics (CD/DVD Live)
- 2010: DJ Mosko, Teddy Corona, Mista Flo - Street lourd hall stars 2
- 2010: 113 - Universel
- 2010: Rohff - La Cuenta
- 2011: OGB - La Mémoire
- 2011: Mokobé - Africa Forever
- 2012: Dry - Tôt ou Tard
- 2012: Demon One - Les Fleurs du Mals
- 2012: Rohff - Le Padre du Rap Game
- 2012: Kery James - 92-2012 (compilation)
