= Tonton David =

French reggae musician (1967–2021)

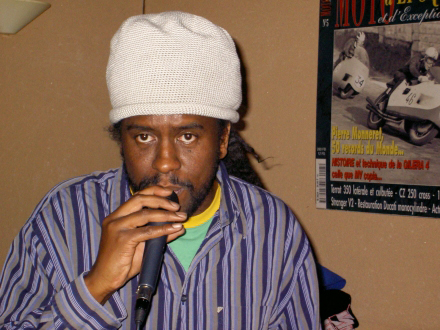
- Tonton David performing in 2006
- Born: David Grammont; 12 October 1967; Paris, France
- Died: 16 February 2021 (aged 53); Nancy, France
- Resting place: Champigny-sur-Marne cemetery
- Other name: Ray David
- Occupation: Singer
- Years active: 1988-2021

David Grammont (12 October 1967 – 16 February 2021), better known under his stage name Tonton David was a French Reggae singer born in Paris. He was renowned for his raggamuffin performances, but used influences of soul music, gro kâ (from the French West Indies), the Zairian rumba.

== Biography ==
Tonton David had a turbulent childhood in a suburb of Paris. He left his family aged 14 and had a successful career in music with songs featuring powerful and political lyrics. In 1990, Tonton David had his big break when he was featured in a TV report about "Black Paris". Following that performance, Tonton David was signed by the Virgin record label. Shortly after, he recorded "Peuples du monde", which was featured in French rap compilation Rapattitude.

Le blues de la racaille released on 2 December 1991, was his debut album in which he explored social issues such as unemployment, poverty and racism, becoming a figurehead for a whole generation of disenchanted French youth. In 1991, he performed in front of an audience of 12,000 music fans at the Fête des Kafs in Saint Denis, La Réunion and in 1992 at Reggae Sunsplash festival in Kingston, Jamaica. In 1993, he released his second album Allez leur dire recorded in Memphis, Tennessee. "Sûr et certain" taken from the same album was released as a single. 1995 saw his biggest success to date with the release of the song "Chacun sa route", which was used in the soundtrack of the film Un indien dans la ville. His third album Récidiviste in 1995 included the single "Pour tout le monde pareil" and featured a collaboration with rai star Cheb Mami in "Fugitifs". His fourth album Faut qu'ça arrête was more heavily influenced by Haitian music, after he collaborated with Haitian musician Papa Jube. Victim of a stroke in Metz, France, his death was announced 2 days later in hospital of Nancy, on 16 February 2021.

== Discography ==
=== Albums ===
- 1991: Le blues de la racaille
- 1994: Allez leur dire
- 1995: Récidiviste
- 1999: Faut qu'ça arrête
- 2002: Best Of (compilation album)
- 2005: Babelou, la gagne
- 2006: Livret de famille
- 2006: Il marche seul
- 2009: Ma gouille

=== Singles ===
- 1990: "Peuple du monde" (FR #32)
- 1994: "Chacun sa route" (with K.O.D.)
- 1994: "Sûr et certain" (FR #9)
- 1994: "Ma Number One" (FR #17)
- 1994: "Il marche seul" (FR #29)
- 1995: "Fugitif" (with Cheb Mami (FR #30)

Featured in

- 2005: "La gagne" (Intouchable feat. Tonton David) (FR #40)
