= Wallen (singer) =

- Born: Nawell Azzouz; January 23, 1978 (age 48); Saint-Denis, France
- Genres: R&B; French hip hop
- Occupations: Singer; rapper
- Years active: 1995–2014
- Spouse: Abd al Malik (m. 1998)
- Website: www.wallen-lesite.com

Nawell Azzouz, better known as Wallen (born January 23, 1978) is a French singer. Her stage name comes from the rearrangement of the letters of her first name.

She was born in Saint-Denis, France, to Moroccan parents from Berkane. As a child, she learned to play the violin and developed a passion for singing. She grew up listening to funk, hip hop, and R&B.

Influenced by Aaliyah, Wallen made her recording debut with producer Sullee B Wax, and rapper Sté Strass. In 1998, she was featured on the French RnB compilation "24 Carats", with "Je ne pleurs pas" (I'm not crying).

Her first hit came with "Celle Qui Dit Non" with the rapper Shurik'n. In 2004, she released the album Avoir La Vie Devant Soi which includes the singles "Bouge Cette Vie", "L'Olivier", and "Donna"'. She also sang with Usher on the French version of "U Got It Bad".

With Abd al Malik and a few other rappers she created a group called Beni Snassen, that recorded an album under that name.

In 2008, she released her 3rd album Misericorde. On February 9, 2011, the album Château rouge by Abd al Malik, in which she participated, was crowned with a Victoire de la musique. In 2014, she collaborated on the soundtrack of the film Qu'Allah bless la France, from which the clip L'Amour fou is extracted.

== Personal life ==
She is married to the French rapper Abd al Malik. Wallen has one child and has stopped singing to concentrate on raising her child.

== Discography ==
=== Albums ===
Year	Album	Peak positions	Certification
Year	Album	FR	Certification
2001	À force de vivre	8	
2004	Avoir la vie devant soi	12	
2008	Miséricorde	25	

=== Singles ===
Year	Album	Peak positions			Album
Year	Album	FR	BEL (Wa)	SUI	Album
2001	"Celle qui a dit non (feat. Shurik'n)"	13	26 (Ultratop)	–	À force de vivre
2001	"Mes rêves"	32	–	–	À force de vivre
2004	"Bouge cette vie" (feat. Lord Kossity)	35	–	–	Avoir la vie devant soi
2004	"Donna"	10	33 (Ultratop)	69	Avoir la vie devant soi
2005	"Charisme" (Rohff with Wallen)	27	9 (Ultratip)	–	Rohff album La fierté des nôtres
2005	"L'olivier"	21	–	–	Avoir la vie devant soi
2008	"Business"			–	Miséricorde

Featured in

Year	Album	Peak positions		Album
Year	Album	FR	BEL (Wa)	Album
2011	"Mon amour" (Abd al Malik feat. Wallen)	67	2 (Ultratip)	Abd al malik album Château Rouge
