= LIM (rapper) =

French rapper and producer

Salim Lakhdari (born in July, 1979 in Boulogne-Billancourt (Paris), France), more commonly known as LIM, is a French rapper and producer of Kabyle Algerian origin.

== Biography ==
LIM began rapping in 1990 at the age of 10 with the group Mo'vez Lang, made up of his neighborhood friends Boulox Force (Djibi Diop) and Cens Nino (Houcene Marega).

In 2005, LIM released his debut solo album entitled Enfant Du Ghetto, which featured Mo'vez Lang, Cheb Yahya, Cici and Mala.

On October 22, 2007, LIM released his second solo album entitled Délinquant. In its first week, the album finished as the top selling album in all categories in France with 12,000 copies sold and would later go on to achieve gold status.

He has worked with many of France's top rappers including Rim'K, Booba and Manu Key.

== Tous Illicites Productions ==
Originally signed with the 45 Scientific label, LIM left it after some internal problems and made his own label called Tous Illicites Productions. On top of releasing his own albums and mixtapes, LIM has used the label to give many youths in the Parisian banlieues an opportunity with free studio time and financial support to release albums.

== Discography ==
=== Solo albums ===
- 2005: Enfant Du Ghetto
- 2007: Délinquant
- 2010: Voyoucratie
- 2016: Pirates

=== Group albums ===
- 1999: Héritiers De La Rue (with Mo'vez Lang)
- 2003: Original Street Tape (with Mo'vez Lang)
- 2005: RUE (with Alibi Montana)
- 2008: Associés a vie (with Mo'vez Lang)
- 2009: Evolution Urbaine (with Zeler)
- 2010: Combinaison Dangereuse (with Meiday)
- 2013: RUE 2 (with Alibi Montana)

=== Mixtapes and compilations ===
- 1997: Dans La Sono (Beat De Boul Compilation)
- 1999: Dans La Ville (Beat De Boul Compilation)
- 2002: Violences Urbaines (Mixtape)
- 2004: Double Violences Urbaines (Mixtape)
- 2006: Triple Violences Urbaines (Mixtape)
- 2010: Illicite Rai (with RAT)
- 2014: Violences Urbaines 4
