= Rohff =

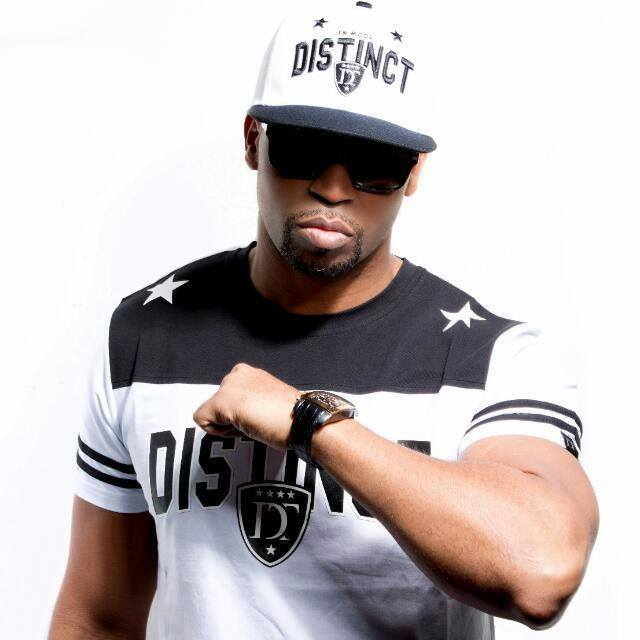

Background information
- Also known as: Rohff
- Born: Housni M'Kouboi; 15 December 1977 (age 48); Antananarivo, Madagascar
- Origin: Vitry-sur-Seine, Val-de-Marne, Île-de-France, France
- Genre: French hip-hop
- Occupations: Rapper; fashion designer; Music executive
- Years active: 1994–present
- Labels: Foolek Empire; East West Music; Warner Music
- Website: roh2f.com

Housni M'Kouboi (French: [usni (ɛ)mkubwa]; born 15 December 1977), better known as Rohff and at times stylized as Roh2f, is a French rapper.

== Biography ==
Born in Antananarivo, Madagascar, to a family of Comoran origin, he immigrated in 1985 to France living in Vitry-sur-Seine, in south suburbs of Paris. His stage name Rohff (French pronunciation: [ʁɔf]) stands for "Rimeur Original Hardcore Flow Fluide".

Rohff began rapping around 1990 and in 1999, he participated in the production of the album Première Classe (First Class), working on the track "On fait les choses" alongside Neg'Marrons, Mystik, and Pit Baccardi, and started becoming known to a larger audience. He is a member of the Mafia K'1 Fry, a group of rappers from Val-de-Marne composed. The group released the album Légendaire (Legendary) in 1999.

The same year, Rohff began to write his first solo album to be released in 1999 under the title Le Code de l'Honneur (The Code of Honor). Tracks included "Appelle-moi Rohff," "Catastrohff," "Skyrohff," "Rohff Vs l'État", "Les Nerfs à Vifs", "Génération sacrifiée," and "Manimal." Encouraged by the success of his first album, in September 2001, he released a second album La Vie Avant la Mort (Life Before Death). The album sold around 250,000 copies with tracks like "TDSI" "Get Down, Sam'di Soir" and "5-9-1" as a duet with Assia, and a single off the album.

But it was the single "Qui est l'exemple?", released in the spring of 2002, that gave him his big breakthrough, selling roughly 750,000 copies. It also became his debut on the major national radio stations in France.

In 2006, he recorded "La Resurrection" as one of the soundtracks for the video game Scarface: The World is Yours.

In 2008, Rohff released his fifth album Le Code de l'horreur ending up selling 200,000 copies followed by the album La Cuenta in 2010 with sale of 80,000 copies and a gold certification.

After a three-year hiatus, he returned in 2013 for his seventh album P.D.R.G., making it his third double album release.

== Judicial cases ==
In 2005 Rohff was sentenced to four years of imprisonment, three of which were suspended for firing a gun at two people at the exit of a nightclub in Ivry-sur-Seine in 2002. However, he was not incarcerated.

On July 21, 2007, he participated with Kery James and some friends in a fight with MC Jean Gab'1, following the latter's release "J't'emmerde" where he dissed several French rappers including Rohff.

On the night of July 23, 2007, Rohff was arrested by the police in Barbusse, Joinville-le-Pont, for carrying a .357 Magnum gun, with which he had threatened his little brother. Placed in custody in Villejuif the following day, Rohff was tried in Créteil. He was sentenced on July 26, 2007, to 5 months in prison for "possession of weapons". He was incarcerated at the Fresnes Prison. He left prison on November 27, 2007, on the occasion of the concert of 50 Cent in Bercy, where Rohff performed as opening artist. He remained for several months on parole with an electronic bracelet.

On April 21, 2014, in the late afternoon, Rohff was involved in a violent attack in a clothing store in the 1st arrondissement of Paris distributing Unküt, the brand of the rapper Booba. Rohff was part of as gang that wrecked the store and beat up one of the shop workers. Having been caught on camera, the rapper surrendered himself to the French police accompanied by his lawyer and was placed in custody. He confessed to the investigators that he had taken the first shots to the victim. As a result of this assault, Rohff was detained.

On Monday, September 26, 2016, his wife filed a complaint against him at the police station of Saint-Maur-des-Fossés for domestic violence. Maeva Anissa, a former companion of Rohff also complained of similar treatment. Complaint was withdrawn after his wife said her family advised her to drop the charges as she didn't want her son to "have a dad in jail". Rohff was released on September 29.

On October 27, 2017, Rohff was sentenced to five years in prison for "aggravated violence", as a result of the charges against him regarding the assault in Unküt three years earlier. On June 6, 2019, the court of appeals confirmed his guilt increasing the sentence to 5 years in prison. He was released conditionally on 22 November 2019, after serving part of his sentence. He was released from the electronic surveillance device that he had been wearing on 24 February 2020.

== Discography ==
=== Albums ===
Year	Album	Peak positions				Certifications
Year	Album	FR	BEL (Fl)	BEL (Wa)	SWI	Certifications
1999	Le code de l'honneur	–	–	–	–	FR: Gold
2001	La vie avant la mort	5	–	26	89	FR: Platinum
2004	La Fierté des Nôtres	5	–	27	37	FR: Platinum
2005	Au delà de mes limites	3	–	–	64	FR: Platinum
2008	Le code de l'horreur	4	–	27	–	FR: Platinum
2010	La cuenta	11	–	53	92	FR: Platinum
2013	P.D.R.G. (Pouvoir, Danger, Respect & Game)	2	110	4	25	FR: 2× Platinum
2015	Le Rohff Game	14	–	23	61	FR: Platinum
2018	Surnaturel	6	–	32	45	FR: Platinum
2021	Grand monsieur	11	–	28	60	FR: Gold
2024	Fitna	9	–	92	–	

Album reissues

Year	Album	Peak positions
Year	Album	FR
2007	Au-delà de mes limites – Classics	27

Mixtape

Year	Album	Peak positions
Year	Album	FR
2004	1994-2004: 10 ans d'avance	–
2007	Le cauchemar du rap français : Chapitre 1	22

Live albums / DVDs

Year	Album	Peak positions
Year	Album	FR
2009	Zenith Classics	97

Albums / EP with Mafia K-1 Fry

- 1997: Liens sacrés
- 1999: Légendaire
- 2003: La cerise sur le ghetto
- 2007: Jusqu'à la mort (reedition)

=== Singles ===
(Selective)

Year	Single	Peak positions				Certification	Album
Year	Single	FR	BEL Wa Ultratop	BEL Wa Ultratip	SWI	Certification	Album
2001	"R.O.H.F.F"	72	–	–	–		La vie avant la mort
2001	"TDSI"	28	–	–	–		La vie avant la mort
2002	"Qui est l'exemple?	1	5	–	3		La vie avant la mort
2002	"5.9.1" (feat. Assia)	15	39	–	–		La vie avant la mort
2004	"94"	68	–	–	–		La fierté des nôtres
2004	"Le son qui tue" (with Natty)	17	3	–	19		La fierté des nôtres
2005	"Zone internationale" (with Roldan G. Rivero)	45	37	–	62		La fierté des nôtres
2005	"Charisme" (with Wallen)	27	–	9	–		La fierté des nôtres
2005	"Ça fait plaisir" (with Intouchable)	53	–	11	–		La fierté des nôtres
2005	"La puissance"	14	–	3	–		Au-delà de mes limites
2006	"Starfuckeuz'"	55	–	–	84		Au-delà de mes limites
2006	"La résurrection"	37	–	–	–		Au-delà de mes limites - Classics
2012	"K-SOS Musik"	18	–	21	–		P.D.R.G. (Pouvoir, Danger, Respect & Game) (Saison 1 & 2)
2013	"Dounia"	29	–	43	–		P.D.R.G. (Pouvoir, Danger, Respect & Game) (Saison 1 & 2)
2013	"J'accélère"	19	–	41	–		P.D.R.G. (Pouvoir, Danger, Respect & Game) (Saison 1 & 2)
2014	"Soleil"	80	–	–	–		
2015	"Suge Knight"	40	–	–	–		
2015	"Rohff Game"	50	–	–	–		Rohff Game
2016	"Dans le game"	119	–	–	–		
2017	"Hors de contrôle"	64	–	–	–		
2017	"Saturne"	60	–	–	–		
2017	"Broly"	94	–	–	–		
2017	"Détrôné" (feat. Nej')	114	–	–	–		
2018	"Dans le vrai"	111	–	–	–		
2018	"Hors de prix"	–	–	–	–		
2020	"#TCT"	194	–	–	–		
2020	"Solo"	145	–	–	–		

=== Other charting songs ===
Year	Single	Peak positions	Album
Year	Single	FR	Album
2013	"Ti amo t'es à moi" (feat. Amel Bent)	94	P.D.R.G. (Pouvoir, Danger, Respect & Game) (Saison 1 & 2)
2013	"Determiné"	96	P.D.R.G. (Pouvoir, Danger, Respect & Game) (Saison 1 & 2)
2013	"Zlatana"	109	P.D.R.G. (Pouvoir, Danger, Respect & Game) (Saison 1 & 2)
2013	"Futurs nouveaux amis"	192	P.D.R.G. (Pouvoir, Danger, Respect & Game) (Saison 1 & 2)
2013	"Maudit"	197	P.D.R.G. (Pouvoir, Danger, Respect & Game) (Saison 1 & 2)
2013	"P.D.R.G."	198	P.D.R.G. (Pouvoir, Danger, Respect & Game) (Saison 1 & 2)
2014	"L'oseille"	194	P.D.R.G. (Pouvoir, Danger, Respect & Game) (Saison 1 & 2)
2015	"La crème de la crème" (feat. Lacrim)	77	Rohff Game
2015	"Bijou" (feat. Awa Imani)	181	Rohff Game
2017	"J'te donne même pas l'heure"	73	
2018	"Persona non grata" (feat. Niro)	65	Surnaturel
2018	"La force"	83	Surnaturel
2018	"Testament II"	95	Surnaturel
2018	"Fille bien"	113	Surnaturel
2018	"J'arrache tout"	120	Surnaturel
2018	"#SNTL"	127	Surnaturel
2018	"#Rohffback"	131	Surnaturel
2018	"Aime moi à l'imparfait"	137	Surnaturel
2018	"J'ai passé l'âge"	138	Surnaturel
2018	"Cadeaux de l'éternel"	183	Surnaturel
2020	"Sécurisé" (feat. Dadju)	40	Grand Monsieur

=== Featured in ===
Year	Single	Peak positions			Certification	Album
Year	Single	FR	BEL Wa Ultratop	BEL Wa Ultratip	Certification	Album
2002	"Get Down Samedi Soir" (DJ Abdel feat. Rohff & Oliver Cheatham)	42	–	–		
2007	"Dirty Hous" (feat Big Ali)	–	–	–		
2008	"Pimp Ma Life" (TLF feat. Rohff)	37	–	–		
2012	"4 étoiles" (Sultan feat. Rohff)	45	–	32		
2019	"C'est la guerre" (Naps feat. Rohff)	120	–	–		Naps album On est fait pour ça
2020	"Générations" (YL feat. Rohff)	176	–	–		YL album Compte de faits

== Appearances ==
1996
Le T.I.N & Weedy Feat Rohff - Pour 100 balles t'as plus rien on T.I.N & Weedy, Guet-Apens
Le T.I.N & Weedy Feat Rohff & La Sexion - L'ultime combat on T.I.N & Weedy, Guet-Apens
Ideal J Feat Rohff, Yezi L'escroc, Manu Key & Rim-K - Show Bizness on EP of Ideal J, Original Mc's sur une mission

1997
Rohff Feat Le T.I.N & La Sexion - La vie est une chienne on Nord Vs Sud
Rohff Feat Ideal J, Stor-K, OGB, Sayd des Mureaux & 113 - Dans ta race on L'invincible armada

1998
113 Feat Rohff & OGB - Les évadés on EP of 113, Ni barreaux ni barrières ni frontières
113 Clan (Rohff, Ideal J, Karlito, 113 & Manu Key) - Trainer la nuit on Opération freestyle
Manu Key Feat Rohff - Triomphe Part I on Manu Key
Ideal J Feat Rohff & Demon One - L'amour on Ideal J, Le combat continue
Rohff Feat Mystik, Pit Baccardi & Neg'Marrons - On fait les choses on Première classe Vol.1

1999
Pit Baccardi Feat Rohff & Kery James - K'1 freestyle on Pit Baccardi
3ème Œil Feat Rohff & Menzo - Comoria on 3e Œil, Hier aujourd'hui demain
D.Abuz System Feat Rohff, Oxmo Puccino & Princess Aniès - La loi du plus fort on D.Abuz System, Le syndikat
Boogotop Feat Rohff & 113 - Ennemis on Boogotop, L'antidote

2000
Le Rat Luciano Feat Sat & Rohff - Nous contre eux onRat Luciano, Mode De Vie - Béton Style
Intouchable Feat Rohff & Boss One - A l'ancienne on Intouchable, Les points sur les i
Kertra Feat Rohff & 113 - Le labyrinthe on Kertra, Le labyrinthe
Rohff - Que des cadeaux on Bâtiment B : la dernière chance
Rohff Feat Nino Scroface - La rage de vaincre on Ghett' Out Vol.1

2001
Rohff - Rohff thriller on Cut Killer Show 2
Rohff - Deuxième génération on Hexagone 2001
Rohff Feat 113 - Imagine sur la compile Sur un air positif
Rohff Feat Booba & Rim'K - Cru (Morceau qui devait figurer sur l'album La Vie avant la mort)
Manu Key Feat Rohff - Triomphe 2000 sur l'album de Manu Key, Manuscrit
Kery James Feat Mafia K'1 Fry - C'qui nous perd sur l'album de Kery James, Si c'était à refaire
Rohff Feat Lino - L'œil du tigre sur la compile Première classe Vol.2
113 Feat Rohff - Le chant du vice sur la compile Double Face Vol.3
Rohff Feat 113 - Vitry club sur la compile Vitry club
Rohff Feat Pit Baccardi & Disiz - Rap de barbares sur la compile Mission Suicide
Akhenaton Feat Rohff, Lino & Pit Baccardi - AKH version H sur le maxi d'Akh, AKH Version H
Weedy & Le T.I.N Feat Rohff & Baicefa - Fight club sur l'album de Weedy & Le T.I.N, Guet-Apens 2

2002
Alibi Montana Feat Rohff, Philo & G'Kill - Impact des mots sur la compile Mandat de dépôt
Sat Feat Rohff & Le Rat Luciano - Nous contre eux 2 sur l'album de Sat, Dans mon monde
Rohff Feat Oliver Cheatham - Get down samedi soir sur la compile A l'ancienne II

2003
Rohff - A bout portant sur la compile Fat taf
Rohff Feat Pharrell Williams - Wheres yours at sur la B.O. du film Taxi 3
113 Feat Rohff & Karlito - Assoce de... sur l'album du 113, Dans l'urgence
Rohff Feat Tandem, Zesau, Sefyu & Dry - Baiser sur la compile Talents fâchés 1
Mafia K'1 Fry - Sang pour sang sur la compile Talents Fachés
Doudou Masta Feat Mafia K'1 Fry - 94400 sur l'album de Doudou Masta, Mastamorphose

2004
Alibi Montana Feat Rohff - Pourquoi tu parles de moi sur l'album d'Alibi, 1260 jours
Kery James Feat Rohff & Soprano - La force sur la compile Savoir & vivre ensemble
Rohff Feat Dry - Tous mortels sur la compile Batiment B : Hommage...
Rohff Feat Mohamed Lamine & Cheba Maria - Mon bled sur la compile Rai'NB Fever
Rohff Feat Intouchable & Kamelancien - La hass sur la compile Street lourd hall stars
Rohff Feat Kamelancien - A quoi ça sert sur la compile Street lourd hall stars
Rohff - En mode 1 sur la compile Street lourd hall stars
Rohff - En mode 2 sur la compile Street lourd hall stars
Rohff Feat Intouchable & Marques Houston - Warriorz sur la B.O. du film Banlieue 13
Rohff Feat Tandem - Tu fais pas le poids sur la compile Talents fâchés 2

2005
Alibi Montana Feat Rohff - A l'ancienne Remix sur l'album d'Alibi, Numéro D'écrou
Kool Shen Feat Rohff & Dadoo - L'avenir est à nous sur le maxi de Kool Shen, L'avenir est à nous
Rohff Feat Cheb Hamza - On est de taille
Rohff Feat The Game - Top of the world sur la compile The basement
Rohff - Paranoiac sur la compile Rap performance
Rohff Feat Kamelancien - T'1kiet sur la compile Rap performance
Rohff Feat Sefyu - L'intelligence du gun sur la compile Rap performance

2006
Rohff - C'est comme ça sur la compile Talents fâchés 3
Rohff - C'est comme ça sur la mixtape Mixtape evolution
TLF Feat Rohff - Principes sur le Street CD de TLF, Ghetto Drame Vol.1
TLF Feat Rohff & Alibi Montana - Le Mc qui valait trois mollards sur le Street CD de TLF, Ghetto drame Vol.1
Rohff - Résurrection sur la B.O. du jeu Scarface
Admiral T Feat Rohff - Number 1 sur l'album d'Admiral T, Toucher l'horizon

2007
Rohff Feat Big Ali - Dirty Hous sur la réédition de Au dela de mes limites
Mafia K'1 Fry Feat Rohff - Gère sur la réédition de l'album de la Mafia K'1 Fry, Jusqu'à la mort
Mafia K'1 Fry Feat Rohff - Tout est possible sur la réédition de l'album de la Mafia K'1 Fry, Jusqu'à la mort
TLF Feat Rohff - Pimp my life sur l'album de TLF, Rêves de rue
TLF Feat Rohff - On sait qui sur l'album de TLF, Rêves de rue
TLF Feat Rohff - Baise tout Remix sur l'album de TLF, Rêves de rue

2008
Need127 Feat Rohff - Roh2frères sur l'album de Need127
Rohff - Pas de héros sur la B.O. du film Mesrine
Rohff - Classique

2009
Rohff Feat Humphrey - "Dans la minute"
Rohff - "La hagra du rap français" sur la compile "Talents Fâchés 4"
Rohff - " Entre Deux" sur la compile "Street Lourds 2"
Rohff - La Grande Classe (live), Sévère (live), Dirty Hous' (live) et Medley (La puissance, Le son qui tue et en mode) on the compilation Urban Peace 2 Live
Casus Belli Feat Rohff - Quoi Qu'ils Disent sur l'album de Casus Belli, Cas de guerre
Kamelancien Feat Rohff & China - Juste un bol d'air sur la compilation De 0 à 30°(en 24h)

2010
Rohff - Salamalikoum sur la compilation Street Lourd Hall Stars II
Amy et Bushy Feat. Rohff - 4 Vérités sur l'album d'Amy & Bushy, 1 Life
Amy et Bushy Feat. Rohff - Attends sur l'album d'Amy & Bushy, 1 Life.
La Fouine Feat. Rohff - Passe leur le salam, sur l'album de La Fouine, La Fouine vs. Laouni

2011
Naj Feat. Rohff - Keep your eyes on this
Dj Abdel feat. Rohff & Lois Andrea - Number One, sur l'album de DJ Abdel, Evolution
Six Coups MC feat. Rohff - J'vais T'faire Une Bosse (Remix)sur l'album de Six Coups MC Folie Artistik

2012
TLF Feat. Rohff - C'est la mif sur l'album de TLF, OVNI
TLF Feat. Rohff - Foolek Empire sur l'album de TLF, OVNI
TLF Feat. Rohff - Street Célébration sur l'album de TLF, OVNI
Sultan Feat. Rohff - 4 étoiles sur l'album de Sultan, Des jours meilleurs
