= 113 (band) =

French hip-hop band

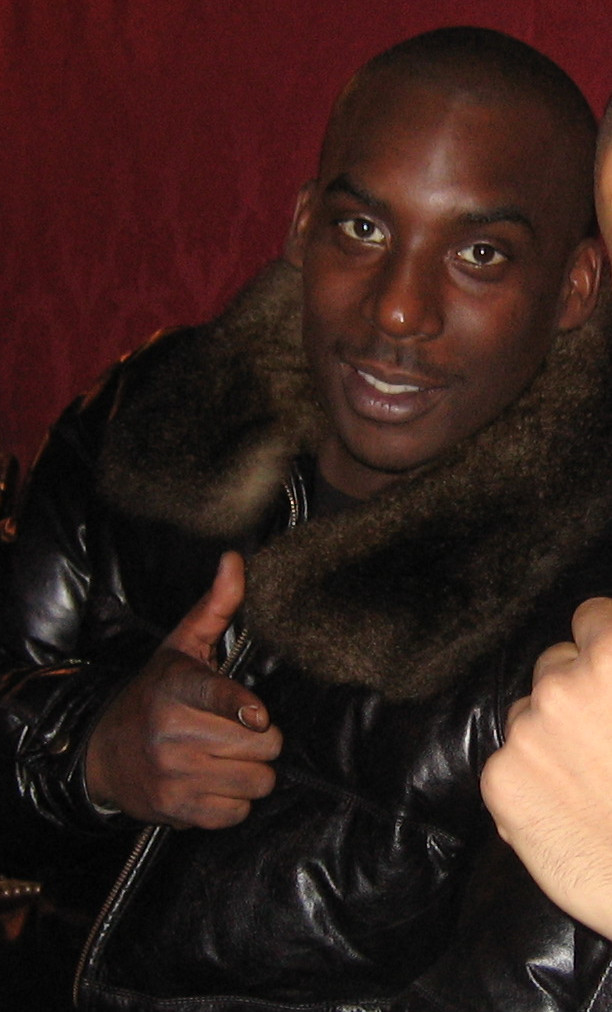
- From left to right: AP, Mokobé, and Rim'K

Background information
- Origin: Vitry-sur-Seine, Paris, France
- Genre: French hip-hop
- Years active: 1994–2011 (inactive)
- Label: Sony Music
- Members: AP; Mokobé; Rim'K
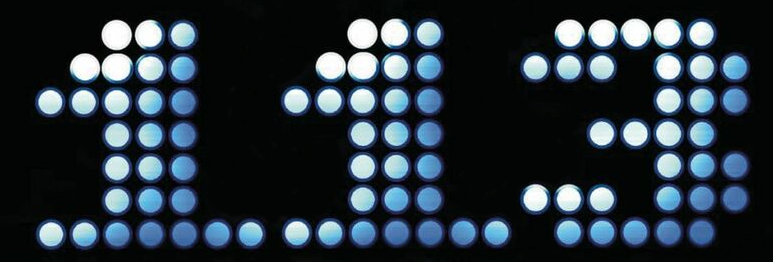

113 (French pronunciation: [sɑ̃ tʁɛz]) is a French hip-hop group formed in 1994 in Vitry-sur-Seine by rappers AP, Mokobé, and Rim'K. They are known for including African and Caribbean roots originating in north and west Africa and the island of Guadeloupe into their music. The group's name comes from the name of the building in a housing estate where the members spent much of their youth.

In 1998, the group released Ni barreaux, ni barrières, ni frontières, their debut EP, which included the track "Truc de fou", featuring Doudou Masta, and the song "Associations de malfaiteurs", a collaboration with Kery James, which brought 113 to prominence. The EP was followed by their debut studio album, Les Princes de la ville, in October 1999. Thanks to the album and the song "Tonton du bled", the group won two awards at Victoires de la Musique in March 2000 for "Rap, Reggae, or Groove Album of the Year" and "New Artist of the Year". That same year, they released their second album, 113 fout la merde; it was less successful than Les Princes de la ville, and thus the album was reissued a year later titled 113 dans l'urgence, with the six tracks from the original album replaced by seven new ones, including the song "10 minutes chrono", which is from the soundtrack of the movie Taxi 3.

In 2005, 113 released their third album, 113 degrés, before taking a five-year break; they returned in late 2010 with their fourth album, Universel. Since 2011, 113 has been inactive, although Rim'K, AP, and Mokobé have continued their own musical careers, and only Rim'K and AP have collaborated on tracks together.

== Members ==
- AP (born 9 April 1978 in Créteil, Île-de-France) is French with Guadeloupean ancestry.
- Mokobé (born 24 May 1976 in Vitry-sur-Seine) is French with Malian, Mauritanian & Senegalese ancestry.
- Rim'K (born 21 June 1978 in Paris) is French with Algerian ancestry.

== Discography ==
=== Albums ===
==== Studio albums ====
| Year | Album | Peak positions | | | Certifications |
| Year | Album | FR | BEL (Wa) | SUI | Certifications |
|---|---|---|---|---|---|
| 1999 | Les Princes de la ville | 5 | – | – | SNEP: FR: Platinum |
| 2000 | 113 fout la merde | 7 | 32 | 70 | SNEP: FR: Gold |
| 2003 | 113 dans l'urgence | 10 | – | – | SNEP: FR: Gold |
| 2005 | 113 degrés | 5 | 49 | 81 | SNEP: FR: Gold |
| 2010 | Universel | 26 | – | – | SNEP: FR: Gold |

==== Albums with Mafia K'1 Fry ====
- 2003: La Cerise sur le ghetto
- 2007: Jusqu'à la mort

==== Individual albums by 113 collective members ====
AP

- 2005: Zone Caraïbes (compilation co-produced by AP)
- 2009: Discret

Mokobé

- 2007: Mon Afrique
- 2011: Africa forever

Rim'K

- 2004: L'enfant du pays
- 2007: Famille nombreuse
- 2009: Maghreb United
- 2012: Chef de famille
- 2016: Monster Tape

=== EPs ===
- 1998: Ni barreaux, ni barrières, ni frontières

=== Mixtapes ===
| Year | Album | Peak positions | Certification |
| Year | Album | FR | Certification |
|---|---|---|---|
| 2006 | Illégal Radio | 26 | |

=== Singles ===
| Year | Single | Peak positions | | | | Certifications | Album |
| Year | Single | FR | BEL (Wa) | NED | SUI | Certifications | Album |
|---|---|---|---|---|---|---|---|
| 2000 | "Tonton du bled" | 5 | 14 | – | – | | Les Princes de la ville |
| 2000 | "Jackpotes 2000" | 37 | 40 | – | – | | Les Princes de la ville |
| 2000 | "Les princes de la ville" | 95 | – | – | – | | Les Princes de la ville |
| 2003 | "Au summum" | 8 | 18 | – | 52 | | Dans l'urgence |
| 2004 | "Un gaou à Oran" (with Magic System & Mohamed Lamine) | 9 | 3 | 65 | 20 | | |
| 2006 | "Un jour de paix" (feat. Black Renégat) | 17 | – | – | – | | 113 degrés |
| 2006 | "Partir loin" (feat. Reda Taliani) | 23 | – | – | – | | 113 degrés |
