= Despo Rutti =

French rapper from Democratic Republic of the Congo

Pascal Trésor Azusimba better known as Despo Rutti (born 26 June 1982, in Kinshasa) is a Congolese rapper active in France.

== Life and Career ==
Spending his life in Kinshasa and in Brazzaville, he immigrated to France in 1992. He released his first recordings in 1999 "Tout c’que j'n'aurais pas" and "Les reufs meurent" and was featured in a number of rap compilations through producer Fabrice Yahiaoui and label Hématome Concept eventually signing with label Soldat Sans Grade Records releasing Les sirènes du charbon on 28 November 2006, as a double CD, being an EP of 9 titles and a street album mixed by DJ Boudj. It denounced the social inequalities and a protest for expulsion of immigrants. It was followed by another provocative release, Convictions suicidaires, his debut studio full album treating taboo subjects of French society including national identity in face of changing immigration trends. This was followed by the mixtape Discographie parallèle mixed by DJ Uka and highlighting a number of collaborations.

He prepared the materials for his second studio album Les funérailles des tabous in 2012, but put it on hold instead starting a collaboration with rapper Guizmo and Mokless (from Scred Connexion) for a musical project in 2012, that resulted in the issue of the joint EP Jamais 2 sans 3 followed by the joint studio album Jamais 203. The three acts are touring France in promotion of the releases.

== Discography ==
=== Albums, EPs and Mixtapes ===
Year	Title	Peak positions	Notes
Year	Title	FRA	Notes
2006	Les sirènes du charbon	–	Double CD, an EP (9 tracks) and a street album mixed by DJ Boudj (15 tracks)
2010	Convictions suicidaires	14	First studio album (14 tracks)
2010	Discographie parallèle	–	Mixtape mixed by DJ Uka (37 tracks)
2016	Majster	99	Second studio album (22 tracks)

=== Joint Albums and EPs as trio Guizmo, Despo Rutti & Mokless ===
Year	Title	Peak positions	Notes
Year	Title	FRA	Notes
2013	Jamais 2 sans 3	–	EP in preparation for the album (8 tracks) and a street album mixed by DJ Boudj (15 tracks)
2013	Jamais 203	102	Studio album (17 tracks)
