= Kamelanc' =

French-Moroccan rapper

Kamelanc' (Kamelancien)
- Also known as: Mister "Tchik et brah" L'Ancien; Lanc'
- Born: Kamel Jdayni Houari; May 13, 1980 (age 46); Le Kremlin-Bicêtre, France
- Genres: French hip hop
- Occupations: Rapper, songwriter
- Years active: 1993 – present

Kamel Jdayni Houari (born 13 May 1980 in Le Kremlin-Bicêtre), better known as Kamelancien later shortened into Kamelanc', is a Francophone rapper of Moroccan origin. He grew up in Le Kremlin-Bicêtre, a town in the suburbs of Paris.

== Discography ==
=== Albums ===
as Kamelancien

| Year | Album | Peak positions | |
| Year | Album | FR | BEL (Wa) |
|---|---|---|---|
| 2007 | Le charme en personne | 30 | — |
| 2008 | Le frisson de la vérité | 14 | 58 |
| 2009 | Le 2ème frisson de la vérité | 50 | — |
| 2015 | Le cœur ne ment pas | 76 | — |

as Kamelanc'

| Year | Album | Peak positions | |
| Year | Album | FR | BEL (Wa) |
|---|---|---|---|
| 2013 | Coupé du monde | | |

=== Mixtapes ===
as Kamelancien

| Year | Album | Peak positions |
| Year | Album | FR |
|---|---|---|
| 2006 | Ghettographie | 159 |
| 2009 | Ghettographie II | — |

=== Singles ===
as Kamelanc'

| Year | Single | Peak positions | Album |
| Year | Single | FR | Album |
|---|---|---|---|
| 2013 | "Sans toi" (feat. Sarah Riani) | 149 | |

featured in

| Year | Single | Peak positions | Album |
| Year | Single | FR | Album |
|---|---|---|---|
| 2011 | "Vécu" (La Fouine feat. Kamelancien) | 51 | |

== See also ==
- North African communities of Paris
