= My Girl (Amine song) =

Single by Amine

from the album Au delà des rêves
- Released: June 2006
- Genre: R&B
- Label: EMI
- Songwriters: Leslie Bourgouin; Djamel Fezari; Pascal Koeu; Amine

Amine singles chronology
"J'voulais" (2006)	"My Girl" (2006)	"Sobri 2" (2006)

"My Girl" is the third single from French R&B singer Amine's album, Au delà des rêves. The song peaked at No. 29 in France.

== Track listing ==
CD single

1. "My Girl" (radio Edit)
2. "My Girl" (version Arabe)
3. "Win" (feat Ness Beal)
