= Mohamed Lamine =

Mohamed Lamine may refer to:

- Muhammad VIII al-Amin (1881–1962), the last bey of Tunisia (1943 to 1956)
- Mohamed Lamine (singer), Algerian raï singer contributing to the Raï'n'B album series
- Mohamed Lamine Chakhari (born 1957), Tunisian politician and minister
- Mohamed Lamine Debaghine (1917-2003), Algerian politician and independence activist
- Mohamed Lamine Ould Ahmed (born 1946), Sahrawi politician and a member of the Polisario Front
- Mohamed Lamine Sanha (died 2007), Bissau-Guinean Naval Chief of Staff
- Mohamed Lamine Sissoko (born 1985), French-born Malian football player
- Mohamed Lamine Traoré (also known as Mamadou Lamine Traoré) (1947–2007), Malian politician
- Mohamed Lamine Zemmamouche (born 1985), Algerian football player
- Mohammed Lamine, Ghanaian footballer
