= Raï'n'B Fever =

- Cover of Raï'n'B Fever's first album by Kore & Skalp

Background information
- Origin: France, Algeria
- Genres: Raï'n'B, Raï, RnB, Hip hop
- Years active: 2004–2011
- Labels: Columbia Records

Raï'n'B Fever is a collective of mainly Algerian Raï, R&B and rap/urban artists contributing their best output of the Raï'n'B genre of music with fusion of elements of both genres in a series of albums also called Raï'n'B Fever albums. The collective and the albums were the idea of the DJ duo Kore & Skalp as duo Kore & Skalp, who in a matter of years became the most known producers of the genre.

The initial album was released with great commercial success in 2004, followed by a number of follow-up albums produced by Kore and his brother DJ Bellek in 2006 and 2008, a special album 2009 (Même pas fatigué) and another by Kore in 2011.

== History ==
Même pas fatigué !!! cover.

In 2004, Kore and Skalp produced the compilation Raï'n'B Fever. The concept of the album is to mix raï with other musical styles such as rap, rnb or funk, thus bringing together artists from all walks of life such as Rohff, Faudel, J-Mi Sissoko, Leslie, Amine, Willy Denzey, Relic, 113, Magic System, Kayliah, Mohamed Lamine, La Fouine, Cheb Bilal, Leïla Remi, Yaleil, Cheba Maria and Cheb Tarik. The project was released commercially on 21 June 2004, distributed by small/Sony Music, under the Artop label. Many different and varied themes are treated there such as uprooting, origins, love, faith, hope and the loss of loved ones. Represented by the singles "L'orphelin" by Willy Denzey and Kader Riwan, "Sobri" by Leslie and Amine, "Un gaou A Oran" by 113, Magic System and Mohamed Lamine and the fourth single "Just Married" performed by Relic and Amine, all titles benefited from very good media exposure. Due to its eclecticism, the album was certified gold at the end of the year by the SNEP and made it possible to put the singer Amine at the forefront of the media scene, as an initiator of the raï'n'b style. The compilation is a great success.

Kore, with the label Columbia Records and Sony Music Entertainment, published on 28 August 2006, the compilation Raï'n'B Fever 2, which featured many national and international artists, such as Amerie, Kelly Rowland, Willy Denzey, M. Pokora, Leslie, Amine, Cheb Mami, Diam's. The project will notably highlight Big Ali and Six Coups MC. Note that the title "Enta Omri", performed by Ricky Martin and Cheb Mami will not appear on the project. He brings in DJ Bellek, brother of Kore, replacing Skalp who left the producing duo.

In 2009, the collective of 35 artists, including Willy Denzey, LIM, 113 and Big Ali, performed at the Palais Omnisports de Paris-Bercy on Saturday 7 March 2009 in front of 12,000 spectators. In April 2011, an extract from the fourth opus of the collective's compilation series was published. In the meantime, two new singles "Baptized Loin" sung by Kenza Farah and Cheb Mami, and "Ecoutez Loin" were released. In July 2011, Sexion d'Assaut was announced for this fourth opus. The collective therefore did it again at the end of 2011 with the release of Raï'n'B Fever vol. 4.

== Discography ==
Year	Album	Producer	Track list
2004	Raï'n'B Fever	Kore & Skalp	1. "Intro – Bonjour la France" – (Omar & Fred); 2. "Un gaou à Oran" – (113 – Magic System, Mohamed Lamine); 3. "Sobri" – (Leslie – Amine); 4. "Mon bled" – (Rohff, Mohamed Lamine, Chebba Maria); 5. "Le génie" – (Amine, La Fouine); 6. "Retour aux sources" – (Rim'K, Khaled, Mohamed Lamine); 7. "Raï'n'b Fever" – (Faudel, Jérôme Pristel); 8. "Reggae Raï Fever" – (J-Mi Sissoko, Cheb Tarik); 9. "J'suis pas d'ici" – (OGB, Sahraoui); 10. "Just Married" – (Amine, Relic); 11. "Neya" – (Mohamed Lamine, Kayliah); 12. "Madame, Madame" – (Omar & Fred); 13. "Yeppa mama" – (Cheb Bilal, Leila Rami); 14. "Ma Leila" – (Shakeen, Yaleil); 15. "L'orphelin" – (Willy Denzey, Kader Riwan); 16. "Rimitti Ridim" – (Cheikha Rimitti); 17. "Outro – Chabani Nonda" – (Omar & Fred)
2006	Raï'n'B Fever 2	Kore & Bellek	1. "Intro – Hey madame" – (Omar & Fred, Mustapha); 2. "C cho ça brûle" – (Big Ali, Magic System, Bilal, Akil); 3. "200 degrés" – (Zahouania, Bilal, Nessbeal, Big Ali); 4. "Crunk didi" – (Amerie, Willy Denzey, Six Coups MC); 5. "Sobri 2" – (Amine, Leslie); 6. "Non c'sera non" – (Cheb Mami, Diam's); 7. "Africa Riddim" – (Amadou et Mariam, Taoues, Leslie); 8. "Ola Ola" – (Kamel Shadi, Sweety, LS ) 9. "D'où je viens" – (Idir, Rim'K, Sniper); 10. "Rainbfever.com" – (Amine, M. Pokora); 11. "Interlude" – (Dj Youcef); 12. "A moi la vie" – (Douzi, Justine, Six Coups MC, Big Ali); 13. "H'bibi I love you" – (Amine, Kelly Rowland); 14. "Cholé Cholé" – (Reda Taliani, Rappeur d'instinct); 15. "Reviens moi" – (Shareen, Cheb Bilal, Malika, Al Peco); 16. "Ibiza a Tamanrasset" – (Mustapha, Omar & Fred)
2008	Raï'n'B Fever 3	Kore & Bellek	1. "Bienvenue Chez les Bylkas" – (Sinik, Big Ali & Cheb Bilal); 2. "Ya Mama" – (Kenza Farah & Najim); 3. "Habibi" – (Leslie & Amar); 4. "Crois en tes rêves" – (Amel Bent & Mohamed Reda); 5. "Amitiés Sacrés" – (TLF & Zahouania); 6. "Te Quiero" – (Amine & Kayliah); 7. " Ca passe ou ça Kasse" – (Tunisiano, Reda Taliani); 8. "Jusqu'au bout du monde" – (Willy Denzey & Najim); 9. "Raï-Kaï" – (LIM, Reda Talliani & Samira); 10. "Origines" – (Melissa M & Amine); 11. "Cette soirée là" – (K-reen, Kamelancien & Cheb Hassen); 12. "C L'ambiance" – (L'Algérino & Sahraoui); 13. "Ya dellali" – (Cheb Billal & Shynèze); 14. "Emmène-moi" – (Akil & Leïla Rami); 15. "Il Suffira" – (Shaheen & Yalleil); 16. "Ya Denia" – (Chebba Maria, Cheb Amar & Aketo)
2009	Raï'n'B Fever 3 Même pas fatigué	Kore & Bellek	CD1: 1. "Bienvenue Chez les Bylkas" – (Sinik, Big Ali & Cheb Bilal); 2. "Ya Mama" – (Kenza Farah & Najim); 3. "Habibi" – (Leslie & Amar); 4. "Crois en tes rêves" – (Amel Bent & Mohamed Reda); 5. "Amitiés Sacrés" – (TLF & Zahouania); 6. "Te Quiero" – (Amine & Kayliah); 7. " Ca passe ou ça Kasse" – (Tunisiano Reda Taliani); 8. "Jusqu'au bout du monde" – (Willy Denzey & Najim); 9. "Raï-Kaï" – (LIM, Reda Talliani & Samira); 10. "Origines" – (Melissa M & Amine); 11. "Cette soirée là" – (K-reen, Kamelancien & Cheb Hassen); 12. "C L'ambiance" – (L'Algérino & Sahraoui); 13. "Ya dellali" – (Cheb Billal & Shynèze); 14. "Emmène-moi" – (Akil & Leïla Rami); 15. "Il Suffira" – (Shaheen & Yalleil); 16. "Ya Denia" – (Chebba Maria, Cheb Amar & Aketo); 17. "Kellem" – (Chebba bilal & Selma); CD2: 1. "Même pas fatigué !!!" – (Khaled & Magic System); 2. "Elle et moi" – (Mohamed Reda & Vitaa); 3. "Bienvenue Chez Les Bylkas Remix" – (Big Ali & Mohamed Allaoua & Sinik); 4. "Mais Il Faut Croire En Ses Rêves" – (Amel Bent); 5. "Amitiés Sacrés" (Version Thug) – (TLF & Zahouania); 6. "Même Pas Fatigué!!!" (remix club by DJ Jul'S) – (Khaled & Magic System); 7. "Bienvenue Chez Les Bylkas" (bonus)
2011	Raï'n'B Fever 4	Kore	1. "Sahbi" – (Kore & Sexion d'Assaut); 2. "Vas-y Molo" – (Kore & Magic System, Mohamed Allaoua & Shaggy); 3. "Heya" – (Khalass, Kore & Psy4 De La Rime); 4. "Je Veux Chanter" / "Interlude" – (Kore & Brulé); 5. "Zahwani-You" – (Kore, Lacrim, Mister You & Zahouani); 6. "Tu Mérites Mieux" – (Isleym, Kore, Le Rat Luciano & Najim); 7. "Gewatane Fever" – (GSX, Khalass, Kore & Seth Gueko); 8. "Ma Voie" – (Amar, Kore & TLF); 9. "T'as Pas Assez" – (18 K-Ra, Khalass, Kore & Pitbull); 10. "Alabina Beach" – (Amine, Kore, Kulture Shock); 11. "Loin" – (Cheb Mami, Kenza Farah & Kore); 12. "Nous On S'en fout" – (Amine, Kore, Logobi GT & Still Fresh); 13. "J'ai Décidé" – (Cheba Sousou, Kore, Meh); 14. "Allaoui Fever" – (Hanini, Kore & Sofiane); 15. "Vote Ou Rai" part 1 – (Balti, Kore, Lotfi Double Kanon & Mister You); 16. "Vote Ou Rai" part 2 – (Nabila, AM-1, Benks, Diden, Fromage, Harone, Kore & L'Abbé Mase)

== Music videos ==
- 2004 : "Un Gaou a Oran" – 113, Magic System and Mohamed Lamine
- 2004 : "L'orphelin" – Willy Denzey and Kader Riwan
- 2004 : "Sobri" – Leslie and Amine
- 2004 : "Just Married" – Relic and Amine
- 2006 : "C cho ça brule" – Big Ali, Magic System, Cheb Bilal and Cheb Akil)
- 2006 : "Sobri 2" – Leslie and Amine
- 2008 : "Bienvenue chez les bylkas" – Sinik, Big Ali and Cheb Bilal
- 2009 : "Méme pas fatigué" – Magic System and Khaled
- 2011 : "The Rai'n'b 4" – GSX and Cheb Khalass
- 2011 : "Alabina Beach" – (Amine, Kore, Kulture Shock)
