= Sobri 2 =

Single by Leslie

from the album L'amour en vol
- Language: French; Arabic
- English title: Sobri 2
- Released: 27 November 2006
- Recorded: 2006
- Genre: R&B, raï
- Length: 3:14
- Label: Sony BMG
- Songwriter(s): Leslie Bourgouin; Djamel Fezari; Pascal Koeu; Amine

Leslie singles chronology
"L'Envers de la Terre" (2006)	"Sobri 2" (2006)	"Accorde-moi" (2007)

"Sobri 2" is the second single from French R&B/pop singer-songwriter Leslie, taken from her third studio album L'amour en vol (2006). The song was produced by Kore (from Kore & Skalp) and Amine. The song was written by Leslie and Ahmed Hamadi. It was released on 27 November 2006, through Virgin Music, only released 7 days after the release of her third studio album. "Sobri 2" is an R&B/raï duet between Leslie and Amine, lyrically about the curious the young couple might have in the future.

== Track listing ==
All tracks are written by Leslie, Amine.

No.	Title	Length
1.	"Sobri 2 (feat. Amine)"	3:14
2.	"Leslie & Amine feat. Six Coups MC - Sobri 2 (Remix Club)" (Track 2 has an extra video clip.)	3:49
Total length:		7:03

== Charts ==
Chart (2006)	Peak position
Belgian Singles Chart (Wallonia)	30
French Singles Chart	12

== Credits ==
List of credits for this single.

- Arranged By – Aurélien Mazin
- Design – Crazybaby.fr
- Photography – SLAM / Slamphotography
- Producer – Kore & Bellek
- Recorded By [Vocals] – 20-Cent Audou, Georges Padey, Kore (3)
- Written-By – Ahmed Hamadi, Amine Mounder*, Kore (3), Leslie Bourgouin

== Notes ==
Extra notes on this single.

Vocals recorded at Studio Blaster and Studio EMC Records.

Mixed at Studio Blaster.

℗ 2006 Artop Records / EMC Records

© 2006 M6 Interactions / Artop Records, exclusively licensed to Virgin Music, a division of EMI Music France.
