= L'amour en vol =

Studio album by Leslie
- Released: 20 November 2006
- Recorded: 2005–06
- Studio: Matrix Studios, Studio Blaster, Studio EMC Records, Studio Master, Zone 4 Studios
- Genre: R&B; chanson; electronica; electro-pop
- Length: 58:45
- Language: French
- Label: M6 Interactions; EMC Records
- Producer: Kore & Skalp

Leslie chronology
Mes couleurs (2004)	L'amour en vol (2006)	À la recherche du bonheur (2010)

Singles from L'amour en vol
- 1. "L'envers de la terre" Released: 8 July 2006; 2. "Sobri 2" Released: 27 November 2006; 3. "Accorde-moi" Released: 23 April 2007

L'amour en vol (English: The Love in Flight) is the third studio album by French R&B/pop singer-songwriter Leslie Bourgoin, released on 20 November 2006 through EMC Records and Sony BMG. The album contains the singles, "L'envers de la terre", "Sobri 2", and "Accorde-moi" featuring Bobby Valentino. "L'amour en vol" debuted at number 50 on the French Albums Chart (SNEP). The album spent only 9 weeks on the chart, placing its last position at number 200. The album differs in terms of sound, with more electro-pop-induced beats rather than her previous R&B efforts, Je suis et je resterai and Mes couleurs.

== Background and composition ==
After the success of her second studio album, "Mes couleurs" (2004), Bourgoin decided to approach a different sound, after already establishing herself as an R&B star with her debut studio album, "Je suis et je resterai" (2002), and experimenting in raï music, mixing it with R&B, as seen with Mes couleurs. With re-occurring producers Kore & Skalp, this album contains a more "futuristic" sound, with electro-pop elements and using hints of R&B throughout the instrumentals of the album. Recording sessions took place in various studios, such as Matrix Studio (located in Londres), Studio EMC Records, and Studio Master.

== Track listing ==
All tracks are written by Leslie.

CD
No.	Title	Length
1.	"Je le ferai pour toi"	3:19
2.	"L'envers de la terre"	3:36
3.	"Capitales riches"	3:10
4.	"Accorde-moi (feat. Bobby Valentino)"	3:38
5.	"Un pas vers l'amour"	1:23
6.	"S'échapper"	2:49
7.	"Sobri 2 (feat. Amine)"	3:21
8.	"L'amour en vol"	3:33
9.	"Echanger nos vies"	4:08
10.	"Cherish"	4:18
11.	"Maman"	1:55
12.	"Vers le paradis"	3:43
13.	"Si le temps"	3:27
14.	"Je veux être"	3:39
15.	"Ce qu'il y a entre nous"	3:42
Total length:		58:45

== Charts ==
=== Weekly chart ===
Chart (2006–2007)	Peak position
French Albums (SNEP)	50

== Personnel ==
List of people who worked on the album/album cover.

- Engineer [Sound] – Thierry Chassang
- Executive-Producer [Co-] – Maleko (2) (tracks: 1, 9, 10 & 13 to 15), Nizard (tracks: 1, 9, 10 & 13 to 15)
- Hair – Fred Barat*
- Make-Up – Odile Subra
- Management – Bozda Ya Ent*
- Management [Bobby Valentino] – Courtney "Court Luv" Stewart*
- Management [Coordination] – Tim Ahmann
- Photography By – Slam/Slam Photography
- Producer – Georges & Kool, Thierry*
