= Accorde-moi =

2007 single by French singer Leslie

Single by Leslie featuring Bobby Valentino

from the album L'amour en vol
- Language: French; English
- English title: "Grant Me"
- Released: 23 April 2007
- Recorded: 2006
- Genre: R&B, Contemporary R&B
- Length: 3:36
- Label: M6 Interactions
- Songwriter(s): Leslie, Bobby Valentino, Kenny Smooth
- Producer(s): Kore & Skalp

Leslie featuring Bobby Valentino singles chronology
"Sobri 2" (2006)	"Accorde-moi" (2007)

"Accorde-moi" (English: Grant me) is the third single by French R&B/pop singer-songwriter Leslie, taken from her third studio album L'amour en vol (2006). The song was produced by Kore & Skalp. The single was written by Leslie, Bobby Valentino, and Kenny Smooth. It was released on 23 April 2007, through M6 Interactions and EMC Records. "Accorde-moi" is a R&B duet song between Bobby and Leslie, lyrically about a lover with a broken heart who wants to take someone back.

== Chart performance ==
"Accorde-moi" debuted at No. 11 on the French Singles Chart (SNEP), and lasted 18 weeks on the singles chart until its last position at number 88.

Weekly charts
Chart (2007)	Peak position
French Singles Chart	11

== Track features ==
The single "Accorde-moi" was featured on many music playlist stations, such as:

- Été 2007 (released 15 June 2007)
- NRJ Summer Hits Only (released 13 July 2007)
- M6 Hits (released 23 July 2007)
- Hit Machine Summer 2007 (released 3 August 2007)
