= Vivons pour demain =

Single by Leslie

from the album Mes couleurs
- Language: French; Arabic; Bangla
- English title: "Let's Live for Tomorrow"
- Released: 10 May 2005
- Recorded: 2004
- Genre: R&B, dance-pop
- Length: 3:46
- Label: M6 Interactions
- Songwriter(s): Leslie, Djamel Fezari, Pascal Koeu
- Producer(s): Kore & Skalp

Leslie singles chronology
"Et j'attends" (2004)	"Vivons pour demain" (2005)	"L'envers de la terre" (2006)

"Vivons pour demain" (English: Let's Live for Tomorrow) is the third single from French R&B/pop singer-songwriter Leslie's second studio album, Mes couleurs (2004). It was released on 10 May 2005, through M6 Interactions. The song was produced by Kore & Skalp, and lyrics were written by Leslie herself along with Kore & Skalp. "Vivons pour demain" is an R&B/dance-pop induced song, lyrically about living for tomorrow and what's to come in the future.

== Track listing ==
All tracks are written by Leslie herself and Kore & Skalp.

CD-Single
No.	Title	Length
1.	"Vivons pour demain (Radio Edit"	3:46
2.	"Nos colères"	4:12
Total length:		7:58

== Credits ==
List of production used for this single.

- Artwork – Arsenic (7)
- Engineer [Assistant] – Vincent Audou*
- Executive-Producer – Georges & Kool
- Hair – Mario (227)
- Lyrics By – Leslie Bourgouin
- Make-Up – Florent Pellet
- Mastered By – Jean-Pierre*
- Music By – Kore & Skalp, Leslie Bourgouin
- Photography By – Fred Meylan*
- Producer, Arranged By, Recorded By, Mixed By – Kore & Skalp

== Chart performance ==
"Vivons pour demain" debuted and peaked at No. 23 on the French Singles Charts (SNEP), and lasted on the charts for 19 weeks until its last position at No. 77. The single also saw success in Switzerland, debuting and peaking at No. 54 on the Swiss Singles Charts (Swiss HitParade), lasting 7 weeks on the chart until its last position at No. 80.

== Charts ==
Chart (2005)	Peak position
French Singles Chart	23
Swiss Singles Chart	54
