= Et j'attends =

Single by Leslie

from the album Mes couleurs
- Language: French
- English title: "And I Wait"
- Released: 12 September 2004
- Recorded: 2003
- Genre: Pop, R&B
- Length: 3:48
- Label: M6 Interactions
- Songwriter(s): Dimitri Jamois, Leslie
- Producer(s): Kore & Skalp

Leslie singles chronology
"Sobri (notre destin)" (2004)	"Et j'attends" (2004)	"Vivons pour demain" (2005)

"Et j'attends" (English: And I Wait) is the second single from French R&B/pop singer-songwriter Leslie's album, Mes couleurs (2004). The song was produced by Georges Padey & Hayet Hamdi The singer was written by Leslie herself and Maleko. It was released on 12 September 2004, through Sony BMG. "Et j'attends" is an R&B song. Lyrically, it is about a person who waits for someone to do the same, and sacrifice the same in a relationship.

== Track listing ==
All tracks are written by Leslie, Kore & Skalp, Maleko.

CD-Single
No.	Title	Length
1.	"Et j'attends"	3:48
2.	"Tous ces gens"	3:48
Total length:		7:36

== Chart performance ==
"Et j'attends" debuted at No. 14 on the French Singles Chart (SNEP) staying on the charts for 17 weeks total, 3 of those weeks which kept the song at a peak of No. 7 on the charts as well. The single also saw success in Belgium and Switzerland, with the single peaking at No. 15 on the Belgian Singles Chart (Ultratop) and lasting 17 weeks on the charts. On the Swiss Singles Chart (HitParade), the single peaked at No. 38 and lasted 18 weeks on the chart.

== Charts ==
Charts (2004–2005)	Peak position
Belgian Singles Chart	15
French Singles Chart	7
Swiss Singles Chart	38

== Credits ==
List of personnel used in the production of this single.

- Executive-Producer – Georges & Kool
- Mastered By – Jean-Pierre*
- Mastered By [Assistant] – Jean-Sébastien*
- Mixed By – Chris Chavenon
- Mixed By [Assistant] – Medimed*
- Other [Hair] – Raphaël
- Other [Make-Up] – Florent Pellet
- Photography By – Maxime Leduc (2)
- Photography By [Assistant] – Dominic Raîche*
- Recorded By – Kore & Skalp
