= J'voulais =

Single by Amine

from the album Au delà des rêves
- B-side: "J'voulais" (extended version)
- Released: January 2006
- Recorded: 2005
- Genre: R&B
- Length: 3:20
- Label: EMI
- Songwriters: Amine; Kore; Skalp
- Producer: Kore & Skalp

Amine singles chronology
"Ma vie" (2005)	"J'voulais" (2006)	"My Girl" (2006)

Audio sample
- Amine - "J'voulais": file; help

"J'voulais" is the second single from French R&B singer Amine's album, Au delà des rêves. It was released in January 2006. The song deals with a love relationship that came to its end because the girl was too possessive and jealous.

== Success ==
The song went straight to number-one on French Singles Chart on 21 January 2006, staying for four non consecutive weeks at the top. Then it dropped, totalling ten weeks in the top ten, 19 weeks in the top 50 and 28 weeks on the chart. It was certified Gold disc by the SNEP. In Belgium (Wallonia), it charted for 17 weeks on the Ultratop 40, from 25 February, peaking at number ten for four weeks. In Switzerland, the single had a moderate success reaching number 27 on 26 February and featured on the chart (top 100) for 15 weeks.

== Track listings ==
- CD single
1. "J'voulais" – 3:20
2. "J'voulais" (extended version) – 3:59
3. "J'voulais" (remix featuring Bigali) – 4:16
4. "J'voulais" (video) – 3:20
- CD maxi
1. "J'voulais" – 3:20
2. "J'voulais" (extended version) – 3:59
3. "J'voulais" (video) – 3:20
4. "Touche pas à mon vote" (video)

== Charts and sales ==
=== Weekly charts ===
Chart performance for "J'voulais"
Chart (2006)	Peak position
Belgium (Ultratop 50 Wallonia)	10
France (SNEP)	1
Switzerland (Schweizer Hitparade)	27

=== Year-end charts ===
Year-end chart performance for "J'voulais"
Chart (2006)	Position
France (Airplay Chart)	24
France (SNEP)	11
France (Digital Chart)	47
France (TV Airplay Chart)	5

== Certifications ==
Certifications for "J'voulais"
Country	Certification	Date	Sales certified	Physical sales	Digital downloads
France	Gold	18 May 2006	200,000	235,703	17,441 (digital download)
