= À la recherche du bonheur =

Studio album by Leslie
- Released: 6 September 2010
- Recorded: 2009–10
- Genre: R&B, dance-pop, pop
- Length: 53:56 (Standard edition); 57:16 (Bonus version)
- Label: Artop Records
- Producer: DJ Kore & DJ Bellek (Kore)

Leslie chronology
| L'amour en vol (2006) | À la recherche du bonheur (2010) | Les enfants de l'orage (2013) |

Singles from À la recherche du bonheur
- 1. "Tout sur mon père" Released: 25 January 2010; 2. "Never Never" Released: 28 June 2010; 3. "Hier encore" Released: 7 October 2010

À la recherche du bonheur is the fourth studio album by French pop-R&B singer-songwriter Leslie, released on September 6, 2010. It is Bourgoin's first and only album under the independent label, Artop Records. The album was produced by the duo Kore & Skalp, and it mixes electro and dance elements with Bourgoin's pre-established R&B sound. The album's lyrical content explores themes about love, happiness, and empowerment, as well as current social and political issues. It is Bourgoin's most personal album to date, drawing inspiration from her family, childhood, and experiences as a young Paris newcomer.

== Track listing ==
| No. | Title | Writer(s) | Producer(s) | Length |
|---|---|---|---|---|
| 1. | "À la recherche du bonheur" | Leslie Bourgouin, Aurélien Mazin, Djamel Fezari | Kore | 1:49 |
| 2. | "Tout sur mon père" | Bourgouin, Mazin, D. Fezari | Kore | 3:08 |
| 3. | "Never Never" | Bourgouin, Mazin, D. Fezari, Mohamed Fezari | Kore | 3:27 |
| 4. | "Superwoman" | Bourgouin, Mazin, D. Fezari, M. Fezari, Sarah Sebaï | Kore | 3:24 |
| 5. | "West Side Story" | Bourgouin, Mazin, D. Fezari | Kore | 3:34 |
| 6. | "Au clair de la rue" | Bourgouin, Mazin, D. Fezari | Kore | 3:39 |
| 7. | "Hexagone" (featuring Mac Tyer, Seth Gueko & Kyzkill) | Bourgouin, Mazin, D. Fezari, Socrate Petnga, Nicolas Salvadori, Kyzkill | Kore | 3:19 |
| 8. | "Elle s'en ira" | Bourgouin, Mazin, D. Fezari | Kore | 3:32 |
| 9. | "Garde un œil Ouvert" | Bourgouin, Sebaï | Kore | 3:38 |
| 10. | "Dis-moi" | Bourgouin, Mazin, D. Fezari | Kore | 3:54 |
| 11. | "Authentik" | Bourgouin, Mazin, D. Fezari | Kore | 2:56 |
| 12. | "Politicien" | Bourgouin, Mazin, D. Fezari | Kore | 3:16 |
| 13. | "Paris je t'aime" | Bourgouin, Mazin, D. Fezari | Kore | 3:20 |
| 14. | "Hier encore" | Bourgouin, Mazin, D. Fezari | Kore | 3:22 |
| 15. | "Je vous écris" | Bourgouin, Mazin, D. Fezari | Kore | 4:07 |
| 16. | "Ever Never" (featuring Kulture Shock) | Bourgouin, Mazin, D. Fezari, M. Fezari | Kore | 3:31 |
| Total length: | | | | 53:56 |

iTunes Store bonus track
| No. | Title | Writer(s) | Producer(s) | Length |
|---|---|---|---|---|
| 17. | "Never Never" (Loic B Remix) | Bourgouin, Mazin, D. Fezari, M. Fezari | Kore | 3:20 |
| Total length: | | | | 57:16 |

== Charts ==
| Chart (2010) | Peak position |
|---|---|
| French Albums Chart | 34 |
