= Ma vie (Amine song) =

Single by Amine

from the album Au delà des rêves
- Released: 2005
- Genre: R&B
- Length: 4:18
- Label: EMI
- Songwriters: Kore; Skalp; Leslie Bourgouin; Amine Mounder
- Producer: Kore & Skalp

Amine singles chronology
"Ma vie" (2005)	"J'voulais" (2006)

Audio sample
- Ma Vie (French Version): file; help

"Ma vie" is the first single by French R&B singer Amine, released in 2005 from his album Au delà des rêves.

== Track listing ==
CD single

1. "Ma vie" (French version) - Avant-première
2. "Ma vie" (French and Arabic version)
3. "Ma vie" (Arabic version)
4. "Ma vie" (Video)

== Charts ==
Chart performance for "Ma vie"
Chart (2005)	Peak position
Belgium (Ultratop 50 Wallonia)	2
France (SNEP)	15
Switzerland (Schweizer Hitparade)	79
