= Sobri (notre destin) =

"Sobri (Notre Destin)"

Single by Leslie

from the album Mes Couleurs
- Released: 2004
- Genre: R&B, raï
- Label: M6 Interactions
- Songwriter(s): Leslie Bourgouin; Amine Mounder; Kore & Skalp
- Producer(s): Georges Padey; Hayet Hamd

Leslie singles chronology
"Pardonner" (2003)	"Sobri (Notre Destin)" (2004)	"Et j'attends" (2004)

"Sobri (Notre Destin)" is the first single from French singer Leslie's album, Mes Couleurs. The song was produced by Kore & Skalp, who produce tracks in the Raï style of music. The single was a great success in France and Belgium (Wallonia) where it almost topped the chart. As of August 2014, il was the 76th best-selling single of the 21st century in France, with 342,000 units sold.

The song was covered by Amine in 2006 for his album Au delà des rêves, on which it features as 13th in a remix club version.

== Track listing ==
CD single

1. "Sobri (notre destin)" featuring Amine (radio edit) — 3:32
2. "Le Temps qui passe" — 3:31
3. "Sobri (notre destin)" featuring Amine (extended version) — 4:12

== Charts ==
=== Weekly charts ===
Chart (2004)	Peak position
Belgian (Wallonia) Singles Chart	2
French Singles Chart	2
Swiss SNEP Singles Chart	29

=== Year-end charts ===
Chart (2004)	Position
Belgian (Wallonia) Singles Chart	9
French Airplay Chart	12
French Club Chart	4
French TV Music Videos Chart	2
French Singles Chart	7
