= Raï'n'B =

Music genre

Raï'n'B is a musical genre that appeared in the 2000s in France, which mixes elements of Algerian raï and French contemporary R&B. It is also distinguished by beats inspired by house music and dance.

== History ==
In 2004, two compilations each mixing raï and contemporary R&B were published: Raï'n'B Fever by Kore & Skalp and Des 2 mots by DJ Kim and DJ Goldfingers. French singer Amine considers himself the godfather of the genre. He became known in 2005 through his song "Ma vie", which was ranked 15th in France. His songs "Sobri" (a duet with Leslie) and "J'voulais" also ranked well in the country.
