= Pardonner =

Single by Leslie

from the album Je suis et je resterai
- Language: French
- English title: "Forgive"
- Released: 17 August 2003
- Recorded: 2002
- Genre: R&B
- Length: 3:01
- Label: M6 Interactions, Sony Music
- Songwriter(s): Leslie Bourgouin, David Adet, Cutee B.
- Producer(s): Georges Padey, Martial "Kool" Louis

Leslie singles chronology
"On n'sait jamais" (2003)	"Pardonner" (2003)	"Sobri (notre destin)" (2004)

"Pardonner" (English: Forgive) is the fourth and last single from R&B/pop singer-songwriter Leslie's debut studio album, Je suis et je resterai (2002). It was released on 17 August 2003, through Sony BMG. The single was produced by Georges Padey, and Martial "Kool" Louis. The single was written by David Adet, Cutee B, and Leslie herself. "Pardonner" is an R&B song, lyrically filled with verses about forgiving a person from a previous relationship.

== Chart performance ==
The single lasted 20 weeks on the French Singles Chart (SNEP), one week on the Swiss Singles Chart (Swiss HitParade), and three weeks on the Belgian Singles Chart (Ultratrop).

Weekly charts
Chart (2003)	Peak position
French Singles Chart	18
Belgian Singles Chart (Wallonia)	27
Swiss Singles Chart	80

== Track listing ==
All tracks are written by David Adet, Leslie Bourgouin, and Cutee B.

Maxi-CD
No.	Title	Length
1.	"Pardonner (Radio Edit)"	3:01
2.	"Pardonner (Kore & Skalp Remix)"	4:16
3.	"Leslie feat. Magic System & Sweety - Pardonner (Remix Cutee O Style)"	5:02
Total length:		7:39
