= Les enfants de l'orage =

Studio album by Leslie
- Released: 4 February 2013
- Recorded: 2012–2013
- Studio: Studio Haxo, Paris, Studio Question de son
- Genre: French pop, R&B, pop-rock
- Language: French
- Label: Artpop Records, EMI Music France
- Producer: Kore

Leslie chronology
À la recherche du bonheur (2010)	Les enfants de l'orage (2013)

Singles from Les enfants de l'orage
- 1. "Des mots invincibles" Released: 4 June 2012; 2. "Ma génération" Released: 19 November 2012; 3. "Je te donne" Released: 4 February 2013

Les enfants de l'orage (English: Children of the Storm) is the fifth and final studio album by French pop-R&B singer-songwriter Leslie, released on 4 February 2013 through Artpop Records. The album contains the singles, "Des mots invincibles", "Je te donne" and "Ma génération". "Les enfants de l'orage" debuted only at No. 70 on the French Albums Chart (SNEP), and lasted on the charts for a total of 2 weeks.

== Track listing ==
All tracks are written by Leslie Bourgouin, Kore, Fred Stavio.

CD
No.	Title	Length
1.	"Des mots invincibles"	3:00
2.	"Ma génération"	2:51
3.	"Les enfants de l'orage"	3:24
4.	"Où Va Le Monde?"	3:17
5.	"En silence"	3:02
6.	"L'amour et les couleurs"	2:52
7.	"Tous le "moi""	3:20
8.	"Je me fous"	2:59
9.	"Over"	3:45
10.	"Pour la meilleur et le pire"	3:28
11.	"La promesse"	3:01
12.	"Je te donne"	3:19

== Personnel ==
List of personnel used in production of this album.

- Drums – Anthony Giordano (tracks: 1 to 11), Yann Macé (tracks: 12)
- Guitar – Franck Amseli (tracks: 1 to 11), Vincent Martinez (tracks: 12), Yann Pechin* (tracks: 1 to 11)
- Keyboards – Fred Savio (tracks: 1 to 11), Luc Leroy (tracks: 12)
- Lyrics By – Siméo (tracks: 1 to 11)
- Mastered By – Eric Chevet (tracks: 12), Mathieu Bameulle (tracks: 1 to 11)
- Mixed By – Vincent Audou* (tracks: 1 to 11), Fred Savio (tracks: 1 to 11), Yann Macé (tracks: 12)
- Photography By [Except Pages 3 & 4], Artwork – Dimitri Simon
- Photography By [Pages 3 & 4] – David Benchitrit
- Piano – Fred Savio (tracks: 1 to 11)
- Producer – Fred Savio (tracks: 1 to 11), Kore (3) (tracks: 1 to 11), Trak Invaders (tracks: 12)

== Chart performance ==
Weekly charts
Chart (2013)	Peak position
France (SNEP)	70
