= Le bon choix =

2002 song by French pop-R&B singer Leslie

Single by Leslie

from the album Je suis et je resterai
- Language: French
- English title: "The Good Choice"
- Released: 13 March 2002
- Recorded: 2001–2002
- Genre: French R&B
- Length: 3:05
- Label: M6 Interactions
- Songwriter: Leslie
- Producers: Georges Padey, Martial Kool Louis

Leslie singles chronology
"Le bon choix" (2002)	"Je suis et je resterai" (2002)

"Le bon choix" (English: The Good/Right Choice) is a song by French pop and R&B singer Leslie, released on 13 March 2002, as the debut single for her debut album, Je suis et je resterai (2002), through the label M6 Interactions. The song was written by Leslie herself and David Adet. The production of the song was overseen by Georges Padey and Martial "Kool" Louis. Lyrically, it delves into the emotional complexities of making the right decisions in relationships and personal growth. The lyrics convey a message of self-awareness and the importance of listening to one's intuition when faced with choices that impact one's well-being.

Upon release, the single achieved notable commercial success in France. The song debuted at number 55 on the French Singles Chart (SNEP) and peaked at number 11, maintaining a presence on the chart for 23 weeks. It sold approximately 200,000 copies in France, marking a significant achievement for a debut single. The success of "Le bon choix" played a pivotal role in establishing Leslie's presence in the French R&B scene and set the stage for her subsequent releases. Although the single's impact was primarily within France, it contributed to the broader recognition of French R&B music during the early 2000s.

The music video narrates a story of romantic indecision and self-realization. It begins with Leslie encountering a man who captures her interest, leading to a budding connection. As the video progresses, she is also seen interacting with another man, highlighting her internal conflict between the two. Ultimately, Leslie chooses to part ways with both, symbolizing her decision to prioritize self-awareness and personal growth over uncertain relationships. The video's visuals, set against urban backdrops, complement the song's themes of making the right choices in love and life.

== Background and composition ==
Before beginning work on her debut studio album Je suis et je resterai, Leslie gained early recognition by participating in the 2001 French talent show Graines de Star (translated as Stardust in English). Her performance on the show was a standout, ultimately earning her the top prize in the music category, which significantly boosted her visibility in the French music scene. This breakthrough moment caught the attention of several influential producers, including Maleko, Georges Padey, Cutee B, and David "Little D" Adet, all of whom were affiliated with EMC Records and M6 Interactions. Impressed by her talent and potential, they signed her and took part in producing her debut album, with some of them contributing to its lyrical content as well.

The recording sessions for the album were held in two professional settings—Studio EMC and Master Studio—where Leslie began crafting her signature sound. This marked the beginning of her professional career and laid the foundation for her rise in the French R&B and pop scene. The song is composed in D minor, with a tempo (BPM) of 115 beats per minute.

== Music video ==
A music video was accompanied with her single, "Le bon choix". It shows Leslie starting out by bumping into another guy, with whom she starts to talk to after falling for him, as well as with another guy, eventually ditching both towards the end of the music video.

== Charts ==
Chart (2002)	Peak position
French Singles Chart	11

== Track listing ==
All tracks are written by Leslie, David Adet.

CD Single
No.	Title	Length
1.	"Le bon choix (Cutee 8 Mix)"	3:05
2.	"Le bon choix (DJ Kore & Skalp Remix)"	3:43
Total length:		6:48

== Credits ==
- Arranged By, Producer – David Adet, G. Padey*, M.Kool. Louis*
- Backing Vocals – D.Adet*, Jo.C, R.Joseph*, T.Key*
- Design – ★ Bronx
- Executive-Producer – Georges & Kool
- Lyrics By – David Adet
- Mastered By – J.P*
- Mixed By – P. Christian Lieu*
- Music By – Leslie Bourgouin
- Photography By – Enzo Minardi
- Promotion – Câline Beauge*, Loïc Laurencot*, Vanessa Meyer
