= Je suis et je resterai (song) =

2002 single by Leslie

Single by Leslie

from the album Je suis et je resterai
- Language: French
- B-side: "Je suis et je resterai (Instrumental)"
- Released: 27 August 2002
- Studio: Studio EMC; Studio Master
- Genre: R&B
- Length: 3:23
- Label: M6 Interactions
- Producers: Georges Padey; Martial "Kool" Louis

Leslie singles chronology
| "Le bon choix" (2002) | "Je suis et je resterai" (2002) | "On n'sait jamais" (2003) |

"Je suis et je resterai" (English: "I am and I will remain") is the second single by French R&B/pop singer-songwriter Leslie, taken from her debut studio album Je suis et je resterai (2002). The song was written by David Adet and Sarah Sebaï, and produced by Georges Padey and Martial "Kool" Louis. It was released on 27 August 2002 through EMC Records and M6 Interactions. "Je suis et je resterai" is a French R&B song, lyrically about one's personal challenges and growth throughout life.

== Personnel ==
Credits adapted from the Je suis et je resterai liner notes.

- Songwriters / Lyricists: David Adet, Sarah Sebaï
- Lead Vocals: Leslie (Leslie Bourgouin)
- Producers & Arrangement: Georges Padey, Martial "Kool" Louis
- Programming / Arrangement Assistance: David "Little D." Adet (keyboard programming, arrangements)
- Guitar: David Marescaux
- Mix Engineer: Chris Chavenon
- Mastering Engineer: J.P. Lasource
- Photography: Enzo Minardi
- Design: Bronx
- Chorus Contributors: David Adet, Sarah Sebaï

== Charts ==
=== Weekly charts ===
Initial chart performance for Je suis et je resterai
| Chart (2002–2003) | Peak position |
|---|---|
| French Singles Chart (SNEP) | 13 |

=== Monthly charts ===
Monthly chart performance for Je suis et je resterai
| Chart (2002–2003) | Peak position |
|---|---|
| French Singles Chart (SNEP) | 18 |

=== Year-end charts ===
Year-end chart performance for Je suis et je resterai
| Chart (2002) | Peak position |
|---|---|
| French Singles Chart (SNEP) | 73 |

== Certifications and sales ==
Regional certifications
| Region | Certification | Certified units/sales |
|---|---|---|
| France (SNEP) | ----------- | 120,000 |
