= Intime =

Intime may refer to:

== Music ==
- Intime (Christophe album), first acoustic live album by Christophe 2014
- Intime (Maya Berović album), Bosnian-language pop album by Maya Berović 2020
- Intime, French-language DVD album by Lara Fabian 2002

== Business ==
- Intime, Chinese department store chain, part of Alibaba Group
- INtime, RMX operating system

== See also ==
- In Time (disambiguation)
