= Mes couleurs =

Studio album by Leslie
- Released: 11 May 2004
- Recorded: 2003–04
- Studio: Studio EMC Records
- Genre: French Pop, French R&B
- Length: 54:24
- Language: French; Arabic
- Label: M6 Interactions
- Producer: Kore & Skalp

Leslie chronology
Je suis et je resterai (2002)	Mes couleurs (2004)	L'amour en vol (2006)

Singles from Mes couleurs
- 1. "Sobri (notre destin)" Released: 11 May 2004; 2. "Et j'attends" Released: 12 September 2004; 3. "Vivons pour demain" Released: 10 May 2005

Mes couleurs (English: My Colors) is the second studio album by French R&B and pop singer Leslie, released on 11 May 2004, through EMC Records and M6 Interactions. Bourgoin co-wrote all fifteen tracks on the album, along with Amine and Kery James. Production was supervised by Georges Padey, Martial "Kool" Louis, along with DJ duo Kore & Skalp. Lyrically, the album is expressive and often introspective, painting a portrait of a young woman navigating the complexities of life, identity, and emotional growth. The albums' themes deal with identity, love, empowerment, and social consciousness.

Upon release, the album performed commercially well. Mes couleurs debuted at number 10 on the French Albums Chart (SNEP). The album spent 66 weeks on the albums chart. On October 13, 2005, exactly one year and five months after its release, the album was certified double gold by the SNEP. It remains Bourgoin's best-selling album to date, with sales over 250,000 copies in France, as of September 2010.

The album featured three singles; "Sobri (notre destin)", "Et j'attends", and "Vivons pour demain", which was included in the reissue of Mes couleurs in 2005. The lead single "Sobri (notre destin)", a duet with Amine, became one of her biggest hits, reaching the Top 5 in France and Belgium, and earning a gold certification by SNEP. It was praised for its catchy blend of R&B and North African influences, appealing to a wide audience. The second single "Et j'attends" maintained her momentum, charting within the Top 30 in France and showcasing her emotional range and lyrical maturity. The third and final single, "Vivons pour demain" reached its peak position at number 23 on the French Singles Chart, as well as entering the charts in Switzerland.

== Background and composition ==
In 2001, Leslie gained early recognition by participating in the 2001 French talent show Graines de Star (translated as Stardust in English). Her performance on the show was a standout, ultimately earning her the top prize in the music category, which significantly boosted her visibility in the French music scene. After this, she would be signed to EMC Records and release her debut studio album, "Je suis et je resterai" (2002). The album would spend 37 weeks on the charts, and received a gold certification for surpassing sales of 130,000 copies in France.

After her debut album had established her as a known R&B artist, she decided to make her second one slightly different, but still using a classic R&B sound her debut studio album had. Production was managed by DJ duo Kore & Skalp, while writing was managed by Leslie herself and Amine. Recording sessions took place at Studio EMC Records.

== Commercial performance ==
The album debuted at number 10 on the French Albums Chart and demonstrated remarkable longevity by remaining on the chart for 66 weeks, reflecting its enduring popularity among listeners. By October 2005, Mes couleurs had achieved double gold certification from the Syndicat National de l'Édition Phonographique (SNEP), signifying over 200,000 copies sold in France. This commercial success was bolstered by the album's hit singles, including "Sobri (notre destin)," which resonated with a broad audience and contributed to the album's widespread acclaim.

The fusion of contemporary R&B rhythms with introspective lyrics in Mes couleurs not only solidified Leslie's presence in the music industry but also underscored her ability to connect with a diverse fan base. The album's performance is a testament to Leslie's artistry and the compelling nature of her musical expression during this period.

== Track listing ==
All tracks are written by Leslie Bourgouin.

CD Listing (except where noted)
No.	Title	Length
1.	"Intro"	1:41
2.	"Sobri (notre destin) (feat. Amine)"	3:32
3.	"Et j'attends"	3:38
4.	"Nos colères"	4:13
5.	"Où tu veux aller (feat. Orishas)"	3:33
6.	"Le temps qui passe"	3:31
7.	"Égoïstes"	3:09
8.	"Tous ces gens"	3:48
9.	"Laissez-les respirer"	3:42
10.	"Sans toi"	3:33
11.	"Dice-dice"	4:01
12.	"J'accuse (feat. Kery James)"	4:14
13.	"Cher toi"	4:08
14.	"Évolution"	3:51
15.	"Vivons pour demain" (Track not on CD)	3:28
Total length:		54:24

== Personnel ==
- Artwork – Arsenic (7)
- Engineer [Master Assistant] – Jean-Sébastien*
- Engineer [Mix Assistant] – Medimed*
- Mastered By – Jean-Pierre*
- Mixed By – Chris Chavenon
- Other [Children's Drawings] – Aminata & Marianne
- Other [Hair] – Magali Fockeu
- Other [Make Up] – Florent Pellet
- Photography By – Thierry Aglossi, Yannick Leconte

== Charts and certifications ==
=== Weekly charts ===
Chart (2004)	Peak position
French Albums (SNEP)	10

=== Certifications ===
Region	Certification	Certified units/sales
France (SNEP)	2× Gold	250,000
