= Mohamed Lamine (singer) =

Mohamed Lamine محمد لمين
- Born: 4 December 1970 (age 55); Algiers, Algieria
- Genre: Raï
- Occupation: Singer
- Instrument: Vocals

Mohamed Lamine (Arabic: محمد لمين), born 4 December 1970, in Algiers, is an Algerian raï singer. At the age of 10, he formed a group to recite religious chants in a mosque in the mountain village in Algeria where he spent his childhood. In 1988, he began his musical career recording under the name Mohamed Amine, with the 7-track cassette album Hob El Aadra. He then achieved popular success in Algeria in 1989 with the album and title track "Sidi Taleb".

It was the album Raï'n'B Fever, produced by Kore & Skalp and released in 2004, where he appeared on three tracks, that brought him recognition beyond the borders of Algeria and the Arab world. These included the hits "Un Gaou à Oran" with the groups Magic System and 113, "Mon Bled" with rapper Rohff and Cheba Maria, and "Ntiya" as a duet with singer Kayliah.

Following this, Mohamed Lamine continued to collaborate on duets and other projects across a variety of genres, including the track "Loin du Rivage" on rapper Nessbeal's album La mélodie des briques in 2006. That same year, he and singer Latifa Raâfat released the album Twahhachtek Bezzaf. In 2007, Reda 6k invited Mohamed Lamine to sing with him on the track "Mamamiya," and then in 2009, Mohamed Lamine appeared on "African Tonik" alongside DJ Arafat, Mokobé, and Mory Kanté.

On 6 December 2020, Mohamed Lamine announced during an interview on the Algerian television channel Echorouk TV that he was retiring from performing and singing sentimental Raï music to dedicate himself fully to religious songs, following his pilgrimage to Mecca, "It's a personal matter. I'm 50 years old, and I prefer to choose a different musical style, one that's somewhat rare in Algeria," Mohamed Lamine told his fans.

== Discographie ==
- 1988: Hob El Aadra
- 1989: Sidi Taleb
- 1990: Mohamed Lamine, Sid Ahmed El Harrachi – Duo Cheb El-Harrachi & Med Lamine
- 1990: S'hab El-Ballone
- 1990: Walan Nedi
- 1992: Haramtili Nchouf Weldi
- 1992: Aayit Nkaber Fi Galbi with Cheb Nasro
- 1993: Bali Bali
- 1993: Mon 1er Pas
- 1997: Mohamed Lamine en live à Paris
- 2006: Khoudi Anouani
- 2006: Twahhachtek Bezzaf with Latifa Raâfat
- 2009: Mixtape Avant L'Album
- 2023: Wanna Wanna (Best Of)
