= L'Envers de la Terre =

2006 song by Leslie

"L'envers de la terre"

Single by Leslie

from the album L'amour en vol
- Language: French
- English title: "The Other Side of the Earth"
- Released: 8 July 2006
- Recorded: 2006
- Genre: Electropop, dance-pop, R&B
- Length: 3:35
- Label: M6 Interactions
- Producer(s): Pete Martin, Kool

Leslie singles chronology
"Vivons pour demain" (2005)	"L'envers de la terre" (2006)	"Sobri 2" (2006)

"L'envers de la terre" (English: The Other Side of the Earth) is the first single from French R&B/pop singer-songwriter Leslie's third album, L'amour en vol (2006). The song was produced by Pete Martin & Kool. The single was written by Leslie herself and Beegy. It was released on 8 July 2006, through M6 Interactions and Sony BMG. "L'envers de la terre" is an electro-pop and dance-pop song with a slight touch of R&B to it. Lyrically, the song tells of a person being hypnotized by another person, making them feel like they are on the "other side of the Earth" because of the person she sings about.

== Music video ==
A video for "L'envers de la terre" exists. The song’s accompanying video shows Leslie in a spaceship laying down in her bed, with scenes of her dancing in a black room with a disco ball and colorful lights with sparkly silhouettes of people and later accompanied by her friends who dance with her. Leslie then wakes up, realizing it was all a dream.

== Track listing ==
All tracks are written by Leslie.

CD-Single
No.	Title	Length
1.	"L'envers de la terre"	3:38
2.	"Tell Me (Supa Station)"	3:37
Total length:		7:15

== Charts ==
"L'envers de la terre" debuts at No. 16 on the French Singles Chart (SNEP). The single stays on the chart for 18 weeks until its last position was at number 96. The single also saw success in Switzerland, debuting & reaching its peak at number 65 on the Swiss Singles Chart (Swiss HitParade).

Chart (2006)	Peak position
French Singles Chart	16
Swiss Singles Chart	65
