= Corynne Charby =

French actress, pop singer and model (born 1960)

- Born: Corinne Charbit; 12 July 1960 (age 66)
- Origin: Paris, France
- Genres: Italo disco, euro disco, pop
- Occupations: model, singer, actress
- Years active: 1981–1987

Corynne Charby (born 12 July 1960) is a French actress, pop singer and model.

== Career ==
=== Modeling ===
Born Corinne Charbit in Paris, Charby grew up in France, and left school after the troisième (form 3). In the late 1970s, she began a successful career as a model. She appeared on the cover of major magazines such as Elle and Lui and participated in several runway shows for large fashion houses.

=== Cinema ===
In the early 80s, she began a brief career in cinema. Her first and probably best known role was in the 1981 film, La Chèvre, where she played the part of a young woman sought by Pierre Richard and Gérard Depardieu. In 1982, she appeared in Plus beau que moi tu meurs with Aldo Maccione, and then in Rebelote the following year. Finally, in 1984, she played a prostitute in Un Été d'enfer with Thierry Lhermitte. Her career as an actress effectively ended after this film, and she struggled to find another important role.

=== Music ===
In 1984, she began singing under the name of Corynne Charby. Her first 7-inch, "À cause de toi", was written by Didier Barbelivien. It was followed the same year by the track "Ma Génération", and a mini album of the same name composed of six songs. In 1985, Charby released her third single, "J't'oublie pas", which did not appear on any album.

These first productions passed almost unnoticed. Charby didn't really gain popularity until 1986 with her summer hit "Boule de flipper", a song composed by the French singer Christophe. This was followed by other hits such as "Pile ou face" in 1987, another song of hers that dominated the French SNEP Singles Chart (Top 50). Staples of French popular music, these two songs are now available on many compilations of 80s hits.

On 17 June 1987, Charby teamed up with Johnny Hallyday to perform "Elle était toute seule" on the variety television show Embarquement immédiat pour l'Irlande on FR3.

In 1987, Charby released her second album, titled Toi. The album featured the hits "Boule de flipper" and "Pile ou face", the "Pile ou face" B-side "Elle part (dans ses rêves)" and eight new songs, three of which would be released as singles: "Pas vu, pas pris", "Elle sortait tard le soir" and "Même". Of those three, only "Pas vu, pas plus" obtained relative success.

Subsequently, Charby's artistic career came to an end. She married the head of a record company, and decided to devote herself to her family. According to various rumours, she additionally worked as a writer for sitcoms and TV dramas.

Charby's musical career was recapitulated in a Greatest Hits compilation released in 2001. In addition to her most well known songs from the 1980s (in extended versions), the disc contains a megamix. A new compilation named Boule de flipper was released in 2003 by Sony Music Entertainment.

== Covers of her songs ==
In 2007, the French singer Leslie covered the song "Boule de flipper" on her album. This song was also briefly parodied in a sketch by the comedians Gad Elmaleh and Djamel Debbouze, part of which went: "Qui c'est qu'a mangé un bout du flipper? C'est pas cool!".

In addition, the actress Emmanuelle Béart performed an uptempo rendition of "Pile ou face" for the soundtrack of the 2002 film, 8 Femmes.

== Discography ==
=== Studio albums ===
- 1984: Ma Génération
- 1987: Toi

=== Compilation albums ===
- 2001: Greatest Hits
- 2003: Boule de flipper

=== Singles ===
With peak positions in French Singles Chart:

- 1984: "À cause de toi"
- 1984: "Ma Génération"
- 1985: "J't'oublie pas"
- 1986: "Boule de flipper" (#17 in France)
- 1987: "Pile ou face" (#5 in France, certified Silver)
- 1987: "Pas vu pas pris" (#39 in France)
- 1987: "Elle sortait tard le soir"
- 1987: "Même"

== Filmography ==
- 1981: La Chèvre
- 1982: Plus beau que moi, tu meurs
- 1983: Rebelote
- 1984: Un Été d'enfer
