= Pile ou face =

Single by Corynne Charby

from the album Toi
- B-side: "Elle part (dans ses rêves)"
- Released: 1987
- Genre: Pop
- Length: 3:58
- Label: Polydor
- Songwriter(s): Franck Yvy; Jean-Louis D'Onorio
- Producer(s): Franck Yvy; Jean-Louis D'Onorio

Corynne Charby singles chronology
"Boule de flipper" (1986)	"Pile ou face" (1987)	"Pas vu pas pris" (1987)

Music video
- "Pile ou face" (audio only) on YouTube

"Pile ou face" ([pil u fas], "heads or tails") is a song by French model, actress and singer Corynne Charby. She released it in 1987 as a single and on the album Toi.

The song debuted at number 47 in France during the week of 30 May 1987, climbing all the way to number five for one week in July.

== Composition ==
The song was written and produced by Franck Yvy and Jean-Louis D'Onorio.

== Track listing ==
7" single (Polydor 885 730-7)

1. "Pile ou face" (3:58)
2. "Elle part (dans ses rêves)" (3:55)

== Covers ==
Emmanuelle Béart sang this song in François Ozon's 2002 movie 8 Women.

== Charts ==
Chart (1987)	Peak position
France (SNEP)	5
