= Pas vu pas pris =

Single by Corynne Charby

from the album Toi
- B-side: "Quelques notes de musique"
- Released: 1987
- Genre: Pop
- Length: 3:40
- Label: Polydor
- Songwriter(s): Franck Yvy; Jean-Louis D'Onorio
- Producer(s): Franck Yvy; Jean-Louis D'Onorio

Corynne Charby singles chronology
"Pile ou face" (1987)	"Pas vu pas pris" (1987)	"Elle sortait tard le soir" (1987)

Music video
- "Pas vu pas pris" (audio only) on YouTube

"Pas vu pas pris" is a song by French model, actress and singer Corynne Charby from her 1987 album Toi. It was also released as a single.

The single debuted at number 50 in France for the week of 12 December 1987, peaking at number 39 six weeks later.

== Composition ==
The song was written and produced by Franck Yvy and Jean-Louis D'Onorio.

== Track listing ==
7" single (Polydor 887 156-7)

1. "Pas vu pas pris" (3:40)
2. "Quelques notes de musique" (3:30)

== Charts ==
Chart (1987–1988)	Peak position
France (SNEP)	39
