= Boule de flipper =

Single by Corynne Charby

from the album Toi
- B-side: "J'sais pas quoi dire"
- Released: 1986
- Genre: Pop
- Length: 3:50
- Label: Polydor
- Songwriters: Jean-Michel Bériat; Daniel Bevilacqua
- Producer: Franck Yvy

Corynne Charby singles chronology
"Boule de flipper" (1986)	"Pile ou face" (1987)

Music video
- "Boule de flipper" (FR3, 1986) on YouTube

"Boule de flipper" is a song by French model, actress and singer Corynne Charby. Written by Jean-Michel Bériat and Christophe and produced by Franck Yvy, it was initially released in 1986 as her debut single and later appeared on her album Toi issued in 1987.

== Critical reception ==
A review in Pan-European magazine Music & Media described "Boule de flipper" as being "a Nena-type of song, up-tempo, catchy and a chorus with an [sic] European feel".

== Chart performance ==
In France, "Boule de flipper" debuted at number 39 during the week of 20 September 1986, climbing to number 17 four weeks later, and remained on the chart (top 50) for 16 weeks.

== Track listings ==
- 7" single (Polydor 885 019-7)
1. "Boule de flipper" (3:50)
2. "J'sais pas quoi dire" (3:50)

== Cover versions ==
Leslie on her album Futur 80 (2007); her version was released as a promotional single

== Charts ==
Weekly chart performance for "Boule de flipper"
Chart (1986)	Peak position
Europe (European Hot 100)	62
France (SNEP)	17
