= In time (disambiguation) =

In Time is a 2011 American science fiction film.

In Time may also refer to:

== Music ==
- In Time (Engelbert Humperdinck album), 1972
- In Time (Mat Maneri album), 1994
- In Time: The Best of R.E.M. 1988–2003, a compilation album by the music group R.E.M.
- In Time (The Mavericks album), 2013
- "In Time", a 1968 song by Jefferson Airplane from the album Crown of Creation
- "In Time", a 1973 song by Sly and the Family Stone from the album Fresh
- "In Time", a song by FKA Twigs from the EP M3LL155X
- "In Time", a song by Kris Allen from the 2014 album Horizons
- "In Time", a song by Robbie Robb, on the soundtrack of 1989 film Bill & Ted's Excellent Adventure.
- "In Time", a song by Mark Collie from the album The Punisher: The Album

== Other uses ==
- IN time, referring to time in Indiana (IN is the postal abbreviation for the U.S. state of Indiana)
- In Times, a 2015 album by Norwegian extreme metal band Enslaved

== See also ==
- Intime (disambiguation)
- Punctuality
- Time (music)
