= Des mots invincibles =

Single by Leslie

from the album Les enfants de l'orage
- Released: June 4, 2012
- Recorded: 2012
- Genre: French pop, dance-pop, synthpop
- Length: 2:57
- Label: Play On
- Songwriter(s): Leslie Bourgouin, Aurélien Mazin, Siméo, Djamel Fezari
- Producer(s): Siméo, DJ Kore

Leslie singles chronology
"I Need You More" (2011)	"Des mots invincibles" (2012)

"Des mots invincibles" is a song by French pop-R&B singer-songwriter Leslie.

It was written by Bourgoin, Aurélien Mazin, and Siméo, with Siméo and DJ Kore handling the production. Play On released the song on June 4, 2012, as the first single from Bourgoin's fifth album, Les enfants de l'orage (2012).

== Track listings ==
- Digital download
1. "Des mots invincibles" – 2:57
- Digital remix single
1. "Des mots invincibles" (featuring Youssoupha) – 2:57

== Charts ==
Chart (2012)	Peak position
France (SNEP)	75
