= Wow (Zola song) =

"WOW"

Single by Zola
- Released: July 16, 2020
- Recorded: 2020
- Length: 2:20
- Songwriters: Kore; Aurélien Mazin; Aurélien N'Zuzi Zola; Nasser Mounder

Zola singles chronology
"Bro Bro" (2020)	"Wow" (2020)

"Wow" is a song by French rapper Zola released in 2020.

== Charts ==
Chart (2020)	Peak position
Belgium (Ultratop 50 Wallonia)	17
France (SNEP)	5
Switzerland (Schweizer Hitparade)	52
