= Christophe (singer) =

French musician (1945–2020)

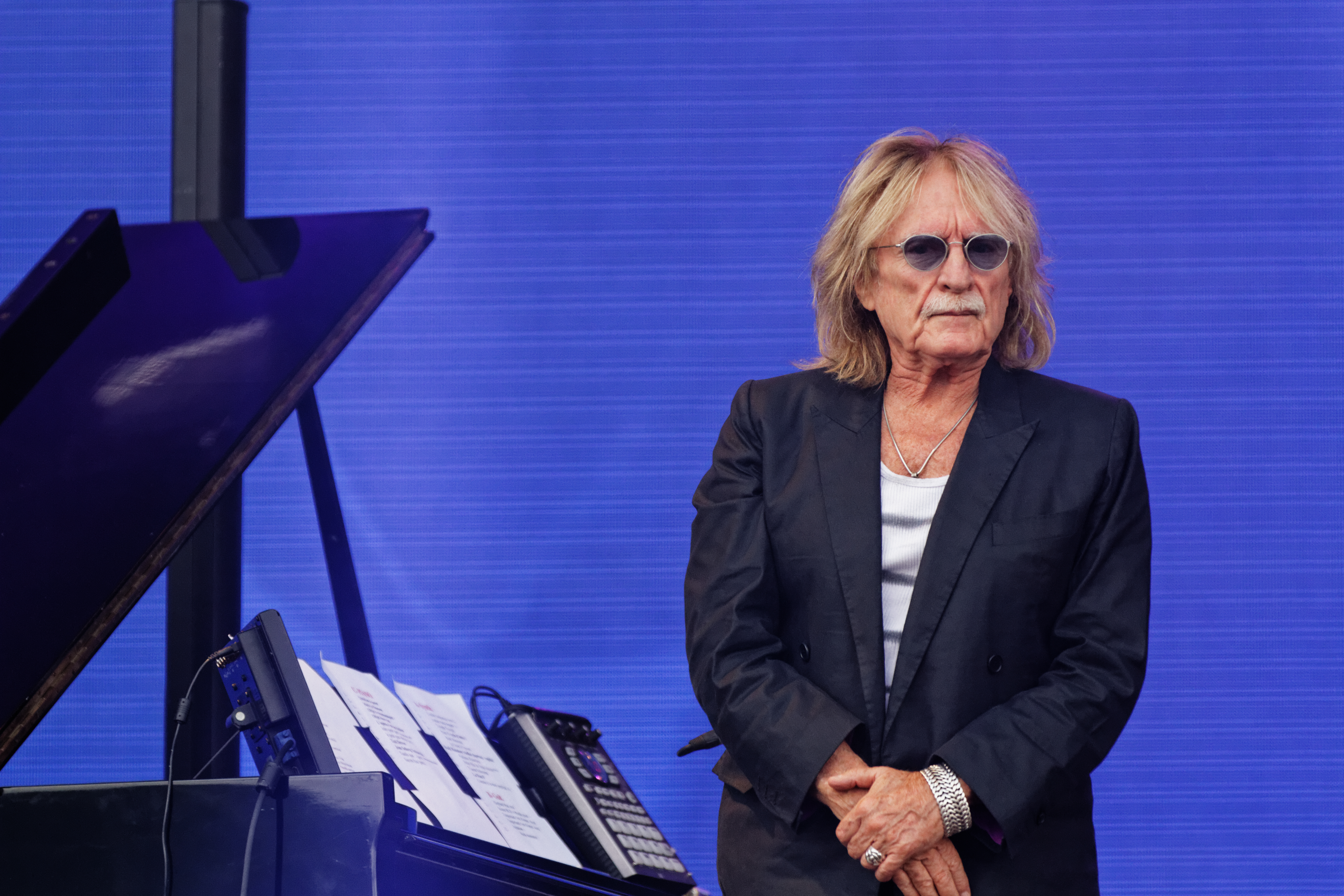
- Christophe during a concert at the Vieilles Charrues Festival in 2013

Background information
- Born: Daniel Bevilacqua; 13 October 1945; Juvisy-sur-Orge, Île-de-France, France
- Died: 16 April 2020 (aged 74) Brest, Brittany, France
- Genres: French pop; chanson
- Occupations: Singer-songwriter; musician
- Instruments: Vocals; keyboards; guitar
- Years active: 1963-2020
- Labels: Les Disques Motors; Epic; Mercury; Capitol Music France
- Website: difymusic.com/boutique-officielle-christophe

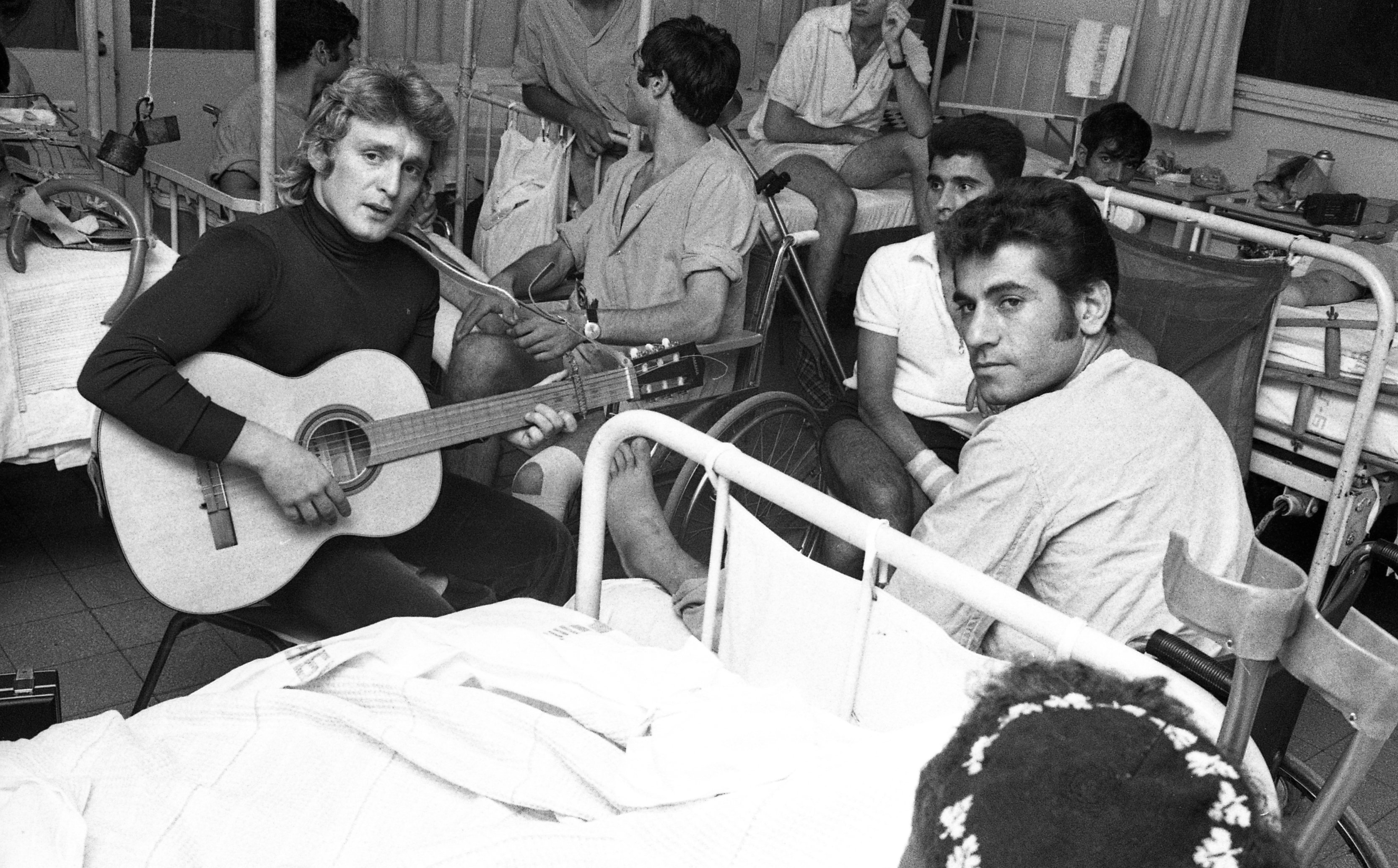
Christophe (furthest left) performing in Israel in 1969

Daniel Bevilacqua (French pronunciation: [danjɛl bevilakwa], Italian: [beviˈlakkwa]; 13 October 1945 – 16 April 2020), better known by the stage name Christophe (French: [kʁistɔf]), was a French singer and songwriter.

== Career ==
Born in the Paris suburb of Juvisy-sur-Orge to an Italian father, Bevilacqua was rebellious at school and started leading a pop group when in his mid-teens. His first single, "Reviens Sophie" (1963), was unsuccessful, but after changing his name to Christophe, his second single, "Aline" (1965), rose to the top of the French pop music charts.

He continued to have success in France through the 1960s and early 1970s. His hits include the songs "Marionettes", "J'ai entendu la mer", "Excusez-moi Monsieur le Professeur", and "Oh!... Mon Amour" which he sang in French and Italian. After a small break, he returned in 1971, with Francis Dreyfus launching the Motors record label (Disques Motors) and becoming the producer of Christophe records. The result was the 1973 album Les Paradis perdus. In 1974, he recorded "Les mots bleus", with lyrics by Jean-Michel Jarre.

In 1978, he came back with "Le Beau Bizarre". In 1983, Christophe released another single, "Succès fou", followed by "Clichés d'amour" in 1984 in which he sang 1940s and 1950s classics such as "Arrivederci Roma" and "Dernier baiser", a French version of the Mexican classic "Besame mucho". In 1985, he wrote "Ne raccroche pas" a song which is believed to be about the Princess Stephanie of Monaco. The following year, he wrote the song "Boule de flipper" for Corynne Charby.

In 1996, after a break, he returned with his album Bevilacqua. In 2001, he released another album Comm' si la terre penchait. In February 2002, Christophe performed, in Clermont-Ferrand, his first live concert in more than two decades, followed by two appearances at the Olympia in March 2002.

Christophe's 1970s song "Les mots bleus" was covered by Thierry Amiel in 2003. In 2011, Christophe took part in a tribute album for Alain Bashung two years after the latter's death. He sang "Alcaline", a song written by Bashung in 1989 for his album Novice.

In 2016, Christophe collaborated with Jean-Michel Jarre on the album "Electronica 2: The Heart of Noise" with the song "Walking The Mile". He also collaborated with Alan Vega on the album "Les Vestiges Du Chaos" with the song "Tangerine".

== Personal life and death ==
In 1971, Christophe married his girlfriend Véronique and fathered his daughter Lucie.

He died after being in critical condition due to COVID-19 associated with a previous comorbidity (COPD) on 16 April 2020.

== Discography ==
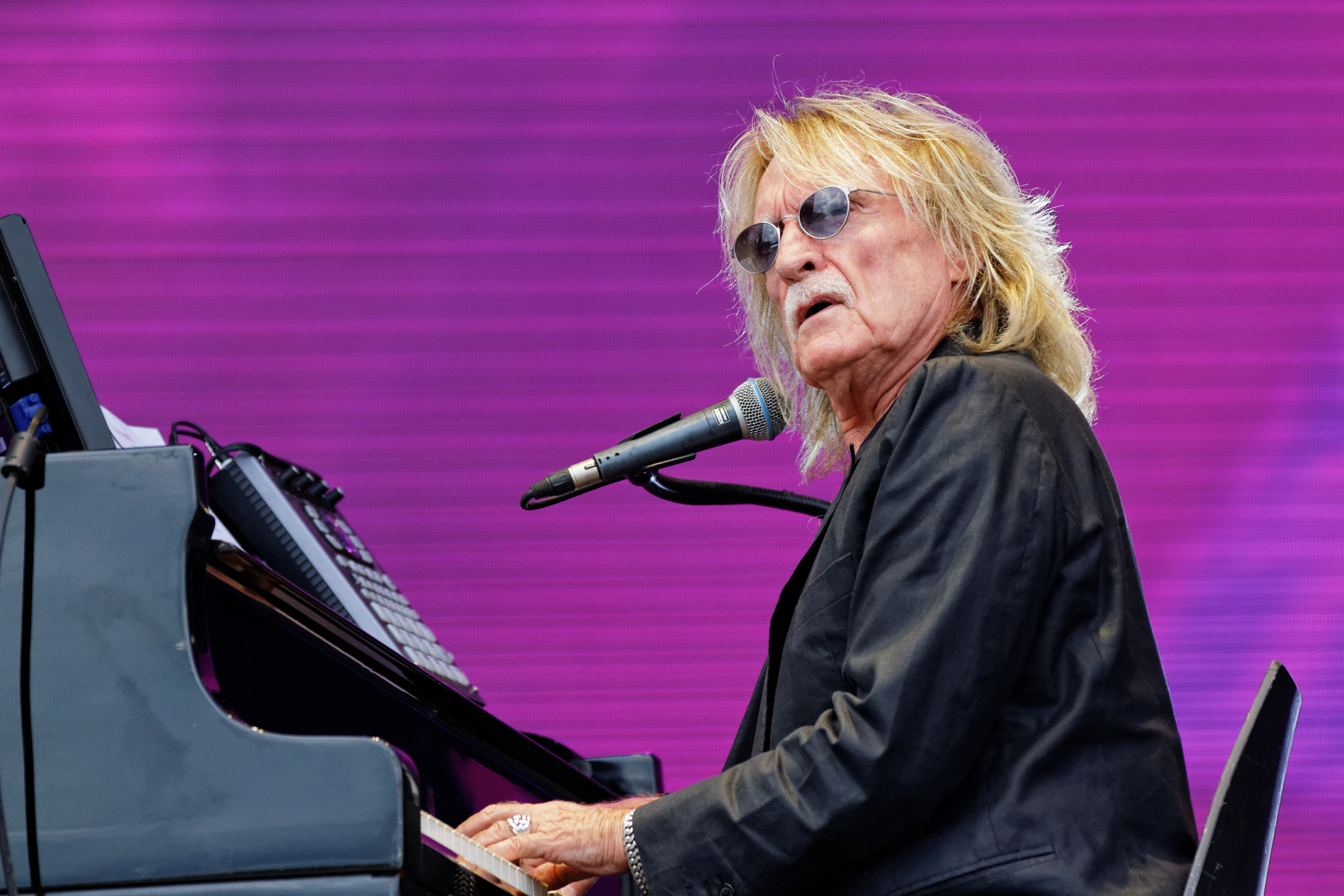
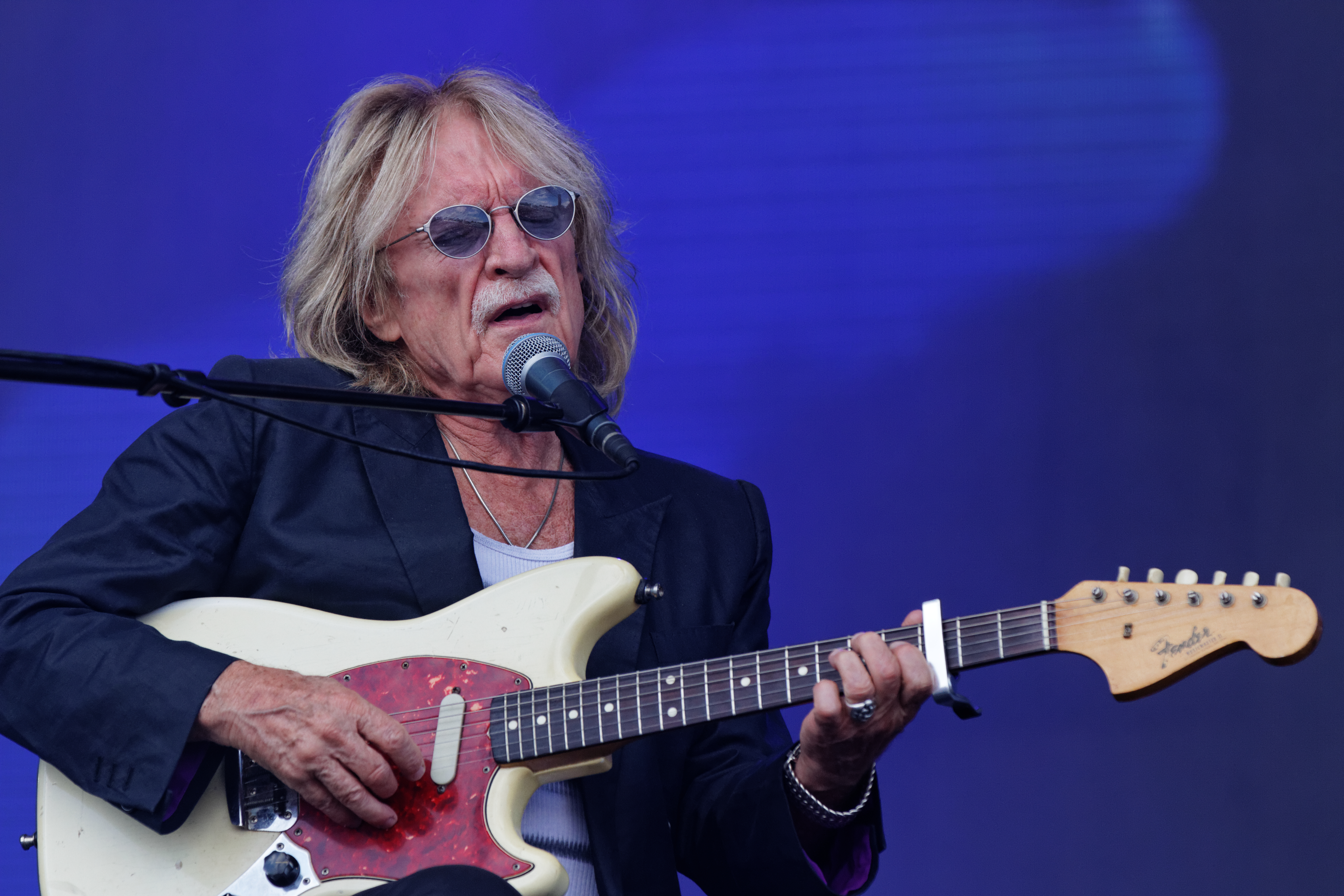
Christophe in 2014

=== Studio albums ===
- Christophe (1965, Disc'AZ)
- Sur la route de Salina (1970, Motors)
- Christophe (1972, Motors)
- Les paradis perdus (1973, Motors)
- Les mots bleus (1974, Motors)
- Samouraï (1976, Motors)
- La Dolce Vita (1977, Motors)
- Le Beau Bizarre (1978, Motors)
- Pas vu, pas pris (1980, Motors)
- Clichés d'amour (1983, Motors)
- Bevilacqua (1996, Epic)
- Comm'si la terre penchait (2001, Mercury)
- Aimer ce que nous sommes (2008, Az)
- Paradis retrouvé (2013, Motors)
- Les Vestiges du chaos (2016, Universal)

=== Live albums ===
- Olympia (1975, Motors)
- Olympia 2002 (2002, Mercury)
- Intime (2014, Motors) (either single CD or triple CD as deluxe ed.)

=== Compilations ===
- Mon Univers (1996, Motors) 1965-1988
- Best Of (2002, Dreyfus) 1965-1988
- Best Of (2006, Dreyfus) 1965-1988
- Christophe etc. (2019)
- Christophe etc. Vol. 2 (2019)
- Ultime. (2020)

=== Soundtracks ===
- La route de Salina (Motors)

=== Singles ===
- 1964: Reviens Sophie / Cette fureur de vivre / Ça n'fait rien / Se dire adieu
- 1965: Aline / Je l'ai retrouvée / Je ne t'aime plus / La fille aux yeux bleus
- 1965: Les Marionnettes / Je suis parti / Tu n'es plus comme avant / Noël
- 1966: Je chante pour un ami / Cette vie là / La danse a trois temps / J'ai remarché
- 1966: Excusez-moi monsieur le professeur / La camargue / Pour un oui / Christina
- 1966: J'ai entendu la mer / Cette musique / Le spectacle / Tu es folle
- 1966: À ceux qu'on aime / Avec des mots d'amour / Maman / Les amoureux qui passent
- 1967: Je sais que c'est l'été / Le coup de fouet / Les espagnols / La petite gamine
- 1968: Amour interdit / Passons une nuit blanche / Confession / Si tu veux, je peux

with Motors label

- 1970: The Girl From Salina / Sunny Road To Salina
- 1971: La petite fille du 3e / Mere, tu es la seule
- 1971: Mal / Épouvantail
- 1971: Mes passagères / Fait chaud ce soir
- 1972: Oh mon amour / Goodbye, je reviendrai
- 1972: Main dans la main / Nue comme la mer
- 1973: La vie c'est une histoire d'amour / Les jours où rien ne va
- 1973: Belle / Rock monsieur
- 1973: Les paradis perdus / Mama
- 1973: Mickey / Emporte-moi
- 1973: L'amour toujours l'amour / La bête
- 1974: Señorita / Le temps de vivre
- 1974: Les mots bleus / Le dernier des Bevilacqua
- 1975: Petite fille du soleil / Le petit gars
- 1976: Merci John d'être venu / Paumé
- 1976: Une autre vie / Paumé
- 1976: Daisy / Macadam
- 1977: La Dolce Vita / La mélodie
- 1978: Un peu menteur / Ce mec-lou
- 1979: Aline / Je ne t'aime plus
- 1980: L'Italie / Question ambiance
- 1980: Agitation / Les tabourets du bar
- 1983: Succès Fou / Cœur défiguré
- 1983: Mon amie la jalousie / Souvenir de Laura
- 1983: Dernier baiser / La nuit bleue'
- 1984: J'l'ai pas touchée / Voix sans issue
- 1985: Ne raccroche pas / Méchamment rock'n'roll
- 1988: Chiqué chiqué / Un tour d'Harley avec Lucy
- 1988: Chiqué chiqué (long version) / Besame mucho / Ne raccroche pas (long version)

== Filmography ==
- 1998: Autour de Vega, documentary by Hugues Peyret - as himself with Alan Vega
- 2006: Quand j'étais chanteur by Xavier Giannoli - as himself with Gérard Depardieu
- 2011: Preciosa short film by Dominique Abel - as Christophe
- 2013: Déjeuner chez Gertrude Stein, short by Isabelle Prim
- 2014: Juke-Box9 short by Ilan Klipper - as Daniel Berton
- 2014: Le Quepa sur la vilni! film by Yann Le Quellec - as mayor of Noère
