= Intime (Christophe album) =

Studio album by Christophe
- Released: 31 March 2014
- Recorded: 16 December 2013
- Genre: Chanson française, piano
- Length: 55m 15s
- Label: Capitol Music France

Christophe chronology
Les Vestiges du chaos (2013)	Intime (2014)	Paradis retrouvé, Volume 1 (2018)

Intime is a live album by Christophe from 2014. His third live album, it was the first to reinterpret some of his greatest hits including 1965's hits "Aline and "Les Marionnettes", and 1974's "Señorita", in acoustic versions.

== Track list ==
CD 1

1. Comme un interdit
2. Les Mots bleus
3. J'l'ai pas touchée
4. Aline
5. Les Paradis perdus
6. Les Marionnettes
7. Parle-lui de moi
8. La Non-demande en mariage
9. La dolce vita
10. Señorita
11. Emporte-moi
12. Petite fille du soleil
13. Alcaline
14. Lita
15. Interlude: Mon ami Alain (hommage à Alain Bashung)
16. Alcaline
17. Lita

CD 2 (additional EP disc on some versions of the album)

1. Elle dit
2. La Petite Fille du troisième
3. La Man
4. Ces petits luxes
5. Comm' si la terre tremblait
