= Cheba Maria =

Moroccan singer

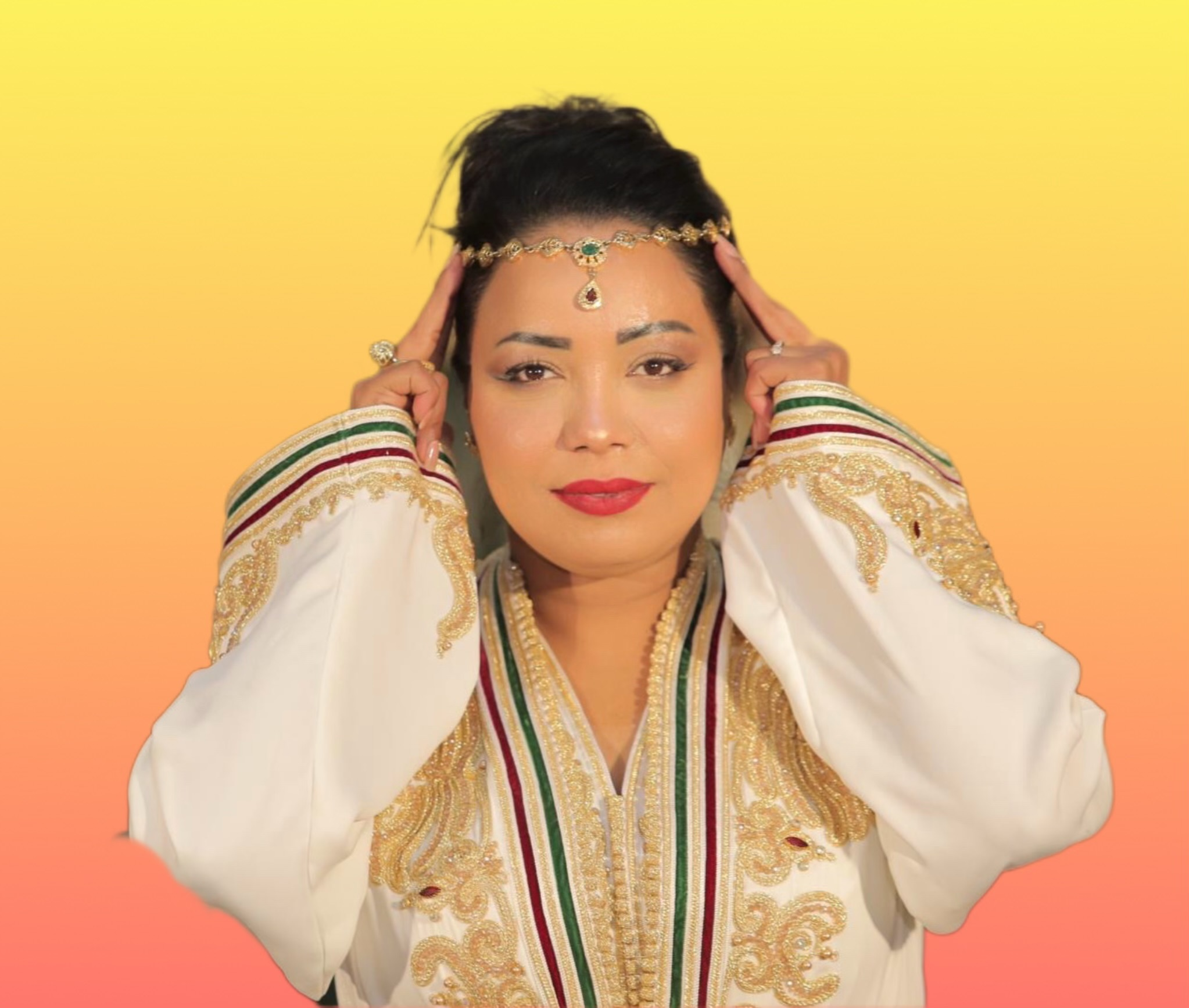
Cheba Maria

Khadija Zine, commonly known as Cheba Maria, is a Moroccan singer and songwriter of Raï music. Born in Casablanca, she is based in Toulouse, France.

Cheba Maria grew up in a culturally rich environment, immersed in traditional Moroccan music and Algerian Rai. From a young age, she developed a passion for music and began singing at local events.

In the 2000s, ‘’Cheba Maria’’ moved to France to pursue her musical career. She quickly gained recognition for her unique style, blending traditional Rai with modern sounds such as pop and Raïn’B.

She collaborated with several renowned artists. Her songs allowed her to win over a large audience, particularly in Europe and North Africa.

‘‘Cheba Maria’’ became a popular female figures in Rai music through her voice and stage presence. She participated in numerous festivals and cultural events, representing Maghreb music.

Alongside her musical career, ‘’Cheba Maria’’ remains attached to her Moroccan roots and continues to promote her country’s culture and music. Her journey inspires many young artists from the Maghreb diaspora.

== Discography ==
- 1998: Her duet with Cheb Rachid, "Enta Ould Bladi" ( Out of my country ) sold several thousand copies across multiple countries.
- 1999: " Amalek Zine" ( What is it? ) .
- 2000: " Zinek Khater " ( Your beauty is irresistible ) .
- 2001: " Rani Mghamra " ( First part of the adventure ) .
- 2003: "Jenentinie" (You make me crazy) and her participation in the album "Fever Raï'n'B", The "Mon Bled" duet with Mohamed Lamine and Rohff sold more than 250.000 copies, this give more opportunities to Cheba in her career.
- 2005: " My Love"
- 2008: " Ould Bladi "
- 2012: " Atlas Lions"
- 2013: "Princess Sara " with "Psy 4 Rime" from the album "4D"
- In Production (2025)
