= Zola (rapper) =

French rapper

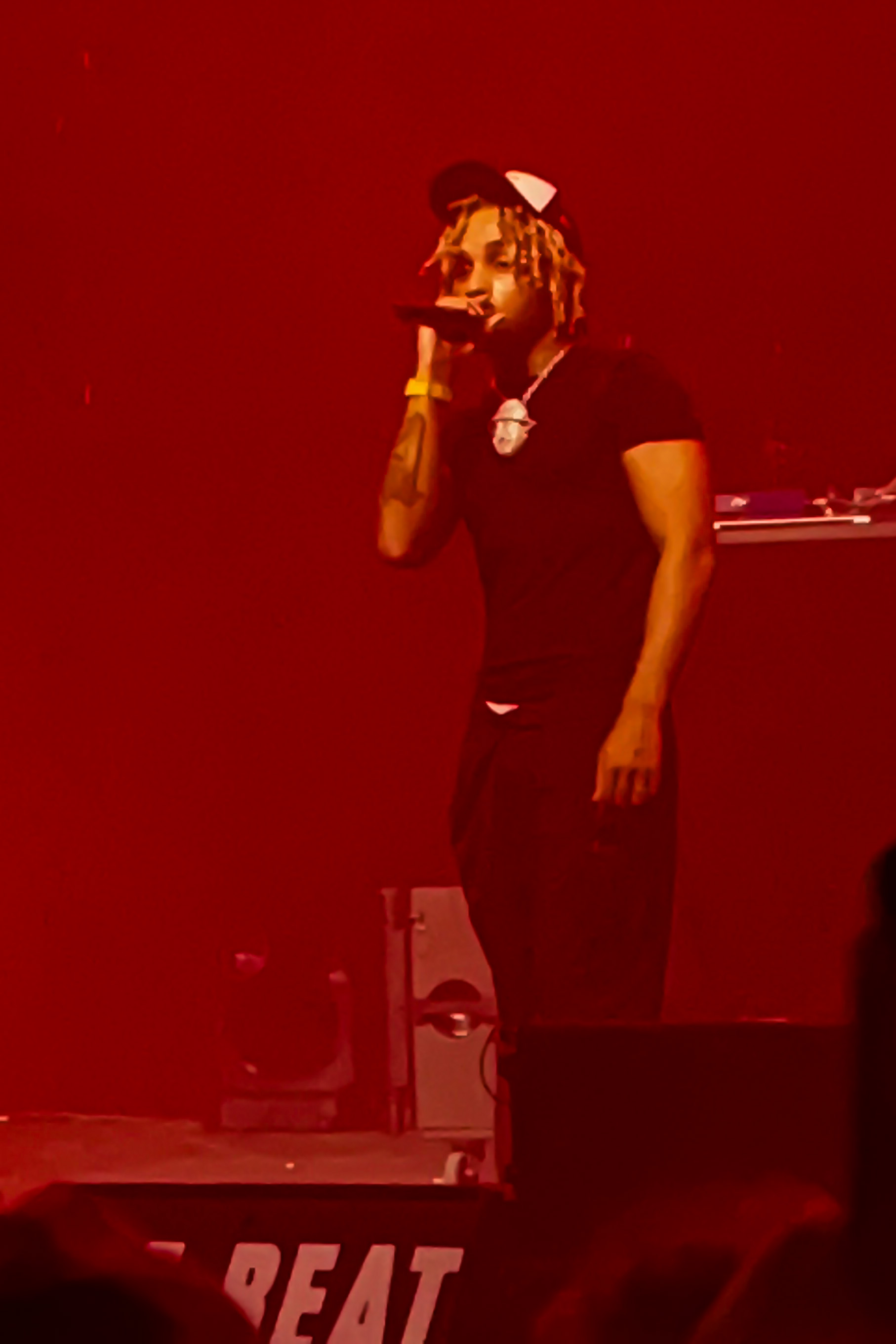
- Zola perform on Beat Festival in 2022

Background information
- Also known as: Zolaski
- Born: Aurélien N'Zuzi Zola; 16 November 1999 (age 26); Évry, Essonne, France
- Origin: Congolese
- Genres: French rap, trap
- Occupation: Rapper
- Instrument: Voice
- Years active: 2016-present
- Labels: Truth Records, AWA
- Website: https://binkszolashop.com/

Aurélien N'Zuzi Zola (born November 16, 1999, in Évry, Essonne), better known by the mononym Zola, is a French rapper of Congolese descent. Cicatrices, his debut album was released in 2019. His song "California Girls" was featured in the soundtrack of the film Taxi 5. He released his second album Survie in 2020 for which he sold 24,000 records in 7 days.

== Discography ==
=== Albums ===
Title	Year	Peak positions			
Title	Year	FRA	BEL (Fl)	BEL (Wa)	SWI
Cicatrices	2019	4	65	3	6
Survie	2020	1	35	3	13
Diamant du Bled	2023	1	63	2	2
Frères ennemis (with Koba LaD)	2024	1	—	2	3

=== Singles ===
Title	Year	Peak positions				Album
Title	Year	FRA	BEL (Wa)	SWI	LUX	Album
"Extasy"	2018	47	—	—	—	Cicatrices
"Bernard Tapie"	2018	182	—	—	—	Non-album single
"Extasy"	2018	44	49	—	—	Cicatrices
"Spiderman (Freestyle OKLM)"	2018	158	—	—	—	Non-album singles
"Booska Rocket"	2019	62	—	—	—	Non-album singles
"Zolabeille"	2019	42	—	—	—	Cicatrices
"Papers" (featuring Ninho)	2019	18	—	56	—	Cicatrices
"Fuckboi"	2019	24	—	89	—	Cicatrices
"Bro Bro"	2020	3	29	51	—	Non-album singles
"Wow"	2020	5	37	52	—	Non-album singles
"Booska'Sten"	2020	31	21	—	—	Non-album singles
"9 1 1 3" (featuring SCH)	2020	1	23	51	—	Survie
"Amber"	2022	1	11	21	8	TBA
"Toute la journée" (featuring Tiakola)	2023	4	15	26	16	TBA
"Cœur de ice" (featuring Damso)	2023	1	2	7	—	Diamant du Bled
"Aller sans retour" (with Koba LaD)	2023	14	38	—	—	Frères ennemis
"Temps en temps" (with Koba LaD featuring Kore)	2024	3	10	—	—	Frères ennemis
"Amiri Jeans" (with Koba LaD)	2024	9	41	—	—	Frères ennemis

=== Other charted songs ===
Title	Year	Peak positions			Album
Title	Year	FRA	BEL (Wa)	SWI	Album
"Baby boy"	2019	27	—	96	Cicatrices
"Mojo"	2019	31	—	—	Cicatrices
"L1 L2"	2019	—	—	—	Cicatrices
"7.65"	2019	46	—	—	Cicatrices
"Jamais"	2019	48	—	—	Cicatrices
"Astroboy"	2019	50	—	—	Cicatrices
"Kinshasa"	2019	56	—	—	Cicatrices
"Alloicizolaski4" (featuring Key Largo & No'Name)	2019	57	—	—	Cicatrices
"Club"	2019	58	—	—	Cicatrices
"Cicatrices"	2019	53	—	—	Cicatrices
"B.A.L"	2019	89	—	—	Cicatrices
"Papillon"	2020	6	—	81	Survie
"Ma jolie" (feat. Leto)	2020	7	—	95	Survie
"Madame"	2020	13	—	—	Survie
"Le sauveur"	2020	17	—	—	Survie
"Mula"	2020	21	—	—	Survie
"Pollos hermanos"	2020	26	—	—	Survie
"TLM"	2020	28	—	—	Survie
"Pistou"	2020	29	—	—	Survie
"Cache cash"	2020	37	—	—	Survie
"Les puristes"	2020	43	—	—	Survie
"Money Train"	2020	48	—	—	Survie
"Tu connais l'gang"	2020	52	—	—	Survie
"Nochey"	2023	9	30	79	Diamant du Bled
"Envie7vie"	2023	10	—	—	Diamant du Bled
"L'Armoire"	2023	14	—	—	Diamant du Bled
"Frosties"	2023	16	—	—	Diamant du Bled
"Electro"	2023	18	—	—	Diamant du Bled
"Zaza"	2023	20	—	—	Diamant du Bled
"Brulures Indiennes"	2023	24	—	—	Diamant du Bled
"Cote Hublot"	2023	37	—	—	Diamant du Bled
"Gorgee Pour Les Morts"	2023	39	—	—	Diamant du Bled
"Make Up"	2023	41	—	—	Diamant du Bled
"Cartier PanthÈre"	2023	43	—	—	Diamant du Bled
"La Lumiere"	2023	53	—	—	Diamant du Bled
"C'est Non" (with koba Lad)	2024	37	—	—	Frères ennemis
"Parano" (with koba Lad)	2024	42	—	—	Frères ennemis
"Un Billet" (with koba Lad)	2024	43	—	—	Frères ennemis
"Mexicana" (with koba Lad)	2024	50	—	—	Frères ennemis
"Roulette Russe" (with koba Lad)	2024	52	—	—	Frères ennemis
"Dans La Nuit" (with koba Lad)	2024	58	—	—	Frères ennemis
"Freres Ennemis" (with koba Lad)	2024	61	—	—	Frères ennemis
