= Au delà des rêves =

Studio album by Amine
- Released: December 26, 2005
- Recorded: 2004–2005
- Genre: R&B, Raï'n'B, contemporary R&B, French R&B
- Language: French, Moroccan
- Label: Virgin Music France

Amine chronology
Au delà des rêves (2005)	Mes sources (2008)

Singles from Au delà des rêves
- 1. "Ma vie" Released: 25 August 2005; 2. "J'voulais" Released: 21 January 2006; 3. "My Girl" Released: 26 May 2006

Au delà des rêves is a 2005 album by French-Moroccan R&B singer Amine. It was released on December 26, 2005 and includes the number-one single "J'voulais, in addition to "Ma vie" and "My Girl".

The album reached number 16 on the French SNEP Official Albums Chart. It also charted in Belgian Ultratop Wallonia Albums Chart reaching number 59.

== Track listing ==
1. "Introduction"
2. "Ma vie"
3. "J'voulais"
4. "My Girl"
5. "Finiki"
6. "Si j'avais su que"
7. "Femmes"
8. "6ème sens"
9. "Win"
10. "Had Lila" (version Arabe)
11. "Kindir"
12. "Le Chemin"
13. "Sobri" (notre destin) (remix club)
14. "Ma vie" with Big Ali

== Charts ==
Chart performance for Au delà des rêves
Chart (2005)	Peak position
Belgian Albums (Ultratop Wallonia)	59
French Albums (SNEP)	16
