= Je suis et je resterai =

- Album cover for "Je suis et je resterai"

Studio album by Leslie
- Released: November 13, 2002
- Recorded: 2001–2002
- Studios: Studio EMC, Master Studio
- Genres: French R&B
- Length: 53:49
- Label: M6 Interactions
- Producers: Cutee B, Maleko, David "Little D." Adet, Georges Padey

Leslie chronology
Je suis et je resterai (2002)	Mes Couleurs (2004)

Singles from Je suis et je resterai
- 1. "Le bon choix" Released: March 27, 2002; 2. "Je suis et je resterai" Released: July 7, 2002; 3. "On n'sait jamais" Released: November 13, 2002; 4. "Pardonner" Released: March 26, 2003

Je suis et je resterai is the 2002 debut album by French R&B–pop singer Leslie. It contains the four singles, "Le bon choix", "Je suis et je resterai", "On n'sait jamais", and "Pardonner". The album peaked at number 41 on the Top French Albums Chart, and sold a total of 130,000 copies in France.

== Background ==
Prior to working on her first album, Leslie participated in the show Graines de star (Stardust) in 2001, leading to her winning the musical category for the show. Shortly after this, it led to her being discovered by producer Maleko who was associated with EMC Records and M6 Interactions. He and produced her debut single, "Le bon choix".

== Track listing ==
1. "Intro"
2. "Est-de ma faute?"
3. "Je suis et je resterai"
4. "Pardonner"
5. "On n'sait jamais (dans la vie)" [featuring Sweety & Magic System]
6. "Le bon choix"
7. "Que puis-je y faire?"
8. "J'Suis pas faite pour a" [featuring Willy Denzey]
9. "Solo illusiones" [featuring Gulseren]
10. "Apparences"
11. "Salis par ces gens (What's Your Name?)" [featuring Med' Allory]
12. "Vous devez me laisser faire"
13. "Comme un amour"
14. "Si seulement" [featuring Little D]
15. "Annonce-moi la couleur"

== Charts ==
Chart (2002–03)	Highest position
French Albums (SNEP)	41
