= Mohammed Lamine =

Ghanaian footballer (born 2000)

Personal information
- Date of birth: 2 February 2000 (age 26)
- Place of birth: Buduburam, Ghana
- Height: 1.70 m (5 ft 7 in)
- Position: Midfielder

Team information
- Current team: Atletico Suzuka
- Number: 31

Youth career
- Accra Lions

Senior career*
Years	Team	Apps	(Gls)
2017–2018	Accra Lions		
2019–2020	AS Trenčín	14	(1)
2020–2024	Oliveirense	13	(0)
2023	→ Camacha (loan)	10	(0)
2024–	Atletico Suzuka	9	(1)

International career
- Ghana U20
- * Club domestic league appearances and goals as of 23 November 2024

Mohammed Lamine (born 2 February 2000) is a Ghanaian professional footballer who plays as a midfielder for Japanese club Atletico Suzuka.

== Club career ==
=== AS Trenčín ===
Lamine made his professional Fortuna Liga debut for AS Trenčín against Senica on 16 February 2019. Trenčín won the game 3:0 with Lamine playing the entire game.

=== Camacha ===
On 31 January 2023, Lamine joined Camacha on loan.
