= Kore (producer) =

- Also known as: Dj Kore
- Born: Djamel Fezari; January 16, 1978 (age 48); Paris, France
- Origin: French, Algerian
- Genres: Hip-hop; R&B; raï; pop
- Occupations: DJ; producer; composer; entrepreneur
- Years active: 1997—present
- Labels: Artop Records (founder), AWA (founder)

Kore, born Djamel Fezari, is a French DJ, producer, composer and entrepreneur of Algerian origin. He started out as a DJ when hip-hop arrived in France in the late 1990s. He made a name for himself in the rap industry by producing Rohff's TDSI. He collaborated with Booba on his two albums. He went on to work with artists such as Kery James, Mac Tyer and Sexion d'Assaut.

He merged Raï and RnB with the Raï'n'B Fever project in the 2000s. Four volumes were released.

Influenced by American Hip-hop culture, in 2010 he exports to the USA with Rick Ross's Maybach Music label. He will produce for artists such as French Montana or Kid Cudi, and in a more popular style with Will.i.am or Kelly Rowland.

he helped and collaborated with the rapper SCH on the launch of his career with the project A7. He also produced on his first double platinum album. It also accompanies the career launch of Lacrim with his album and his mixtapes. He then collaborated with Alonzo, Niska, Rim'K, Kool Shen, Seth Gueko, Lefa, Mister You, Sadek, L'Algérino, Dosseh, Gradur, etc...

At the same time, he arrived on the electronic scene by producing the albums of Brodinski and Club Cheval. Due to his openness to the industry, he has also worked in the cinema industry on movie soundtracks.

With his label Arab With Attitude (AWA), he is one of the major players in the French urban scene and by producing artists like Luv Resval, Diddi Trix, Nahir or even Zola.

== Biography ==
=== Early life ===
Born in Seine-Saint-Denis to Algerian parents, he grew up between Montreuil and Bondy and spent part of his youth in the Val-d'Oise.

He learned everything about the world of music from a very young age from his uncle, a member of the Zoulou Nation collective. He got his start in underground rap culture as a DJ in the late 1990s. Very quickly, he worked with the pioneers of French rap like NTM or the group Lunatic.

In 1997, he joined forces with Skalpovich and produced artists such as Costello and K-Reen and numerous mixtapes. Two years later, they signed with Sony Music in 2001.

=== French rap ===
In the 2000s, Kore worked with various artists such as: Rohff, Leslie, Scred Connexion, Don Choa or Eloquence. He experienced his first successes thanks to the two singles of Rohff TDSI and 5,9,1 both sold more than 500,000 copies by Rohff. He collaborates with Booba on his two albums Panthéon and Ouest Side. He subsequently worked with artists such as Kery James, Mac Tyer and Sexion d'Assault.

Following his departure for the United States, he was approached by Def Jam Recordings in 2014 to develop new artists. The following year he produced the first album Corleone from Lacrim. He included in this collaboration American artists like Lil Durk or French Montana with whom they released the song "AWA". He subsequently produced, alongside Lacrim, the mixtapes R.I.P.R.O. Volume I and R.I.P.R.O. Volume II both certified platinum.

In 2015, he produced the first mixtape of SCH, A7 and the titles Gomorra and Champs-Élysées. He also produced on his first double album certified platinum Anarchie in 2016 with in particular I know her, Anarchy and 6.45i, certified platinum single.

He also produces La Vida Loca by Ghetto Phénomène and collaborates on the albums of Kool Shen, Niska, Alonzo, Rim 'K.

It was during the year 2018, that he became interested in the rapper Zola with whom he developed a privileged artistic relationship. Together, they produced two singles, "Bernard Tapie" and "Scarface", then his first album Cicatrices in 2019 which is crowned certified double platinum with the title Papers certified diamond disc, and finally his 2nd album Survie in 2020 which is also certified double platinum. For the artist's third album "Diamant du Bled", released in March 2023, he collaborates on four tracks: "Amber", "Envie7Vie", "Toute la journée" feat. Tiakola and "Côté Hublôt".

=== RnB and Urban Pop ===
In the 2000s, Kore produced for artists like Corneille, Willy Denzey and M. Pokora. He produced the first album Au-délà des rêves by Amine and Mes Couleurs by Leslie, which allowed his identification and beginning of rise in the music industry. He will also accompany these two artists throughout their careers.

In 2015, he worked on the albums of Kendji Girac and Marina Kaye. In 2017 he produced the album Rio by Christophe Willem.

=== Raï'n'B Fever ===
In 2004, Kore got closer to their Algerian roots and with Skalpovich, they undertook a new mix of genres in the same year with Raï and RnB. They then released the first volume of Raï'n'B Fever which was certified gold thanks to singles like Un Gaou à Oran from 113, Magic System and Mohamed Lamine or even Sobri by Leslie and Amine.

In 2006 with his brother Dj Bellek, they released a second part of Raï'n'B Fever. This volume will feature international artists such as Kelly Rowland and Amerie.

The following year, in 2007, a Raï'n'B Fever concert was organized in Bercy in front of 12,000 spectators where the majority of the artists from the 3 albums participated. The profits from this event are donated to the association "Comité des Familles", structure which supports families in the Paris suburbs affected by illnesses such as AIDS.

Alone this time, he released Raï'n'B Fever 3 in 2008, integrating sounds of salsa and electronic music. This volume will enter directly at second place in the Top Albums.

Still with this objective of democratizing Raï music, in 2011 he will add a fourth volume to the Raï'n'B Fever saga.

=== Career in the United States ===
Always inspired by the American culture, he left in 2010 for the United States. He settled in Miami where he met and created links with American rappers like Rick Ross, French Montana and even Will.i.am. Introduced to the heart of the trap movement, he learned to master autotune and topline certain pieces. He will then place compositions for Mayback Music and will also produce for Wale, Kid Cudi and even Shaggy.

=== Electro ===
In 2014 he began working on electronic music by composing on the albums of Brodinski such as Brava or Discipline of Horse Club.

In 2021 he participates in the album Born a Loser by Myd and produced the song The Sun.

=== Original film soundtracks ===
Determined to put urban culture in the spotlight, the duo Kore and Skalpovich decided to bring together the Rap and RnB scene to produce the Original soundtrack for the film by Luc Besson Taxi 3 and Taxi 5, Cliente, Pattaya by Franck Gastambide. Following this, he brought together several artists in 2021 such as Ninho, Lacrim, Sadek, Vald, PLK to compose the Original soundtrack of the film Netflix En passant pécho.

=== Entrepreneurship ===
In 2003, he opened his first publishing and phonographic production company : the Artop Records label.

The year 2018 will be marked by his signing with Sony Music in the United States and the creation of his label AWA with which he signs the artists Zola, Luv Resval, Diddi Trix, Nahir...

=== Privacy ===
He is married to the singer Leslie and father of two children · .

== Discography ==
=== Certified singles ===
Year	Artist	Track	Certification
2001	Rohff	5 9 1	Gold
2004	113	Un Gaou à Oran (feat Magic System & Mohamed Lamine)	Diamond
2004	Willy Denzey	L'orphelin	Gold
2004	M.Pokora	Pas sans toi	Gold
2004	M.Pokora	Elle me contrôle (feat Sweety)	Gold
2004	M.Pokora	Show Biz	Gold
2005	Magic System	Bouger Bouger (feat Mokobé)	Platinum
2005	Amine	J'voulais	Diamond
2005	Amine	My girl	Gold
2005	Magic System	C Cho Ca Brûle	Gold
2014	Lacrim	Barbade	Gold
2015	Lacrim	A.W.A	Diamond
2015	Amine	Tu verras	Gold
2015	Amine	Senorita	Gold
2015	SCH	Champs-Elysées	Diamond
2015	SCH	Gomorra	Gold
2016	Alonzo	On met les voiles	Gold
2016	Alonzo	Regarde-moi	Gold
2016	SCH	Je la connais	Diamond
2016	SCH	Anarchie	Platinum
2016	SCH	Allo maman	Diamond
2016	SCH	Dix-neuf	Gold
2016	SCH	Cartine Cartier (feat Sfera Ebbasta)	Gold
2017	Ghetto Phénomène	Maria Maria (feat Jul)	Platinum
2017	Sadek	Madre Mia (feat Ninho)	Diamond
2017	Sadek	En leuleu (feat Niska)	Gold
2017	SCH	6 45i	Platinum
2017	SCH	Comme si	Platinum
2018	L'Algérino	Va Bene	Diamond
2018	Ninho	Boite Auto	Gold
2018	Alonzo	Santana	Diamond
2018	Zola	California Girl	Platinum
2018	Zola	California Girl	Platinum
2019	13block	Petit coeur	Gold
2019	Djadja et Dinaz	Carré d'As	Gold
2019	Zola	Extasy	Platinum
2019	Zola	Ouais Ouais	Diamond
2019	Zola	7 65	Gold
2019	Zola	Astroboy	Platinum
2019	Zola	Mojo	Gold
2019	Zola	Baby Boy	Gold
2019	Zola	Fuckboi	Platinum
2019	Zola	L1 L2	Diamond
2019	Zola	Zolabeille	Gold
2019	Zola	Papers (feat Ninho)	Diamond
2020	Zola	Bro Bro	Platinum
2020	13 Block	Petit coeur	Platinum
2020	Zola	Sanchez	Gold
2020	Zola	Bad Bi	Gold
2020	Zola	Wow	Diamond
2020	Zola	Madame	Diamond
2020	Zola	Papillon	Platinum
2020	Zola	Vista	Gold
2020	Zola	Ma jolie (feat Leto)	Gold
2020	Zola	9 1 1 3 (feat SCH)	Diamond
2020	Lacrim	Allez nique ta mère (feat Soso Maness)	Gold
2021	Kore & Werenoi	Tucibi - En Passant Pécho BO	Gold
2021	Kore & Lacrim	Mango - En Passant Pécho BO	Platinum
2021	Kore & Ninho	Mon Poto - En Passant Pécho BO	Diamond
2021	Myd	The Sun	Diamond
2022	Zola	Amber	Diamond
2023	Zola	Toute la journée (feat Tiakola)	Diamond
2023	Zola	Envie7Vie	Gold
2024	Zola & Koba LaD	Temps en Temps	Diamond
2024	Kore & Hamza	Lalla	Gold

=== Certified Albums ===
Year	Artist	Album	Certification
2004	Raï'n'B Fever	Volume 1	Or
2004	Leslie	Mes couleurs	2× Gold
2005	Amine	Au-delà des rêves	Gold
2006	Raï'n'B Fever	Volume 2	Gold
2009	Raï'n'B Fever	Volume 3	Gold
2014	Lacrim	Corléone	2× Platinum
2015	Lacrim	R.I.P.R.O Vol. 1	Platinum
2015	Lacrim	R.I.P.R.O Vol. 2	Platinum
2015	SCH	A7	Diamond
2016	SCH	Anarchie	2× Platinum
2017	Marina Kaye	Explicit	Gold
2018	Movie Soundtracks Album	Taxi 5	Gold
2019	Zola	Cicatrices	2× Platinum
2020	Zola	Survie	2× Platinum
2021	Luv Resval	Etoile Noire : Brise-Monde	Platine
2021	Movie Soundtracks Album	En Passant Pécho	Gold

=== Raï'n'B Fever - Volume 1 (2004) Gold ===
- Intro : Bonjour la France - Omar & Fred
- Un Gaou à Oran - 113, Magic System & Mohamed Lamine - Gold
- Sobri - Leslie & Amine
- Mon Bled - Rohff, Mohamed Lamine & Chebba Maria
- Le Génie - Amine & La Fouine
- Retour aux sources - Rim'K, Khaled & Mohamed Lamine
- Raï'n'B Fever - Faudel & Jérome Prister
- Reggae Raï Fever - J.Mi Sissoko & Cheb Tarik
- J'suis pas d'ici - Ogb & Sahraoui
- Just Married - Amine & Relic
- N'tya - Mohamed Lamine & Kayliah
- Madame Madame - Omar & Fred
- Yeppa Mama - Cheb Bilal & Leïla Rami
- Ma Leïla - Shaheen & Yaleïl
- L'orphelin - Willy Denzey & Fadee Riman
- Rimitti Ridim - Cheikha Rimitti
- Outro : Chabani Nonda - Omar & Fred

=== Raï'n'B Fever - Volume 2 (2006) Gold ===
- Hey Madame - Mustapha & Omar & Fred
- C Chô, Ca Brûle - Magic System, Akil, Bilal & Big Ali - Gold
- 200 degrés - Zahouna, Bilal, Nessbeal & Big Ali
- Crunk Didi (Losin'U) - Amerie, Willy Denzey & Six Coups MC
- Sobri 2 - Leslie & Amine
- Non C'Sera Non (Omri Omri) - Cheb Mami & Diam's
- Africa Riddim - Amadou & Mariam, Taoues & Leslie
- Ola Ola - Kamel Shadi, Sweety & LS
- D'où je viens - Idir, Rim'K & Sniper
- Raïnbfever.com - Amine & M. Pokora
- Interlude - Dj Youcef
- A moi la vie - Douzi, Justine, Six Coups MC & Big Ali
- H'bibi I Love You - Amine & Kelly Rowland
- Cholé - Cholé - Reda Talliani & Rappeur d'Instincts
- Reviens-moi - Shaheen, Cheb Bilal, Malika & Al Peco
- Ibiza à Tamanrasset - Mustapha & Omar & Fred

=== Raï'n'B Fever - Volume 3 (2008) Gold ===
- Bienvenue Chez Les Bylkas - Sinik, Cheb Billal & Big Ali
- Ya mama - Kenza Farah & Najim
- Habibi - Leslie & Amar
- Crois en tes rêves - Amel Bent & Mohamed Reda
- Amitiés Sacrées - Tlf & Zahouania
- Te quiero - Amine & Kayliah
- Ca passe ou ça kasse - Reda Talliani & Tunisiano
- Jusqu'au bout du monde - Willy Denzey & Najim
- Raï-Kaï - Lim, Reda Talliani & Samira
- Origines - Mélissa M & Amine
- Cette soirée-là - K-Reen, Kamelancien & Cheb Hassan
- C l'ambiance - L'Algérino & Sahraoui
- Ya Dellali - Cheb Billal & Shynze
- Emmène-moi - Akil & Lela Rami
- Il suffira - Shaheen & Yalleil
- Ya Denia - Cheba Maria, Cheb Amar & Aketo
- Kellem - Cheb Bilal & Selma

=== Raï'n'B Fever - Volume 4 (2011) ===
- Sahbi - Dj Kore & Sexion D'assaut
- Vas-y molo - Dj Kore, Magic System, Shaggy & Mohamed Allaouna
- Heya - Dj Kore, Khalass & Psy4
- Je veux chanter (interlude) - Dj Kore & Brulé
- Zahwani - You - Dj Kore, Mister You, Lacrim & Zahouani
- Tu mérites mieux - Dj Kore, Isleym, Najim & Le Rat Luciano
- Gewatane Fever - Dj Kore, Seth Gueko, GSX & Khalass
- Ma voie - Dj Kore, TLF & Amar
- T'as pas assez - Dj Kore, Pitbull, 18 K-Ra & Khalass
- Alabina Beach - Dj Kore, Amine & Kulture Shock
- J'ai décidé - Dj Kore, Meh & Cheba Sousou
- Nous on s'en fou - Dj Kore, Amine, Logobi GT & Still Fresh
- Loin - Dj Kore, Kenza Farah & Cheb Mami
- Allaoui Fever - Dj Kore, Hanini & Sofiane
- Vote ou raï Pt.1 - Dj Kore, Balti, Mister You & Lotfi Double Canon
- Vote ou raï Pt.2 - Dj Kore & 11 artistes

=== Movie Soundtracks ===
- Taxi 3 (2003)
- Cliente (2008)
- La Marche (Single Marche) (2013)
- Pourquoi j'ai pas mangé mon père (Single Get Up Et Fais Ton Truc) (2015)
- Pattaya (2016)
- Taxi 5 (2018) - Gold
- En Passant Pécho - (2021) Gold
