= Amine (singer) =

French-Moroccan R&B singer

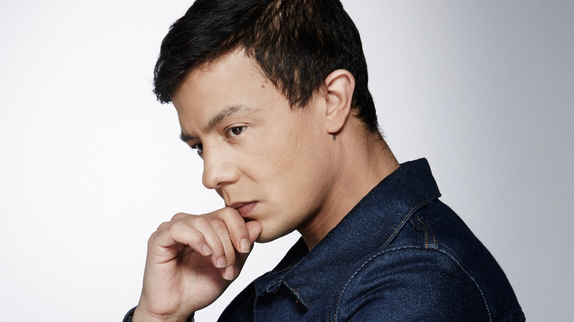
- Amine in 2019

Background information
- Born: Amine Mounder; December 20, 1984 (age 41); Casablanca, Morocco
- Origin: France
- Genres: R&B
- Years active: 2003–present
- Labels: Capitol, EMI
- Website: Amine

Amine Mounder (born December 20, 1984) best known by his mononym Amine, is a French-Moroccan R&B singer. He is known for his singular music style, Raï'n'B, which is a mix of R&B and Raï. His biggest hits are "Ma vie", "J'voulais" and a duet with French singer Leslie in "Sobri (notre destin)". "Sobri" and "J'voulais" both reached the number-one spot on the French singles chart in 2006. Amine also charted in Belgium and Switzerland.

He also took part in a number of festivals, notably L'année de l'Algérie at Bercy in December 2003, and in Le Maroc en fête at the Paris Zénith.

Amine had a comeback in 2015 with hits like "Señorita" and "Tu verras".

== Discography ==
=== Albums ===
Year	Album	Peak positions
Year	Album	FR
2005	Au delà des rêves	16
2008	Mes sources	–
2009	Autour d'eux	89

=== Singles ===
Year	Single	Peak positions			Album
Year	Single	FR	BEL (Wa)	SUI	Album
2005	"Ma vie"	15	2* (Ultratip)	79	Au-delà des rêves
2006	"J'voulais"	1	10	27	Au-delà des rêves
2006	"My Girl"	29	3* (Ultratip)	–	Au-delà des rêves
2006	"Finiki"	–	–	–	Au-delà des rêves
2006	"Sobri 2" (Leslie & Amine)	12	30	–	Raï'n'B Fever 2
2009	"Juste un oui"	–	–	–	Autour d'eux
2009	"Tu ne m'as pas laissé le choix"	–	–	–	Autour d'eux
2015	"Señorita"	17	4	–	
2015	"Tu verras"	–	14* (Ultratip)	–	
2016	"Rendez-vous"	–	–	–	

*Did not appear in the official Belgian Ultratop 50 charts, but rather in the bubbling under Ultratip charts.

=== Other songs ===
- 2006:"Finiki" (written by Mouad Hamich Prod.by Dj kore & Bellek)
- 2009 "Juste un oui" (Arab version)
- 2009 "Maat lohiche" (feat. Cheb Bilal)

=== Featured in ===
Year	Single	Peak positions			Album
Year	Single	FR	BEL (Wa)	SUI	Album
2004	"Sobri (notre destin)" (Leslie feat. Amine)	2	2	29	
2004	"Just Married" (Relic feat. Amine)	28	–	–	
2007	"On va samizé" (Magic System feat. Amine)	26	–	–	
2016	"Run" (Naskid & Trackstorm feat. Amine)	–	–	–	
2016	"Petit Baba Noël" (Baba feat. Amine)	2	–	–	
