= Willy Denzey =

French singer

- Born: William Thongrasamy; 19 August 1982 (age 43); Melun, France
- Genres: R&B; soul; hip hop
- Occupation: Singer
- Years active: 2002–present
- Website: willydenzey.com

William Thongrasamy (born 19 August 1982), known under the pseudonym Willy Denzey, is a French-born contemporary R&B and soul singer of Laotian origin.

== Biography ==
Denzey was born as William Thongrasamy in Melun, France, and spent his childhood in Le Mée-sur-Seine. At 15, he formed with his friends a band named Prodyge. In June 2000, he participated in the broadcast Graines de star and reached the final. A producer noticed him and proposed him to release a disc. In 2001, he participated in the Francofolies of La Rochelle, then in 2002 released his first single, "Que te dire".

Denzey released in May 2003 a second single, "Le mur du son", which earned a gold disc in France for over 300 000 copies sold. On 3 November 2003, he released his first album, # 1, in which many artists participated, including La Fouine, Diam's, Kader Riwan & Ol Kainry. His single "L'Orphelin" become a top ten hit in France. Reloaded on 15 March 2004 with bonus track "Badaboom Remix" (French Version) (Feat B2K).

27 September 2004, Denzey released a new album entitled Act II, composed of hip-hop and R&B songs and romantic ballads, including a collaboration with Wayne Beckford, XS, Neje, Mathieu 8, Darren, and Little D. Then he released in January 2005 the song "Et si tu n'existais pas", a cover of Joe Dassin. Inclus, "Hello" by Lionel Richie. Thereafter, Denzey toured throughout France.

He also performed "Double Mise" ("Bet on it"), used in the movie High School Musical 2, produced and broadcast by Disney Channel remixed par Kore (DJ Kore).

However, after the failure of his last single, "Mon Royaume" (Feat Eloquence), which did not appear on the chart, his third album (feat Amerie, Papoose, Marques Houston, Cassidy, Humphrey & co) originally scheduled to be released on 13Novembre 2006, was cancelled. New single "L'homme Qu'il Te Faut" released on 1 June 2012.

== Discography ==
=== Albums ===
Year	Title	Peak position			Certifications
Year	Title	FR	BE (WA)	SWI	Certifications
2003	#1	23	—	—	SNEP: Gold
2004	Acte II	23	89	—	
2006	Mon Royaume (unreleased)	—	—	—	
"—" denotes a recording that did not chart or was not released in that territory.

=== Singles ===
Year	Title	Peak position			Certifications	Album
Year	Title	FR	BE (WA)	SWI	Certifications	Album
2002	"Que vous dire"	52	—	—		
2003	"Le mur du son (Bounce)"	8	11	33	SNEP: Gold	
2003	"#1 (Si tu veux)"	20	—	—		
2004	"L'Orphelin"	5	16	30	SNEP: Gold	
2004	"Honey"	30	21	74		Acte II
2005	"Et si tu n'existais pas"	5	4	—		Acte II
2006	"Mon Royaume"	—	—	—		
2007	"Double mise"	—	—	—		
"—" denotes a recording that did not chart or was not released in that territory.
