= Kore & Skalp =

French music artists

- Origin: France
- Genres: Hip hop, pop, R&B, pop rock
- Years active: 2001–2006
- Labels: Sony Music France
- Members: Kore (Djamel Fezari); Skalp (Pascal Koeu)

Kore & Skalp are two DJs and producers who have worked together since 1997. Among others, they have made mixtapes, concerts and Scratch performances. And they have produced music for many underground groups, e.g. Eloquence, Costello and la Scred Connexion. Since 2001, Kore & Skalp have been at Sony Music France. They separated in 2006 after 5 years together.

== Career ==
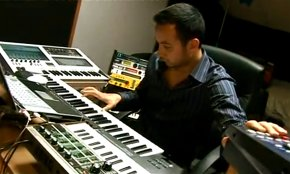
Skalp in studio

Kore (real name Djamel Fezari) & Skalp (real name Pascal Boniani Koeu) have mixed tracks by a great number of French artists. They produced the album La Vie Avant la Mort (Life Before Death) by French rapper Rohff, and they have taken part in producing songs for albums by Booba, Don Choa, Willy Denzey, Leslie and all of the comedy DVDs by Jamel Debbouze. They have made the music to the movie Taxi 3 along with DJ Mehdi and The Neptunes.

In 2003, the duo decided to go their own way. Artop Records offered them independence so they could develop their own projects and help some artists in the beginning of their new career, like the R'n'B singer Amine.

In 2004 the team produced Booba and Leslie's albums, and toured with them as DJs. At the same time the duo made their first album named Raï'n'B Fever which mixed R'n'B and Raï. The album came out in France in June 2004, and went gold with over 75,000 sold copies. The single "Un Gaou à Oran", with 113, the Algerian raï star Mohammed Lamine and Magic System was a big hit in France during the summer and autumn 2004. On the album, French R'n'B artists such as Corneille, Willy Denzey and Leslie appeared. Also, great raï names Khaled, Faudel, Amine and several French rap stars like Rohff and 113 were included on the album.

In summer 2006 Raï'n'B Fever 2 was released, and stars like Amerie, Kelly Rowland, Amine, M. Pokora, Leslie and Sniper could be found on the CD.

== Discography ==
=== Singles ===
Year	Title	Singers	Charts FRA	Certification FRA
2001	"T.D.S.I."	Rohff	38	—
2002	"5 9 1"	Rohff feat. Assia	15	Silver
2002	"Le bon choix" (Remix)	Leslie feat. Eloquence	11	—
2003	"Ronde de Nuit"	Gomez et Dubois feat. Amine	10	—
2003	"Qu'est-ce tu fous cette nuit"	Humphrey feat. Busta Flex	31	—
2003	"Match nul"	Kayliah feat. Eloquence	22	—
2003	"Pardonner" (Remix)	Leslie	18	—
2004	"L'orphelin"	Willy Denzey	5	Silver
2004	"Cette Lettre"	Willy Denzey	15	—
2004	"Sobri"	Leslie feat. Amine	2	—
2004	"Un gaou à Oran"	Magic System feat. 113	8	Silver
2004	"Just Married"	Relic	30	
2004	"Showbiz"	M. Pokora	10	Silver
2005	"Elle me contrôle"	M. Pokora	6	Silver
2005	"Vivons Pour demain"	Leslie	23	—
2005	"Bouger Bouger"	Magic System feat. Mokobé	7	—
2005	"Protège toi"	Collectif Protection rapprochée	24	—
2005	"Ma vie"	Amine	15	—
2005	"Pas sans toi"	M. Pokora	4	—
2005	"J'voulais"	Amine	1	—
2006	"My Girl	Amine	29	—

=== Albums ===
Année	Artistes	Album	Track	Certification
2001	Rohff	La vie avant la mort	Track 03: TDSI (Single); Track 12: 5,9,1(Single); Track 16: Outro	Platinum
2002	Scred Connexion	Du mal à s'confier	Track 02: Trop saoulé Track 06: On pense tous monnaie	—
2002	Leslie	Je suis et je resterai	Track 04: Pardonner (remix) (Single); Track 06: Le bon choix (remix) (Single)	Gold
2002	Don Choa	Vapeurs toxiques	Track 07: Doucement; Track 13: Sale sud	Gold
2003	Gomez & Dubois	Flics et hors la loi	Track 12: Ronde de nuit (Single); Track 13: Chez djamel	Gold
2003	Taxi 3	Taxi 3 Bande Originale	Track 01: Making of Track 02: Qu'est c'tu fout cette nuit? (Single); Track 03: Match nul (Single); Track 04: Les rues de ma ville Track 05: Plus vite que jamais Track 10: Tarif c Track 11:L'allumage; Track 13: Profite; Track 14: Laissez nous vivre Track 15: P'tite sœur	Gold
2003	Dadoo	France history X	Track 21: Making of	—
2003	Corneille	Parce qu'on vient de loin	Track 15: Laissez-nous vivre	Platinum
2003	Willy Denzey	#1	Track 03: Life; Track 05: Cette lettre (Single); Track 06: L'orphelin (Single)	—
2003	Talents Fachés	Talents Fachés	Track 01: Intro; Track 13: Made you look Track 16: A quand mon heure Track 29: Tu t'reconnais	—
2004	Booba	Panthéon	Track 02: Le mal par le mal Track 03: Commis d'office Track 08: La faucheuse Track 12: Bâtiment c	Gold
2004	Kery James	Savoir et vivre ensemble	Track 04: Malgré les épreuves (disc 2)	—
2004	Kore & Skalp	Raï'n'B Fever	Track 01: Bonjour la France; Track 02: Un gaou à oran (Single); Track 03: Sobri (Single); Track 04: Mon bled Track 05: Le génie Track 06: Retour aux sources Track 07: Rai'n'b fever Track 08: Reggae rai fever Track 09: J'suis pas d'ici Track 10: Just married (Single); Track 11: N tya Track 12: Madame madame Track 13: Yeppa mama Track 14: Ma leila Track 15: L'orphelin (Single); Track 16: rimitti ridim Track 17: Chabani nonda	Platinum
2004	Relic	Légendes urbaines	Track 02: Légendes urbaines Track 09: Just married (Single)	—
2004	Leslie	Mes Couleurs	Track 01: Intro; Track 02: Sobri (notre destin) (Single); Track 04: Nos colères Track 06:Le temps qui passe Track 08: Tout ces gens Track 10: Sans toi Track 11: Dice-dice; Track 12: J'accuse; Bonus: Vivons pour demain (Single)	Platinum
2004	M. Pokora	Matt Pokora	Track 02: Showbiz (Single); Track 03: Elle me contrôle (Single); Track 04: Pas sans toi (Single); Track 08: Tourne pas le dos	Platinum
2004	Street Lourd	Hall Stars	Track 12: Pour les halls Track 16: Tu peux pas	—
2004	Corneille	Live 2004	Track 04: Laissez nous vivre	Platinum
2005	Magic System	Cessa kié la vérité	Track 02: Bouger bouger Track 13: Un gaou à Oran; Track 14: Bouger bouger (remix) (Single)	Platinum
2005	Protection Rapprochée	Protège-toi	Track 01: Protège-toi (Single); Track 02: Protège-toi (clip version)	—
2005	Amine	Au delà des rêves	Track 01: Intro; Track 02: Ma vie (Single); Track 03: J'voulais (Single); Track 04: My girl (Single); Track 05: Finiki; Track 06: Si j'avais su que... Track 07: Femmes; Track 08: Sixième sens Track 09: Win; Track 10: Had lila Track 11: Kindir; Track 12: Le chemin Track13: Sobri (club mix) (Single); Track 14: Just married (Single); Track 15: Ronde de nuit (Single)	Platinum
