= Leslie (singer) =

French pop-R&B singer (born 1985)

Background information
- Born: Leslie Bourgouin; 4 February 1985 (age 41); Le Mans, Pays de la Loire, France
- Genres: R&B; pop
- Occupation: Singer
- Years active: 2002–2013
- Labels: EMC Records; M6 Interactions; Sony Music (previously Sony BMG)
- Website: leslie-officiel.fr

Leslie Bourgouin, better known by her mononym Leslie, is a French pop-R&B singer. Her father is Vietnamese and Polynesian while her mother is French. She is married to French music producer Djamel Ferazi, known as Kore, with whom she has a son.

In 2007, she recorded a duet single with the R&B singer Bobby Valentino, "Accorde-moi".

The same year, she covered several 1980s songs on her album Futur 80, including "Boule de flipper" originally sung by Corynne Charby, "Mise au point" by Jakie Quartz and "Les Bêtises" by Sabine Paturel.

== Discography ==
=== Albums ===
Year	Information	France	French sales
2002	Je suis et je resterai: First studio album; Released: 13 November 2002; Formats: CD	41	130,000
2004	Mes couleurs: Second studio album; Released: 17 May 2004; Formats: CD, digital download	10	220,000
2006	L'amour en vol: Third studio album; Released: 20 November 2006; Formats: CD, digital download	50	100,000
2008	Futur 80: Cancelled album	-	-
2010	À la recherche du bonheur: Fourth studio album; Released: September 2010; Formats: CD, digital download	34	6,000
2012	Les enfants de l'orage: Fifth studio album; Released: 4 February 2013; Formats: CD, digital download	70	3,000

=== Album appearances ===
- 2004: Raï'n'B Fever
- 2006: Raï'n'B Fever 2
- 2008: Raï'n'B Fever 3

=== Singles ===
Year	Single	Charts			French sales	Album
Year	Single	FR	BEL (Wa)	SUI	French sales	Album
2002	"Le bon choix"	11	—	—	140,000	Je suis et je resterai
2002	"Je suis et je resterai"	13	—	—	120,000	Je suis et je resterai
2003	"On n'sait jamais" (featuring Magic System & Sweety)	8	—	22	210,000	Je suis et je resterai
2003	"Pardonner"	18	27	80	110,000	Je suis et je resterai
2004	"Sobri (notre destin)" (featuring Amine)	2	2	29	400,000	Mes couleurs
2004	"Et j'attends"	7	15	38	130,000	Mes couleurs
2005	"Vivons pour demain"	23	—	54	50,000	Mes couleurs
2006	"L'envers de la Terre"	16	—	65	55,000	L'amour en vol
2006	"Sobri 2 (with Amine)	12	—	—	49,000	L'amour en vol
2007	"Accorde-moi" (featuring Bobby Valentino)	11	—	—	22,000	L'amour en vol
2008	"Mise au point"	Promo only				Futur 80
2010	"Tout sur mon père"	—	—	—	—	À la recherche du bonheur
2010	"Never Never"	—	—	—	—	À la recherche du bonheur
2010	"Hier Encore"	—	—	—	—	À la recherche du bonheur
2012	"Des mots invincibles"	75	—	—	8,000	Les enfants de l'orage
2012	"Ma génération"	—	—	—		Les enfants de l'orage
2013	"Je te donne (featuring Ivyrise)"	38	—	—	13,000	Les enfants de l'orage

=== Featured singles ===
Year	Single	Credits	Sales rank			Album
Year	Single	Credits	FR	BEL (Wa)	SUI	Album
2005	"Et puis la Terre..."	As part of collective A.S.I.E.	2	2	8	
2006	"Protège-toi"	As part of collective Protection Rapprochée	24	—	—	
2006	"L'Or de nos vies"	As part of collective Fight Aids	5	14* (Ultratip)	43	
2007	"Pour que tu sois libre"	As part of La Rose Marie Claire	21	30	—	
2008	"Parle, Hugo, parle"	As part of Les Voix de l'Enfant	17	—	—	
2011	"I Need You More"	Crush & Alexandra featuring Leslie	54	—	—	I Need You More
2012	"Je te donne"	Leslie & Ivyrise; As part of collective Génération Goldman	38	—	—	Génération Goldman

*Did not appear in the official Belgian Ultratop 50 charts, but rather in the bubbling under Ultratip charts.
