= Skalpovich =

French record producer, composer, songwriter and record executive

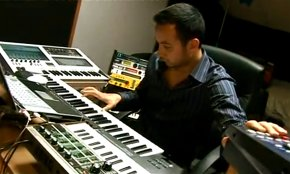

Background information
- Born: Pascal Boniani Koeu
- Genres: Hip hop; pop; R&B; pop rock; world music
- Occupations: Record producer; composer; songwriter; record executive
- Instruments: Keyboard; sampler; drums; guitar
- Years active: 1996–present
- Formerly of: Kore & Skalp
- Spouse: Indila (m. 2007)

Pascal Boniani Koeu better known by his stage name Skalpovich, is a French record producer, composer, songwriter and record executive. Between 2001 and 2006, he was part of duo Kore & Skalp with DJ and producer Kore before continuing solo.

== Biography ==
=== Beginning / Kore & Skalp ===
Born in Épinay-sur-Seine (Paris suburb), Skalpovich began his music career as a DJ, producing several mixtapes under the name of "DJ Skalp" in the late 1990s. In 2001, he produced his first solo tracks named Les Chipies for the only album of the R&B girlgroup Honneur Ô Dames. Focusing on composition and production, he created the first French hip hop hitmaker team Kore & Skalp with DJ Kore. Kore & Skalp separated in 2006.

=== Solo career ===
After separation, Skalpovich chose to develop his solo career, and took the time to form a new team and to participate to new projects. He entirely produced NBA player Tony Parker's first album titled TP (released in March 2007).

== Discography ==
=== Promo singles ===
With Kore & Skalp from 2001 to 2006
Year	Title	Singers	Chart peak positions	Certification
2001	T.D.S.I.	Rohff	#38	—
2002	5 9 1	Rohff feat. Assia	15	Silver
2002	Le bon choix (Remix)	Leslie feat. Eloquence	11	—
2003	Ronde de Nuit	Gomez et Dubois feat. Amine	10	—
2003	Qu'est-ce tu fous cette nuit	Humphrey feat. Busta Flex	31	—
2003	Match Nul	Kayliah feat. Eloquence	22	—
2003	Pardonner (Remix)	Leslie	18	—
2004	L'orphelin	Willy Denzey	5	Silver
2004	Cette Lettre	Willy Denzey	15	—
2004	Sobri	Leslie feat. Amine	2	—
2004	Un gaou à Oran	Magic System feat. 113	8	Silver
2004	Just Married	Relic	30	—
2004	Showbiz	M. Pokora	10	Silver
2005	Elle me contrôle	M. Pokora	6	Silver
2005	Vivons Pour demain	Leslie	23	—
2005	Bouger Bouger	Magic System feat. Mokobé	7	—
2005	Protège toi	Collectif Protection rapprochée	24	—
2005	Ma vie	Amine	15	—
2005	Pas Sans toi	M. Pokora	4	—
2005	J'voulais	Amine	1	—
2006	My Girl	Amine	29	—

Solo Career since 2006
Year	Title	Singers	Charts	Certification
2001	Les Chipies	Honneur Ô Dames	—	
2006	Top of the Game	Tony Parker feat. Fabolous & Booba	—	—
2007	Balance-toi	Tony Parker	1	—
2007	Premier Love	Tony Parker feat. Rickwel	11	—
2007	L'effet Papillon	Tony Parker feat. Jamie Foxx	—	—
2008	Ferme les yeux	Soprano feat. Blacko	16	—
2008	Clandestino	Rim'K feat. Mohamed Lamine & Sheryne	25	—
2008	Afrikan Tonik	Mokobé feat Mohamed Lamine, Mory Kanté & DJ Arafat	—	—
2009	Pardonne-moi	Rickwel	—	—
2009	Danse pour moi	Rickwel	—	—
2009	Je suis libre	APl feat. JMI Sissoko	—	—
2009	Les Cités d'or	Psy 4 de la Rime	—	—
2009	C'est pas Compliqué	Awilo Logomba feat. Awa Imani	—	—
2009	Célébration	113 feat. Awa Imani & Jamel Debbouze	—	—
2010	Pour que tu restes	Vitaa feat. Jeremih	—	—
2010	Viser la victoire	Admiral T feat. La Fouine & Médine	—	—
2010	Criminel	TLF feat. Indila	—	—
2010	Darwa	Soprano	—	—
2010	Poussière d'empire	Nessbeal feat. Indila	—	—
2010	Marseilles By Night	Algerino feat. Nassi	—	—
2010	Hiro	Soprano feat. Indila	26	Silver
2010	Chateau de Sable	Soprano feat. Awa Imani	—	—
2011	D'où l'on vient	La Fouine	53	—
2011	Chérie Coco	Magic System feat. Soprano	2	Gold
2011	Thug Wedding	Rohff feat. Indila	—	—
2011	Lala Fatéma	OGB feat. Mohamed Lamine	—	—
2011	Oulala	Mokobé feat. DJ Arafat	—	—
2012	Ma reine	Axel Tony feat. Admiral T	—	—
2012	Avec toi	Axel Tony	—	—
2012	Histoires vraies	Youssoupha feat. Corneille	10	—
2012	Dreamin'	Youssoupha feat. Indila	2	—
2012	Diguirindi	Mokobé feat. Moussier Tombola	—	—

=== Albums ===
Before 2001
Year	Singers	Album	Track	Certification
Before 2001	93200 Saint-Denis Représente	93200 Saint-Denis Représente	Track 05: triste existence Track 06: j'deviens ouf Track 10: Montana-skalp connexion Track 11: j'ai un but à atteindre Track 12: jusqu'ici tout va bien	—
Before 2001	Le sixième Element	Le Sixième Element	Track 02: 6^{e} élément Track 04: incendi Track 07: freestyle partie 1 Track 10: toxico Track 12: oméga élément Track 14: freestyle partie 2	—
Before 2001	K special	Cause à effet	Track 13: tape pas ton vice Track 15: j'deviens ouf	—
Before 2001	Koma	Ou j'veux quand j'veux	Track 02: le réveil	—
Before 2001	K-reen	Dimension	Track 10: tout ce qu'on veut Track 12: permission de sortir	—
Before 2001	Costello	Costello	Track 01: faut que j'répète Track 02: le morceau "c" Track 03: la bonne connexion Track 04: faut que j'répète (instru)	—

With Kore & Skalp from 2001 to 2006
Année	Artistes	Album	Track	Certification
2001	Rohff	La vie avant la mort	Track 03: TDSI (Single); Track 12: 5,9,1(Single); Track 16: Outro	Platinum
2002	Scred Connexion	Du mal à s'confier	Track 02: Trop saoulé Track 06: On pense tous monnaie	—
2002	Leslie	Je suis et je resterai	Track 04: Pardonner (remix) (Single); Track 06: Le bon choix (remix) (Single)	Gold
2002	Don Choa	Vapeurs toxiques	Track 07: Doucement; Track 13: Sale sud	Gold
2003	Gomez & Dubois	Flics et hors la loi	Track 12: Ronde de nuit (Single); Track 13: Chez djamel	Gold
2003	Taxi 3	Taxi 3 Bande Originale	Track 01: Making of Track 02: Qu'est c'tu fout cette nuit? (Single); Track 03: Match nul (Single); Track 04: Les rues de ma ville Track 05: Plus vite que jamais Track 10: Tarif c Track 11:L'allumage; Track 13: Profite; Track 14: Laissez nous vivre Track 15: P'tite sœur	Gold
2003	Dadoo	France history X	Track 21: Making of	—
2003	Corneille	Parce qu'on vient de loin	Track 15: Laissez-nous vivre	Platinum
2003	Willy Denzey	#1	Track 03: Life; Track 05: Cette lettre (Single); Track 06: L'orphelin (Single)	—
2003	Talents Fachés	Talents Fachés	Track 01: Intro; Track 13: Made you look Track 16: A quand mon heure Track 29: Tu t'reconnais	—
2004	Booba	Panthéon	Track 02: Le mal par le mal Track 03: Commis d'office Track 08: La faucheuse Track 12: Bâtiment c	Gold
2004	Kery James	Savoir et vivre ensemble	Track 04: Malgré les épreuves (disc 2)	—
2004	Kore & Skalp	Raï'n b fever	Track 01: Bonjour la France; Track 02: Un gaou à oran (Single); Track 03: Sobri (Single); Track 04: Mon bled Track 05: Le génie Track 06: Retour aux sources Track 07: Rai'n'b fever Track 08: Reggae rai fever Track 09: J'suis pas d'ici Track 10: Just married (Single); Track 11: N tya Track 12: Madame madame Track 13: Yeppa mama Track 14: Ma leila Track 15: L'orphelin (Single); Track 16: rimitti ridim Track 17: Chabani nonda	Platinum
2004	Relic	Légendes urbaines	Track 02: Légendes urbaines Track 09: Just married (Single)	—
2004	Leslie	Mes Couleurs	Track 01: Intro; Track 02: Sobri (notre destin) (Single); Track 04: Nos colères Track 06:Le temps qui passe Track 08: Tout ces gens Track 10: Sans toi Track 11: Dice-dice; Track 12: J'accuse; Bonus: Vivons pour demain (Single)	Platinum
2004	M. Pokora	Matt Pokora	Track 02: Showbiz (Single); Track 03: Elle me contrôle (Single); Track 04: Pas sans toi (Single); Track 08: Tourne pas le dos	Platinum
2004	Street Lourd	Hall Stars	Track 12: Pour les halls Track 16: Tu peux pas	—
2004	Corneille	Live 2004	Track 04: Laissez nous vivre	Platinum
2005	Magic System	Cessa kié la vérité	Track 02: Bouger bouger Track 13: Un gaou à Oran; Track 14: Bouger bouger (remix) (Single)	Platinum
2005	Protection Rapprochée	Protège-toi	Track 01: Protège-toi (Single); Track 02: Protège-toi (clip version)	—
2005	Amine	Au delà des rêves	Track 01: Intro; Track 02: Ma vie (Single); Track 03: J'voulais (Single); Track 04: My girl (Single); Track 05: Finiki; Track 06: Si j'avais su que… Track 07: Femmes; Track 08: Sixième sens Track 09: Win; Track 10: Had lila Track 11: Kindir; Track 12: Le chemin Track13: Sobri (club mix) (Single); Track 14: Just married (Single); Track 15: Ronde de nuit (Single)	Platinum

Solo career since 2006
Year	Singers	Album	Track	Certification
2007	Soprano	Puisqu'il faut vivre	Track 15: ferme les yeux et imagine toi (Single)	Platinum
2007	Tony Parker	TP or Tony Parker	Track 01: Intro; Track 02: Balance-toi (Single); Track 03: On dit quoi Track 04: Premier love (Single); Track 05: La famille Track 06: Bienvenue dans le Texas (Single); Track 07: Les clefs de la réussite Track 08: L'effet papillon (Single); Track 10: Génération motivée Track 11: Gametime	—
2007	Don Choa	Jungle de béton	Track 07: Voiture bélier Track 14: Demain j't'appelle	—
2007	Rim'K	Famille nombreuse	Track 07: Clandestino (Single)	Gold
2008	Psy4 De La Rime	Les cités d'or	Track 02: Les Cités d'Or (Single)	Gold
2009	AP	Discret	Track 07: Je suis libre (Single)	—
2009	Rim'k	Maghreb United	Track 02: Celebration (Single) track 09: Pour elles track 17: Celebration remix	Gold
2009	Vitaa	Celle que je vois	Track 01: Invitaation; Track 02: Pour que tu reste (Single); Track 09: Voir le monde d'en haut Track 11: Je m'attends au pire Track 12: Mes actes manqués	—
2010	Admiral T	Instinct Admiral	Track 03: Viser la victoire (Single)	—
2010	Nessbeal	NE2S	Track 14: Poussière d'empire (Single)	—
2010	Soprano	La colombe	Track 03: Darwa (Single); Track 05: Hiro (Single); Track 07: Chateau de sable (Single); Track 11: Je serais là	2 × Platinum
2010	L'Algérino	Effet Miroir	Track 07: Marseille by Night (Single); Track 08: Generation No Limit	Gold
2010	113	Universel	Track 09: On va décoller Track 12: Bledi; Track 13: A l'ancienne	Gold
2011	Magic System	Touté Kalé	Track 04: Chérie Coco (feat. Soprano)(Single); Track 10: La danse des magiciens Track 10: Children of Africa	Diamond
2011	Mokobé	Africa Forever	Track 02: Oulala (feat. DJ Arafat)(Single)	—
2011	L'Algérino	C'est Correct	Track 06: Rue de la Vie (Single); Track 08: Bayna; Track 09: Quoi de 9 Track 10: Classi (feat Kader Japonais) (Single)	Gold
2012	Youssoupha	Noir D****	Track 05: Histoires Vraies (feat Corneille) (Single); Track 13: Dreamin' (feat Indila)	Gold
