= Pardonne-moi =

Pardonne-moi (French "excuse me") may refer to:

== Music ==
=== Albums ===
- Pardonne-moi si je t'aime, album by Ima (singer)

=== Songs ===
- "Pardonne-moi", song by Nana Mouskouri, written by Alain Goraguer and Claude Lemesle, reissued on Greatest Hits, 2004
- "Pardonne-moi" (Mylène Farmer song), written by Mylène Farmer and Laurent Boutonnat, 2001
- "Pardonne-moi", song by Les Sultans, written by Bruce Huard of Les Sultans, 1966
- "Pardonne-moi", song by Jürgen Drews produced by Giorgio Moroder, 1970
- "Pardonne-moi", song and single by Gilles Valiquette, written by Gilles Valiquette, 1975
- "Pardonne-moi", song Patrick Fiori from Patrick Fiori, 2002
- "Pardonne-moi", song by Rickwel, produced by Skalp
- "Pardonne-moi", song by Grégory Lemarchal from album Je deviens moi (2005), and live album Olympia 06
- "Pardonne-moi", song by Pierre Gage from Changer le monde, 2008
- "Pardonne-moi", song by French Gothic metal band Markize from Transparence (album), 2007
- "Pardonne-moi", song by Mika Mendes from Mika Mendes, 2008
- "Pardonne-moi ce caprice d'enfant", song by Mireille Mathieu, written by Patricia Carli, 1970
