= Le droit de rêver =

Studio album by Tal
- Released: 19 March 2012
- Recorded: 2011
- Genre: Dance-pop
- Label: Warner Music France

Tal chronology
Le droit de rêver (2012)	À l'infini (2013)

Singles from Le droit de rêver
- 1. "On avance" Released: 1 July 2011; 2. "Waya Waya (feat. Sean Paul)" Released: 18 October 2011; 3. "Le sens de la vie" Released: 30 January 2012; 4. "Je prends le large" Released: 29 May 2012; 5. "Rien n'est parfait" Released: 1 October 2012

Le droit de rêver is the debut album by French singer-songwriter Tal released by Warner Music France. The album debuted at #7 in the SNEP official French Albums Chart before eventually peaking at #5 and reached #24 in the Belgian French Wallonia Album Charts.

Three singles were released from the album, first "On avance" that reached #29 in France and #44 in Belgium, followed by "Waya Waya" featuring Sean Paul, and the biggest hit "Le sens de la vie" that reached #4 in France and #3 in the French Belgian charts.

Besides the Sean Paul cooperation, there is a second version of "Le sens de la vie" featuring French-Algerian urban artist L'Algérino.

== Track list ==
1. "On avance" (3:00)
2. "Waya Waya" (feat. Sean Paul) (2:30)
3. "Le sens de la vie" (3:28)
4. "Oublie" (3:33)
5. "Rien n'est parfait" (3:06)
6. "Le droit de rêver" (2:41)
7. "Je prends le large" (2:58)
8. "Renaître" (3:23)
9. "Allez, laisse-toi aller" (3:00)
10. "Au-delà" (3:04)
11. "Toutes les femmes" (3:27)
12. "La liberté" (3:07)
13. "Le sens de la vie" (feat. L'Algérino) (3:47) (Bonus track)

== Charts ==
=== Weekly charts ===
Chart (2012–2013)	Peak position
Belgian Albums (Ultratop Wallonia)	12
French Albums (SNEP)	4
Swiss Albums (Schweizer Hitparade)	76

=== Year-end charts ===
Chart (2012)	Position
Belgian Albums (Ultratop Wallonia)	32
French Albums (SNEP)	13

Chart (2013)	Position
Belgian Albums (Ultratop Wallonia)	68
French Albums (SNEP)	21

== Certifications ==
Region	Certification	Certified units/sales
France (SNEP)	3× Platinum	300,000^{*}
^{*} Sales figures based on certification alone.
