= Les Menottes (Tching Tchang Tchong) =

Single by L'Algérino

from the album International
- Language: French
- Released: May 5, 2017
- Recorded: 2017
- Studio: Marseille, France
- Genre: French hip hop, pop
- Length: 2:56
- Songwriter(s): Zak Cosmos; L'Algérino
- Producer(s): Zak Cosmos

L'Algérino singles chronology
"Les Menottes (Tching Tchang Tchong)" (2017)	"Va Bene" (2018)

Music video
- "Les Menottes (Tching Tchang Tchong)" on YouTube

"Les Menottes (Tching Tchang Tchong)" is a song written and performed by Algerian and French rapper L'Algérino. The song was recorded in 2017 in Marseille, France, and released on May 5, 2017.

== Music video ==
The song was released on YouTube on May 5, 2017 and was filmed in Marseille.

== Charts ==
Chart (2019)	Peak position
France (SNEP)	26

== Certifications ==
Region	Certification	Certified units/sales
France (SNEP)	Platinum	133,333^{‡}
^{‡} Sales+streaming figures based on certification alone.
