= Le sens de la vie =

2012 single by Tal

Single by Tal

from the album Le droit de rêver
- Released: 30 January 2012
- Recorded: 2011
- Genre: Pop
- Length: 3:32
- Label: Warner Music France
- Songwriters: Laëtitia Vanhove (lyrics); Serge Mounier (lyrics); Laura Marciano (music); Simon Caby (music)
- Producer: Eau de Gammes

Tal singles chronology
"Waya Waya" (2011)	"Le sens de la vie" (2012)	"Je prends le large" (2012)

Music video
- "Le sens de la vie" on YouTube

"Le sens de la vie" (English: "The meaning of life") is a song by the French singer-songwriter Tal. The lyrics were written by Laetitia Vanhove and Serge Mounier and music composed by Laura Marciano and Simon Caby. The song was produced by Eau de Gammes.

It was initially recorded for Tal's debut album Le droit de rêver, which was released in March 2012. It was released in France as a single in January 2012, the third from the album after the singles "On avance" and "Waya Waya," the latter featuring Sean Paul. Contrary to the first two releases, "Le sens de la vie" became a top-ten hit for her reaching #4 in the SNEP French Singles Chart and #3 in the Belgian Ultratop Wallonia Francophone Singles Chart.

The album Le droit de rêver also contains a second very popular version of the same song in collaboration with the French-Algerian artist L'Algérino with added rap lyrics performed by L'Algérino.

== Music video ==
The music video released on January 30 2012 is set in New York City, in the United States. and shows an aspiring artist trying her dance moves with three dancers who encourage her to persevere. Other scenes show Tal jogging in Manhattan or display New York's streets, the subway system and the city's skyline.

The music video was directed by Reynald Cappuro with executive producers Frederic Alenda and in New York Michael Owen. The video was produced by Suburb Films, Paris.

Choreography was by Alonzo "Zo" Williams and dancers Cochise Quinoses Jr and Camelo Cruz.

== Version featuring L'Algérino ==
"Le sens de la vie"

Single by Tal featuring L'Algérino

from the album Le droit de rêver
- Released: 2012
- Recorded: 2011
- Genre: Pop
- Length: 3:47 (feat. l'Algérino)
- Label: Warner Music France
- Songwriters: Laëtitia Vanhove (lyrics); Serge Mounier (lyrics); Laura Marciano (music); Simon Caby (music)
- Producer: Eau de Gammes

L'Algérino singles chronology
"Avec le sourire" (2011)	"Le sens de la vie featuring L'Algérino" (2012)	"Humeur d'un soir" (2014)

Music video
- Tal feat. Algérino - "Le sens de la vie" on YouTube

A version featuring L'Algérino with the latter rapping and singing his encouraging remarks towards Tal as an aspiring artist has also become popular and became a separate single in its own right. The version originally appeared as bonus track on the album Le droit de rêver. The version charted in December 2012 in France months after the solo single by Tal. The version reached number 96 in the SNEP French Singles Chart.

A separate video was also released that takes some scenes from the original video but includes L'Algérino's rap / singing parts as well.

== Charts ==
Charting of original Tal solo version

Chart (2012)	Peak position
Belgian Singles Chart (Wallonia)	1
SNEP French Singles Chart	4

Charting of version featuring L'Algérino

Besides the solo Tal version that reached number 1 in France and number 1 in Belgium, the Syndicat National de l'Édition Phonographique SNEP Official French Singles Chart started quoting a separate recording featuring L'Algérino charting separately in France in a later release.

The recording featuring L'Algérino originally appeared as a bonus track the Tal album Le droit de rêver and has been enjoying great popularity after the separate music video released.
