= Premier Love =

Single by Tony Parker featuring Rickwel

from the album TP
- Released: October 2007
- Recorded: 2007
- Genre: crunk
- Length: 3:32
- Label: Music One
- Songwriter(s): Skalp, Eloquence, Tony Parker

Tony Parker featuring Rickwel singles chronology
"Balance-toi" (2007)	"Premier Love" (2007)

"Premier Love" is a 2007 song recorded by NBA player Tony Parker. It was the singer's second single from his eponymous album TP as a follow-up to "Balance-toi", a big success and a chart -topping single for Parker in France. "Premier Love" is a bilingual song in French and English and the English parts are performed by the featured artist Rickwel. It was released in October 2007, Written by Eloquence and Tony Parker, it was produced by French producer and DJ Skalp.

== Charts ==
Chart (2007)	Peak position
French SNEP Singles Chart	11
