= Tal (singer) =

French-Israeli singer

TALOULA
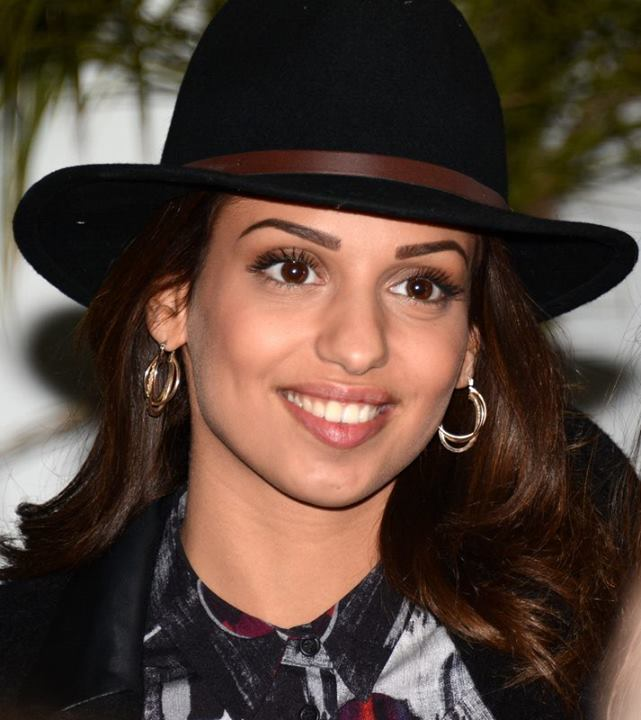
- Tal during the NRJ Music Awards in December 2013

Background information
- Also known as: TAL
- Born: Tal Benyezri; 12 December 1989 (age 36); Hadera, Israel
- Origin: Paris, France
- Genres: Pop; R&B
- Occupations: Singer; musician
- Instruments: Vocals; guitar
- Years active: 2009–present
- Label: Warner Music France

Tal Benyezri (born 12 December 1989), also mononymously known as TAL, is an Israeli-French singer. She was signed to Warner Music France from 2011 to 2018. In 2021, she changed her artist name to TALOULA and became an independent artist.

== Biography ==
Tal Benyezri was born in Hadera, Israel. Her family immigrated to Paris (France) before her first birthday. Her name means "morning dew" in Hebrew. She was born into a musical home. Her father was a guitar player, her mother a professional singer under the name Sem Azar. Her brother is a songwriter, her aunt Ronit is a world music/percussionist singer in Miami and her cousin Mor is a jazz singer in New-York.

Her mom was pregnant on stage with her. Tal therefore believes she was singing before she was born. At the age of 12, Tal began to play piano and guitar as a self-taught and enrolled in hip-hop dance lessons and modern jazz for five years. She also took part in a theater group called Compagnie Les Sales Gosses until her 16 years old. At 19 years old, she started playing in piano bars in her town Paris, making interpretations of classics soul and R&B songs.

At 19, Tal met a songwriter and producer Laura Marciano, who signed her to Sony Music for 2 years. She released one single "La musique est mon ange". in 2011, Tal signed with Warner Music France and released her debut album Le droit de rêver with pop melodies, urban rhythm and at times classical arrangements. Collaborations included Sean Paul in "Waya Waya" mixed by Veronica Ferraro, L'Algérino in a remake "Le sens de la vie" and John Hanes as sound engineer.

Her first single from the album was "On avance" which reached No. 29 in SNEP, the official French singles chart. That was followed by "Waya Waya". Her biggest hit was "Le sens de la vie" from the album. It reached No. 4 in the French charts. The album also contains a bonus version of the song featuring French-Algerian L'Algérino as a bonus track.

Tal remains involved in charity. She was the spokesman for MTV's campaign for support of the French AIDS charity Sidaction.

She has been a member of the Les Enfoirés charity ensemble since 2013.

== Discography ==
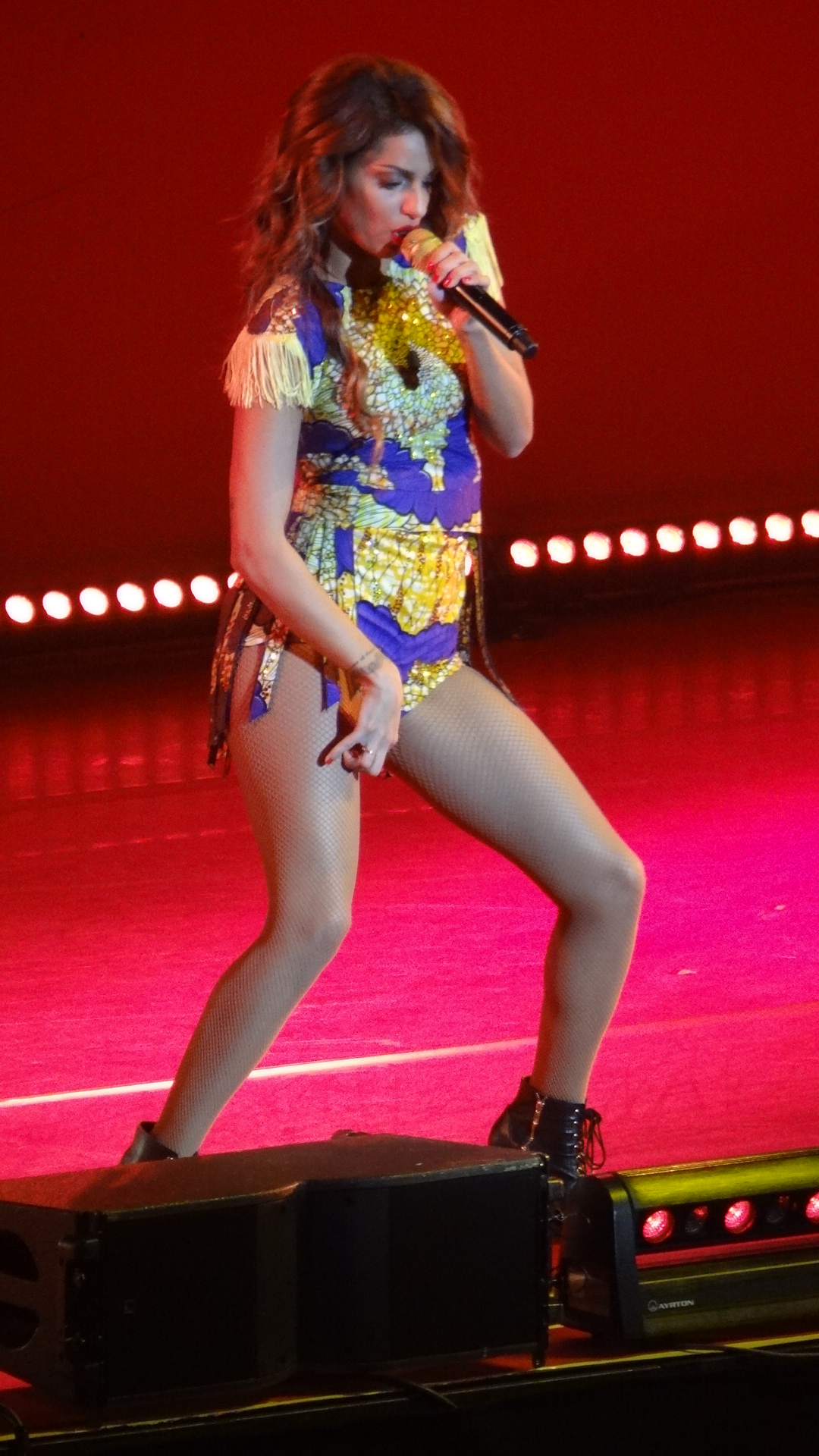
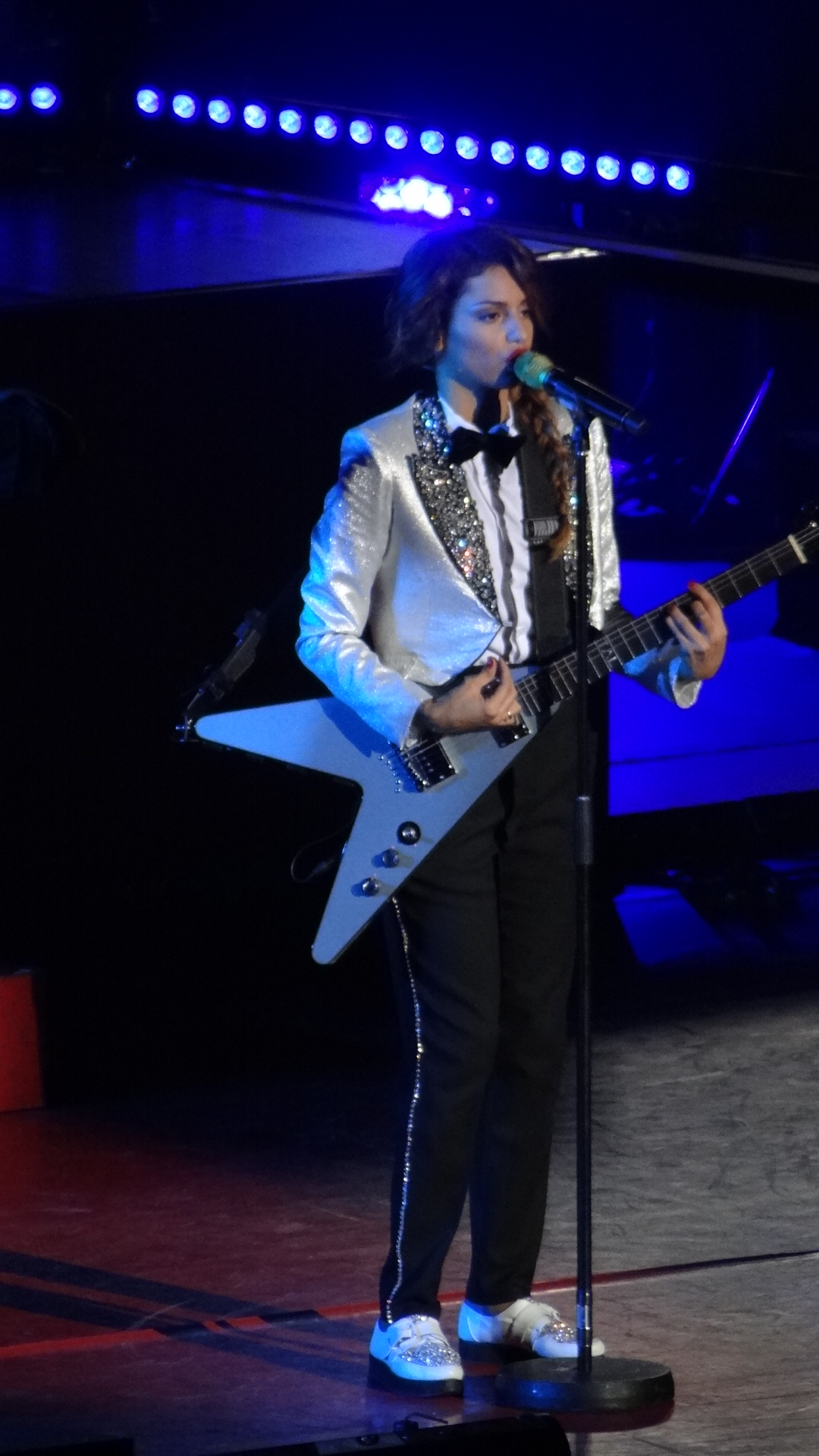
Tal performing in 2014

=== Albums ===
Studio albums

| Year | Album | Peak positions | | | Certifications |
| Year | Album | FRA | BEL | SWI | Certifications |
|---|---|---|---|---|---|
| 2011 | Le droit de rêver | 4 | 12 | 76 | SNEP: 3× Platinum |
| 2013 | À l'infini | 3 | 4 | 45 | SNEP: 3× Platinum |
| 2016 | Tal | 4 | 11 | 53 | SNEP: Platinum |
| 2018 | Juste un rêve | 2 | 12 | 33 | |

Live albums

| Year | Album | Peak positions | | Certifications |
| Year | Album | FRA | BEL | Certifications |
|---|---|---|---|---|
| 2014 | À l'infini Live Tour | 11 | 36 | SNEP: Platinum |

=== Singles ===
| Year | Single | Peak positions | | | Album |
| Year | Single | FRA | BEL | SWI | Album |
|---|---|---|---|---|---|
| 2010 | "La musique est mon ange" | – | – | – | Non-album release |
| 2011 | "On avance" | 29 | 41 | – | Le droit de rêver |
| 2011 | "Waya Waya" (feat. Sean Paul) | 72 | 65 | – | Le droit de rêver |
| 2012 | "Le sens de la vie" | 4 | 1 | – | Le droit de rêver |
| 2012 | "Je prends le large" | 39 | 44 | – | Le droit de rêver |
| 2012 | "Envole-moi" (M. Pokora and Tal) | 5 | 7 | 39 | Génération Goldman |
| 2012 | "Rien n'est parfait" | 22 | 27 | – | Le droit de rêver |
| 2013 | "Danse" (feat. Flo Rida) | 33 | 29 | – | À l'Infini |
| 2013 | "À l'International" | 24 | 46 | – | À l'Infini |
| 2013 | "Pas toi" | 39 | 59 | – | À l'Infini |
| 2013 | "Le passé" | 32 | 35 | – | À l'Infini |
| 2014 | "Maintenant ou jamais" (feat. Dry) | 79 | 58 | – | À l'Infini |
| 2014 | "Marcher au soleil" | 124 | 56 | – | À l'Infini |
| 2016 | "Are We Awake" | 38 | 38 | – | Tal |
| 2016 | "Le temps qu'il faut" | 34 | 47 | – | Tal |
| 2016 | "Back in Time" | – | – | – | Tal |
| 2016 | "Ma Famille" (feat. Fetty Wap) | – | – | – | Tal |
| 2017 | "Des fleurs et des flammes" | – | – | – | Tal |
| 2017 | "D.A.O.W (Dance All Over the World)" | – | – | – | Tal |
| 2017 | "Slow Down the Flow" | 126 | – | – | Tal |
| 2018 | "Mondial" | 19 | – | – | Juste un rêve |
| 2018 | "Juste un rêve" | – | – | – | Juste un rêve |
| 2018 | "ADN" | 142 | – | – | Juste un rêve |
"—" denotes single that did not chart or was not released in that territory.

Other releases

- 2012: "Le sens de la vie" (Tal featuring L'Algérino) (charting separately from the solo version in France)

Featured in

| Year | Single | Peak positions | | Album |
| Year | Single | BEL | FRA | Album |
|---|---|---|---|---|
| 2012 | "On a le droit de rêve" (Black Kent feat. Tal) | – | – | Black Kent's album Vendeur de rêves |
| 2012 | "M'en aller" (Canardo feat. Tal) | 46 | 12 | Canardo's album A la youv |

2014 - Une autre person with Little Mix (Salute album, deluxe edition for France).

== Awards and nominations ==
- In January 2013, she was nominated for "Francophone revelation of the Year" at the NRJ Music Awards.
- In December 2013, 2014, 2016, and 2017 she won "Francophone Female Artist of the Year" at the NRJ Music Awards.
