= Balance-toi =

Single by Tony Parker

from the album TP
- Released: 2007
- Recorded: 2007
- Genre: crunk
- Length: 4:30
- Label: Music One
- Songwriters: Skalp, Eloquence, Tony Parker

Tony Parker singles chronology
| "Balance-toi" (2007) | "Premier Love" (2007) |

"Balance-toi" is a 2007 song recorded by NBA player Tony Parker. It was written and composed by Skalp, Eloquence, and Tony Parker, and served as the debut single from his eponymous album. The song was released on 26 March 2007 and achieved success in France.

== Background ==
The song is produced by Skalp, a member of the French producer duo Kore & Skalp. Tony Parker was the first artist to sign with the newly established record label Music One, a record label from French TV station TF1.

In the music video, Parker's former wife Eva Longoria can be seen.

== Chart performances ==
The song had heavy airplay rotation on French radio stations such as NRJ and Skyrock.

In France, the single debuted at number one on May 5, 2007, with sales exceeding 10,000 units in its first week. In the following weeks, the single gradually descended on the charts, accumulating four weeks in the top ten, eleven weeks in the top 50, and a total of twenty-one weeks on the chart.

== Track listings ==
- CD single
1. "Balance-toi" (radio edit) — 3:36
2. "Balance-toi" (remix club extended by Skalp) — 4:38
3. "Balance-toi" (radio edit/instrumental) — 3:32
- CD single - Promo
1. "Balance-toi" (radio edit) — 3:36
- Digital download
1. "Balance-toi" (radio edit) — 3:36
2. "Balance-toi" (remix club extended by Skalp) — 4:38
3. "Balance-toi" (radio edit/instrumental) — 3:32

== Charts ==
=== Peak positions ===
| Chart (2007) | Peak position |
|---|---|
| Belgian (Wallonia) Utratip Chart | 4 |
| Eurochart Hot 100 | 7 |
| French Digital Chart | 10 |
| French SNEP Singles Chart | 1 |

=== End of year charts ===
| End of year chart (2007) | Position |
|---|---|
| French Airplay Chart | 197 |
| French Club Chart | 39 |
| French Singles Chart | 52 |
