= Tony Parker =

French basketball player (born 1982)

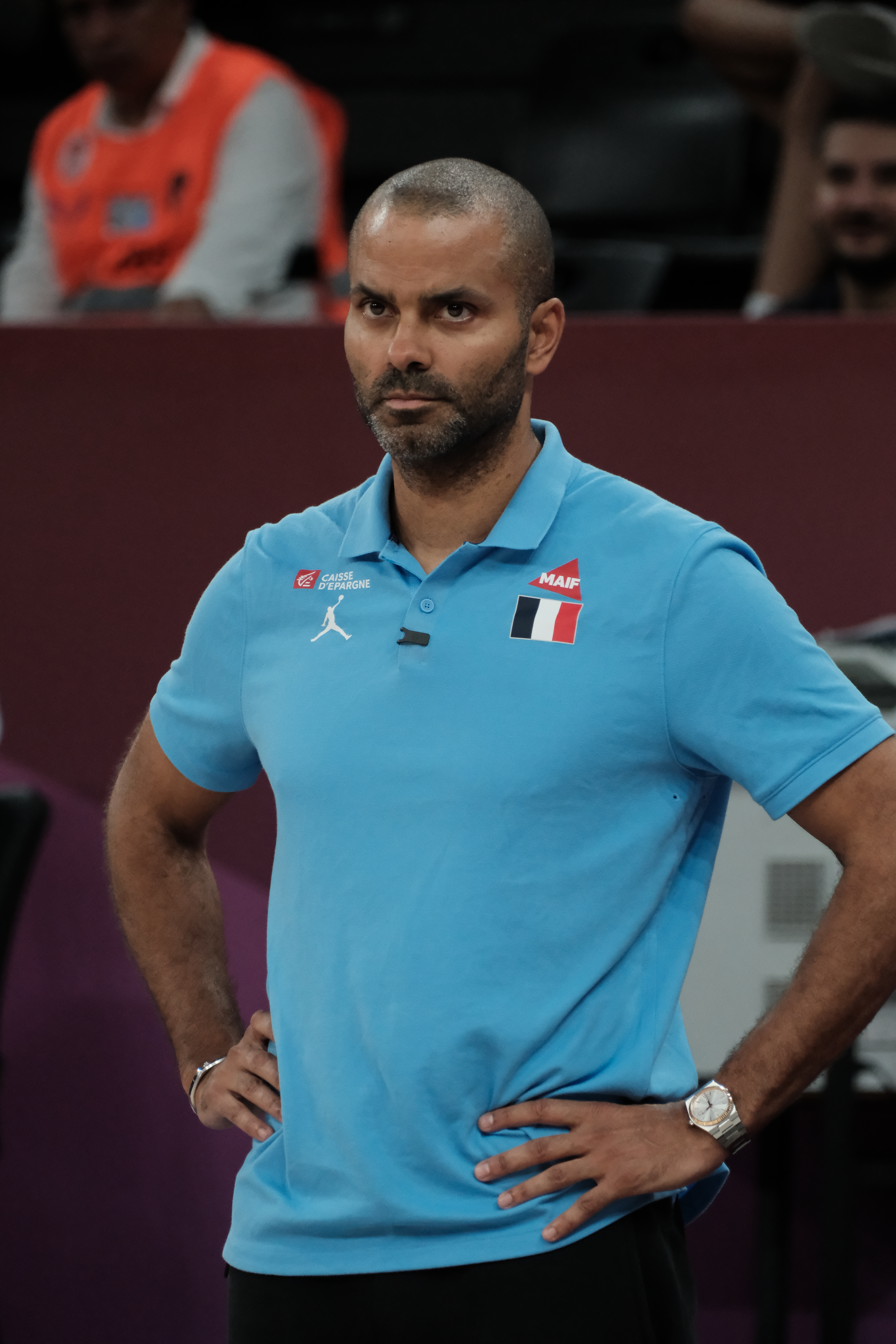
- Parker in 2026

LDLC ASVEL
- Title: Head coach
- League: LNB Élite; EuroLeague

Personal information
- Born: May 17, 1982 (age 44) Bruges, Belgium
- Listed height: 6 ft 2 in (1.88 m)
- Listed weight: 185 lb (84 kg)

Career information
- High school: INSEP (Paris, France)
- NBA draft: 2001: 1st round, 28th overall pick
- Drafted by: San Antonio Spurs
- Playing career: 1999–2019
- Position: Point guard
- Number: 9
- Coaching career: 2026–present

Career history

Playing
- 1999–2001: PSG-Racing Basket
- 2001–2018: San Antonio Spurs
- 2011: ASVEL
- 2018–2019: Charlotte Hornets

Career highlights
- As player: 4× NBA champion (2003, 2005, 2007, 2014); NBA Finals MVP (2007); 6× NBA All-Star (2006, 2007, 2009, 2012–2014); 3× All-NBA Second Team (2012–2014); All-NBA Third Team (2009); NBA All-Rookie First Team (2002); No. 9 retired by San Antonio Spurs; FIBA EuroBasket MVP (2013); 2× FIBA EuroBasket Top Scorer (2011, 2013); 2× FIBA Europe Player of the Year (2013, 2014); 2× Euroscar Award (2007, 2013); 2× L'Équipe Champion of Champions (2003, 2013); LNB All-Star (2001); LNB Pro A Most Improved Player (2001); Pro A Best Young Player (2001); No. 9 retired by France national team (2024)

Career NBA statistics
- Points: 19,473 (15.5 ppg)
- Rebounds: 3,396 (2.7 rpg)
- Assists: 7,036 (5.6 apg)
- Stats at NBA.com
- Stats at Basketball Reference
- Basketball Hall of Fame
Medals
Men's basketball
Representing France
FIBA Stankovic World Cup
Bronze medal – third place	2006 China
FIBA EuroBasket
Gold medal – first place	2013 Slovenia
Silver medal – second place	2011 Lithuania
Bronze medal – third place	2005 Serbia & Montenegro
Bronze medal – third place	2015 France–Croatia–Germany–Latvia
FIBA U-18 EuroBasket
Gold medal – first place	2000 Croatia	U-18 Team

William Anthony Parker Jr. (born May 17, 1982) is a French-American professional basketball coach and former player who currently serves as the head coach of LDLC ASVEL of the French LNB Élite and the EuroLeague. The son of a basketball pro, Parker started his career at PSG-Racing Basket in the French basketball league before joining the San Antonio Spurs of the National Basketball Association (NBA). He was selected by the Spurs with the 28th overall pick in the 2001 NBA draft, and quickly became their starting point guard as a member of the team's Big Three along with Tim Duncan and Manu Ginóbili. Parker won four NBA championships (2003, 2005, 2007, and 2014), all of which were with the Spurs. He also played for ASVEL Basket in France during the 2011 NBA lockout, and finished his playing career after one season with the Charlotte Hornets. He retired as the ninth leading scorer and ranks fifth in career assists in NBA playoffs history.

Parker was named to six NBA All-Star games, three All-NBA Second Teams, an All-NBA Third Team and was named MVP of the 2007 NBA Finals. He was also a member of the All-Rookie First Team and had his No. 9 retired by the Spurs. He is regarded as one of the greatest European players of all time. He is also regarded as a key figure in the Spurs success throughout the 2000s and most of the 2010s. On 13 August 2023, Parker was inducted into the Naismith Memorial Basketball Hall of Fame.

While playing with the France national team, Parker was named the MVP of EuroBasket 2013, following his team's victory over Lithuania in the finals. He finished as the tournament's top scorer, with an average of 19 points per game. In 2015, he became the all-time leading scorer in the EuroBasket competition, a record that was broken by Pau Gasol two years later.

== Early life ==
Parker was born on May 17, 1982, in Bruges, Belgium, and raised in France. His father, Tony Parker Sr., an African American, played basketball at Loyola University Chicago as well as professionally in the Netherlands, Belgium, and France. His mother, Pamela Firestone, is a model of Dutch, German, English and Irish origin. His maternal grandmother, Jetty Baars-Wienese, is a Dutch national tennis champion (1956), whose brother and Tony's great-uncle Jan Wienese is an Olympic gold medalist in rowing. Parker enjoyed close relationships with his brothers, and they would often attend their father's basketball games together. At first, Parker was more interested in soccer, but after watching the evolution of Michael Jordan into a global basketball superstar during summer trips to his father's native city of Chicago, he changed his mind. Parker's two younger brothers were also heavily involved in basketball; T.J. and Pierre would go on to play basketball at college and professional levels. As Parker built his skill, he played the point guard position, recognizing that his speed and agility made this position ideal for him. At age 15, he became a naturalized French citizen while retaining his American nationality. He was eventually asked to attend the INSEP National Institute of Sport, Expertise, and Performance (Institut national du sport, de l'expertise et de la performance) in Paris.

== Professional basketball career ==
=== Paris Basket Racing (1999–2001) ===
After playing in the French amateur leagues for two seasons, Parker turned professional and signed with Paris Basket Racing in 1999 at age 17. In the summer of 2000, Parker was invited to the Nike Hoop Summit in Indianapolis. In a contest between the American and European All-Stars, Parker recorded 20 points, seven assists, four rebounds and two steals. His performance prompted a recruiting war among several colleges, including UCLA and Georgia Tech. Parker decided to forgo the NCAA and to remain in France; he spent the next year with Paris Basket Racing in the French League before entering the 2001 NBA draft.

=== San Antonio Spurs (2001–2011) ===
==== First championship (2002–2003) ====
"...[When] we gave [Tony Parker] his first workout, we didn't think he was tough enough – and we sent him home. And then we set up another interview, another workout... and he was fantastic in that one."

— Gregg Popovich, after the 2007 championship

Before the 2001 NBA draft, Parker was invited to the San Antonio Spurs' summer camp. Coach Gregg Popovich had him play against Spurs scout and ex-NBA player Lance Blanks. Parker was overwhelmed by Blanks's tough and physical defense, and Popovich was ready to send him away after just 10 minutes. But after seeing a "best of" mix tape of Parker's best plays, Popovich decided to invite Parker a second time. This time, Parker made a better impression against Blanks; the Frenchman later described Blanks as a "one-man wrecking crew". But while Popovich decided that Parker was worth the gamble, the Spurs still had to hope that other teams would not pick Parker during the draft. Parker's name was barely mentioned in the pre-draft predictions, and the point guard was drafted 28th overall by the Spurs on draft day.

After initially playing backup to Antonio Daniels, Parker became a starter and made 77 regular-season appearances in his rookie season, averaging 9.2 points, 4.3 assists and 2.6 rebounds in 29.4 minutes per game. When he played against the Los Angeles Clippers on 30 October 2001, he became the third French player to play in an NBA game, after Tariq Abdul-Wahad and Jérôme Moïso. By the end of the season, the rookie led San Antonio in assists and steals, and was named to the All-Rookie First Team for 2001–02, becoming the first foreign-born guard to earn the honor.

In 2002–03, Parker played in all 82 regular-season games as San Antonio's starting point guard on a team that was largely revamped from previous years. He improved his regular season statistics, averaging 15.5 points per game (ppg), 5.3 assists per game (apg) and 2.6 rebounds per game (rpg). Parker's role as the team's playmaker was reflected in his leading the team in assists on 49 occasions. During the 2003 NBA All-Star Weekend, Parker represented the Sophomores in the Rookie Challenge, and also participated in the inaugural Skills Challenge. In the post season, the Spurs, led by Tim Duncan, defeated the New Jersey Nets 4–2 in the finals, and Parker earned his first NBA championship ring. Despite the victory, Parker struggled with inconsistent play throughout the playoffs, and was often benched in favor of more experienced guards Steve Kerr and Speedy Claxton late in the games.

==== Second championship (2003–2005) ====
Despite winning a championship with the Spurs, doubts lingered over Parker's future. The Spurs had attempted and failed to acquire New Jersey Nets' Jason Kidd, but Parker told coach Popovich that he wanted to be San Antonio's starting point guard. Parker played well during the regular season, recording 14.7 ppg, 5.5 apg and 3.2 rpg. However, the Spurs were defeated by the Los Angeles Lakers in the Western Conference semi-finals in the 2004 NBA Playoffs, and were denied back-to-back titles.

Prior to the start of the 2004–05 season, Parker signed a six-year, $66 million contract extension through the 2010–11 season. On the year, he would once again record improved regular season statistics, tallying 16.6 ppg, 6.1 apg and a career-high 3.7 rpg. He was also ranked 13th in the league in total assists, and was third among point guards in field goal percentage. The Spurs were strong in the playoffs, and Parker was instrumental in the victories over the Denver Nuggets, Seattle SuperSonics and Phoenix Suns. However, Parker struggled in the Finals series against the Detroit Pistons. Spurs colleagues Manu Ginóbili and Brent Barry often took over playmaking duties as Parker was unable to perform as well as he did in the regular season. Nevertheless, the Spurs won their third-ever NBA championship by defeating the defending champions 4–3 in the 2005 NBA Finals.

"He told me, 'Coach, I'll play in the NBA and, one day, France will recognize me as a great player'. It's incredible how, at 18 years old, he could have such confidence. I thought he could play in the NBA, but not that he would become a player of the importance he is today."

— Claude Bergeaud, who coached Parker on the French junior team

==== Third championship (2005–2007) ====
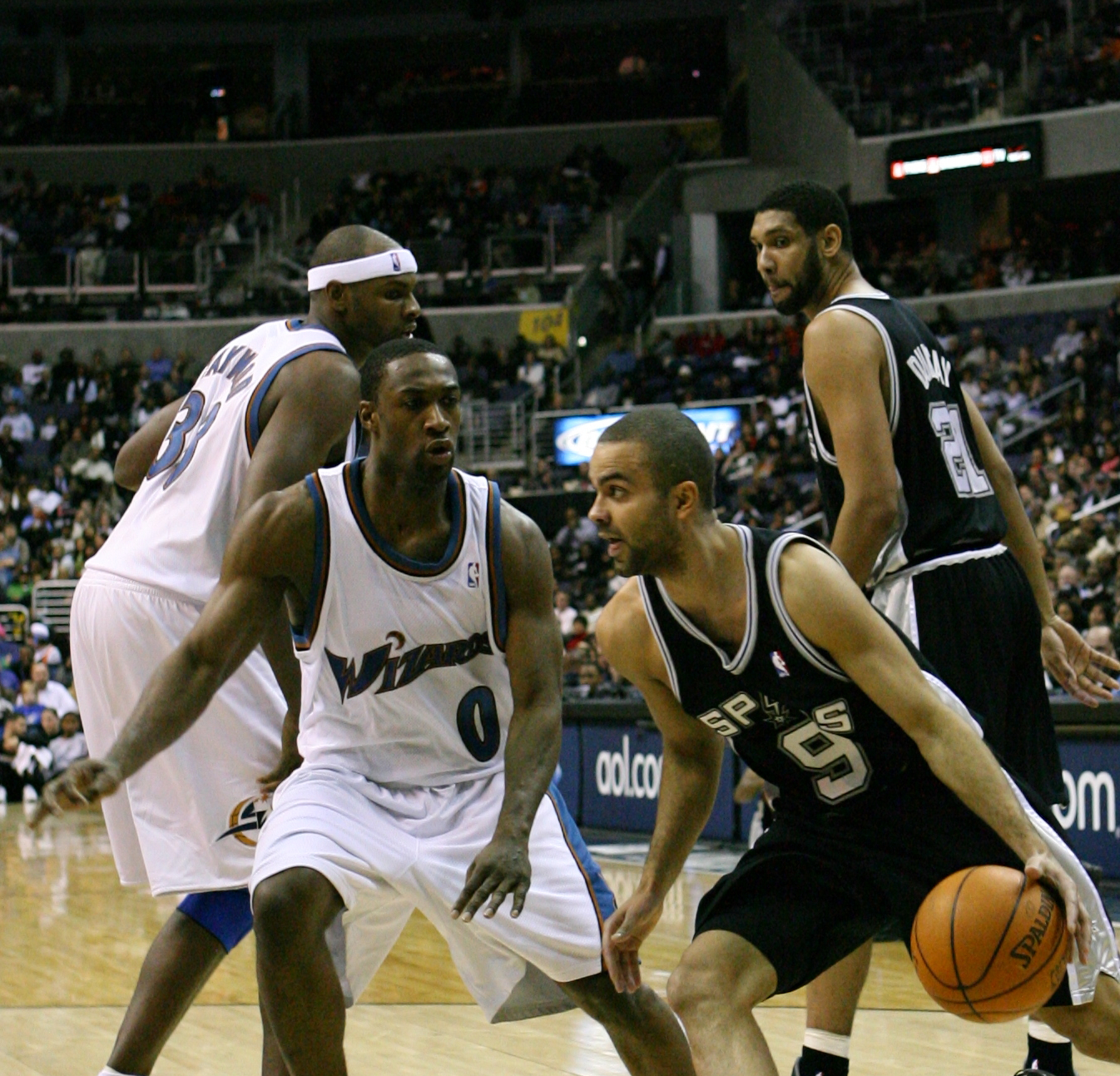
Parker in a 2007–08 game against Washington Wizards' Gilbert Arenas

Parker was selected for the first time in his career an NBA All-Star for the 2005–06 season as he managed 18.9 ppg and an impressive .548 in field goal percentage. Parker's scoring average was even higher than Duncan's, and his form propelled the Spurs to a 63–19 win–loss record and qualification for the 2006 NBA Playoffs. However, the top-seeded Spurs were again unable to win back-to-back titles as they were eliminated in the second round by the Dallas Mavericks.

On 14 February 2007, after delivering consistent numbers in the first half of the 2006–07 season, Parker was selected to play in the 2007 NBA All-Star Game as a reserve guard. With Parker operating as the starting point guard in the 2006–07 season, the Spurs qualified for the 2007 NBA Playoffs and finished second in the Southwest Division. In the Western Conference Semifinals, the Spurs met the Phoenix Suns led by two-time and reigning NBA MVP Steve Nash. After eliminating the Suns, the Spurs defeated the Utah Jazz 4–1 to win the Western Conference Finals. Parker and the Spurs went on to face the Cleveland Cavaliers and swept them 4–0 to win the 2007 NBA Finals. In this series, Parker consistently outplayed his Cavaliers counterparts Daniel Gibson and All-Defensive Team member Larry Hughes and scored a series-high 24.5 points, accompanied by a high field goal percentage of 56.8% and of 57.1% from three-point range. For his performances, he was named the 2007 NBA Finals MVP, becoming the first European-born player to receive the award.

==== Falling short and injury (2007–2011) ====
"When there is talk about the best point guards, sometimes they don't talk about me. But that's not my main motivation. They can talk about Jason Kidd, Steve Nash, Deron Williams and Chris Paul. I still have the most rings."

— Tony Parker

In the 2007–08 regular season, Parker recorded similar averages as the previous two seasons for points and rebounds, and slightly increased his assists per game average. The Spurs finished third in the Western Conference and faced the Phoenix Suns in the first round of the 2008 NBA Playoffs. For the third time in four years, San Antonio prevailed over Phoenix; Parker had an outstanding first-round series, averaging nearly 30 points and 7 assists a game. In the next round against Chris Paul's New Orleans Hornets, the Spurs dropped the first two road games before responding with a strong win in the third game. In that game, Parker recorded a double-double with 31 points and 11 assists. The experienced Spurs took seven games to defeat the Hornets, but were unable to get past the Los Angeles Lakers in the Conference Finals, and the Spurs once again failed to win back-to-back NBA championships.

San Antonio got off to a rocky start in their 2008–09 NBA season, losing the first three contests. In their fourth game against the Minnesota Timberwolves, however, Parker scored a career-high 55 points to lead the Spurs to their first victory of the campaign. The Spurs recovered soon enough, and approached the All-Star break ranked second in the Conference. With Parker averaging a career-high in points per game, he was named as a reserve for the 2009 All-Star game. The Spurs were without influential shooting guard Ginóbili for much for the season, and greater responsibility fell on Parker's shoulders. He helped lead the team to a 54–28 record and the third seed for the playoffs, In Game 4 of the first round against Dallas, Parker matched George Gervin's franchise playoff record for points in a half with 31. However, the Spurs eventually lost 4–1, bowing out of the playoffs in the first round for the first time since 2000. Parker's 28.6 points and 4.2 rebounds per game broke his previous playoffs career-best averages of 22.4 points and 3.7 rebounds. On 13 May 2009, he was named to the All-NBA Third Team.

With the Spurs looking to provide a more solid supporting cast in the 2009–10 season, they acquired Richard Jefferson, Theo Ratliff, Antonio McDyess, DeJuan Blair, and Keith Bogans. Parker injured his hand during the season and missed 26 games. The Spurs qualified for the playoffs as the seventh seed, and defeated Dallas 4–2 in the first round, only to lose 4–0 to Phoenix in the next round.

Going into the final season of his contract, Parker would sign a four-year, $50 million extension at the start of the 2010–11 season, keeping him in San Antonio through the 2014–15 season. To start the season, the Spurs compiled a 12-game winning streak to go 13–2 after 15 games. The Spurs were 29–4 after 33 games—one of the ten best starts in NBA history–and led the league at 35–6 halfway through the season. Parker and the Spurs finished the regular season with a 61-21 record; despite being the first seed in the Western Conference, they were eliminated 4-2 in the first round by the eight-seeded Memphis Grizzlies.

=== ASVEL (2011) ===
During the 2011 NBA lockout, Parker signed with ASVEL, the French basketball team in which he owns a stake. Parker's salary was about $2,000 a month. He was quoted as saying, "I'll be playing nearly for free." He also paid his own insurance, which reportedly cost $250,000 for three months.

=== Return to San Antonio (2011–2018) ===
==== Best record in the NBA and finals upsets (2011–2013) ====
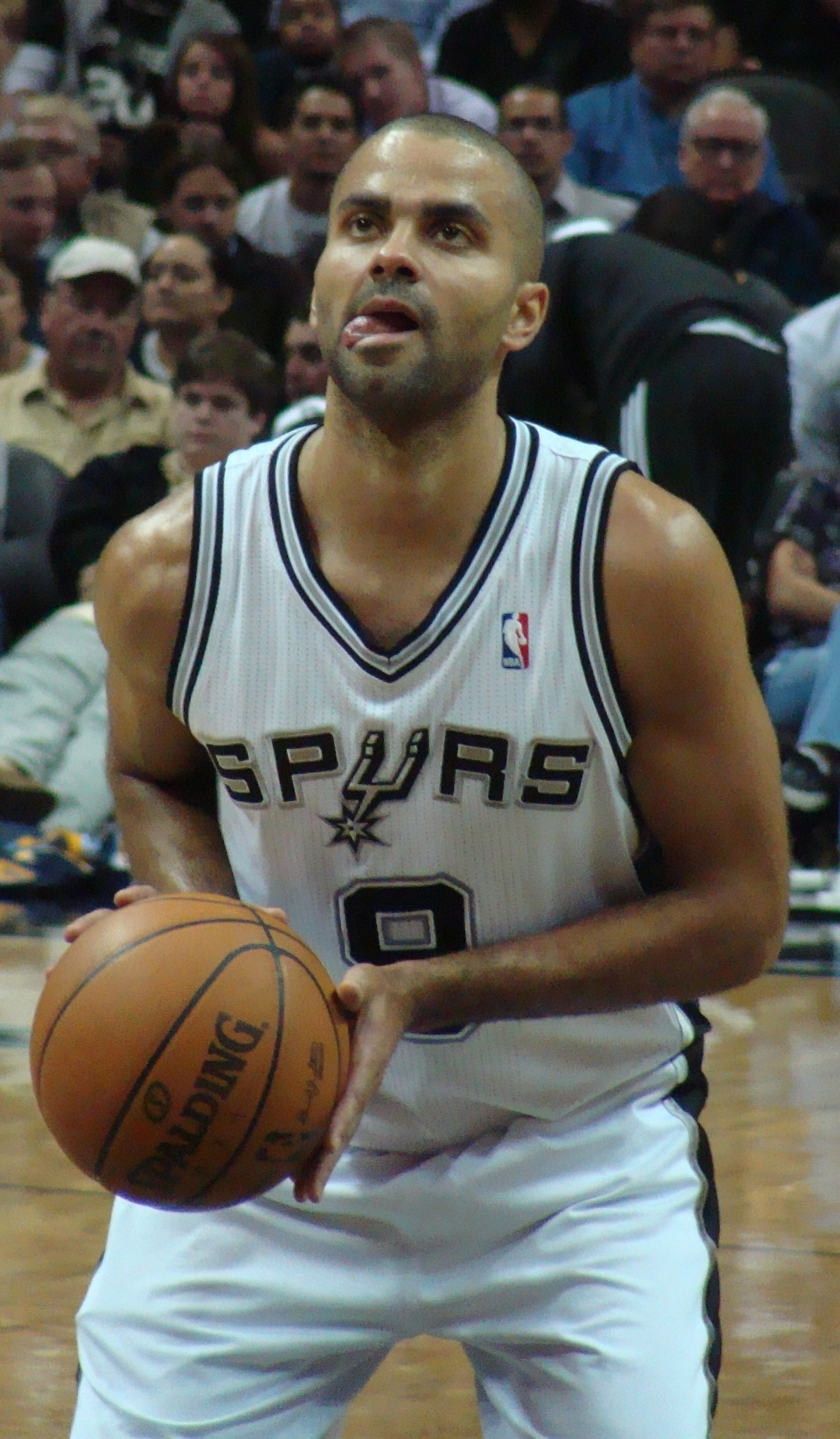
Parker attempts a free throw in a game against the Denver Nuggets in December 2010

During the 2011–12 NBA season, Parker helped the Spurs reach the best record in the West for the second straight season; the team tied the Chicago Bulls for the best overall record in the league. It was the Spurs 13th straight 50 win season (a new NBA record) despite the lockout-shortened season. On 4 February 2012, Parker became the all-time assist leader of the franchise with 4,477, surpassing Avery Johnson, adding 42 points in a victory against Oklahoma City Thunder. Parker received his fourth All-Star nod and finished fifth in MVP award voting, receiving four first-place votes.

In the 2012 NBA Playoffs, the Spurs swept their first two opponents, the Utah Jazz and Los Angeles Clippers, to reach the Western Conference Finals against the Oklahoma City Thunder. After taking a 2-0 series lead, the Spurs lost four consecutive games, thus losing the series in 6 games. Over the three playoff series, Parker averaged 20.1 points and 6.8 assists per game.

In their second game of the 2012–13 season, the Spurs faced the Thunder in a rematch of the previous Western Conference Finals; Parker hit a game-winning jumper as time expired to secure a 86-84 win for the Spurs. On 10 December 2012, Parker got his first career triple-double after 825 regular-season games against the Houston Rockets in overtime with 27 points, 12 rebounds, and 12 assists. He was the 4th player in NBA history to have gone 800 games or more into their career before their first triple-double, joining Karl Malone (860), Patrick Ewing (834), and Cedric Maxwell (824). At the end of January, Parker was named Western Conference NBA Player of the Month. During the month, he led the Spurs to a 12-3 record (the best record in the NBA), averaged 21.9 points and 7.9 assists per game, and shot 56.3% from the field. Parker was the first Spurs player to receive the honor since Tim Duncan in April 2002.

During the 2013 Western Conference Finals against the Grizzlies, Parker recorded a career-high 18 assists along with 15 points in the Spurs' game 2 victory. In game 4, Parker finished with a game-high 37 points as the Spurs swept the Grizzlies to advance to the NBA finals again the defending champion Miami Heat. In game 1 of the finals, Parker hit a clutch jump shot off the glass with 5.2 seconds remaining in the game, securing a 92–88 victory for San Antonio. The Spurs eventually lost the series in seven games.

==== Fourth championship (2013–2014) ====
During the 2014 season, Parker was named an All-Star, his sixth selection. He averaged 16.7 points and 5.7 assists per game over the season, his fourth consecutive year leading the Spurs in scoring. On 19 May 2014, following a win against the Oklahoma City Thunder, Parker and his teammates Manu Ginóbili and Tim Duncan tied the record for most wins in NBA playoff history by a trio of players playing together. The record was previously held by the Los Angeles Lakers trio of Magic Johnson, Kareem Abdul-Jabbar and Michael Cooper at 110 wins. The Spurs went on to beat the Thunder in six games and advance to the finals, facing the Miami Heat for the second straight year. San Antonio won in five games, giving Parker his fourth championship.

==== Final years with Spurs (2014–2018) ====
On 1 August 2014, Parker signed a three-year, $43.3 million contract extension with the Spurs. The Spurs finished the 2014–15 season with a 55–27 record, good for the 6 seed in the Western Conference, and faced the Los Angeles Clippers in the first round. Parker suffered multiple injuries during the series, including a quadriceps bruise, tweaked left ankle, and a tight right Achilles tendon which forced him to leave game 2 early. In game 7, Parker led his team with 20 points, but opposing point guard Chris Paul scored a game-winner to eliminate the Spurs from the playoffs.

During the 2015–16 season, Parker helped the Spurs win a franchise-best 67 games, although they were the second seed behind the 73 win Golden State Warriors. The Spurs swept the Memphis Grizzlies in the first round, but were eliminated in the second round by the Oklahoma City Thunder in six games. Following the season, Parker's longtime teammate Tim Duncan announced his retirement. This marked the end of the Big Three of Parker, Duncan, and Manu Ginóbili, who hold the record for the most regular season and playoff wins by a trio of teammates.

In the 2016–17 season, the Spurs finished with a 61–21 record, as they registered back-to-back 60-win seasons for the first time in franchise history. During the 2017 playoffs, the Spurs defeated the Memphis Grizzlies 4-2 in the first round, with Parker averaging 16.3 points per game. During game 2 of the second round against the Houston Rockets, Parker ruptured his left quadriceps tendon, ending his season. Game 3 was San Antonio's first postseason game without Parker since 2001, ending his NBA record 221 straight playoff appearances with the Spurs. The injury required surgery, with some media speculating it could lead Parker to retire.

Parker returned from injury on 27 November 2017 in a win over the Dallas Mavericks. Parker had six points and four assists in 14 minutes, saying after the game it felt "a little bit like my first game when I was rookie". In his 17th and final season with the Spurs, Parker played 55 games and averaged a career-low 7.7 points a game. The Spurs faced the Golden State Warriors in the first round of the playoffs and were eliminated in five games.

On 11 November 2019, the Spurs retired Parker's No. 9 jersey. Parker is considered the Spurs' greatest point guard and left as the franchise's assist leader with 6,829.

=== Charlotte Hornets (2018–2019) ===
On 23 July 2018, Parker signed a two-year, $10 million contract with the Charlotte Hornets. He made his debut as a Hornets player on 17 October 2018, recording 8 points on 4/8 shooting, 7 assists, and 3 rebounds while coming off of the bench in 19 minutes of action in a 113–112 loss to the Milwaukee Bucks. The Hornets finished the season with a 39-43 record, missing the playoffs.

On 10 June 2019, Parker announced his retirement from the NBA. He ended his career ranked fifth in career playoff assists (1,143) and ninth in career playoff scoring (4,045).

== National team career ==
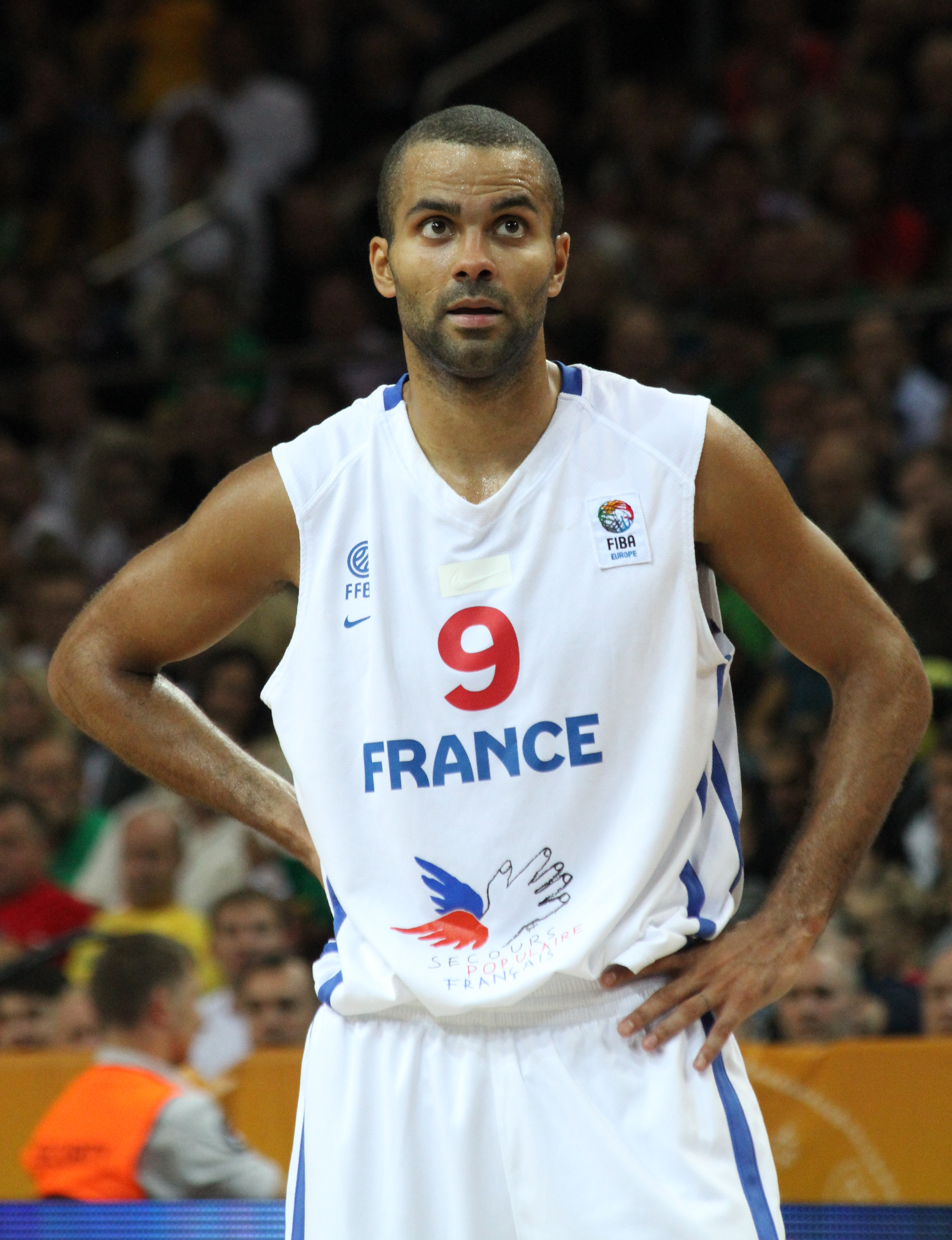
Parker playing for France in 2011

Parker played for France's Junior National Teams at the 1997 FIBA Europe Under-16 Championship, both the 1998 FIBA Europe Under-18 Championship and the 2000 FIBA Europe Under-18 Championship, and the 2002 FIBA Europe Under-20 Championship. He was elected the Most Valuable Player of the 2000 FIBA Europe Under-18 Championship, when France captured the gold medal, as he averaged 14.4 points and 2.5 assists per game. Parker averaged 25.8 points, 6.8 assists, and 6.8 steals per game at the 2002 FIBA Europe Under-20 Championship. With the French senior national team, Parker has played in the 2001, 2003, 2005, 2007, 2009, 2011 2013 and 2015 FIBA EuroBaskets.

France won the bronze medal in the 2005 FIBA EuroBasket, by defeating the Spanish national team 98–68 in the bronze medal game. As the captain of the French national team since 2003, Parker was slated to lead France at the 2006 FIBA World Championship, but he was unable to play after breaking a finger when he caught his hand in the jersey of a Brazilian national team player in France's final warm-up for the tournament. During the EuroBasket 2007, Parker averaged 20.1 points per game and 2.8 assists per game in nine tournament games, but France was defeated in the quarter-finals by the Russian national team. He passed the 2010 FIBA World Championship to recover fully from some injuries he had during the 2009–10 NBA season. Parker returned to the team in 2011, and France reached the finals of the 2011 EuroBasket, losing to Spain. Parker also joined the team for the 2012 Summer Olympics in London. In 2013, Parker and the French national team won the 2013 FIBA EuroBasket tournament. While Parker had a "quiet game" in the final with only 12 points, he was named the MVP for the tournament.

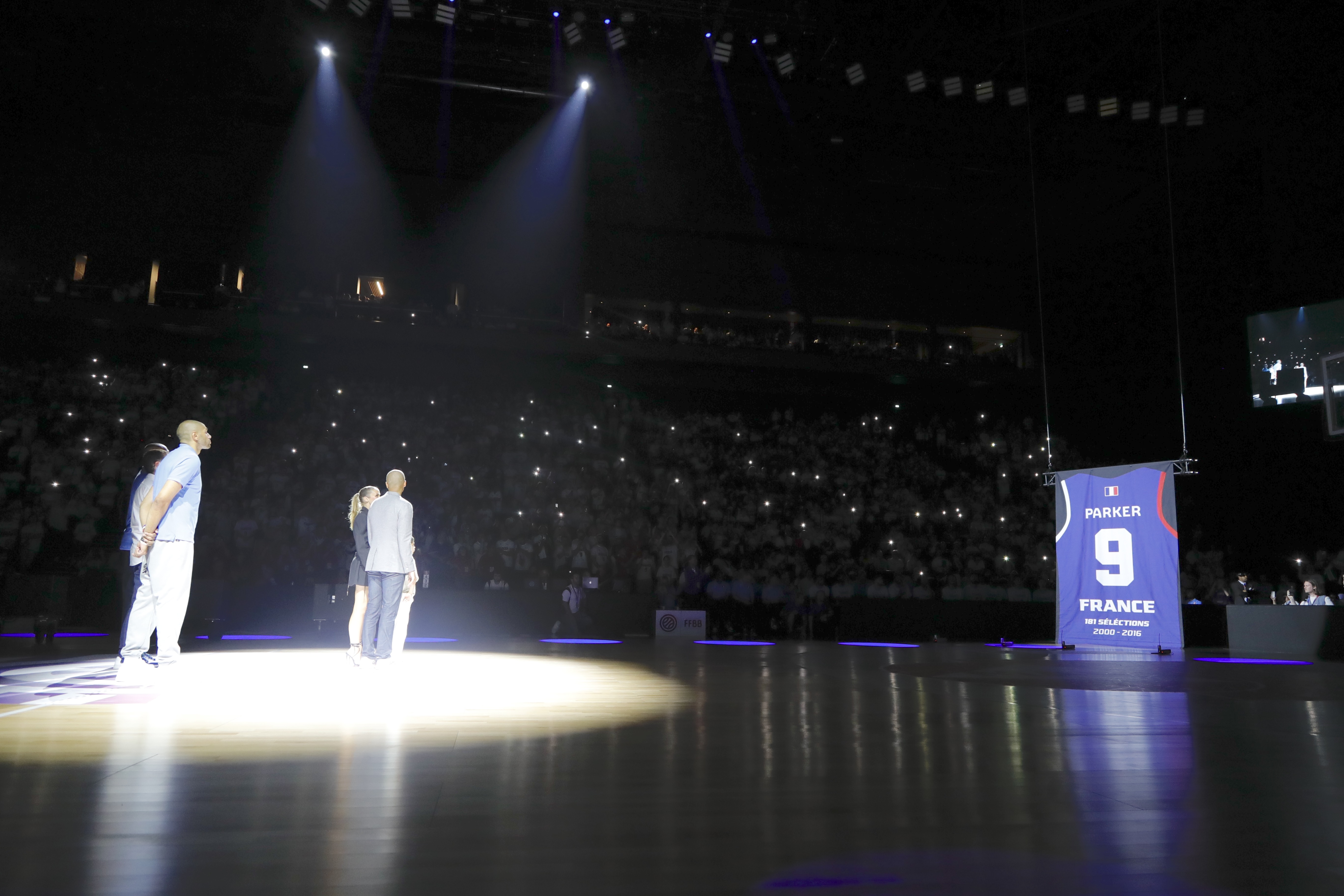
Parker's national team No.9 jersey being retired

While playing for France in EuroBasket 2015, in a group game against Poland, Parker scored his 1,032nd career point in the tournament, and in doing so, he overtook Nikos Galis as the all-time leading scorer in the history of the EuroBasket competition. That record was later broken by Pau Gasol.

During the Olympic Qualifying Tournament in Manila, Philippines, in July 2016, Parker announced his intention to retire from international competition, but not the NBA, after the 2016 Summer Olympics. He reiterated that intent after France lost in the quarter-finals in Rio de Janeiro.

On 12 July 2024, the French Federation of Basketball officially retired Parker's national team jersey number 9, ahead of a friendly game against Serbia at the LDLC Arena in Lyon. Retiring a number for a player is not a French tradition, thus, his number retirement was the first of such kind in any French sport.

== Player profile ==
Standing at 6 feet 2 inches tall (1.88 m) and weighing 185 pounds (84 kg), Parker played at the point guard position and established himself as a potent offensive player. He was voted by his peers in a 2007 poll as one of the quickest players in the NBA. Parker often slashed to the basket for layups, and the teardrop was considered his "signature shot". Despite his relatively small size for a basketball player, he led the league in "points in the paint" for the 2005–06 season.

In the initial part of his NBA career, Parker was considered an erratic shooter off the ball. During the 2005 offseason, Coach Popovich decided to work on that aspect of his play. Spurs shooting coach Chip Engelland forbade Parker to shoot any three-point shots and corrected his shooting motion and his thumb position. As a result, by the 2006–07 season, Parker's accuracy rose by 4% (field goals and three-point shots). He was also able to connect on 78% of his free throws that season.

Parker developed tendinitis in his knees early in his career.

== Honors ==
- Team honors
  - NBA champion: 2003, 2005, 2007, 2014
- Individual honors
  - NBA Finals MVP: 2007
  - NBA All-Star: 2006, 2007, 2009, 2012, 2013, 2014
  - All-NBA Second Team: 2012, 2013, 2014
  - All-NBA Third Team: 2009
  - NBA All-Rookie First Team: 2002
  - NBA Skills Challenge champion: 2012
  - All-Time NBA European First Team: 2022
  - All-time leader in assists for San Antonio
  - Member of the 2006 San Antonio All-Star Shooting Stars team. He sealed the victory by making the half-court shot on his first attempt, setting an All-Star Shooting Star record time of 25.1 seconds. He was joined on the team by retired Spur Steve Kerr, and Kendra Wecker from the San Antonio Silver Stars of the WNBA.
  - NBA Western Conference Player of the Month for the month of January 2013; first Spurs player to receive the honor since Tim Duncan in April 2002.
- Junior national team
  - 2000 FIBA Europe Under-18 Championship Gold and MVP
- Senior national team
  - EuroBasket 2013 Gold, MVP and Top Scorer
  - EuroBasket 2011 Silver and Top Scorer
  - EuroBasket 2005 Bronze
  - EuroBasket 2015 Bronze
- Other honors
  - L'Équipe Champion of Champions: 2003, 2013
  - Inducted into the Legion of Honor with the rank of Chevalier: 2007
  - Euroscar: 2007, 2013
  - All-Europeans Player of the Year: 2013, 2014
  - FIBA Europe Player of the Year Award: 2013, 2014
  - On the cover of NBA Live 09

== Career statistics ==
Legend
GP	Games played	GS	Games started	MPG	Minutes per game
FG%	Field goal percentage	3P%	3-point field goal percentage	FT%	Free throw percentage
RPG	Rebounds per game	APG	Assists per game	SPG	Steals per game
BPG	Blocks per game	PPG	Points per game	**Bold**	Career high
†	Won an NBA championship	*	Led the league

=== NBA ===
==== Regular season ====
Year	Team	GP	GS	MPG	FG%	3P%	FT%	RPG	APG	SPG	BPG	PPG
2001–02	San Antonio	77	72	29.4	.419	.323	.675	2.6	4.3	**1.2**	.1	9.2
2002–03†	San Antonio	**82**	**82***	33.8	.464	.337	.755	2.6	5.3	.9	.1	15.5
2003–04	San Antonio	75	75	**34.4**	.447	.312	.702	3.2	5.5	.8	.0	14.7
2004–05†	San Antonio	80	80	34.2	.482	.276	.650	**3.7**	6.1	**1.2**	.1	16.6
2005–06	San Antonio	80	80	33.9	**.548**	.306	.707	3.3	5.8	1.0	.1	18.9
2006–07†	San Antonio	77	77	32.5	.520	.395	.783	3.2	5.5	1.1	.1	18.6
2007–08	San Antonio	69	68	33.5	.494	.258	.715	3.2	6.0	.8	.1	18.8
2008–09	San Antonio	72	71	34.1	.506	.292	.782	3.1	6.9	.9	.1	**22.0**
2009–10	San Antonio	56	50	30.9	.487	.294	.756	2.4	5.7	.5	.1	16.0
2010–11	San Antonio	78	78	32.4	.519	.357	.769	3.1	6.6	**1.2**	.0	17.5
2011–12	San Antonio	60	60	32.0	.480	.230	.799	2.9	**7.7**	1.0	.1	18.3
2012–13	San Antonio	66	66	32.9	.522	.353	**.845**	3.0	7.6	.8	.1	20.3
2013–14†	San Antonio	68	68	29.4	.499	.373	.811	2.3	5.7	.5	.1	16.7
2014–15	San Antonio	68	68	28.7	.486	**.427**	.783	1.9	4.9	.6	.0	14.4
2015–16	San Antonio	72	72	27.5	.493	.415	.760	2.4	5.3	.8	**.2**	11.9
2016–17	San Antonio	63	63	25.2	.466	.333	.726	1.8	4.5	.5	.0	10.1
2017–18	San Antonio	55	21	19.5	.459	.270	.705	1.7	3.5	.5	.0	7.7
2018–19	Charlotte	56	0	17.9	.460	.255	.734	1.5	3.7	.4	.1	9.5
Career		1,254	1,151	30.5	.491	.324	.751	2.7	5.6	.8	.1	15.5
All-Star		6	0	18.3	.522	.167	1.000	1.8	4.7	.8	.1	8.8

==== Playoffs ====
Year	Team	GP	GS	MPG	FG%	3P%	FT%	RPG	APG	SPG	BPG	PPG
2002	San Antonio	10	10	34.1	.456	.370	.750	2.9	4.0	.9	.1	15.5
2003†	San Antonio	**24**	**24**	33.9	.403	.268	.713	2.8	3.5	.9	.1	14.7
2004	San Antonio	10	10	**38.6**	.429	.395	.657	2.1	**7.0**	**1.3**	.1	18.4
2005†	San Antonio	23	23	37.3	.454	.188	.632	2.9	4.3	.7	.1	17.2
2006	San Antonio	13	13	36.5	.460	.222	.810	3.6	3.8	1.0	.1	21.1
2007†	San Antonio	20	20	37.6	.480	.333	.679	3.4	5.8	1.1	.0	20.8
2008	San Antonio	17	17	38.5	.497	.350	.753	3.7	6.1	.9	.1	22.4
2009	San Antonio	5	5	36.2	**.546**	.214	.710	**4.2**	6.8	1.2	.2	**28.6**
2010	San Antonio	10	2	33.5	.474	**.667**	.595	3.8	5.4	.6	.0	17.3
2011	San Antonio	6	6	36.8	.462	.125	.756	2.7	5.2	**1.3**	**.3**	19.7
2012	San Antonio	14	14	36.1	.453	.333	.807	3.6	6.8	.9	.0	20.1
2013	San Antonio	21	21	36.4	.458	.355	.777	3.2	**7.0**	1.1	.1	20.6
2014†	San Antonio	23	23	31.3	.486	.371	.729	2.0	4.8	.7	.0	17.4
2015	San Antonio	7	7	30.0	.363	.000	.588	3.3	3.6	.3	.0	10.9
2016	San Antonio	10	10	26.4	.449	.250	.857	2.2	5.3	.6	.2	10.4
2017	San Antonio	8	8	26.4	.526	.579	**1.000**	2.5	3.1	.5	.0	15.9
2018	San Antonio	5	0	13.4	.378	.000	.714	.8	1.2	.4	.0	6.6
Career		226	213	34.3	.461	.309	.731	2.9	5.1	.9	.1	17.9

== Other ventures ==
In 2012, Parker and his brothers, TJ and Pierre, opened a nightclub called Nueve Lounge in San Antonio. The venue officially closed on 27 July 2013. In September 2015, Parker announced the launch of his own basketball academy in the city of Lyon.

In June 2019, Parker joined NorthRock Partners, a financial planning firm, to lead their sports, artists and entertainment division. Parker stated he was inspired by his own experience as a young athlete navigating financial matters.

In December 2019, Parker bought a 3% stake in the Tacoma, Washington-based National Women's Soccer League team then known as Reign FC and later known as OL Reign. He acquired this interest as part of a larger transaction in which OL Groupe, the parent company of prominent French football club Olympique Lyonnais, bought an 89.5% stake in the NWSL team.

=== Olympic bids ===
Parker was involved in the Paris bid for the 2012 Summer Olympics, travelling with the French delegation to the International Olympic Committee voting meeting in Singapore. After Paris lost the vote—54 to 50 in favor of London's bid—Parker critiqued the process, saying "I don't know what else we could have done. If we don't have it now, I guess we will never get it. The IOC seems to be very pro-Anglo-Saxon. I feel extremely gutted."

Parker participated in Paris' successful bid for the 2024 Summer Olympics, and was the first ambassador announced for the games after their bid won. Parker also took part in the Olympic torch relay in 2024, carrying the flame for a turn in Marseille.

=== LDLC ASVEL ===
In 2009, Parker bought a 20 percent stake in the French basketball club LDLC ASVEL, located in Lyon, and held the ceremonial title of vice president of basketball operations. During the 2011 NBA lockout, Parker signed to play for ASVEL for the French League's minimum wage until the lockout ended. In 2014, Parker became the majority shareholder and president of the team.

On 12 July 2016, Parker and his business partners published plans for the construction of a new arena in Villeurbanne, which was slated to become LDLC ASVEL's new home court. In 2017, Nicholas Batum, another NBA player and longtime teammate of Parker on the French national team, joined ASVEL as Director of Basketball Operations.

=== LDLC ASVEL Féminin ===
In March 2017, it was announced that Parker had become the majority shareholder of Lyon Basket Féminine (a member of the French women's basketball league later known as LDLC ASVEL Féminin) and that he would also take over as chairman of the club at the conclusion of the fiscal year 2016–17.

=== Philanthropy ===
During his playing career, Parker donated a block of 20 tickets for each home game to underprivileged youth. In 2006, Parker became the first ambassador for Make-A-Wish France, the French division of a non-profit organization that grants wishes to children with life-threatening medical conditions. His work with Make-A-Wish includes hosting a yearly gala with other celebrities, such as Omar Sy, to raise money for the foundation.

Parker is also known for participating in former NBA point guard Steve Nash's foundation, as well as his ex-wife Eva Longoria's NGO Eva's Heroes.

=== Movies and television ===
In 2008, Parker and Jean-Marie Antonini directed a one-hour documentary, 9 – Un chiffre, un homme (English: 9 – a number, a man) distributed by StudioCanal. The film uses archival footage of Parker's childhood, covering his early life and the first 9 years of his basketball career. The film features basketball players Kobe Bryant, Tim Duncan, Magic Johnson, Michael Jordan, Steve Nash, and Boris Diaw, as well as footballers Thierry Henry and Zinedine Zidane, and Eva Longoria. In 2021, Parker was the subject of another documentary, Tony Parker: The Final Shot, directed by Florent Bodin and released by Netflix.

Parker had a cameo appearance in the 2008 French film Asterix at the Olympic Games where his character invents the game of basketball. He has appeared as a guest on the TV series En aparté (2005) and season 4 of the Netflix series Call My Agent (2020). He has participated in the game show Fort Boyard. Parker played himself as a lead character in the animated series Baskup - Tony Parker.

=== Music ===
Parker released a French hip-hop album entitled Tony Parker (alternatively called TP) in 2007, produced by Polygrafic (Sound Scientists). The album featured collaborations with artists including Booba, Jamie Foxx, Rickwel, and Soprano. Singles from the album include:

- "Balance-toi", which features Eva Longoria. It reached the number one position in the Syndicat National de l'Édition Phonographique (SNEP), the official French singles chart.
- "Premier Love" featuring Rickwel singing English and Parker singing French. It peaked at #11 in SNEP.
- "Bienvenue dans le Texas", featuring French rapper Booba and made available via iTunes. This initial release did not chart in France.

The album received negative reviews from English and French media, with Rolling Stone later including Parker in a list of the "10 Worst Rappers in NBA History", alongside Shaquille O'Neal, Allen Iverson, and others. In 2013, Parker stated in an interview that he was retired from music.

Albums

Year	Album	Peak positions
Year	Album	France (SNEP)
2007	TP	19

Singles

Year	Single	Peak positions		Album
Year	Single	France (SNEP)	Belgium (Wallonia) (Ultratop)	Album
2007	"Balance-toi"	1	54*	TP
2007	"Premier Love" (featuring Rickwel)	11	–	TP

*Did not appear in the official Belgian Ultratop 50 charts, but rather in the bubbling under Ultratip charts where it peaked at number 4. Fifty chart positions were added to the Ultratip peak to arrive at an equivalent Ultratop position

== Personal life ==
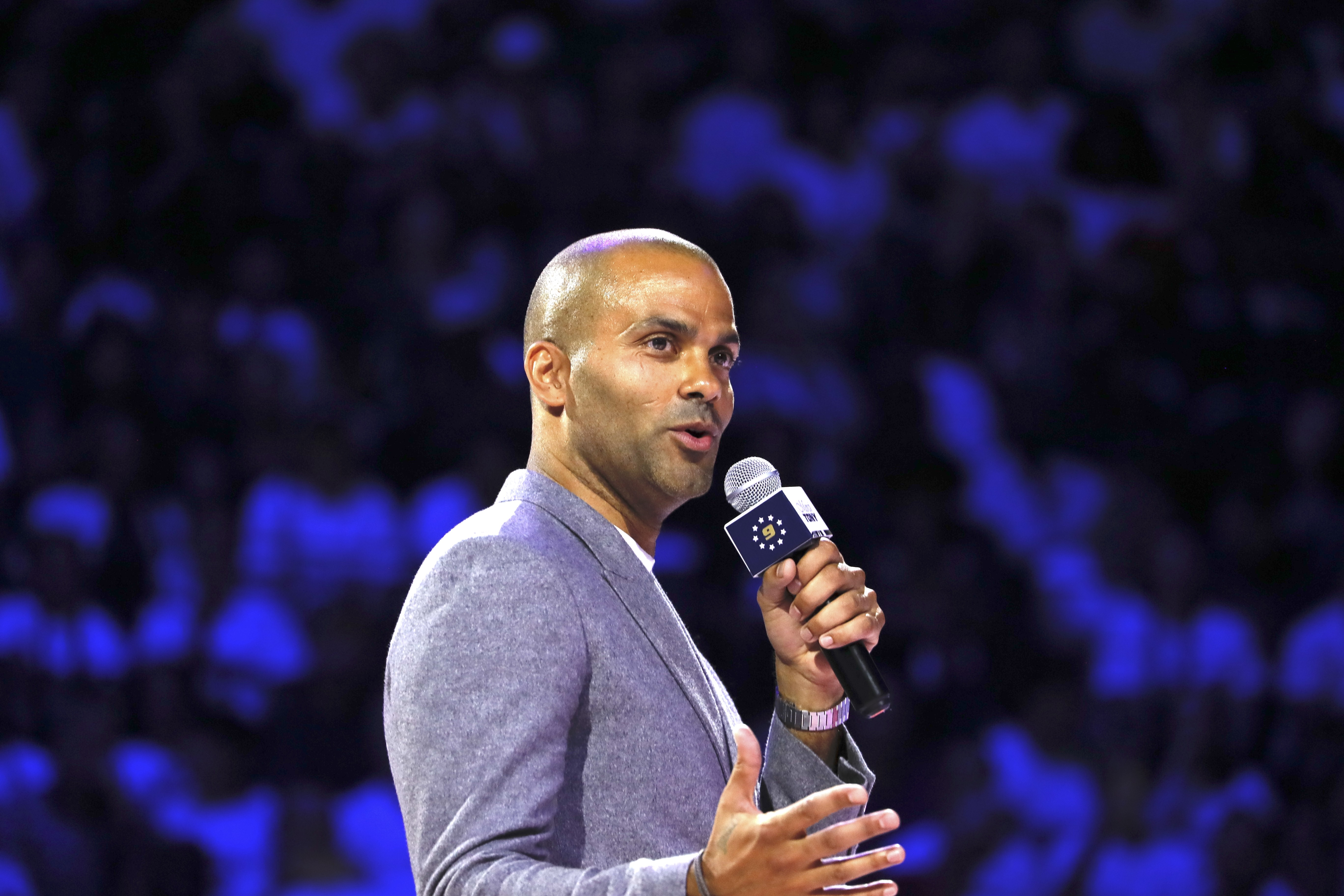
Tony Parker, for his number retirement in July 2024

Parker met American actress Eva Longoria in November 2004. In August 2005, Longoria confirmed that she and Parker were dating. On 30 November 2006, the couple became engaged. Longoria, a Texas native from nearby Corpus Christi, was a courtside regular at Spurs home games. Parker was quoted during the 2007 NBA All-Star Game saying that, "Eva is doing everything, I'm just going to show up and say yes." They were married in a civil service on 6 July 2007, at a Paris city hall. That was followed by a full Catholic wedding ceremony at the Saint-Germain l'Auxerrois Church in Paris, France, on 7 July 2007. Boris Diaw, fellow French national team member and future NBA teammate, was Parker's best man for the wedding.

On 17 November 2010, Longoria filed for divorce in Los Angeles, citing "irreconcilable differences" after Parker reportedly engaged in an emotional affair with the wife of his Spurs teammate Brent Barry.

Longoria sought spousal support from Parker. The couple had a prenuptial agreement that was signed in June 2007, the month before their wedding, and amended two years later in June 2009. Unlike Longoria's divorce petition, Parker's did not mention a prenuptial agreement and claimed that the parties "will enter into an agreement for the division of their estate". The divorce was finalized in Texas on 28 January 2011, the same day Longoria's lawyer filed papers to dismiss her Los Angeles petition.

Parker began dating French journalist Axelle Francine in 2011. In June 2013, it was reported that the couple was engaged. Parker and Axelle Francine married on 2 August 2014. They have two sons born in April 2014 and July 2016. The couple announced their separation in August 2020.

From 2021 to 2024, Parker dated French professional tennis player Alizé Lim.

=== Nightclub injury ===
Parker was injured on 14 June 2012 at the W.I.P nightclub in the SoHo district of New York City when a brawl broke out between entertainers Chris Brown and Drake. Parker filed a $20 million suit against the night club. Parker risked missing the 2012 Summer Olympics after a piece of glass thrown in the fight deeply penetrated his eye, requiring surgical removal of the glass. However, on 6 July 2012, he was cleared to participate.

== See also ==
- List of NBA career assists leaders
- List of NBA career turnovers leaders
- List of NBA career games played leaders
- List of NBA career playoff scoring leaders
- List of NBA career playoff assists leaders
- List of NBA career playoff turnovers leaders
- List of NBA career playoff games played leaders
- List of French NBA players
- List of European basketball players in the United States

Awards and achievements
Preceded by Carole Montillet	French Sportsperson of the Year; 2003	Succeeded by Laure Manaudou
Preceded by Teddy Riner	French Sportsman of the Year; 2013	Succeeded by Renaud Lavillenie
