= Dimension (K-Reen album) =

Studio album by K-Reen
- Released: October 29, 2001
- Recorded: 2000–2001
- Genre: R&B
- Length: 58:55
- Label: Tréma
- Producers: Fabou; K-Reen; Christian Lachenal; White & Spirit; Guy & Daddy Waky

K-Reen chronology
K-Reen (1998)	Dimension (2001)	Old School Elixir (2006)

Singles from Dimension
- 1. "Prends ma main" Released: 2001; 2. "Oui-Non" Released: 2002; 3. "Soirées rétro" Released: 2002

Dimension is the second album by French singer and rapper K-Reen. It was released on October 29, 2001, through Tréma Music. The album also spawned three hit singles, "Prends ma main", "Oui-Non" and "Soirées rétro".

== Track listing ==
No.	Title	Writer(s)	Producer(s)	Length
1.	"M'as-tu vu?"	K-Reen; Alaixy XXL	K-Reen	3:22
2.	"Soirée rétro"	Jarnod	Guy & Daddy Waku	3:31
3.	"Je vois les choses"	K-Reen; Sky	Max Yavonk; K-Reen	3:50
4.	"Son coeur se déchire"	Princess Erika	K-Reen	5:06
5.	"Prends ma main"	K-Reen	K-Reen	4:02
6.	"Partir ou rester?"	Jarnod; Alain Waku	Guy & Daddy Waku	3:48
7.	"7e ciel"	K-Reen; Sky	White & Spirit; K-Reen	4:01
8.	"Casanova" (featuring Diam's)	K-Reen; Diam's	Matrix; K-Reen	4:27
9.	"Marabout"	K-Reen	K-Reen; Mehdi	4:03
10.	"Tout ce qu'on veut" (featuring Jalane & China Moses)	K-Reen; Jalane; China Moses	Cut Killer	3:52
11.	"Mon seul été"	L'Aura; Stéphane Quentin	L'Aura	5:04
12.	"Permission de sortir"	K-Reen; Sky	DJ Scalp; K-Reen; DJ Kore	4:49
13.	"Oui-Non"	K-Reen; China Moses	K-Reen	3:58
14.	"Dimension"	L'Aura; Stéphane Quentin	K-Reen	4:45
Total length:				58:55

== Charts ==
Chart (1998)	Peak position
French Albums (SNEP)	113
