= Rickwel =

French R&B singer

Rickwel (born in Vitry-sur-Seine, France) is a French R&B singer of Martiniquan descent.

Born in a southeastern suburb of Paris, France, he spent his childhood in the Martinique where he keenly followed music from his early years and was a vocalist with the group One Day, a trio made up of Rickwel, his brother and a childhood friend. incorporating Caribbean music, R&B and hip hop.

Returning to France, he resided in Lyon to continue his studies in musicology. His meeting with French songwriter Tommy Djibz and French record producer and DJ Skalp in 2006 was decisive in opening up opportunities. He was featured in French NBA player Tony Parker's album in a track titled "Premier Love" that Skalp was producing for Parker. The single, the second from Parker's album TP reached number 11 in SNEP, the official French Singles Chart.

Rickwel released his own singles like "Pardonne moi" and "Danse pour moi" in addition to collaborating with a number of artists as vocalist, including La Fouine in "YouPorn" and K-Reen in "T'aimer encore".

== Discography ==
=== EPs ===
- Tout ce qu'il me faut EP (2016)

=== Singles ===
- "Pardonne-moi" (2009)
- "Danse pour moi" (2009)
- "Tout ce qu'il me faut" (2015)
- "Comment lui dire" (2016)

Featured in

Year	Single	Peak positions	Certification	Album
Year	Single	FR	Certification	Album
2007	"Premier Love" (Tony Parker feat. Rickwel)	11		Tony Parker album TP

Appearances

- "YouPorn" (with La Fouine) (2010)
- "Au bout de mes idées" (Rickwel, Gue-D'1, Green, Neskro & Teuch Ross) (2010)
- "Demain j't'appelle" (Don Choa feat. Rickwel)
