= L'Algérino =

Algerian-French rapper and singer

- Born: Samir Djoghlal; 2 May 1981 (age 45); Marseille, France
- Origin: Marseille, France
- Genres: Hip hop, raï, reggae
- Occupations: Rapper, singer
- Years active: 2004-present

Samir Djoghlal (Arabic: سمير جغلال; born 2 May 1981), better known as L'Algérino (French pronunciation: [lalʒeʁino]), is an Algerian-French rapper and singer whose family came from the Chaoui-Berber tribes in Khenchela, Algeria

A childhood friend of JUL, he was discovered in 2001 by rapper Akhenaton, a member of the IAM group, who signed him on his 361 Recordz label, and in which he published his first album " Les derniers seront les premiers" (English: The Last will be the First), in June 2005. Aged 25, L'Algérino becomes the first Marseille artist signed on an independent Paris label, the Sinik Six-O-Nine.

== Career ==
Samir Djoghlal known as 'L'Algérino' of Algerian parents, was born in 1981 in Marseille. He was introduced to rap at a very young age listening to Suprême NTM and IAM in the northern districts of Marseille. He started rapping at the age of 11 and quickly began releasing mixtapes and appearing in local concerts.

He had brief stints with groups 'B-Vice Junior' and '45 Niggaz', releasing independent albums with both of them. The work of Algérino is produced in its early days by Hichem Gombra and Hafid Fédaouche (HF Production), with whom he recorded his first maxi two titles called "T'sais c'est qui qui cause?" (English: Do You Know who's talking?), whose instrumental is composed by Soprano of Psy4 De La Rime. He officially made a name for himself when he appeared on Psy 4 de la Rime's album "Block Party".

L'Algérino was discovered in 2004 by Akhenaton, a member of the IAM group, who signs him on his label 361 Records; his first album, "Les derniers seront les premiers" (English:The Last will be the First), is distributed by Naïve Records and released in 2005. The group offers him the first parts of their concerts, with Psy4 De La Rime. During a concert in Chambéry,

L'Algérino and Sinik share the poster and meet for the first time. It is in Paris that they meet again several times and plan to move together after the departure of Sam 361 Records. Aged 25, L'Algérino became the first Marseille artist to be signed on an independent Paris label, Six-O-Nine. After relative success of his debut album, he released in 2007 album "Mentalité pirate" (English: Pirate attitude), which gained fame, through tracks like "L'envie de vaincre" (English: the desire to conquer), "Fleur fanée", (English: Faded flower) and the sentimental "Entre deux flammes" (English: Between two flames).

In March 2010, L'Algerino released his third album "Effet miroir" (English: Mirror Effect), which reaches 20th place in the French chart. The hit single "Sur la tête de ma mère" (English: On the head of my mother) became a huge popular success for the singer; the song starts as: "Saturday night, at full moon, the wolves come out of their lairs, the wolves are beautiful, dress in the most beautiful ways ..."

At the end of 2011, the rapper from Marseille released his fourth album, "C'est correct" (English: That's correct), whose single "Avec le sourire" (English: With the smile), a reggae song, goes around radios all over France; the album reaches 26th place in the French chart. "Aigle royal" (English: Royal Eagle), his next album, is released in 2014, followed by his sixth album entitled "Oriental Dream" at Black Pearl Music in October 2015. L'Algerino's seventh album "Banderas" was released in October 2016 and reached 12th place in the French chart.

In May 2017, he released his single "Les menottes (Tching Tchang Tchong)" (English: Handcuffs, Tching Tchang Tchong), which was a success, and has received over 590 million YouTube views as of June 2020.

The song "Va Bene", from the Taxi 5 soundtrack, was recorded in 2018 and released on March 23, 2018 on YouTube, where it has the song has 280 million views. It reached number 2 on the French SNEP charts.

== Discography ==
=== Albums ===
Year	Album	Charts				Record Label
Year	Album	FR	BEL (Fl)	BEL (Wa)	NED	Record Label
2005	Les derniers seront les premiers	32	–	–	–	361 Recordz
2007	Mentalité pirate	26	–	–	–	Six-O-Nine
2010	Effet miroir	20	–	–	–	Six-O-Nine
2011	C'est correct	27	–	–	–	Six-O-Nine
2014	Aigle royal	36	–	103	–	Monstre Marin Corporation
2015	Oriental Dream	24	–	90	–	Black Pearl Music/Musicast
2016	Banderas	12	–	34	–	Black Pearl Music/Musicast
2018	International	5	62	7	89	Caroline France/Only Pro
2021	Moonlight	2	–	51	–	Caroline France/Only Pro

=== Singles ===
Year	Single	Charts		Album
Year	Single	FR	BEL (Wa)	Album
2010	"Sur la tête de ma mère"	–	9* (Ultratip)	
2011	"Avec le sourire"	57	–	C'est correct
2014	"Les bronzés font du biff"	–	29* (Ultratip)	Aigle royal
2015	"Le prince de la ville"	105	–	
2016	"Banderas"	118	–	Banderas
2017	"Les Menottes (Tching Tchang Tchong)"	41	–	International
2018	"Va bene"	2	27	International
2019	"Mention Max"	131	–	TBA
2020	"La Vida" (feat. Soprano)	110	15* (Ultratip)	TBA
2020	"Moula max" (feat. Heuss L'Enfoiré)	64	–	TBA
2021	"Sapapaya" (with SCH & Jul)	7	–	non-album release

*Did not appear in the official Belgian Ultratop 50 charts, but rather in the bubbling under Ultratip charts.

=== Featured in ===
Year	Single	Charts			Album
Year	Single	FR	BEL (Wa)	SWI	Album
2012	"Le sens de la vie" (Tal feat. L'Algérino)	–	–	–	Tal album Le droit de rêver
2015	"Marrakech Saint Tropez" (Florin Salam feat. L'Algérino)	–	–	–	
2020	"L'étoile sur le maillot" (L'Algérino - Alonzo - Stone Black - Le Rat Luciano - Sch - Jul - As - Veazy)	3	48	71	13 Organisé
2020	"Je suis Marseille" (Akhenaton - Jul - L'Algérino - Alonzo - Shurik'n - Fahar - Sch - Le Rat Luciano)	12	–	–	13 Organisé
2020	"Tout a changé" (Le Rat Luciano - Soprano - Jul - L'Algérino - Sysa - Solda - Menzo - Stone Black - Fahar)	18	–	–	13 Organisé
2020	"C'est maintenant" (Sat l'Artificier - Alonzo - Kofs - Naps - Sch - Jul - Kamikaz - L'Algérino)	21	–	–	13 Organisé

=== Other songs ===
Year	Single	Charts	Album
Year	Single	FR	Album
2014	"Humeur d'un soir"	171	Aigle royal
2016	"Savastano" (featuring Alonzo)	102	Banderas
2016	"Si tu savais"	165	Banderas
2016	"Seni Seni"	167	Banderas
2018	"International"	67	International
2018	"Hola" (feat. Boef)	88	International
2018	"Les 4 fantastiques" (feat. Soprano, Naps & Alonzo)	101	International
2018	"Andale"	141	International
2018	"Adios" (feat. Soolking)	100	International
2021	"ALG 63"	125	Moonlight
2021	"On va où" (feat. Jul)	101	Moonlight
2021	"Excuse My French" (feat. Franglish)	135	Moonlight
2021	"Number One" (feat. Naza)	166	Moonlight

- 2007: "Tapage nocturne"
- 2007: "L’envie de vaincre"
- 2010: "Trinité"
- 2010: "Marseille by night"
- 2010: "Tireur de coup franc"
- 2010: "Derapage contrôlé"
- 2010: "Pas la pour leur plaire"
- 2011: "Allô Maman Bobo"
- 2011: "Bayna"
