= Bolémvn =

French rapper

Bryan Mounkala born November 29, 1996 in Mantes-la-Jolie (France) better known as Bolémvn is a French rapper and singer from Évry, Essonne, Île-de-France, France.

== Life and Career ==
He grew up in famous Bâtiment 7 in Évry where Koba LaD and Kodes also come from. After releasing two EPs and notably "Eh boy", he signed with Capitol Label Services, a big rap label. His 2020 album Vol 169 was a huge success and charted in France, Belgium and Switzerland and reached number 15 on the French Albums Chart. This was followed up with the album Anarchiste in 2021.

== Discography ==
=== Albums ===
| Year | Album | Peak positions | | | Certification |
| Year | Album | FRA | BEL (Wa) | SWI | Certification |
|---|---|---|---|---|---|
| 2018 | Quel vie | 121 | — | — | |
| 2019 | Salut les terriens | 105 | — | — | |
| 2020 | Vol 169 | 15 | 34 | 88 | |
| 2021 | Anarchiste | 37 | 62 | — | |
| 2022 | Vol 169 Atterrissage | — | 138 | — | |

=== Singles ===
| Year | Album | Peak positions | | | Album |
| Year | Album | FRA | BEL (Wa) | SWI | Album |
|---|---|---|---|---|---|
| 2018 | "Sankhara #4 (Chic)" (with Koba LaD) | 39 | Tip | — | |
| 2020 | "Prends ta monnaie" (feat. RK) | 55 | — | — | Vol 169 |
| 2020 | "10K" (with Maes) | 5 | — | 67 | Vol 169 |
| 2021 | "DM" (feat. Dinos) | 156 | — | — | |

=== Featured in ===
| Year | Album | Peak positions | Album |
| Year | Album | FRA | Album |
|---|---|---|---|
| 2018 | "Seven binks" (Koba LaD feat. Mafia Spartiate & Bolémvn) | 32 | Koba LaD album VII |
| 2018 | "Baby mama" (Joé Dwèt Filé feat. Bolémvn) | 183 | Joé Dwèt Filé album Calypso |

=== Other songs ===
| Year | Album | Peak positions | Album |
| Year | Album | FRA | Album |
|---|---|---|---|
| 2020 | "Smic" (with Koba LaD) | 193 | Vol 169 |
| 2021 | "Ça canarde" (feat. Guy2Bezbar) | 13 | Anarchiste |
