= Plus jamais =

Single by Aya Nakamura featuring Stormzy

from the album Aya
- Released: 13 November 2020
- Recorded: 2020
- Genre: R&B; hip-hop; urban pop
- Length: 2:55
- Label: Rec. 118; Parlophone; Warner Music France
- Songwriters: Heezy Lee; Timo
- Producer: Vladimir Boudnikoff

Aya Nakamura singles chronology
"Doudou" (2020)	"Plus jamais" (2020)	"Fly" (2021)

Stormzy singles chronology
"Ain't It Different" (2020)	"Plus jamais" (2020)	"Skengman" (2021)

Music video
- "Plus jamais" on YouTube

"Plus jamais" is a song by French and Malian singer Aya Nakamura featuring vocals from British rapper Stormzy. It was released as the third single from her album Aya.

== Charts ==
=== Weekly charts ===
Chart (2020–2021)	Peak position
Belgium (Ultratip Bubbling Under Flanders)	5
Belgium (Ultratop 50 Wallonia)	36
France (SNEP)	1
Global Excl. US (Billboard)	163
Switzerland (Schweizer Hitparade)	24
UK Afrobeats Singles (OCC)	8

=== Year-end charts ===
Chart (2021)	Position
France (SNEP)	101

== Certifications ==
Region	Certification	Certified units/sales
France (SNEP)	Diamond	333,333^{‡}
^{‡} Sales+streaming figures based on certification alone.
