= Oboy (rapper) =

French rapper (born 1997)

OBOY
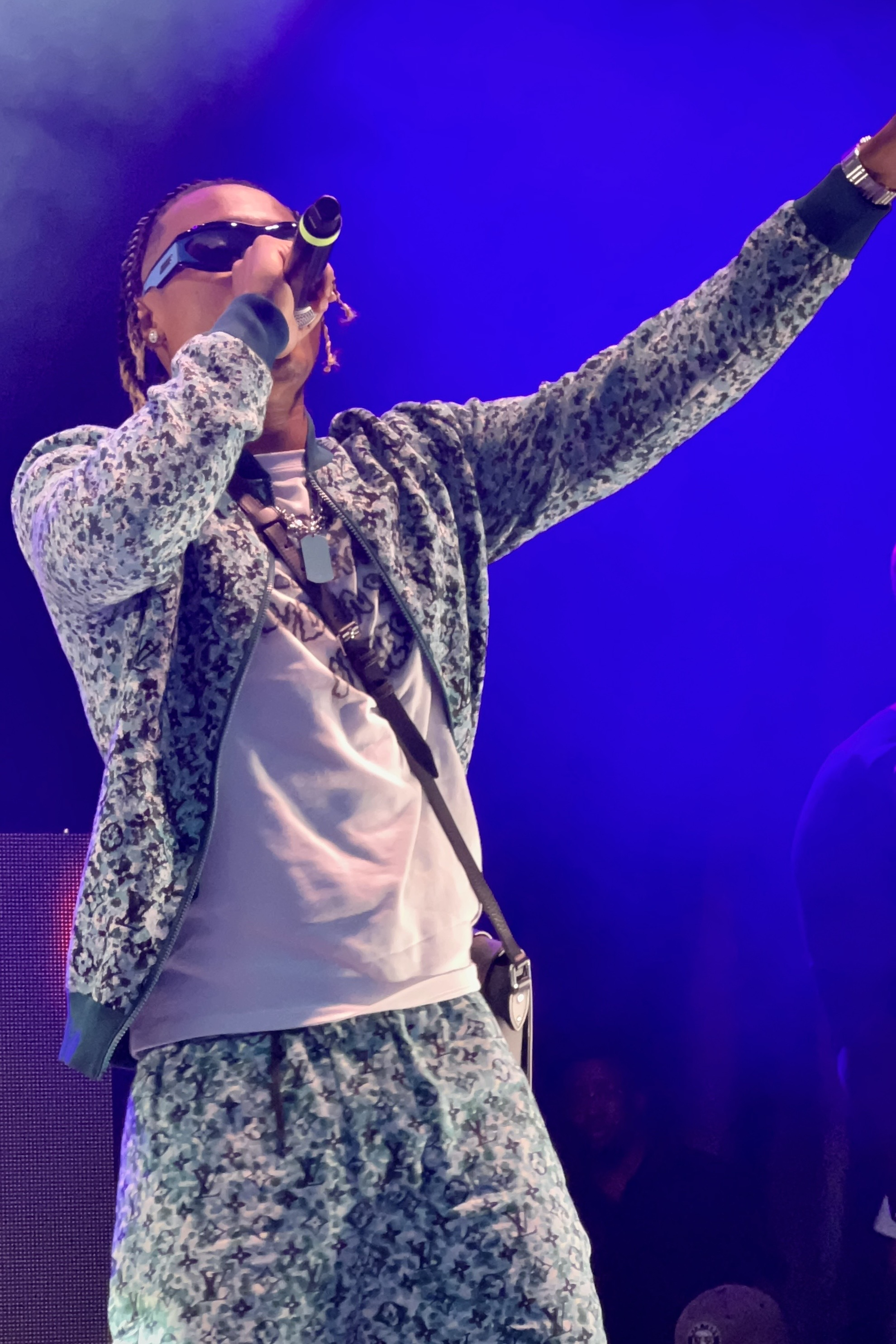
- Oboy performing in Neuchâtel, Switzerland, in 2023

Background information
- Also known as: O'Boy, ΩBØY
- Born: Mihaja Ramiarinarivo; 6 January 1997 (age 29); Madagascar
- Genres: Hip-hop, trap, cloud rap, mumble rap
- Occupation: Rapper
- Years active: 2015–present
- Labels: Syndicate Records, Believe Records
- Website: oboyofficiel.com

Mihaja Ramiarinarivo (born 6 January 1997), better known by his stage name Oboy (stylised as OBOY and occasionally as ΩBØY), is a French rapper of Malagasy origin. He raps in the mumble rap style.

== Biography ==
Born in Madagascar, Oboy lived in Villeneuve-Saint-Georges, Val-de-Marne, from the age of six. The eldest and only son of three children, his father introduced him to a wide variety of music, including Michael Jackson, Bob Marley and Tupac Shakur.

At the age of 17, members of Oboy's former collective Way Boto invited him to record music, which eventually evolved into his first EP, Olyside – a cloud rap and trap recording. It was followed in March 2018 by Southside, and in July 2019 by his first full-length album, Omega.

Oboy's second album No crari went to number 3 on the French Albums Chart in September 2021. The single "TDB" topped the French Singles Chart for five weeks in August and September and received 68 million streams by December, earning it Platinum status for topping 50 million streams.

Oboy has described ASAP Rocky and Migos as stylistic influences.

== Discography ==
=== Albums ===
Year	Album	Peak positions				Certifications
Year	Album	FRA	BEL (Fl)	BEL (Wa)	SWI	Certifications
2019	Omega	31	—	64	—	SNEP: Platinum
2021	No crari	3	95	6	8	SNEP: Platinum
2025	Olyboy	4	—	29	19	

=== EPs ===
Year	EP	Peak positions		
Year	EP	FRA	BEL (Wa)	SWI
2020	Mafana	20	28	59

=== Mixtapes ===
With Way Boto

- 2016: Hoverboard

Solo

Year	Album	Peak positions
Year	Album	FRA
2018	Olyside	—
2018	Southside	91

=== Singles ===
Year	Title	Peak positions			Album	Certifications
Year	Title	FRA	BEL (Wa)	SWI	Album	Certifications
2020	"Cruel"	27	—	—	SNEP: Platinum	No crari
2021	"No blata"	44	—	—	SNEP: Gold	No crari
2021	"TDB"	1	17	39	SNEP: Diamond	No crari

=== Featured in ===
Year	Title	Peak positions			Album / EP / Mixtape	Certifications
Year	Title	FRA	BEL (Wa)	SWI	Album / EP / Mixtape	Certifications
2020	"Préféré" (Aya Nakamura featuring Oboy)	4	—	—	Aya	
2021	"Cramé" (with Koba LaD)	22	—	—	Cartel Vol. 1	
2021	"Attentat" (PLK featuring Oboy)	4	43	63	Enna Boost	SNEP: Platinum
2021	"Le maire" (Maes featuring Oboy)	14	—	81	Réelle vie 3.0	
2022	"Rotterdam" (Uzi featuring Oboy)	89	—	—		

=== Other songs ===
Year	Title	Peak positions			Album / EP / Mixtape	Certifications
Year	Title	FRA	BEL (Wa)	SWI	Album / EP / Mixtape	Certifications
2019	"Je m'en tape" (feat. Aya Nakamura & Dopebwoy)	65	—	—	Non-album release	SNEP: Gold
2020	"Meilleurs" (feat. 4Keus)	135	—	—	Non-album release	
2020	"Cabeza"	4	40	—	Mafana	SNEP: Diamond
2020	"Mélodie"	101	—	—	Mafana	SNEP: Gold
2021	"Avec toi"	68	—	—	Non-album release	SNEP: Diamond
2021	"Louis V"	8	—	96	No crari	SNEP: Gold
2021	"Ysl"	24	—	—	No crari	
2021	"Cosmos"	38	—	—	No crari	
2021	"Elvira"	41	—	—	No crari	
2021	"Armada"	42	—	—	No crari	
2021	"Terrible"	54	—	—	No crari	
2021	"Air Tlanta"	58	—	—	No crari	
2021	"Ariel"	60	—	—	No crari	
2021	"Bétoile"	63	—	—	No crari	
2021	"Aqua86"	78	—	—	No crari	
2021	"P2 Interlude"	115	—	—	No crari	
