= Chimiyé =

Single by Aya Nakamura
- Released: February 20, 2025
- Genre: Afrobeats; R&B; urban pop
- Length: 2:31
- Label: Rec. 118; Nakamura Industrie
- Songwriter: Aya Nakamura
- Producers: JAYJAY; Doums; Alpha Wann

Aya Nakamura singles chronology
"42" (2024)	"Chimiyé" (2025)	"Baddies" (2025)

Music video
- "Chimiyé" on YouTube

"Chimiyé" is a song by French and Malian singer Aya Nakamura. It was released on February 20, 2025.

== Background and composition ==
Chimiyé is an afrobeats, R&B and urban pop song.

== Charts ==
Chart performance for "Chimiyé"
Chart (2025)	Peak position
France (SNEP)	53
