= Tiakola =

French rapper (born 1999)

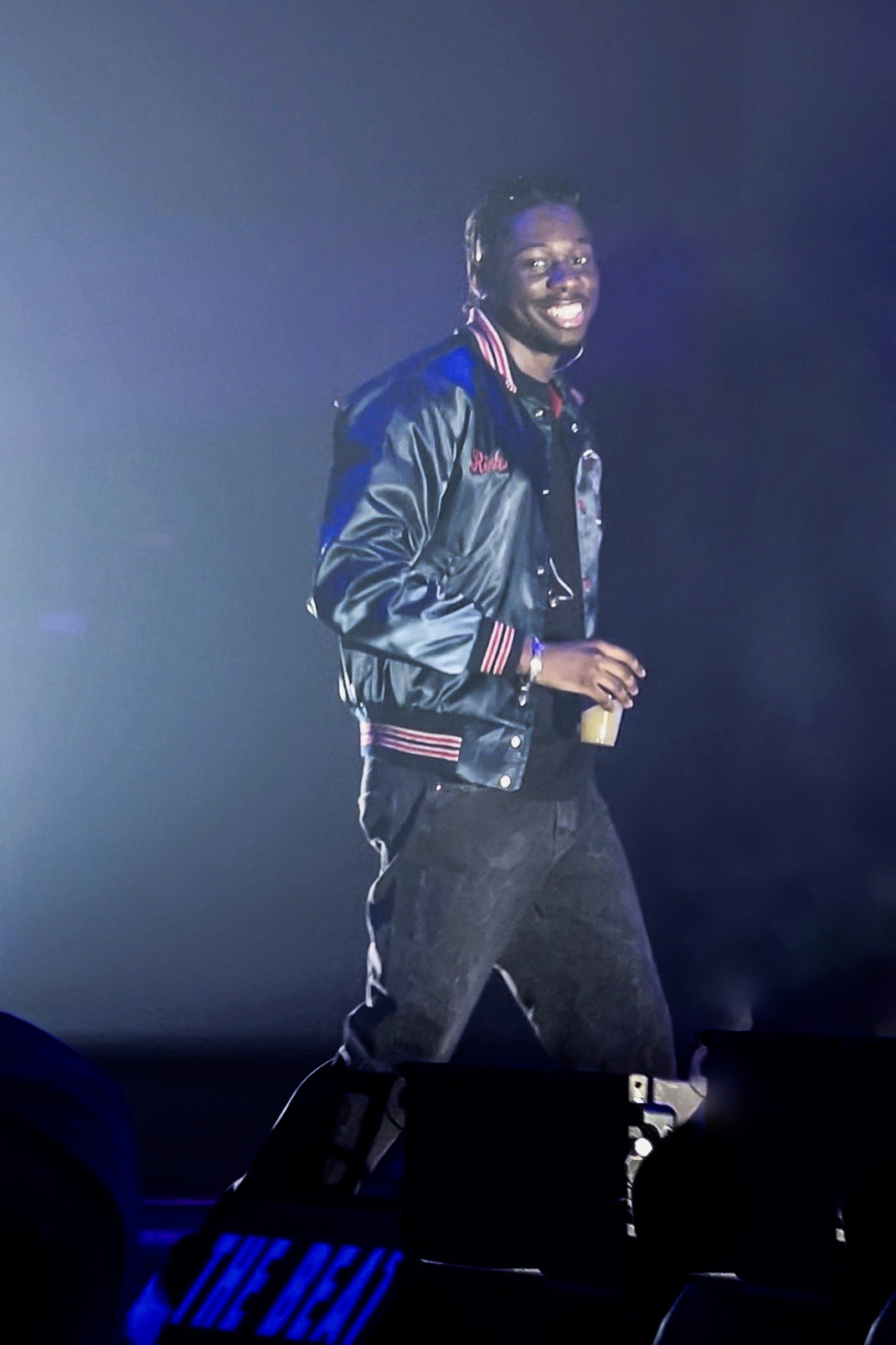
- Tiakola in 2022

Background information
- Also known as: Tiako, Tiako La Mélo, La Mélo
- Born: William Mundala; 4 December 1999 (age 26); Bondy, France
- Genres: French hip hop; drill; R&B
- Occupations: Rapper; singer
- Years active: 2015–present
- Labels: Wati B; Atlantic Records France
- Member of: 4Keus

William Mundala (born 4 December 1999), known professionally as Tiakola, is a French rapper and singer, and a former member of the group 4Keus before his solo career.

== Biography ==
Of Congolese origin, Tiakola was born in Bondy and grew up in the "Cité des 4000" housing project in La Courneuve. He is the last of eight siblings.

In 2019, while remaining a member of the group, Tiakola embarked on a solo career with the title Sombre Mélodie, taken from the CRCLR Mouvement compilation. Subsequently, he was invited for collaborations by artists such as Tayc, Dadju, Franglish, Leto and Gazo and then returned solo in 2021 with the track Pousse-toi.

On 27 May 2022, he released his first album Mélo containing 16 tracks, with 20 in physical versions, including collaborations with rappers Hamza, Gazo, Niska, SDM and Rsko.

On 25 August 2023, he released two songs, featuring British rapper Dave, namely, 'Meridian' and 'Special'.

== Discography ==
=== Albums ===
==== Studio albums ====
List of studio albums, with selected chart positions, sales and certifications
| Title | Album details | Peak chart positions | | | | | Certifications |
| Title | Album details | FRA | BEL (WA) | BEL (FL) | CAN | SWI | Certifications |
|---|---|---|---|---|---|---|---|
| Mélo | Released: 27 May 2022; Label: Wati B, Sony Music France; Format: Digital download, streaming | 1 | 2 | 40 | — | 7 | SNEP: Platinum |
| BDLM Vol. 1 | Released: 20 September 2024; Label: Melo World, Atlantic; Format: Digital download, streaming | 1 | 2 | 24 | — | 5 | |
| WpointM | Released: 24 September 2026; Label: Melo World, Atlantic; Format: Digital download, streaming | 1 | 3 | 13 | 89 | 1 | |

==== Collaborative albums ====
List of studio albums, with selected chart positions, sales and certifications
| Title | Album details | Peak chart positions | | | | Certifications |
| Title | Album details | FRA | BEL (WA) | BEL (FL) | SWI | Certifications |
|---|---|---|---|---|---|---|
| La Melo est Gangx (with Gazo) | Released: 1 December 2023; Label: BSB Productions, M3lo World, Wati B, Sony Music France; Format: Digital download, streaming | 1 | 1 | 69 | 3 | SNEP: Platinum |

=== Extended plays ===
List of EPs with selected chart positions
| Title | EP details | Peak chart positions | | |
| Title | EP details | FRA | BEL (WA) | SWI |
|---|---|---|---|---|
| X | Released: 2 March 2024; Label: Melo World, Atlantic; Format: Digital download, streaming | 11 | 14 | 13 |

=== Singles ===
==== As lead artist ====
| Title | Year | Peak chart positions | | | | | | Certifications | Album |
| Title | Year | FRA | BEL (WA) | IRE | NZ Hot | SWI | UK | Certifications | Album |
|---|---|---|---|---|---|---|---|---|---|
| "Sombre mélodie" | 2019 | — | — | — | — | — | — | | CRCLR Mouvement, vol. 1 |
| "Pousse-toi" | 2021 | 18 | — | — | — | — | — | SNEP: Platinum | Booska P Compilation |
| "Étincelle (Maradona)" | 2021 | 19 | — | — | — | — | — | SNEP: Gold | Mélo |
| "La Clé" | 2021 | 50 | — | — | — | — | — | SNEP: Platinum | Mélo |
| "M3lo" | 2022 | 10 | — | — | — | — | — | SNEP: Gold | Mélo |
| "Mise en garde" | 2022 | — | — | — | — | — | — | | Non-album singles |
| "Mayday" | 2022 | — | — | — | — | — | — | | Non-album singles |
| "Sans nouvelle" | 2022 | 57 | — | — | — | — | — | | Planète Rap Tiakola #Mélo |
| "Meuda" | 2022 | 4 | 25 | — | — | — | — | SNEP: Diamond | Non-album singles |
| "Meridian" (with Dave) | 2023 | 1 | 7 | 62 | 23 | 10 | 41 | SNEP: Diamond | Non-album singles |
| "Special" (with Dave) | 2023 | 8 | 38 | — | — | 53 | — | SNEP: Gold | Non-album singles |
| "Mami Wata" (with Gazo) | 2023 | 5 | 28 | — | — | — | — | SNEP: Gold | La Mala est Gangx |
| "God Bless" (with Leto & Rsko) | 2024 | 18 | — | — | — | — | — | | Trap$tar 3 |
| "500" (with La Fève) | 2024 | 84 | — | — | — | — | — | | 24 |
| "T.I.A (A Colors Show)" | 2024 | 12 | 50 | — | — | — | — | | BDLM Vol. 1 |
| "Manon B" (with Ryflo and Oksoow) | 2024 | 2 | 3 | — | — | — | — | | BDLM Vol. 1 |
| "Pona nini" (with Genezio and Prototype) | 2024 | 6 | 38 | — | — | — | — | | BDLM Vol. 1 |
| "1h55" (with Rsko and Hamza) | 2024 | 8 | 42 | — | — | — | — | | BDLM Vol. 1 |
| "La melo est dans la bounce" (with Genezio) | 2024 | — | 50 | — | — | — | — | | Non-album singles |
| "Les diamants de Bokassa" (with Ninho) | 2026 | 2 | 28 | — | — | — | — | | Non-album singles |
| "Mélo décale" | 2026 | 2 | 41 | — | — | 50 | — | | WpointM |
| "La nocturne" (with Theodora) | 2026 | 2 | 34 | — | — | 31 | — | | WpointM |

==== As featured artist ====
| Title | Year | Peak chart positions | | | Certifications | Album |
| Title | Year | FRA | BEL (WA) | SWI | Certifications | Album |
|---|---|---|---|---|---|---|
| "Mme Caroline" (Liim’s featuring Tiakola) | 2019 | — | — | — | | Planète Rap Leto #TRAP$TAR2 |
| "Snake #3 (Pause)" (Prototype featuring Tiakola) | 2019 | — | — | — | | Non-album singles |
| "Biberon" (Franglish featuring Tiakola & Leto) | 2020 | 69 | — | — | | Mood |
| "Mood" (Liim’s featuring Tiakola) | 2020 | — | — | — | | Non-album singles |
| "Dieu Merci" (Dadju featuring Tiakola) | 2020 | 7 | 34 | 94 | SNEP: Gold | Poison ou Antidote |
| "Bob Marley" (Prototype featuring Tiakola) | 2020 | — | — | — | | Jeune Bandit Serpent |
| "Kassav" (Gazo featuring Tiakola) | 2021 | 19 | — | — | SNEP: Diamond | Drill Fr |
| "Pololo" (MHD featuring Tiakola) | 2021 | 15 | — | 81 | | Mansa |
| "Comme Moi" (Ronisia featuring Tiakola) | 2021 | 71 | — | — | | Ronisia |
| "Reste-là" (Gambino La MG featuring Tiakola) | 2022 | 64 | — | — | SNEP: Gold | Gambinerie |
| "Devant Le Nine" (Dehmo and Hache-P featuring Tiakola) | 2022 | — | — | — | | Pœtic Bendo II |
| "Redescends" (SDM featuring Tiakola) | 2022 | 15 | — | — | SNEP: Platinum | Liens du 100 |
| "Bosseur" (Rsko featuring Tiakola) | 2022 | 65 | — | — | | LMBD |
| "Toute La Journée" (Zola featuring Tiakola) | 2023 | 4 | 15 | 26 | SNEP: Platinum | Diamant du Bled |
| "Délire" (Joé Dwèt Filé featuring Tiakola) | 2023 | 21 | — | — | | Daddy 9 |
| "Bonsoir Paris (Mama No Cry)" (S.Pri Noir featuring Tiakola) | 2023 | 46 | — | — | | La Cour des Miracles |

=== Other charted and certified songs ===
| Title | Year | Peak chart positions | | | Certifications | Album |
| Title | Year | FRA | BEL (WA) | SWI | Certifications | Album |
|---|---|---|---|---|---|---|
| "Ami ou ennemi" (Alonzo featuring Tiakola) | 2021 | 111 | — | — | | Capo Dei Capi Vol. II & III |
| "Prends mes lovés" (Dinos featuring Tiakola) | 2021 | 88 | — | — | | Stamina, Memento |
| "Mapessa" (Leto featuring Tiakola) | 2021 | 6 | — | 64 | SNEP: Diamond | 17% |
| "Journée" (with Niska) | 2021 | 70 | — | — | SNEP: Gold | Le monde est méchant |
| "Pas comme ça" (with Tayc) | 2021 | 39 | — | — | | Fleur froide – Second état: la cristallisation |
| "Mardi gras" (Maes featuring Tiakola & Zed) | 2021 | 6 | — | 67 | SNEP: Platinum | Réelle vie 3.0 |
| "1ntro'p" | 2022 | 47 | — | — | SNEP: Diamond | Mélo |
| "#TT" | 2022 | 38 | — | — | | Mélo |
| "Arsenik" | 2022 | 51 | — | — | | Mélo |
| "Parapluie" | 2022 | 35 | — | — | SNEP: Gold | Mélo |
| "Mode AV" (Tiakola featuring Gazo & Niska) | 2022 | 6 | — | 67 | SNEP: Diamond | Mélo |
| "Si j'savais" | 2022 | 16 | — | — | SNEP: Platinum | Mélo |
| "Meuda" | 2022 | 3 | 25 | — | SNEP: Diamond | Mélo |
| "Gasolina" (Tiakola featuring Rsko) | 2022 | 4 | 38 | 57 | | Mélo |
| "Soza" | 2022 | 30 | — | — | SNEP: Gold | Mélo |
| "Riri / No camera" | 2022 | 41 | — | — | SNEP: Gold | Mélo |
| "Atasanté" (Tiakola featuring Hamza) | 2022 | 10 | 38 | 79 | SNEP: Platinum | Mélo |
| "Roro" (Tiakola featuring SDM) | 2022 | 15 | — | — | SNEP: Platinum | Mélo |
| "Coucher de soleil" | 2022 | 31 | — | — | SNEP: Gold | Mélo |
| "R.I.Peace" | 2022 | 46 | — | — | | Mélo |
| "Fleurs" (Gazo featuring Tiakola) | 2022 | 10 | — | — | SNEP: Diamond | KMT |
| "Palavé" (Rsko featuring Tiakola) | 2022 | 83 | — | — | SNEP: Gold | LMBD |
| "Quand j’y repense" (Mig featuring Tiakola) | 2022 | 8 | — | — | | Toujours + |
| "Plus belle la vie, plus belle la mort" (Dosseh featuring Tiakola) | 2022 | 32 | — | — | | Trop tôt pour mourir |
| "Me Sauvert" (Zed featuring Tiakola) | 2022 | 170 | — | — | | SOIXVNT3 – Part. 2 |
| "Cadeau" (Aya Nakamura featuring Tiakola) | 2023 | 4 | 47 | — | SNEP: Gold | DNK |
| "Atasanté Part.2" (Hamza featuring Tiakola) | 2023 | 6 | — | — | SNEP: Gold | Sincèrement |
| "Tout seul" (Werenoi featuring Tiakola) | 2023 | 9 | — | — | | Carré |
| "Balle Dans le Coeur" (Ikaz Boi featuring Tiakola) | 2023 | 16 | — | — | | Brut4l |
| "24/34" (with Gazo) | 2023 | 7 | 33 | — | | La Melo est Gangx |
| "Sobad" (with Gazo) | 2023 | 10 | — | — | | La Melo est Gangx |
| "A.V.S.D" (with Gazo featuring Skread) | 2023 | 16 | — | — | | La Melo est Gangx |
| "Cartier" (with Gazo) | 2023 | 4 | 34 | 76 | SNEP: Gold | La Melo est Gangx |
| "Notre Dame" (with Gazo) | 2023 | 1 | 18 | 43 | SNEP: Gold | La Melo est Gangx |
| "Interlude" (with Gazo) | 2023 | 18 | — | — | | La Melo est Gangx |
| "Afrikanbadman" (with Gazo) | 2023 | 14 | — | — | | La Melo est Gangx |
| "200K" | 2023 | 8 | 40 | — | SNEP: Gold | La Melo est Gangx |
| "Ambitions" (with Gazo featuring Kore) | 2023 | 17 | — | — | | La Melo est Gangx |
| "Mami Wata" (with Gazo) | 2023 | 6 | 28 | — | SNEP: Gold | La Melo est Gangx |
| "Outro" (with Gazo) | 2023 | 19 | — | — | | La Melo est Gangx |
| "Miné sur Paname" (Jul featuring Tiakola) | 2023 | 12 | — | — | | La route est longue |
| "X" | 2024 | 28 | — | — | | X |
| "Solo" (Tiakola featuring La Fève) | 2024 | 47 | — | — | | X |
| "#Bátiment1" | 2024 | 63 | — | — | | X |
| "Human Weakness" | 2024 | 77 | — | — | | X |
| "2009'" | 2024 | 66 | — | — | | X |
| "P&Lové" | 2024 | 81 | — | — | | X |
| "Protect" | 2024 | 29 | — | — | | BDLM Vol. 1 |
| "Formidable" | 2024 | 31 | — | — | | BDLM Vol. 1 |
| "Reste-Là" | 2024 | 27 | — | — | | BDLM Vol. 1 |
| "Cabrel" | 2024 | 40 | — | — | | BDLM Vol. 1 |
| "Y.J (C'est Ko)" | 2024 | 42 | — | — | | BDLM Vol. 1 |
| "Psychologique" | 2024 | 46 | — | — | | BDLM Vol. 1 |
| "Ping Pong" | 2024 | 49 | — | — | | BDLM Vol. 1 |
| "Fast Like Famille" | 2024 | 56 | — | — | | BDLM Vol. 1 |
| "Grand Prix" | 2024 | 83 | — | — | | BDLM Vol. 1 |
| "Derniere Danse" | 2024 | 85 | — | — | | BDLM Vol. 1 |
| "Jet Lag" (with Jorja Smith) | 2026 | 8 | — | 88 | | WpointM |
