= Destinée =

Studio album by Aya Nakamura
- Released: 21 November 2025
- Recorded: Late 2023; November 2025
- Genre: Amapiano; zouk; shatta; kompa; dancehall; R&B; Afrofunk
- Length: 49:30
- Language: French; English; Spanish
- Label: Warner Music France

Aya Nakamura chronology
DNK (2023)	Destinée (2025)

Singles from Destinée
- 1. "Baddies" Released: 15 May 2025; 2. "Désarmer" Released: 9 October 2025; 3. "No Stress" Released: 19 November 2025

Singles from Destinée Supremacy
- 1. "Sexy Nana" Released: 7 May 2026

Destinée is the fifth studio album by French and Malian singer Aya Nakamura. It was released on 21 November 2025 through Warner Music France.

The album features guest appearances from Colombian-American singer Kali Uchis, Jamaican singer Shenseea, French singer Kany, British-Nigerian singer JayO, and French-Haitian singer Joé Dwèt Filé. A deluxe edition of this album, titled Destinée Supremacy, was released on 31 May 2026, and featuring eight new tracks, including the single "Sexy Nana" in collaboration with French-Senegalese rapper La Rvfleuze.

== Background ==
In October 2025, Nakamura announced Destinée would be released on 21 November 2025 via Warner Music France. The album was said to mark the start of a new era in her sound and persona—a "futuristic" aesthetic teased on social media with visual elements such as a blue wig, silver nails and cosmic styling.

== Controversy ==
In May 2026, Serbian singer Ivana ‘Boom’ Nikolić plagiarized the cover.

== Track listing ==
Destinée track listing
No.	Title	Length
1.	"Anesthésie"	2:50
2.	"No Stress"	2:26
3.	"Baby Boy" (with Kali Uchis)	3:07
4.	"Alien"	2:58
5.	"Il veut"	2:16
6.	"Summum"	2:33
7.	"Dis-moi" (with Shenseea)	2:26
8.	"Bueno"	2:37
9.	"Carnet d'adresses"	2:42
10.	"Blues"	3:44
11.	"Obsession"	2:30
12.	"Pamela" (with Kany)	2:38
13.	"Désarmer"	2:38
14.	"Débrancher"	2:37
15.	"Tralala" (with JayO)	2:48
16.	"Kata"	2:21
17.	"Baddies" (with Joé Dwèt Filé)	3:27
18.	"Kouma"	2:44
Total length:		49:30

== Charts ==
=== Weekly charts ===
Weekly chart performance for Destinée
Chart (2025)	Peak position
Belgian Albums (Ultratop Wallonia)	9
French Albums (SNEP)	1
Swiss Albums (Schweizer Hitparade)	16

=== Year-end charts ===
Year-end chart performance for Destinée
Chart (2025)	Position
French Albums (SNEP)	64

== Certifications ==
Certifications for Destinée
Region	Certification	Certified units/sales
France (SNEP)	Platinum	100,000^{‡}
^{‡} Sales+streaming figures based on certification alone.
