= Bâtiment 7 =

Bâtiment 7 may refer to:

- Bâtiment 7 (Évry), a building in Évry, Essonne, Île-de-France, home of many famous French rappers
- Bâtiment 7 (Montreal), building of shared community space, in the Pointe Saint-Charles suburb of Montreal, Quebec, Canada
