= DNK (album) =

Studio album by Aya Nakamura
- Released: 27 January 2023
- Recorded: 2021–2022
- Genre: Zouk; R&B
- Length: 41:48
- Language: French
- Label: Rec. 118; Warner Music France
- Producer: DJ Bibinio; Hardlevel; Shiruken Music

Aya Nakamura chronology
Aya (2020)	DNK (2023)	Destinée (2025)

Singles from DNK
- 1. "SMS" Released: 1 December 2022; 2. "Baby" Released: 12 January 2023; 3. "Daddy" Released: 3 May 2023

DNK is the fourth studio album by French and Malian singer Aya Nakamura. It was released on 27 January 2023 through Warner Music France.

The album features guest appearances by SDM, Tiakola, Myke Towers and Kim. It was preceded by the single "SMS", which reached the top 20 in Nakamura's home country France, at number 16 then by "Baby", which reached the top 3 in Nakamura's home country France, at number 2, in Wallonia at number 27 and in Switzerland in 32.

== Promotion ==
Nakamura announced her album through a YouTube livestream on 6 January 2023. She also announced the presale buying methods for her concert at the Accor Arena on 26 May 2023, which sold out almost immediately.

== Track listing ==
DNK track listing
No.	Title	Lyrics	Music	Producer(s)	Length
1.	"Corazon"	Aya Nakamura	Nakamura	Seysey	2:45
2.	"Baby"	Nakamura	Nakamura; Max et Seny; Shiruken Music	Max et Seny; Shiruken Music	2:42
3.	"Daddy" (featuring SDM)	Nakamura; Beni Mosabu	Nakamura	Drama State	3:17
4.	"SMS"	Nakamura	Nakamura; Hardlevel; Shiruken Music	Hardlevel; Shiruken Music	2:33
5.	"Tous les jours"	Nakamura	Nakamurs	Hardlevel; Shiruken Music	2:50
6.	"T'as peur (featuring Myke Towers)"	Nakamura; Michael Torres	Nakamura	Max et Seny	3:35
7.	"Beleck"	Nakamura	Nakamura	Hardlevel; Shiruken Music	2:19
8.	"Cadeau" (featuring Tiakola)	Nakamura; William Mundala	Nakamura	Hardlevel; Shiruken Music	2:31
9.	"J'ai mal"	Nakamura	Nakamura	Max et Seny	2:33
10.	"Coller"	Nakamura	Nakamura	Seysey	2:51
11.	"Le goût"	Nakamura	Nakamura	Seysey	2:47
12.	"Chacun" (featuring Kim)	Nakamura; Kim Almarcha	Nakamura	Max et Seny	3:05
13.	"Haut niveau"	Nakamura	Nakamura	Starow	3:02
14.	"Bloqué"	Nakamura	Nakamura	Boumidjal; HoloMobb; Yeuss K	2:34
15.	"Fin"	Nakamura	Nakamura	Hardlevel; Shiruken Music	2:24
Total length:					41:48

Deluxe edition (bonus)
No.	Title	Lyrics	Music	Producer(s)	Length
16.	"Come back"	Nakamura	Nakamura; Aloïs Zandry; Vladimir Boudnikoff; Djadoo & Zimgotit	Zandry; Boudnikoff	2:55
17.	"Bisous"	Nakamura	Nakamura; Silly raiito; Timo	Timo	2:44
18.	"Chérie"	Nakamura	Nakamura; Silly raiito; Timo	Kimo; Silly raiito	3:09

== Charts ==
=== Weekly charts ===
Weekly chart performance for DNK
Chart (2023)	Peak position
Belgian Albums (Ultratop Flanders)	65
Belgian Albums (Ultratop Wallonia)	2
French Albums (SNEP)	1
Swiss Albums (Schweizer Hitparade)	6

=== Year-end charts ===
2023 year-end chart performance for DNK
Chart (2023)	Position
Belgian Albums (Ultratop Wallonia)	23
French Albums (SNEP)	14

2024 year-end chart performance for DNK
Chart (2024)	Position
Belgian Albums (Ultratop Wallonia)	187
French Albums (SNEP)	89

2025 year-end chart performance for DNK
Chart (2025)	Position
French Albums (SNEP)	172

== Certifications ==
Certifications for DNK
Region	Certification	Certified units/sales
France (SNEP)	2× Platinum	200,000^{‡}
^{‡} Sales+streaming figures based on certification alone.
