= Soldat (song) =

Single by Aya Nakamura

from the album Nakamura (reissue)
- Released: 13 September 2019
- Recorded: 2018
- Length: 3:04
- Label: Rec. 118; Warner Music France
- Songwriters: Aya Nakamura; Haristone; Le Side; Ever Mihigo
- Producers: Aloïs Zandry; Vladimir Boudnikoff

Aya Nakamura singles chronology
"Pookie" (2019)	"Soldat" (2019)	"40%" (2019)

Music video
- "Soldat" on YouTube

"Soldat" is a song by French and Malian singer Aya Nakamura. It was released on 13 September 2019. It peaked at number 8 in France.

== Charts ==
Chart performance for "Soldat"
Chart (2019)	Peak position
Belgium (Ultratip Bubbling Under Wallonia)	15
France (SNEP)	8

== Certifications ==
Certifications for "Soldat"
Region	Certification	Certified units/sales
France (SNEP)	Platinum	200,000^{‡}
^{‡} Sales+streaming figures based on certification alone.
