= Doudou (song) =

Single by Aya Nakamura

from the album Aya
- Released: 9 October 2020
- Recorded: 2020
- Genre: Afrobeats
- Length: 2:48
- Label: Rec. 118; Parlophone; Warner Music France
- Songwriters: Aya Nakamura; Ever Mihigo; Machynist
- Producer: Vladimir Boudnikoff

Aya Nakamura singles chronology
"Jolie nana" (2020)	"Doudou" (2020)	"Plus jamais" (2020)

Music video
- "Doudou" on YouTube

"Doudou" is a song by French and Malian singer Aya Nakamura. It was released on 9 October 2020.

== Charts ==
Chart performance for "Doudou"
Chart (2020–2021)	Peak position
Belgium (Ultratip Bubbling Under Flanders)	20
Belgium (Ultratop 50 Wallonia)	40
France (SNEP)	6
Switzerland (Schweizer Hitparade)	61
UK Afrobeats (Official Charts)	16

== Certifications ==
Certifications for "Doudou"
Region	Certification	Certified units/sales
France (SNEP)	Platinum	200,000^{‡}
^{‡} Sales+streaming figures based on certification alone.
