= Comportement =

Single by Aya Nakamura

from the album Journal intime
- Released: June 27, 2017
- Length: 2:53
- Label: Parlophone; Rec 118
- Songwriter: Aya Nakamura
- Producer: Christopher Ghenda

Aya Nakamura singles chronology
"Super héros" (2016)	"Comportement" (2017)	"Oumou Sangaré" (2017)

Music video
- Comportement on YouTube

"Comportement" is a song by French and Malian singer Aya Nakamura from her debut studio album, Journal intime (2017). "Comportement" received a commercial release solely in France and Wallonia, where it charted at numbers 13 and 40, respectively.

== Charts ==
Chart (2017)	Peak position
Belgium (Ultratop 50 Wallonia)	40
France (SNEP)	13

Chart (2025)	Peak position
France (SNEP)	32

== Certifications ==
Region	Certification	Certified units/sales
Canada (Music Canada)	Gold	40,000^{‡}
France (SNEP)	Diamond	333,333^{‡}
^{‡} Sales+streaming figures based on certification alone.
