= VIP (Aya Nakamura song) =

Single by Aya Nakamura
- Released: September 21, 2022
- Genre: R&B; teen pop; soul
- Length: 2:27
- Label: Rec. 118; Warner Music France
- Songwriters: Aya Nakamura; BGRZ
- Producers: BGRZ; Vladimir Boudnikoff

Aya Nakamura singles chronology
"Méchante" (2022)	"VIP" (2022)	"SMS" (2022)

Audio video
- "VIP" on YouTube

VIP is a song by French-Malian singer Aya Nakamura. It was released on 21 September 2022.

== Compositions ==
"VIP" was written by Aya Nakamura and produced by Vladimir Boudnikoff.

== Charts ==
Chart performance for "VIP"
Chart (2022)	Peak position
France (SNEP)	39
