= Uzi (French rapper) =

French rapper

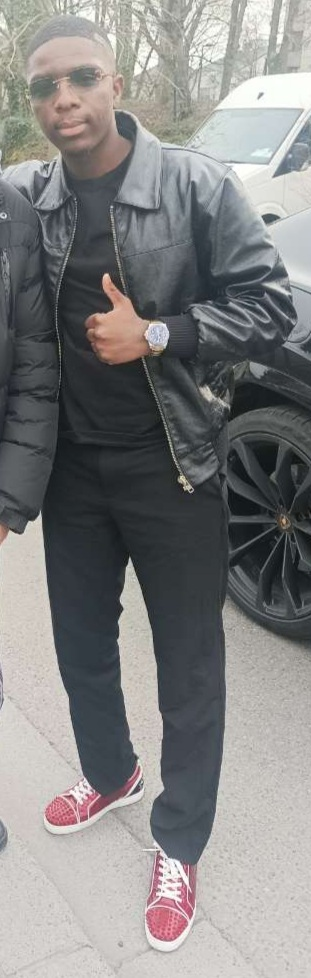
- Uzi in March 2024

Background information
- Born: 8 September 1999 (age 26); Fontainebleau
- Genres: French hip hop
- Occupation: Rapper
- Years active: 2015–present
- Labels: Sportback Reciords, Capitol Music France

Uzi (born September 8, 1999) is a French rapper and singer from Noisiel, France, and is of Congolese descent. He is signed to Sportback Records and Capitol Music France.

== Career ==
He started rapping in 2015–2016 and at the age of 17 had his first release "Guelar" followed by "Akrapovic" and the series Akrapo. "Drive By" attracted more attention with certain outlets refusing to play it. He adapted the slogan "rigueur, principe et boulot" and collaborated with rapper RK and Ninho. He is most famous with "À la fête" that reached #10 on SNEP, the French singles chart and was certified platinum. In February 2021, he released his first studio album Cœur abîmé that peaked at number 3 in French Albums Chart.

== Discography ==
=== Albums ===
Title	Year	Peak positions		
Title	Year	FRA	BEL (Wa)	SWI
Coeur abimé	2021	3	9	21
Meilleur qu'hier	2022	11	53	—
Sur le chemin	2024	15	43	—

=== Singles ===
Year	Title	Peak positions		Certification
Year	Title	FRA	BEL (Wa)	Certification
2020	"À la fête"	10	48	SNEP: Platinum
2020	"Violet" (featuring RK)	101	—	

=== Featured in ===
Year	Title	Peak positions	Album
Year	Title	FRA	Album
2021	"Chez nous"	75	Isk album Verité

=== Other songs ===
Year	Title	Peak positions	Album
Year	Title	FRA	Album
2020	"À l'aise"	101	
2021	"Intro"	92	Cœur abîmé
2021	"Cœur abîmé"	30	Cœur abîmé
2021	"Bella"	38	Cœur abîmé
2021	"Guitare"	78	Cœur abîmé
2021	"Guy Môquet"	91	Cœur abîmé
2021	"Numéro 10"	143	Cœur abîmé
2021	"Bâtiment"	144	Cœur abîmé
2021	"Madre mia"	145	Cœur abîmé
2021	"Etat du coeur"	154	Cœur abîmé
2021	"Couleurs"	186	Cœur abîmé
2021	"Mérité"	198	Cœur abîmé
