= Journal intime =

Studio album by Aya Nakamura
- Released: 25 August 2017
- Length: 62:25
- Labels: Rec. 118; Parlophone; Warner Music France
- Producers: Christopher Ghenda; Risbo; Dany Synthé

Aya Nakamura chronology
Journal intime (2017)	Nakamura (2018)

Singles from Journal intime
- 1. "Brisé" Released: 18 June 2015; 2. "Oublier" Released: 15 February 2016; 3. "Super héros" Released: 2 June 2016; 4. "Comportement" Released: 27 June 2017; 5. "Oumou Sangaré" Released: 18 August 2017; 6. "Angela" Released: 3 November 2017

Journal intime is the debut album by French and Malian singer Aya Nakamura. It was released on 25 August 2017 by Warner Music France.

It features guest appearances by MHD, Dadju, Jizo Djohn P., Lartiste and Gradur. It was preceded by six singles: "Brisé", "Oublier", "Super héros", "Comportement", "Oumou Sangaré" and "Angela", all of which charted in Nakamura's home country France.

== Background and promotion ==
Nakamura performed a concert at the Modibo-Keïta stadium in Bamako, opening for Nigerian-American singer Davido. She also dedicated a song to Malian singer Oumou Sangaré, who was born in Bamako. In January 2016, Nakamura signed a deal with Rec. 118, a label from Warner Music France. During the same year, she continued collaborating and released her second single "Super Héros", featuring rapper Gradur. On 23 September 2017, she participated in La Nuit du Mali at the Bercy in Paris, which was organized by Dawala to celebrate the Independence Day of Mali. She shared the stage with Sangaré and other Malian artists such as Cheick Tidiane Seck, Lassana Hawa, and Mokobé.

== Track listing ==
Nakamura track listing
No.	Title	Writer(s)	Producer(s)	Length
1.	"Angela"	Aya Nakamura	Christopher Ghenda	2:48
2.	"Oumou Sangaré"	Nakamura	Christopher Ghenda	3:13
3.	"Debout"	Nakamura	Christopher Ghenda	2:36
4.	"Karma"	Nakamura	Christopher Ghenda	3:06
5.	"Problèmes" (featuring MHD)	Nakamura; MHD	Christopher Ghenda	3:20
6.	"Réponds"	Nakamura	Christopher Ghenda	2:49
7.	"Brisé"	Nakamura	Christopher Ghenda	3:42
8.	"Fuego"	Nakamura; Dadju	Christopher Ghenda	3:47
9.	"Je n'ai pas besoin de toi" (featuring Dadju)	Nakamura; Barack Adama	Christopher Ghenda	3:05
10.	"Comportement"	Nakamura	Christopher Ghenda	2:52
11.	"Soirée parisienne" (featuring Jizo Djohn P.)	Nakamura; Jizo John	Christopher Ghenda	5:58
12.	"Jalousie" (featuring Lartiste)	Nakamura; Lartiste	Christopher Ghenda	3:00
13.	"Papys"	Nakamura	Christopher Ghenda	2:49
14.	"Si tu savais"	Nakamura; Haristone	Christopher Ghenda	2:56
15.	"Oprhelin" (featuring Keblack)	Nakamura; Keblack	Christopher Ghenda	3:35
16.	"Super héros" (featuring Gradur)	Nakamura; Alonso Ebonkoli; Gradur	Risbo	3:33
17.	"Oublier"	Heezy Lee	Dany Synthé; Risbo	3:30
18.	"J'ai mal (Pt. 2)"	Nakamura	Christopher Ghenda	3:10
19.	"Moi"	Nakamura	Christopher Ghenda	2:36
Total length:				62:25

== Charts ==
=== Weekly charts ===
Weekly chart performance for Journal intime
Chart (2017)	Peak position
Belgian Albums (Ultratop Flanders)	143
Belgian Albums (Ultratop Wallonia)	34
French Albums (SNEP)	6

=== Year-end charts ===
2017 year-end chart performance for Journal intime
Chart (2017)	Position
French Albums (SNEP)	133

2018 year-end chart performance for Journal intime
Chart (2018)	Position
French Albums (SNEP)	155
