= Aya (album) =

Studio album by Aya Nakamura
- Released: 13 November 2020
- Genre: Urban pop; soul; R&B; dancehall
- Length: 42:25
- Label: Rec. 118; Parlophone; Warner Music France
- Producer: Vladimir Boudnikoff; Heezy Lee; Julio Masidi; Jordan Houyez; Starow; Drama State; Timo; Aloïs Zandry

Aya Nakamura chronology
Nakamura (2018)	Aya (2020)	DNK (2023)

Singles from Aya
- 1. "Jolie nana" Released: 17 July 2020; 2. "Doudou" Released: 9 October 2020; 3. "Plus jamais" Released: 13 November 2020; 4. "Fly" Released: 17 March 2021

Professional ratings
Review scores
Source	Rating
Pitchfork	7.6/10

Aya is the third studio album by French and Malian singer Aya Nakamura. It was released on 13 November 2020 through Warner Music France.

The album features guest appearances by Stormzy, Ms Banks and Oboy. It was preceded by the singles "Jolie nana" and "Doudou", both of which reached the top 10 in Nakamura's home country France.

== Background and promotion ==
On 15 October 2020, Nakamura announced the album through her social media accounts. About the recording process, her boyfriend and producer Vladimir Boudnikoff revealed: "We spent days, nights, weeks in the studio on this album. And if there is one thing I can guarantee you, there is immense talent behind this woman". Nakamura herself explained: "I had a lot of fun, I've tried a lot of stuff, wanted to test some things like on "Doudou". I can't wait to see my fans again because I think they will be surprised." The album received advertising billboards on Times Square on 13 November.

== Track listing ==
Aya track listing
No.	Title	Writer(s)	Producer(s)	Length
1.	"Plus jamais" (featuring Stormzy)	Aya Nakamura; Stormzy	Heezy Lee; Timo	2:55
2.	"Tchop"	Nakamura	Julio Masidi . Jordan Houyez	2:50
3.	"Doudou"	Nakamura	Vladimir Boudnikoff	2:48
4.	"Jolie nana"	Nakamura	Masidi	2:27
5.	"Fly"	Nakamura	Boudnikoff	3:37
6.	"Biff"	Nakamura	Drama State	2:33
7.	"Sentiments grandissants"	Nakamura	Masidi . Houyez . Dave	2:21
8.	"Love de moi"	Nakamura	Masidi; Starow	2:36
9.	"Ça blesse"	Nakamura	Heezy Lee; Timo	2:36
10.	"Mon chéri"	Nakamura	Boudnikoff; Aloïs Zandry	2:35
11.	"Hot"	Nakamura; Boudnikoff	Boudnikoff	3:30
12.	"Nirvana"	Nakamura; Boudnikoff	Boudnikoff	2:30
13.	"La machine"	Nakamura	Boudnikoff	3:03
14.	"Mon Lossa" (featuring Ms Banks)	Nakamura; Thyra Oji	Masidi	3:05
15.	"Préféré" (featuring Oboy)	Nakamura; Oboy	Boudnikoff	2:54
Total length:				42:25

Physical edition bonus tracks

16. "Criminel"
17. "Plus la même"

== Charts ==
=== Weekly charts ===
Weekly chart performance for Aya
Chart (2020)	Peak position
Belgian Albums (Ultratop Flanders)	14
Belgian Albums (Ultratop Wallonia)	2
Dutch Albums (Album Top 100)	36
French Albums (SNEP)	2
Spanish Albums (Promusicae)	71
Swiss Albums (Schweizer Hitparade)	8

=== Year-end charts ===
2020 year-end chart performance for Aya
Chart (2020)	Position
Belgian Albums (Ultratop Wallonia)	104
French Albums (SNEP)	50

2021 year-end chart performance for Aya
Chart (2021)	Position
Belgian Albums (Ultratop Wallonia)	39
French Albums (SNEP)	32

2022 year-end chart performance for Aya
Chart (2022)	Position
Belgian Albums (Ultratop Wallonia)	170
French Albums (SNEP)	128

2023 year-end chart performance for Aya
Chart (2023)	Position
French Albums (SNEP)	186

== Certifications ==
Region	Certification	Certified units/sales
France (SNEP)	3× Platinum	300,000^{‡}
^{‡} Sales+streaming figures based on certification alone.
