= Bâtiment 7 (Évry) =

Housing project in Évry, home of many French rappers

Coordinates: 48.6269°N 2.4480°E

Bâtiment 7 or simply bât 7 (BAT 7) also known as 7binks (Seven Binks) is a housing project in Évry, Essonne, Île-de-France about 30 km south of Paris. Built on a locale known as La Dalle du Parc aux Lièvres, the building complex is recognized as an iconic one and is famous for being home to a number of French rappers, including Koba Lad, Bolémvn, Shotas, Keusty, Kodes, 2zé, Kaflo, Keusty and Chicaille Argenté and some others. A mural wall of many of the artists was drawn as a tribute. The label Seven Binks refers to the building. The debut album of the label is BAT7 and released on 23 July 2021. A number of French rap releases also refer to the project.

Le Bâtiment 7 and La Dalle are scheduled to be taken down and other projects rebuilt in their place for 1800 new lodgings. This will revitalize the area with reopening of many businesses that closed under the present conditions. Mayor of Évry-Courcouronnes Stéphane Beaudet has approved the destruction and replacement by a new project, despite a campaign to spare the building and instead making much needed renovations.

Nico le Colombien, a journalist at Booska-P prepared a documentary on the channel StreetPress about the building and met many of its artists. The 2020 documentary was directed by Matthieu Bidan and Cléo Bertet. Bidan was concerned about its fate saying: "This is crazy, because this building is a super remarkable location for the French rap nowadays" and wanted to keep a record of what the building represents. On one of the walls of Seven Binks, is written: "Le Parc aux Lièvres, Plus Qu'un Quartier, Une Fraternité" (Parc aux Lièvres. more than just a quarter, a brotherhood).

On 23 July 2021, the collective Seven Binks released an album titled Bat 7 about the housing project. It had been preceded by an EP of songs by Seven Binks called 7 Binks released in December 2020. The album has charted on the French Albums Chart.
