= SMS (song) =

Single by Aya Nakamura

from the album DNK
- Released: 1 December 2022
- Recorded: 2022
- Studio: Shiruken Music, Paris
- Genre: Zouk
- Length: 2:34
- Label: Rec. 118; Warner Music France
- Songwriter: Aya Nakamura
- Producer: Chris Mouyenne

Aya Nakamura singles chronology
"VIP" (2022)	"SMS" (2022)	"Baby" (2023)

Music video
- "SMS" on YouTube

"SMS" is a song by Aya Nakamura. It was released on 1 December 2022.

== Charts ==
Chart performance for "SMS"
Chart (2022)	Peak position
France (SNEP)	16
