= Pookie (song) =

2019 song by Aya Nakamura

- Capo Plaza remix cover

Single by Aya Nakamura

from the album Nakamura
- Released: 10 April 2019
- Recorded: 2018
- Length: 3:00
- Label: Rec. 118; Parlophone
- Songwriters: Aya Nakamura; Archibald Smith; Le Side; Ever Mihigo
- Producers: Aloïs Zandry; Vladimir Boudnikoff

Aya Nakamura singles chronology
"La dot" (2018)	"Pookie" (2019)	"Soldat" (2019)

Music video
- "Pookie" on YouTube

"Pookie" (French pronunciation: [puki], French slang for "snitch") is a song recorded by French and Malian singer Aya Nakamura. It was released as a single on 10 April 2019.

== Commercial performance ==
The song hit number 5 in France.

The song reached number 2 on the Italian Singles Chart, helped by the remix with Italian rapper Capo Plaza. The song also reached the top ten in Belgium.

== Charts ==
=== Weekly charts ===
Chart (2018–2020)	Peak position
Belgium (Ultratop 50 Flanders)	18
Belgium (Ultratop 50 Wallonia)	9
France (SNEP)	5
Italy (FIMI)	2
Netherlands (Single Tip)	2
Sweden Heatseeker (Sverigetopplistan)	14
Switzerland (Schweizer Hitparade)	55

Chart (2024)	Peak position
France (SNEP)	105

=== Year-end charts ===
Chart (2020)	Position
Italy (FIMI)	83
Turkey (Radiomonitor TR International)	14

== Certifications ==
Region	Certification	Certified units/sales
Belgium (BRMA)	3× Platinum	120,000^{‡}
Canada (Music Canada)	Platinum	80,000^{‡}
France (SNEP)	Diamond	333,333^{‡}
Italy (FIMI)	3× Platinum	210,000^{‡}
^{‡} Sales+streaming figures based on certification alone.
