= Love d'un voyou =

Single by Fababy featuring Aya Nakamura
- Released: 17 September 2015
- Recorded: 2015
- Genre: R&B
- Length: 3:56
- Songwriters: Fababy, Aya Nakamura, Ced Solo
- Producer: Will Solomon

"Love d'un voyou" is a song by Fababy featuring additional vocals by Malian-French singer Aya Nakamura released in 2015.

== Charts ==
=== Weekly charts ===
Chart (2015)	Peak position
Belgium (Ultratip Bubbling Under Wallonia)	37
France (SNEP)	9

=== Year-end charts ===
Chart (2015)	Position
France (SNEP)	157
