= Maes (rapper) =

French-Moroccan rapper (born 1995)

- Born: Walid Georgey; 10 January 1995 (age 31); Villepinte, Seine-Saint-Denis, France
- Origin: Sevran, Seine-Saint-Denis, France
- Genres: Hip hop
- Occupation: Rapper
- Years active: 2009–present
- Labels: LDS Production, Millenium, Capitol

Walid Georgey (born 10 January 1995), better known by his stage name Maes, is a French rapper of Moroccan origin from Sevran. His debut album, Pure (2018), certified triple platinum. Two years later, he released a second album, Les Derniers Salopards (The Last Bastards), certified diamond. Two more albums followed: Omerta (2023) and La vie continue (Life Goes On, 2024), both certified platinum. One of his most known singles is the diamond-certified "Madrina" with French rapper Booba.

== Life and career ==
Maes grew up in Beaudottes in Sevran in the northeastern suburbs of Paris with his five brothers and two sisters. He started rapping aged 14 forming the trio MSR with his friends Radmo and SY3. After high school, Maes served a sentence for 18 months in the prison of Villepinte from 2016 to 2017. During his incarceration, he released a number of songs and a mixtape Réelle Vie. After release from detention, he released "#MaesEstLibérable", and debuted as a supporting act for the groupe 13 Block at the gig in La Bellevilloise in December 2017. On 2 March 2018, he released a second mixtape Réelle Vie 2.0 and upon its success was signed to the Millenium label, part of Capitol Music France. With the single "Madrina" featuring Booba, he topped SNEP, the French Singles Chart. The music video was shot in Bogotá. With Millenium, he had released the albums Pure in 2018 and Les derniers salopards in 2020.

== Legal issues ==
In January 2025, Maes was arrested in Morocco, after leaving his residence in Dubai. His detention was reportedly related to a local investigation into an alleged kidnapping and unlawful confinement. He is currently remanded in Tangier 2 local prison. Although a French warrant had been issued for his arrest in October 2023, the Moroccan arrest was not connected to that case. The French warrant stemmed from Maes' failure to appear at his trial for "group assault" involving a 2018 incident outside a recording studio. In absentia, he was sentenced to 10 months in prison and fined €10,000. He has also been linked to several investigations concerning gang-related violence and drug trafficking in the Île-de-France region. In December 2024, he canceled a scheduled concert at Paris' Accor Arena due to the outstanding warrant.

On 25 November, 2025, Maes was sentenced to 7 years in prison at the Tangier Criminal Court of First Instance. He was found guilty of "forming a criminal organisation, attempted abduction and unlawful confinement."

== Discography ==
=== Albums ===
Title	Year	Peak positions				Units
Title	Year	FRA	BEL (Fl)	BEL (Wa)	SWI	Units
Pure	2018	5	—	25	36	
Les derniers salopards	2020	1	12	1	2	FRA: 61,995
Omerta	2023	3	107	5	2	
La vie continue	2024	1	164	1	—	

=== Mixtapes ===
Title	Year	Peak positions		
Title	Year	FRA	BEL (Fl)	BEL (Wa)
Réelle Vie	2017	—	—	—
Réelle vie 2.0	2018	65	—	135
Réelle vie 3.0	2021	—	58	4
En attendant LVC II	2024	—	—	13

=== Singles ===
==== As a lead artist ====
Title	Year	Peak positions			Album, EP or mixtape
Title	Year	FRA	BEL (Wa)	SWI	Album, EP or mixtape
"Billets verts"	2018	10	— (Note: "Billets verts" did not enter the official Belgian Ultratop 50 charts, but peaked at number 22 on the bubbling under Ultratip charts.)	—	Pure
"Avenue Montaigne"	2018	33	—	—	Pure
"Madrina" (featuring Booba)	2018	1	31	49	Pure
"Rude" (with Benab)	2019	80	—	—	Benam mixtape Dracarys
"NWR"	2019	40	—	—	Non-album single
"Liquide rouge"	2019	50	— (Note: "Liquide rouge" did not enter the official Belgian Ultratop 50 charts, but peaked at number 31 on the bubbling under Ultratip charts.)	—	Non-album single
"Street"	2019	4	27	63	Les derniers salopards
"Distant" (featuring Ninho)	2020	3	11	24	Les derniers salopards
"10K" (with Bolémvn)	2020	5	—	67	Bolémvn album Vol 169
"Platine o plomo" (with Booba)	2021	—	34	47	Réelle vie 3.0
"Fetty Wap"	2022	2	28	66	Omerta
"Galactic"	2023	1	30	45	Omerta
"4Motion"	2024	15	—	—	Non-album singles
"Survie"	2024	6	35	—	Non-album singles
"Cordillêre" (with Werenoi)	2024	22	—	—	Non-album singles
"T'avais raison" (with Gims)	2026	8	—	29	Non-album singles

==== As a featured artist ====
Title	Year	Peak positions			Album, EP or mixtape
Title	Year	FRA	BEL (Wa)	SWI	Album, EP or mixtape
"Tes rêves" (Dabs featuring Maes)	2019	44	—	—	Dabs mixtape Mainmise
"Matin" (Koba LaD featuring Maes)	2019	23	— (Note: "Matin" did not enter the official Belgian Ultratop 50 charts, but peaked at number 17 on the bubbling under Ultratip charts.)	—	Koba LaD album L'Affranchi
"L'odeur du charbon" (Dosseh featuring Maes)	2019	18	— (Note: "L'odeur du charbon" did not enter the official Belgian Ultratop 50 charts, but peaked at number 11 on the bubbling under Ultratip charts.)	—	Dosseh mixtape Summer Crack 4
"Stupéfiant" (Niro featuring Maes)	2019	58	—	—	Niro EP; Stupéfiant : Chapitre 2
"ASB" (Vald featuring Maes)	2019	18	—	—	Vald album Ce monde est cruel
"Le dire" (Da Uzi featuring Maes)	2020	28	—	—	Da Uzi album Architecte
"Ailleurs" (Timal featuring Maes)	2020	7	—	—	Non-album release
"Pourcent" (Naps featuring Maes)	2020	38	—	—	Naps album Carré VIP
"Béni" (Kaza featuring Maes)	2020	53	—	—	Kaza album Heartbreak Life
"Euros" (RK & Maes)	2020	13	—	—	RK album Neverland
"Boston George" (Lacrim featuring Maes)	2020	3	—	64	Lacrim album R.I.P.R.O. 4
"Coffre plein" (Koba LaD featuring Maes)	2020	2	7	19	Koba LaD album Détail
"Riina Toto" (13 Block featuring Maes)	2020	32	—	—	13 Block album BLO II
"Andale" (Benab featuring Maes)	2021	22	—	—	Benab album Au clair de la rue (Part. 1)
"VVV" (Booba featuring Maes)	2021	3	—	26	Booba album Ultra
"N26" (Kaza featuring Maes)	2021	91	—	—	Kaza album Toxic
"MPLT" (Bramsito featuring Maes)	2021	68	—	—	Bramsito album Substance
"Petit coeur" (RK featuring Maes)	2021	65	—	—	RK album 100 rancunes
"Maison d'arrêt" (Hornet La Frappe featuring Maes)	2021	63	—	—	Non-album release
"Rhum et machette" (Ziak featuring Maes)	2021	—	—	—	Akimbo
"Derrière nos tours" (Leto featuring Maes)	2021	16	—	—	Leto album 17%
"Le Vie De Star" (Werenoi featuring Maes and SCH)	2024	15	—	—	

=== Other charted songs ===
Title	Year	Peak positions			Album, EP or mixtape
Title	Year	FRA	BEL (Wa)	SWI	Album, EP or mixtape
"Mama"	2018	16	—	—	Pure
"J'voulais"	2018	18	—	—	Pure
"LDS"	2018	25	—	—	Pure
"Weed" (featuring Zed)	2018	37	—	—	Pure
"Zipette"	2018	41	—	—	Pure
"Fumer"	2018	52	—	—	Pure
"Mula"	2018	53	—	—	Pure
"Vue"	2018	54	—	—	Pure
"Panamera"	2018	60	—	—	Pure
"Depardieu"	2018	62	—	—	Pure
"Bâtiment"	2018	82	—	—	Pure
"Particulière"	2018	90	—	—	Pure
"Outro"	2018	94	—	—	Pure
"Blanche" (featuring Booba)	2020	2	49	10	Les derniers salopards
"Dybala" (featuring Jul)	2020	3	—	22	Les derniers salopards
"Dragović"	2020	8	—	—	Les derniers salopards
"Elvira"	2020	9	—	—	Les derniers salopards
"Mémoire"	2020	12	—	—	Les derniers salopards
"Les gens disent"	2020	13	—	—	Les derniers salopards
"Imparfait"	2020	13	—	—	Les derniers salopards
"Police"	2020	14	—	—	Les derniers salopards
"À côté de moi"	2020	16	—	—	Les derniers salopards
"Marco Polo"	2020	17	—	—	Les derniers salopards
"Étoile"	2020	18	—	—	Les derniers salopards
"Chromé"	2020	19	—	—	Les derniers salopards
"Prioritaire"	2020	28	—	—	Non-album release
"Menotté"	2020	113	—	—	Non-album release
"Neb nedal"	2020	146	—	—	Non-album release
"Mardi gras" (featuring Tiakola and Zed)	2021	—	—	67	Réelle vie 3.0
"Le maire" (featuring Oboy)	2021	—	—	81	Réelle vie 3.0
"La Pégre"	2023	8	—	—	Omerta
"Velar"	2023	12	—	—	Omerta
"B22"	2023	25	—	—	Omerta
"Malembé"	2023	30	—	—	Omerta
"Opaque"	2023	34	—	—	Omerta
"Le Moine"	2023	44	—	—	Omerta
"Frank Lucas"	2023	52	—	—	Omerta
"Criminel"	2023	59	—	—	Omerta
"Intro"	2023	61	—	—	Omerta
"Omerta"	2023	63	—	—	Omerta
"Quand T’es Là"	2023	65	—	—	Omerta
"AraÏ"	2023	72	—	—	Omerta
"Rif"	2023	77	—	—	Omerta
"Haut Et Bas"	2023	80	—	—	Omerta
"BoÎte À Gants"	2023	98	—	—	Omerta
"Interpol"	2024	45	—	—	
