= La dot =

2018 song by Aya Nakamura

Single by Aya Nakamura

from the album Nakamura
- Released: 19 December 2018
- Recorded: 2018
- Length: 3:21
- Label: Rec. 118, Warner Music France
- Songwriters: Aloïs Zandry; Aya Nakamura; Vladimir Boudnikoff
- Producer: Julio Masidi

Aya Nakamura singles chronology
"Copines" (2018)	"La dot" (2018)	"Pookie" (2019)

Music video
- "La dot" on YouTube

"La dot" is a song performed by French and Malian singer Aya Nakamura. It was released on 19 December 2018. The song peaked at number 3 in France and number 32 in Wallonia. The song's music video garnered over 76 million views.

== Charts ==
=== Weekly charts ===
Weekly chart performance for "La dot"
Chart (2019)	Peak position
Belgium (Ultratop 50 Wallonia)	32
France (SNEP)	3
Netherlands (Single Tip)	15
Switzerland (Schweizer Hitparade)	71

=== Year-end charts ===
Year-end chart performance for "La dot"
Chart (2019)	Position
Belgium (Ultratop Urban Wallonia)	37
France (SNEP)	52

== Certifications ==
Certifications for "La dot"
Region	Certification	Certified units/sales
France (SNEP)	Platinum	200,000^{‡}
^{‡} Sales+streaming figures based on certification alone.
