= Jolie nana =

Single by Aya Nakamura

from the album Aya
- Released: 17 July 2020
- Genre: R&B; pop; urban pop
- Length: 2:27
- Label: Rec. 118; Parlophone; Warner Music France
- Songwriter: Aya Nakamura
- Producer: Julio Masidi

Aya Nakamura singles chronology
"40%" (2019)	"Jolie nana" (2020)	"Doudou" (2020)

Music video
- "Jolie nana" on YouTube

"Jolie nana" is a song by the French and Malian singer Aya Nakamura. It was released on 17 July 2020, as the lead single off her third album Aya. The song reached number one in France, the top 10 in Belgium (in both Flanders and Wallonia) and Switzerland, as well as the top 20 in the Netherlands.

== Background and release ==
On 10 July 2020, Nakamura teased the song on her social media and posted a clip from behind the scenes of the music video. 20 minutes dubbed it the song of the summer.

== Music video ==
An accompanying music video was released on 17 July 2020 and was directed by Seb Tulard. It focuses on a group of friends following their boyfriends. Nakamura stars as the main character and assumes the role of a perfect girlfriend. The video also features French actresses Camille Lellouche and Karidja Touré. Filming of the video was partly interrupted by a police chase which took place near the set of the video.

== Commercial performance ==
In its first three days of release, the song surpassed ten million streams on all streaming platforms. It debuted at number one in France. Only two weeks after release, the song was certified Gold in France,

== Charts ==
=== Weekly charts ===
Chart (2020–2021)	Peak position
Belgium (Ultratop 50 Flanders)	8
Belgium (Ultratop 50 Wallonia)	2
France (SNEP)	1
Global Excl. US (Billboard)	148
Germany (Official German Charts)	6
Netherlands (Dutch Top 40)	22
Netherlands (Single Top 100)	18
UK Afrobeats (Official Charts)	17
Switzerland (Schweizer Hitparade)	4

=== Year-end charts ===
Chart (2020)	Position
Belgium (Ultratop Flanders)	63
Belgium (Ultratop Wallonia)	62
France (SNEP)	18
Netherlands (Single Top 100)	97
Switzerland (Schweizer Hitparade)	47

== Certifications ==
Region	Certification	Certified units/sales
Belgium (BRMA)	2× Platinum	80,000^{‡}
Canada (Music Canada)	Gold	40,000^{‡}
France (SNEP)	Diamond	333,333^{‡}
^{‡} Sales+streaming figures based on certification alone.
