= Méchante =

Single by Aya Nakamura

Single by Aya Nakamura
- Released: 16 June 2022
- Recorded: 2022
- Genre: Reggaeton
- Length: 2:52
- Label: Warner Music France; Rec. 118
- Songwriter: Aya Nakamura
- Producer: twinsmanic

Aya Nakamura singles chronology
"Dégaine" (2022)	"Méchante" (2022)	"VIP" (2022)

Music video
- "Méchante" on YouTube

"Méchante" is a song by the French and Malian singer Aya Nakamura. It was released on 16 June 2022.

== Compositions ==
The song was written by Aya Nakamura and produced by twinsmanic.

== Charts ==
Chart performance for "Méchante"
Chart (2022)	Peak position
France (SNEP)	27
Netherlands (Single Tip)	14
