= Baby (Aya Nakamura song) =

Single by Aya Nakamura

from the album DNK
- Released: 12 January 2023
- Recorded: 2023
- Studio: Shiruken Music, Paris
- Genre: Contemporary R&B; urban pop
- Length: 2:47
- Label: Rec. 118; Warner Music France
- Songwriter: Aya Nakamura
- Producer: Max et Seny

Aya Nakamura singles chronology
"SMS" (2022)	"Baby" (2023)	"DJO" (2023)

Music video
- "Baby" on YouTube

"Baby" is a song by French and Malian singer Aya Nakamura. It was released on 12 January 2023.

== Charts ==
=== Weekly charts ===
Weekly chart performance for "Baby"
Chart (2023)	Peak position
Belgium (Ultratop 50 Wallonia)	8
France (SNEP)	2
Luxembourg (Billboard)	15
Netherlands (Single Tip)	14
Switzerland (Schweizer Hitparade)	22

=== Year-end charts ===
Year-end chart performance for "Baby"
Chart (2023)	Position
Belgium (Ultratop Wallonia)	71
France (SNEP)	16

== Certifications ==
Certifications for "Baby"
Region	Certification	Certified units/sales
France (SNEP)	Platinum	200,000^{‡}
^{‡} Sales+streaming figures based on certification alone.
