= Copines =

2018 song by Aya Nakamura

Single by Aya Nakamura

from the album Nakamura
- Released: 24 August 2018
- Recorded: Spring–summer 2016
- Genre: R&B; pop; reggaeton
- Length: 2:50
- Label: Rec. 118, Parlophone
- Songwriters: Julio Masidi; Aya Nakamura
- Producer: Julio Masidi

Aya Nakamura singles chronology
"Djadja" (2018)	"Copines" (2018)	"La dot" (2018)

Music video
- "Copines" on YouTube

"Copines" (pronounced [kɔpin];eng: friends) is a song performed by French and Malian singer Aya Nakamura. It was released on 24 August 2018. The song peaked at number one in France and number 7 in Wallonia. "Copines' also went viral on Instagram Reels in early 2021 after spawning a dance trend. The song also gained significant traction on TikTok, accumulating over 17.6 million video creations as of April 2026, ranking among the top 50 most-used songs on the platform worldwide.

== Music video ==
A music video for the song was released on the same day as the song, and was filmed in Guadeloupe. As of July 2026, the video has over 727 million views on YouTube.

== Charts ==
=== Weekly charts ===
Weekly chart performance for "Copines"
Chart (2018–2026)	Peak position
Belgium (Ultratip Bubbling Under Flanders)	24
Belgium (Ultratop 50 Wallonia)	7
France (SNEP)	1
Netherlands (Single Top 100)	46
Portugal (AFP)	97
Singapore (RIAS)	28
Sweden Heatseeker (Sverigetopplistan)	14
Switzerland (Schweizer Hitparade)	60

=== Year-end charts ===
Year-end chart performance for "Copines"
Chart (2018)	Position
Belgium (Ultratop Wallonia)	98
France (SNEP)	24

== Certifications ==
Certifications for "Copines"
Region	Certification	Certified units/sales
Belgium (BRMA)	Gold	20,000^{‡}
Canada (Music Canada)	Platinum	80,000^{‡}
Denmark (IFPI Danmark)	Gold	45,000^{‡}
France (SNEP)	Diamond	333,333^{‡}
Italy (FIMI)	Gold	35,000^{‡}
New Zealand (RMNZ)	Gold	15,000^{‡}
Poland (ZPAV)	Platinum	50,000^{‡}
Portugal (AFP)	Gold	5,000^{‡}
Spain (Promusicae)	Gold	30,000^{‡}
United Kingdom (BPI)	Silver	200,000^{‡}
^{‡} Sales+streaming figures based on certification alone.
