= 13 Block =

French hip hop group

- Origin: Sevran, Seine-Saint-Denis, France
- Genre: Drill music
- Years active: 2012–present
- Members: Malcolm "Zed" Botomba; Romuald "Stavo" Gomes; Aimé "OldPee" Kalombo Mpiana; Cyril "Zefor" Lobe Ndame

13 Block is a French hip hop group originating from Sevran, Seine-Saint-Denis. It was formed in 2012, and is made up of the artists Stavo, Zed, Zefor and OldPee, all from the Beaudottes area in Sevran. It is inspired by American drill from Chicago and trap from Atlanta. They have released two albums and a number of mixtapes.

== Discography ==
=== Studio albums ===
Title	Year	Peak positions				Certification
Title	Year	FRA	BEL (Fl)	BEL (Wa)	SWI	Certification
BLO	2019	5	—	15	31	
BLO II	2020	12	181	17	33	

=== Mixtapes ===
Title	Year	Peak positions		Certification
Title	Year	FRA	BEL (Wa)	Certification
Violence Urbaine Émeute	2016	163	—	
ULTRAP	2016	150	—	
Triple S	2018	39	74	

=== Singles ===
Title	Year	Peak positions		Album
Title	Year	FRA	BEL (Wa)	Album
"Somme"	2017	188	—	
"Vide"	2017	125	—	
"Balayer"	2018	154	—	
"Zidane"	2018	102	—	BLO
"Faut que"	2019	110	—	BLO
"Tieks" (feat. Niska)	2020	18	16* (Ultratip)	BLO II
"Babi"	2020	42	33* (Ultratip)	BLO II

*Did not appear in the official Belgian Ultratop 50 charts, but rather in the bubbling under Ultratip charts.

=== Featured in ===
Title	Year	Peak positions		Album
Title	Year	FRA	BEL (Wa)	Album
"Clic clac" (Hamza feat. 13 Block)	2019	64	25* (Ultratip)	
"On ira" (Soolking feat. 13 Block)	2020	174	—	

*Did not appear in the official Belgian Ultratop 50 charts, but rather in the bubbling under Ultratip charts.

=== Other songs ===
Title	Year	Peak positions		Album
Title	Year	FRA	BEL (Wa)	Album
"Calibre"	2018	193	—	
"Amis d'avant"	2019	76	—	BLO
"Petit cœur"	2019	64	—	BLO
"Fuck le 17"	2019	25	39* (Ultratip)	BLO
"Où je vais"	2019	82	—	BLO
"CR"	2019	88	—	BLO
"Ghetto"	2019	89	—	BLO
"Pas vu pas pris"	2019	119	—	BLO
"Binks 2.0"	2019	121	—	BLO
"93 Gangstérisme"	2019	123	—	BLO
"Métagorique"	2019	154	—	BLO
"Pente noire"	2019	160	—	BLO
"Si j'avais"	2019	163	—	BLO
"Bombarder"	2019	184	—	BLO
"Boîte 6 40 kil"	2020	125	—	Non-album release
"Riina Toto" (feat. Maes)	2020	32	—	BLO II
"Pavel" (feat. SCH)	2020	65	—	BLO II
"Aminata" (feat. PLK)	2020	71	—	BLO II
"Kobe" (feat. Zola)	2020	74	—	BLO II
"Akira"	2020	107	—	BLO II
"Les dodanes"	2020	111	—	BLO II
"Heps ou Plata"	2020	114	—	BLO II
"Diplomatico"	2020	134	—	BLO II
"La ramasse"	2020	146	—	BLO II
"Bendo"	2020	166	—	BLO II
"Oiseaux"	2020	168	—	BLO II
"Énervé"	2020	189	—	BLO II

*Did not appear in the official Belgian Ultratop 50 charts, but rather in the bubbling under Ultratip charts.
