= 42 (Aya Nakamura song) =

Single by Aya Nakamura
- Released: 19 June 2024
- Recorded: 2024
- Genre: Latin pop; reggae; R&B
- Length: 2:56
- Label: Nakamura Industrie; Rec. 118
- Songwriter: Aya Nakamura
- Producers: Antoine Klein, Seysey, Max et Seny, Starow, Chris Mouyenne

Aya Nakamura singles chronology
"Doggy" (2024)	"42" (2024)	"Chimiyé" (2025)

Music video
- "42" on YouTube

"42" is a song by French and Malian singer Aya Nakamura. It was released on 19 June 2024. Written and produced by Antoine Klein, Seysey, Max et Seny, Starow and Chris Mouyenne, "42" is a Latin pop, reggae and R&B song. The song's music video has amassed over 9.5 million views on YouTube.

== Charts ==
Chart performance for "42"
Chart (2024)	Peak position
France (SNEP)	26
France Overseas Airplay (SNEP)	21
