= Djadja (song) =

Single by Aya Nakamura

from the album Nakamura
- Released: 6 April 2018
- Recorded: 2017–2018
- Length: 2:50
- Label: Parlophone; Rec. 118
- Songwriters: Aya Nakamura; Le Side

Aya Nakamura singles chronology
"Le Passé" (2018)	"Djadja" (2018)	"Copines" (2018)

Loredana singles chronology
"Djadja" (remix) (2018)	"Sonnenbrille" (2018)

Afro B singles chronology
"Pull Up" (2018)	"Djadja" (remix) (2018)	"Dorgba (Joanna)" (2018)

Maluma singles chronology
"ADMV" (2020)	"Djadja" (remix) (2020)	"Feel the Beat" (2020)

Music video
- "Djadja" on YouTube

"Djadja" is a song by French and Malian singer Aya Nakamura, released on 6 April 2018, as the lead single off her second studio album Nakamura (2018). It reached number one in France, the Netherlands and Romania. The music video for the song was shot in Barcelona, Spain.

On 7 April 2018, two official remixes of the song were released, one featuring Swiss-Kosovan rapper Loredana Zefi and the other featuring British singer Afro B. The third remix featuring Colombian singer Maluma was released on June 12, 2020. In November 2020, Nakamura and Maluma performed the remix live for the MTV Europe Music Awards from separate places due to the COVID-19 restrictions.

In July 2026, the song became a viral audio on the social media app TikTok, with users adding clips of the song’s music video to humorous videos related to the French language.

== Charts ==
=== Weekly charts ===
Chart (2018–2020)	Peak position
Argentina (Argentina Hot 100) Remix featuring Maluma	26
Belgium (Ultratop 50 Flanders)	16
Belgium (Ultratop 50 Wallonia)	16
CIS Airplay (TopHit)	24
Colombia (National-Report) Remix featuring Maluma	35
France (SNEP)	1
Germany (GfK)	43
Global 200 (Billboard) Remix featuring Maluma	57
Greece (IFPI)	15
Hungary (Single Top 40)	30
Israel (Media Forest)	2
Italy (FIMI) Remix featuring Maluma	23
Netherlands (Dutch Top 40)	1
Netherlands (Single Top 100)	1
Portugal (AFP)	37
Paraguay (SGP) Remix featuring Maluma	25
Romania (Airplay 100)	1
Romania TV Airplay (Media Forest)	1
Russia Airplay (TopHit)	20
Spain (PROMUSICAE)	5
Sweden (Sverigetopplistan)	72
Switzerland (Schweizer Hitparade)	29
US Hot Latin Songs (Billboard) Remix featuring Maluma	43

Chart (2024)	Peak position
US World Digital Song Sales (Billboard)	6
France (SNEP)	100

=== Year-end charts ===
Chart (2018)	Position
Belgium (Ultratop Flanders)	68
Belgium (Ultratop Wallonia)	20
France (SNEP)	4
Netherlands (Dutch Top 40)	34
Netherlands (Single Top 100)	5
Portugal Full Track Download (AFP)	71
Romania (Airplay 100)	68
Switzerland (Schweizer Hitparade)	75

Chart (2019)	Position
France (SNEP)	187
Portugal (AFP)	127
Romania (Airplay 100)	34

Chart (2020)	Position
France (SNEP)	108
Italy (FIMI)	69
Spain (PROMUSICAE)	18

== Certifications ==
Region	Certification	Certified units/sales
Austria (IFPI Austria)	Gold	15,000^{‡}
Belgium (BRMA)	4× Platinum	160,000^{‡}
Canada (Music Canada)	3× Platinum	240,000^{‡}
Denmark (IFPI Danmark)	Gold	45,000^{‡}
France (SNEP)	Diamond	333,333^{‡}
Germany (BVMI)	Gold	200,000^{‡}
Italy (FIMI)	2× Platinum	140,000^{‡}
Netherlands (NVPI)	2× Platinum	160,000^{‡}
Poland (ZPAV)	Gold	25,000^{‡}
Portugal (AFP)	Platinum	10,000^{‡}
Spain (Promusicae)	4× Platinum	160,000^{‡}
Switzerland (IFPI Switzerland)	Gold	10,000^{‡}
United Kingdom (BPI)	Gold	400,000^{‡}
United States (RIAA)	Gold	500,000^{‡}
^{‡} Sales+streaming figures based on certification alone.

== See also ==
- List of Airplay 100 number ones of the 2010s
