= Madrina =

Single by Maes featuring Booba

from the album Pure
- Language: French
- Released: 2018
- Length: 4:38
- Label: Def Jam Recordings France
- Songwriters: Maes; Booba
- Producer: Maes

Maes featuring Booba singles chronology
| "Billets verts" (2018) | "Madrina" (2018) | "Rude" (2019) |

Music video
- "Madrina" on YouTube

"Madrina" is a song by Maes released in 2018. The song peaked at number-one on the French Singles Chart and featured vocals from French rapper Booba.

== Charts ==
Chart performance for "Madrina"
| Chart (2018) | Peak position |
|---|---|
| Belgium (Ultratop 50 Wallonia) | 31 |
| France (SNEP) | 1 |
| Switzerland (Schweizer Hitparade) | 49 |
