= Bobo (Aya Nakamura song) =

Single by Aya Nakamura

Single by Aya Nakamura
- Released: 27 May 2021
- Recorded: 2021
- Genre: Dancehall; Afrobeats; R&B; reggae
- Length: 3:07
- Label: Warner Music France; Rec. 118
- Songwriters: Aya Nakamura; Some-1ne
- Producer: Vladimir Boudnikoff

Aya Nakamura singles chronology
"Fly" (2021)	"Bobo" (2021)	"C'est cuit" (2021)

Music video
- "Bobo" on YouTube

"Bobo" is a song by French and Malian singer and songwriter Aya Nakamura, released on 27 May 2021. It reached the top three in France and top 20 in Switzerland.

== Charts ==
=== Weekly charts ===
Weekly chart performance for "Bobo"
Chart (2021)	Peak position
Belgium (Ultratop 50 Wallonia)	23
France (SNEP)	3
Netherlands (Single Top 100)	67
Portugal (AFP)	163
Switzerland (Schweizer Hitparade)	16

=== Year-end charts ===
Year-end chart performance for "Bobo"
Chart (2021)	Position
France (SNEP)	59

== Certifications ==
Certifications for "Bobo"
Region	Certification	Certified units/sales
France (SNEP)	Platinum	200,000^{‡}
^{‡} Sales+streaming figures based on certification alone.
