= Nakamura (album) =

- Deluxe artwork (Note: The standard artwork uses the same image but with yellow background and text, plus the small Japanese word "Nakamura".)

Studio album by Aya Nakamura
- Released: 2 November 2018
- Recorded: 2017–2018
- Studios: 910 (Laval); Ciel Bleu (Paris); Marceau (Paris); Most (Seine-Saint-Denis); Perspective Production; Twins (Paris); Vova (Rosny-sous-Bois); De La Seine (Paris)
- Genres: Urban pop; R&B; dancehall; soul
- Length: 57:07
- Labels: Rec. 118; Warner Music France
- Producers: Vladimir Boudnikoff; Aloïs Zandry

Aya Nakamura chronology
Journal intime (2017)	Nakamura (2018)	Aya (2020)

Singles from Nakamura
- 1. "Djadja" Released: 6 April 2018; 2. "Copines" Released: 24 August 2018; 3. "La dot" Released: 19 December 2018; 4. "Pookie" Released: 10 April 2019; 5. "Soldat" Released: 13 September 2019; 6. "40%" Released: 22 November 2019

Nakamura is the second studio album by French and Malian singer Aya Nakamura. It was released on 2 November 2018 through Warner Music France. A deluxe edition was also released on 25 October 2019.

The album features guest appearances by Davido, Maluma and Niska. It was preceded by six singles, which are: "Djadja", "Copines", "La Dot", "Pookie", "Soldat" and "40%" all of which reached the top 10 in Nakamura's home country France. "Copines" also went viral on Instagram Reels in early 2021 after spawning a dance trend.

== Track listing ==
Nakamura — Standard edition
No.	Title	Writer(s)	Producer(s)	Length
1.	"La dot"	Aya Nakamura	Aloïs Zandry; Vladimir Boudnikoff	3:22
2.	"Djadja"	Nakamura	Aloïs Zandry; Vladimir Boudnikoff	2:51
3.	"Pompom"	Nakamura	Aloïs Zandry; Vladimir Boudnikoff	3:11
4.	"Copines"	Nakamura	Aloïs Zandry; Vladimir Boudnikoff	2:52
5.	"Pookie"	Nakamura; Archibald Smith	Aloïs Zandry; Vladimir Boudnikoff	3:01
6.	"Ça fait mal"	Nakamura	Aloïs Zandry; Vladimir Boudnikoff	2:34
7.	"Faya"	Nakamura	Aloïs Zandry; Vladimir Boudnikoff	2:47
8.	"Gangster"	Nakamura	Aloïs Zandry; Vladimir Boudnikoff	3:09
9.	"Sucette" (featuring Niska)	Nakamura; Niska	Aloïs Zandry; Vladimir Boudnikoff	2:47
10.	"Whine Up"	Nakamura	Aloïs Zandry; Vladimir Boudnikoff	3:19
11.	"Gang" (featuring Davido)	Nakamura; Davido	Aloïs Zandry; Vladimir Boudnikoff	3:31
12.	"Dans ma bulle"	Nakamura	Aloïs Zandry; Vladimir Boudnikoff	2:38
13.	"Oula"	Nakamura	Aloïs Zandry; Vladimir Boudnikoff	2:39
Total length:				38:41

Nakamura — Deluxe edition
No.	Title	Writer(s)	Producer(s)	Length
14.	"Soldat"	Nakamura; Haristone	Aloïs Zandry; Vladimir Boudnikoff	3:05
15.	"Idiot"	Nakamura	Aloïs Zandry; Vladimir Boudnikoff	2:46
16.	"40%"	Nakamura	Aloïs Zandry; Vladimir Boudnikoff	2:55
17.	"Claqué"	Nakamura	Aloïs Zandry; Vladimir Boudnikoff	2:36
18.	"Sucette (Remix)" (featuring Niska)	Nakamura; Niska	Aloïs Zandry; Vladimir Boudnikoff	4:17
19.	"Djadja (Remix)" (featuring Maluma)	Nakamura; Edgar Barrera; Stiven Rojas; Vicente Barco	Aloïs Zandry; Vladimir Boudnikoff	2:47
Total length:				57:07

== Charts ==
=== Weekly charts ===
Weekly chart performance for Nakamura
Chart (2018–19)	Peak position
Belgian Albums (Ultratop Flanders)	29
Belgian Albums (Ultratop Wallonia)	8
Dutch Albums (Album Top 100)	10
French Albums (SNEP)	3
Italian Albums (FIMI)	90
Spanish Albums (Promusicae)	92
Swiss Albums (Schweizer Hitparade)	19

=== Year-end charts ===
2018 year-end chart performance for Nakamura
Chart (2018)	Position
Belgian Albums (Ultratop Wallonia)	67
French Albums (SNEP)	24

2019 year-end chart performance for Nakamura
Chart (2019)	Position
Belgian Albums (Ultratop Flanders)	64
Belgian Albums (Ultratop Wallonia)	14
French Albums (SNEP)	10
Dutch Albums (Album Top 100)	48

2020 year-end chart performance for Nakamura
Chart (2020)	Position
Belgian Albums (Ultratop Flanders)	90
Belgian Albums (Ultratop Wallonia)	21
French Albums (SNEP)	26
Dutch Albums (Album Top 100)	98

2021 year-end chart performance for Nakamura
Chart (2021)	Position
Belgian Albums (Ultratop Wallonia)	72
French Albums (SNEP)	91

2022 year-end chart performance for Nakamura
Chart (2022)	Position
Belgian Albums (Ultratop Wallonia)	109

2025 year-end chart performance for Nakamura
Chart (2025)	Position
Belgian Albums (Ultratop Wallonia)	107

== Certifications and sales ==
Region	Certification	Certified units/sales
Belgium (BRMA)	Platinum	20,000^{‡}
Canada (Music Canada)	Gold	40,000^{‡}
Denmark (IFPI Danmark)	Gold	10,000^{‡}
France (SNEP)	Diamond	500,000^{‡}
Italy (FIMI)	Platinum	50,000^{‡}
^{‡} Sales+streaming figures based on certification alone.
