= Dégaine =

Single by Aya Nakamura

Single by Aya Nakamura featuring Damso
- Released: 9 March 2022
- Recorded: 2022
- Genre: Zouk; kompa
- Length: 3:31
- Label: Warner Music France; Rec. 118
- Songwriters: Aya Nakamura; Damso; Machynist
- Producer: Bleu Nuit

Aya Nakamura singles chronology
"C'est cuit" (2021)	"Dégaine" (2022)	"Méchante" (2022)

Damso singles chronology
"Démons" (2021)	"Dégaine" (2022)	"Rencontre" (2022)

Music video
- "Dégaine" on YouTube

"Dégaine" is a song by French and Malian singer Aya Nakamura featuring Belgian rapper Damso. It was released on 9 March 2022. It debuted atop the French Single Chart, becoming her fifth number one.

== Compositions ==
"Dégaine" is a song with kizomba and kompa influences. It was written by Aya Nakamura and Damso and produced by Bleu Nuit.

== Charts ==
=== Weekly charts ===
Weekly chart performance for "Dégaine"
Chart (2022)	Peak position
Belgium (Ultratop 50 Wallonia)	15
France (SNEP)	1
Luxembourg (Billboard)	17
Netherlands (Single Tip)	19
Switzerland (Schweizer Hitparade)	19
UK Afrobeats Singles (OCC)	13

=== Year-end charts ===
Year-end chart performance for "Dégaine"
Chart (2022)	Position
Belgium (Ultratop Wallonia)	74
France (SNEP)	22

== Certifications ==
Certifications for "Dégaine"
Region	Certification	Certified units/sales
Canada (Music Canada)	Gold	40,000^{‡}
France (SNEP)	Diamond	333,333^{‡}
^{‡} Sales+streaming figures based on certification alone.
