= Fly (Aya Nakamura song) =

Single by Aya Nakamura

from the album Aya
- Released: 17 March 2021
- Recorded: 2020
- Genre: Soul; R&B
- Length: 3:37
- Label: Rec. 118; Parlophone; Warner Music France
- Songwriters: Aya Nakamura; Aloïs Zandry; Machynist; Ever Mihigo
- Producer: Vladimir Boudnikoff

Aya Nakamura singles chronology
"C'est cuit" (2021)	"Fly" (2021)	"Bobo" (2021)

Music video
- "Fly" on YouTube

"Fly" is a song by French and Malian singer Aya Nakamura. It was released as the fourth single from her second studio album Aya on 17 March 2021.

== Charts ==
Chart performance for "Fly"
Charts	Peak position
France (SNEP)	8

== Certifications ==
Certifications for "Fly"
Region	Certification	Certified units/sales
France (SNEP)	Gold	100,000^{‡}
^{‡} Sales+streaming figures based on certification alone.
