= Koba LaD =

French rapper

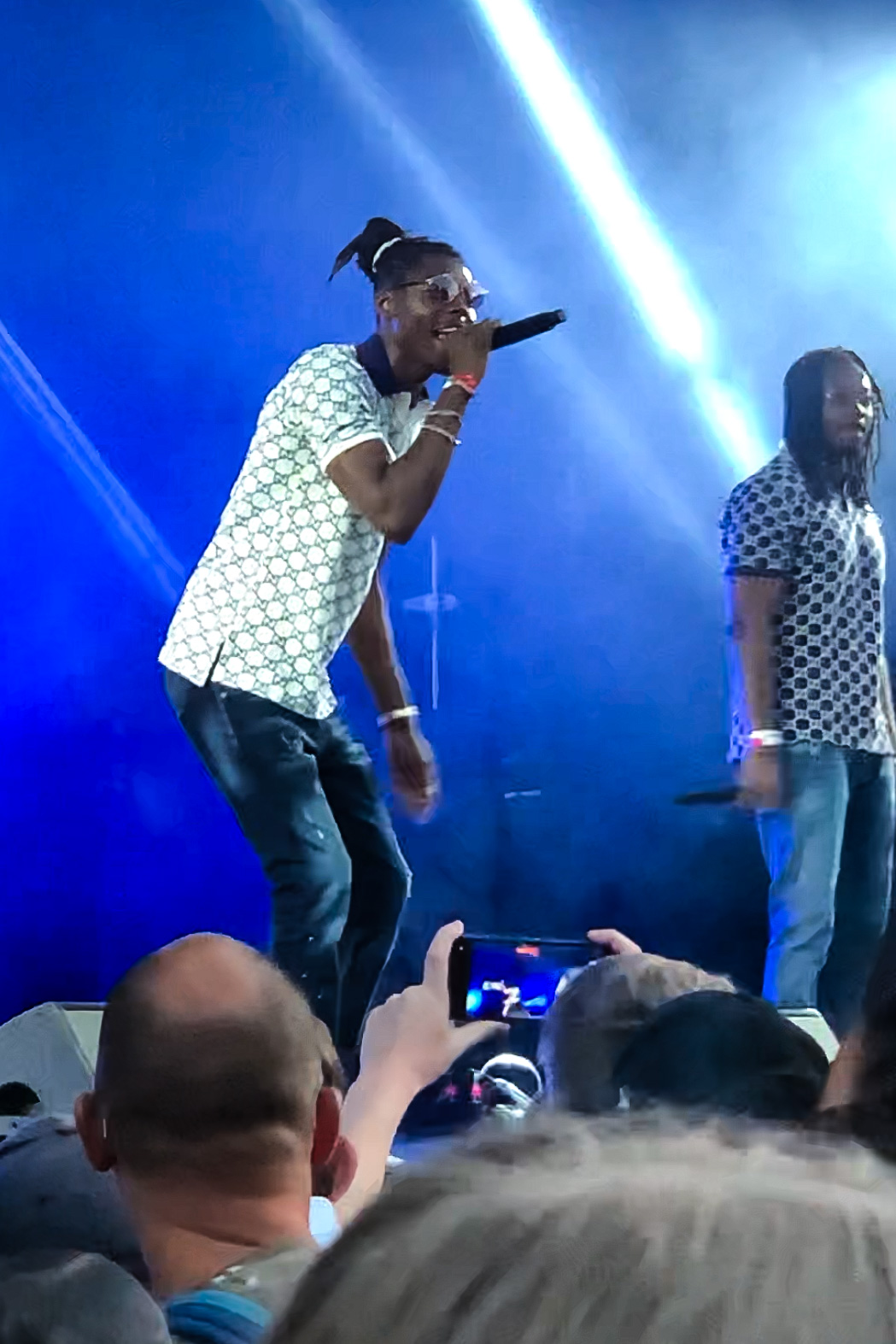

Background information
- Born: Marcel Junior Loutarila; April 3, 2000 (age 26); Saint-Denis, Seine-Saint-Denis , Île-de-France, France
- Origin: Evry, Ile de France
- Genres: Hip hop; trap; drill
- Occupation: Rapper
- Years active: 2015-present
- Labels: BMF Entertainment Corp, Epic Records

Marcel Junior Loutarila (French pronunciation: [maʁsɛl ʒynjɔʁ lutaʁila]; April 3, 2000 (age 26), better known as Koba LaD (pronounced [kɔba la de]), is a French rapper from Évry, Île-de-France. He grew up in the famous Parc aux lièvres neighborhood in Évry, where the Bâtiment 7 is located, and where other artists such as Bolémvn come from.

His name Koba is inspired from the fictional character in Planet of the Apes. "LaD" means 'la débrouille, la détaille, la défonce' (the struggle, selling drugs, being high). He is signed with Def Jam Recordings.

== Discography ==
=== Albums ===
Title	Year	Peak positions			
Title	Year	FRA	BEL (Fl)	BEL (Wa)	SWI
VII	2018	3	94	2	20
L'Affranchi	2019	3	83	6	13
Détail	2020	3	26	4	12
Cartel Vol. 1 & 2	2021	9	–	8	55
Frères ennemis (with Zola)	2024	1	—	2	3

=== EPs ===
Title	Year	Peak positions
Title	Year	FRA
Ténébreux	2018	82

=== Singles ===
==== As lead artist ====
Title	Year	Peak positions			Album
Title	Year	FRA	BEL (Wa)	SWI	Album
"Train de vie"	2018	8	41	–	VII
"La C"	2018	5	49	–	VII
"Oyé"	2018	24	5* (Ultratip)	–	VII
"Aventador"	2019	26	11* (Ultratip)	–	
"FeFe"	2019	29	11* (Ultratip)	–	
"R44"	2019	34	23* (Ultratip)	–	
"EDC"	2019	36	–	–	L'affranchi
"Cellophané"	2019	36	17* (Ultratip)	–	L'affranchi
"RR 9.1" (feat. Niska)	2019	3	25	75	L'affranchi
"Four"	2019	26	17* (Ultratip)	–	
"Sankhara #4 (Chic)" (with Bolémvn)	2019	39	–	–	
"Mortel"	2019	15	–		
"Ca ira mieux demain"	2020	15	–	–	
"Laisse tomber"	2020	55	25* (Ultratip)	–	
"Ohlolo"	2020	46	18* (Ultratip)	–	Non-album singles
"Beldia"	2020	114	–	–	Non-album singles
"7 sur 7" (feat. Freeze Corleone)	2020	5	19	42	Détail
"Coffre plein" (feat. Maes & Zed)	2020	2	7	19	Détail
"DouDou" (feat. Naps)	2021	4	–	–	
"Aller sans retour" (with Zola)	2023	14	38	–	Frères ennemis
"Temps en temps" (with Zola featuring Kore)	2024	3	10	–	Frères ennemis
"Amiri Jeans" (with Zola)	2024	9	41	–	
"911" (with Ninho and Niska)	2024	6	49	–	

*Did not appear in the official Belgian Ultratop 50 charts, but rather in the bubbling under Ultratip charts.

==== As featured artist ====
Title	Year	Peak positions		Album
Title	Year	FRA	BEL (Wa)	Album
"Chargé" (GLK feat. RK & Koba LaD)	2018	65	—	
"George Moula" (Heuss l'Enfoiré feat. Koba LaD)	2019	21	21* (Ultratip)	En Esprit (Heuss l'Enfoiré album)
"La vivance" (Ninho feat. Koba LaD)	2019	11	—	Destin (Ninho album)
"La patate" (RK feat. Koba LaD)	2019	98	—	
"Binks" (100 Blaze feat. Koba LaD)	2019	16	2* (Ultratip)	
"Tous les couler" (Niska feat. Koba LaD)	2019	10	—	Mr Sal (Niska album)
"TPB" (Dadju feat. Koba LaD)	2019	11	—	Poison (Dadju album)
"The Wire" (Gradur feat. Koba LaD)	2019	11	—	Zone 59 (Gradur album)
"Tout est calé" (Chily feat. Koba LaD)	2020	28	11* (Ultratip)	Non-album song
"Valise" (Rim'k feat. Koba LaD & SCH)	2020	46	12* (Ultratip)	
"Titulaires" (SDM feat. Koba LaD)	2020	52	—	
"Poursuite" (ZKR feat. Koba LaD)	2020	71	—	
"Grand Paris 2" (Médine feat. Koba LaD, Pirate, Larry, Oxmo Puccino & Rémy)"	2020	51	—	
"Trop dedans" (Denzo feat. Koba LaD)	2021	83	—	
"Maxi boule" (Bolémvn feat. Koba LaD)	2021	135	—	
"Immonde" (Leto feat. Koba LaD)	2023	43	—	

*Did not appear in the official Belgian Ultratop 50 charts, but rather in the bubbling under Ultratip charts.

=== Other charted songs ===
Title	Year	Peak positions			Album
Title	Year	FRA	BEL (Wa)	SWI	Album
"J'encaisse"	2018	84	—	—	Non-album song
"Moments durs"	2018	10	—	—	VII
"Chambre 122"	2018	11	—	—	VII
"Honey"	2018	18	—	—	VII
"Suge"	2018	26	—	—	VII
"Everyday"	2018	33	—	—	VII
"Tout"	2018	34	—	—	VII
"Recul"	2018	39	—	—	VII
"Intro"	2018	42	—	—	VII
"Rachète"	2018	57	—	—	VII
"J'en veux"	2018	76	—	—	VII
"Seven Binks" (feat. Mafia Spartiate & Bolémvn)	2018	32	—	—	VII
"Orgueilleux"	2018	141	—	—	Non-album song
"Quotidien" (feat. Ninho)	2019	14	—	—	L'Affranchi
"Matin" (feat. Maes)	2019	23	17* (Ultratip)	—	L'Affranchi
"Koba du 7"	2019	55	—	—	L'Affranchi
"C'est moi"	2019	68	—	—	L'Affranchi
"Amitiés gâchées"	2019	69	—	—	L'Affranchi
"Quadrillé"	2019	75	—	—	L'Affranchi
"Demain j'arrête"	2019	77	—	—	L'Affranchi
"Pour toi"	2019	78	—	—	L'Affranchi
"Mélange"	2019	80	—	—	L'Affranchi
"Quand j'étais petit"	2019	81	—	—	L'Affranchi
"Le magot"	2019	90	—	—	L'Affranchi
"Guedro"	2019	99	—	—	L'Affranchi
"O.G"	2019	116	—	—	L'Affranchi
"Marie"	2019	16	7* (Ultratip)	—	Non-album song
"La détail"	2019	108	—	—	Non-album song
"Pas comme les autres"	2019	191	—	—	Non-album song
"Smic" (with Bolémvn)	2020	193	—	—	Vol 169 (Bolémvn album)
"Encore" (with Ninho)	2020	4	—	—	Détail
"Pas de reine" (with Vald)	2020	5	—	—	Détail
"Omar" (with PLK)	2020	17	—	—	Détail
"En gros"	2020	26	—	—	Détail
"Dans l'avion"	2020	30	—	—	Détail
"5h55"	2020	32	—	—	Détail
"Chambre d'hôtel"	2020	35	—	—	Détail
"Cité"	2020	36	—	—	Détail
"Helsinki"	2020	42	—	—	Détail
"Bedodo"	2020	50	—	—	Détail
"Feu éteints"	2020	54	—	—	Détail
"Céramique"	2020	55	—	—	Détail
"Déclic"	2020	61	—	—	Détail
"Tue ça" (feat. SDM, Guy2Bezbar)	2021	30	—	—	Cartel vol. 1
"Daddy chocolat" (with Gazo)	2021	2	29	72	Cartel vol. 1
"Cramé" (with Oboy)	2021	22	—	—	Cartel vol. 1
"Batards" (with Laylow)	2021	99	—	—	Cartel vol. 1
"Chercher l'or" (with ZKR & Landy)	2021	103	—	—	Cartel vol. 1
"M Power"	2021	130	—	—	Cartel vol. 1
"Nintch"	2021	72	—	—	
"Synthese"	2024	34	—	—	Frères ennemis
"C'est non" (with Zola)	2024	37	—	—	Frères ennemis
"Parano" (with Zola)	2024	42	—	—	Frères ennemis
"Un billet" (with Zola)	2024	43	—	—	Frères ennemis
"Mexicana" (with Zola)	2024	50	—	—	Frères ennemis
"Roulette Russe" (with Zola)	2024	52	—	—	Frères ennemis
"Dans la nuit" (with Zola)	2024	58	—	—	Frères ennemis
"Frères ennemis" (with Zola)	2024	61	—	—	Frères ennemis

*Did not appear in the official Belgian Ultratop 50 charts, but rather in the bubbling under Ultratip charts.
