= Aya Nakamura =

French and Malian singer (born 1995)

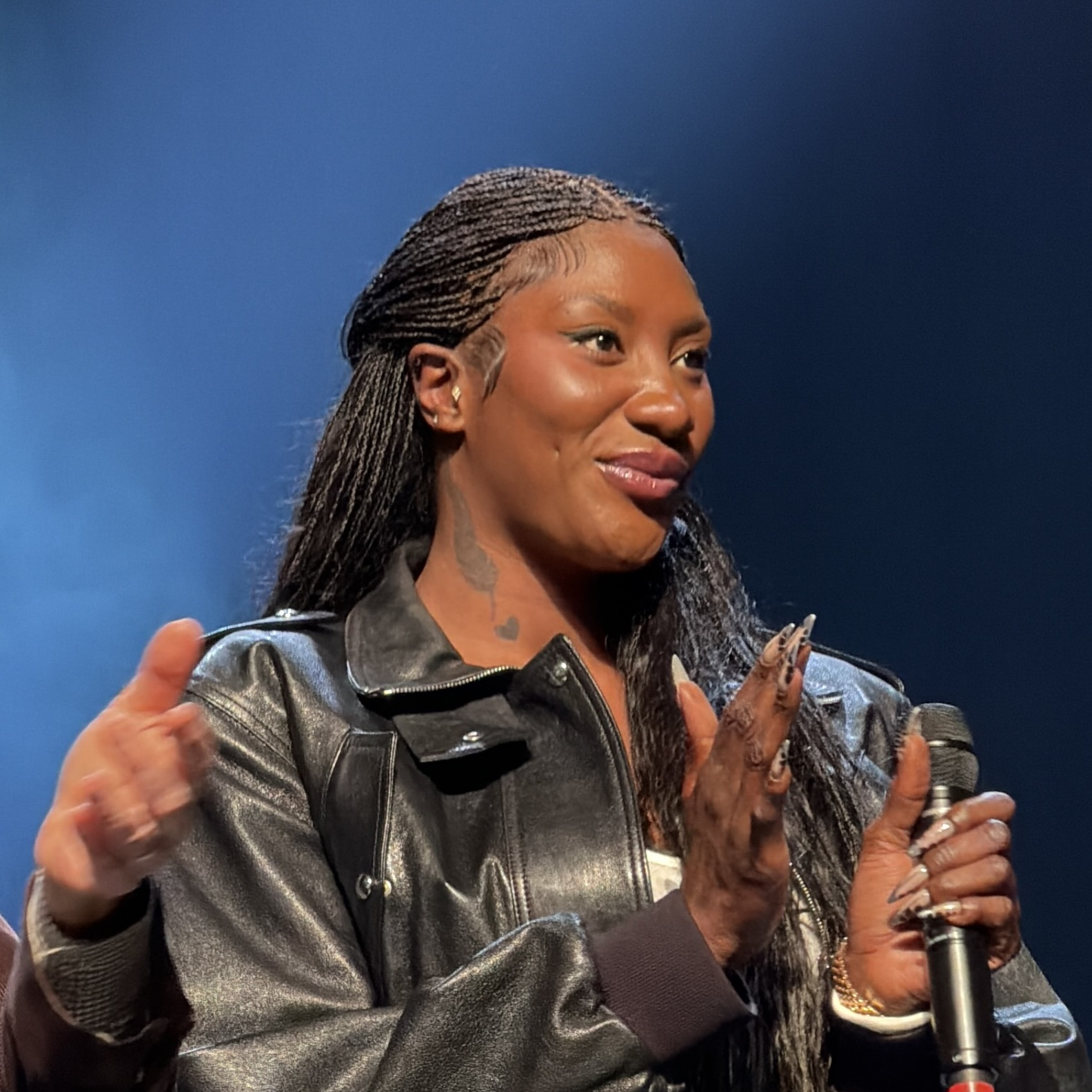
- Nakamura in 2026
- Born: Aya Coco Danioko; 10 May 1995 (age 31); Bamako, Mali
- Citizenship: Mali; France
- Occupations: Singer; songwriter
- Years active: 2014–present
- Partner: RK
- Children: 2
- Musical career
- Origin: Paris, France
- Genres: Pop; Afrobeats; Afro-pop; zouk; R&B
- Instrument: Vocals
- Labels: Rec. 118; Parlophone; Warner Music France

Aya Coco Danioko (born 10 May 1995), known professionally as Aya Nakamura (French: [aja nakamuʁa]), is a French and Malian singer-songwriter. She began publishing her music online in 2014, gaining a following with the songs "Karma" and "J'ai mal". Dembo Camara, a longtime friend, became her producer and manager. Her song "Brisé" gained traction on YouTube, and a duet with rapper Fababy, "Love d'un voyou", resulted in her charting in France for the first time. She released her debut album, Journal intime, in 2017, followed in 2018 by Nakamura, which was certified diamond in France and has sold more than 1.2 million copies worldwide. The album spawned the hit singles "Djadja" and "Copines" and launched the singer's international career. The same year, she beat the record held by Édith Piaf since 1961 as the most-listened-to francophone woman in the Netherlands.

Nakamura has accumulated six number-one songs and two number-one albums in France. She was awarded a Victoires de la Musique award for her 2020 album, Aya, which was certified double platinum in 2023, having sold 200,000 copies. She also won an NRJ Music Award and received multiple nominations for the MTV Europe Music Award for Best French Act. Two years after its release, Nakamura surpassed a billion streams on Spotify, making the singer the most-listened-to francophone woman on the platform.

On 23 February 2025, the video for Nakamura's single "Djadja" became the fourth French-language song to surpass a billion views on YouTube, behind Indila's "Dernière danse", Stromae's "Papaoutai", and Willy William's "Ego". She is the first African musician to have a video with over a billion views, and she is the fastest French-speaking artist to reach this milestone in six years.

== Early life ==
Aya Coco Danioko was born in Bamako, Mali, on 10 May 1995, the oldest of five siblings, from a family of griots—West African storytellers, praise singers, and poets of oral traditions. She emigrated to France with her family as a child and grew up in Aulnay-sous-Bois. She applied for French nationality as an adult, which was granted to her in May 2021.

Danioko studied fashion in La Courneuve. In a 2017 interview with Le Monde, she stated, "I wanted to be a fashion designer, but that stopped appealing to me, so I sang". She later pivoted into a music career and adopted the stage name Aya Nakamura, deriving the last name from the character Hiro Nakamura of the American science fiction television series Heroes.

== Career ==
=== 2014–2017: Journal intime ===
In 2014, at the age of 19, Nakamura released her first single, "Karma", on Facebook. With the help of producer Seysey, she composed the breakup song "J'ai mal", with a zouk-inspired melody.

In 2016, she made the song "Brisé" with composer Christopher Ghenda. She followed it with "Love d'un Voyou", featuring rapper Fababy. She performed at the Modibo-Keïta stadium in Bamako, opening for American-Nigerian star Davido.

In January 2016, she signed a deal with Rec. 118 and Parlophone, a subsidiary of Warner Music France. The same year, she released the single "Super Héros", featuring rapper Gradur.

On 25 August 2017, she released her debut album, Journal intime, led by her first platinum hit, "Comportement". The record was certified platinum in France. On 23 September 2017, she participated in La Nuit du Mali, a celebration of Malian Independence Day, at Bercy. She shared the stage with Oumou Sangaré and other Malian artists, such as Cheick Tidiane Seck, Lassana Hawa, and Mokobé.

=== 2018–2020: Nakamura ===
On 6 April 2018, Nakamura released "Djadja"—the lead single from her second studio album—which spent two consecutive weeks at number one on the French charts and was later certified diamond. Its music video reached one billion YouTube views in February 2025, making Nakamura the first female African artist to achieve the feat.

The song became a hit in France as well as internationally. Nakamura became the first French female artist to reach number one in the Netherlands since Édith Piaf with "Non, je ne regrette rien", in 1961.

"Djadja" was also the first Francophone song since 2009 to reach the top of the Dutch charts, the last one being "Alors on danse" by Belgian artist Stromae. "Djadja" charted strongly across Europe, reaching the top five in Spain, top 40 in Belgium, Italy, Hungary, and Switzerland, as well as charting in Germany and Sweden.

Nakamura's next single, "Copines", released in August 2018, entered at number four in France, before climbing to number one in November. It went on to be certified Diamond. Also in November, Nakamura released her second album, Nakamura. Following its success, the singer won the European Music Moves Talent Award for Best Urban album in January 2019. In April, she released the video for "Pookie", which became the most-viewed French music video that year. In August, she issued a remix of the song, featuring American rapper Lil Pump. In May 2019, she was portrayed by The New York Times as "one of the most important acts in Europe now, musically and socially".

In June 2019, she earned her first nomination at the BET Awards as Best International Act.

In October, "Djadja" went Platinum in Spain and Portugal, while "Pookie" was certified double Platinum in Italy. In the December year-end recaps, Nakamura was named Most Watched French female artist in 2019 by YouTube and Most Streamed French female artist in 2019 by Spotify. In January 2020, it was announced that she would perform at that year's Coachella Festival.

On 12 June, Nakamura released a Spanish-language version of "Djadja", with Colombian singer Maluma.

=== 2020–2021: Aya ===
On 17 July 2020, Nakamura released the single "Jolie nana", from her third studio album, Aya. It debuted at number one on the French singles chart and achieved Gold status in two weeks.

On 9 October, she issued the second single from the album, "Doudou". It peaked at number 6 in France, in the top 40 in Belgium, and number 16 on the UK Afrobeats chart.

Aya came out on 13 November and included collaborations with Stormzy, Ms Banks, and Oboy.

On 26 March 2021, Major Lazer released a deluxe edition of their album Music Is the Weapon containing the song "C'est cuit", which features Nakamura and Swae Lee. This was followed on 27 May by the non-album single "Bobo", which peaked at number three on the French singles chart. Nakamura was also featured on French rapper Franglish's song "Sans moi", from his album Vibe. It was released as a single in August, and its music video reached one million views in 24 hours. Nakamura's image on the cover of Vogue France was chosen as the favourite magazine cover of 2021.

=== 2022–present: DNK, Destinée ===
In 2022, Nakamura released three non-album singles: "Dégaine" featuring Damso, "Méchante", and "VIP". "Dégaine" debuted atop the French singles charts, while the other two reached the top 40. In October, Nakamura performed a virtual concert in the video game Fortnite, becoming the first French artist to do so. This was followed by the release of "SMS" in December as the lead single from her fourth studio album, DNK. The album was released on 27 January 2023 and topped the French albums chart for two consecutive weeks. It was further promoted by two other singles, "Baby" and "Daddy", featuring SDM. On 17 August, Nakamura surprise-released a deluxe version of DNK, featuring three additional songs.

On 25 January 2024, she issued the single "Hypé". It was followed on 7 March by a remix in collaboration with Ayra Starr. At the second edition of the Flammes Awards in April 2024, she won three awards, the most wins of that year. Following the releases of "Doggy", "Si Si" (with Morad), and "42", as well as her appearance alongside rappers SDM and SCH as a judge on the third season of Nouvelle École (France's equivalent of Rhythm + Flow),.

On 26 July 2024, she performed at the opening ceremony for the 2024 Summer Olympics in Paris. The performance created a viral sensation on social media, with especially her mashup of "Pookie" and Charles Aznavour's "For Me... Formidable" trending both within and outside of France..

In February 2025, she released the single "Chimiyé".

In June 2025, a wax figure of Nakamura was unveiled at the Musée Grévin in Paris.

In October 2025, Nakamura sold out three dates at the Stade de France in May 2026 in just a few minutes, welcoming 240,000 people and setting a record for consecutive nights for a French-speaking female artist.

In November 2025, Nakamura released her fifth studio album, Destinée, which blends Afro-pop, Caribbean rhythms, and Afrobeats across eighteen tracks.

On July 31, 2026, Nakamura was featured on the track "Yaya," from Nigerian singer Davido's sixth studio album, Oriadé. The 13-track album, released to mark 15 years since the start of Davido's professional music career, also featured Black Sherif, Mayorkun, Fola, Leon Thomas, and Llona.

== Artistry ==
Nakamura's music draws on genres such as pop, R&B, zouk, and Afrobeats, with Shamira Ibrahim of Pitchfork calling her "fearlessly genre-bending". She writes her own lyrics, which are in French and make frequent use of argot as well as expressions borrowed from other languages such as English, Arabic, and Bambara. Due to her family's background, she has sometimes been described as continuing the griot tradition, but she argues that her work is different.

== Public image ==
Le Figaro has described Nakamura as a polarising figure in France. Her lyrics in particular have been the subject of much debate in the country. Detractors consider that her use of slang devalues the French language, with some, such as far-right commentator and politician Éric Zemmour, calling her lyrics "a foreign language". On the other hand, linguists tend to defend her work; they view it as part of the broader tradition of French poetry and songwriting that helps keep the language alive. In November 2020, deputy Rémy Rebeyrotte of the centrist party Renaissance cited Nakamura during his argument in favour of a law that would ban discrimination based on accent in France, saying that the way she "reinvents" French expressions is "remarkable". Nakamura herself has expressed frustration over constantly being asked to explain the meaning of her lyrics and believes that this may be related to misogyny, as "there are [male] rappers who invent much worse" in her opinion. She has stated that "there are lots of people who speak like me and young people who understand".

Nakamura is also known for her "boastful" and "unapologetic" persona, which has been compared to that of artists such as Rihanna and Cardi B. This has earned her accusations of being haughty, which she countered with "I see it as confidence". Rokhaya Diallo wrote in The Guardian that her persona "may be why she draws such a hostile reaction in a country that tends to demand humility and gratitude from minorities". Conversely, she has been described as a symbol of empowerment, particularly for black women. Malian singer Oumou Sangaré has praised the way that Nakamura "built a name for herself in a male-dominated world" and considers her an inspiration for young people, while French fashion designer Simon Porte Jacquemus, who has worked with Nakamura, views her as representative of her generation, "whether ... men or women, black or not". Her song "Djadja" has frequently been quoted in demonstrations against sexist violence in France. Although she does not view her work as feminist, she has said that she is "happy if [her] songs speak for themselves".

=== 2024 Paris Olympics ===
A few months before the 2024 Summer Olympics in Paris, there was speculation that Nakamura would perform at the opening ceremony. This led to protests, especially from the far right, including a banner by Les Natifs (a splinter group of Les Identitaires) that read, "There's no way, Aya. This is Paris, not the Bamako market." Politician Marine Le Pen, the former president of the National Rally, also criticised the rumoured decision, deeming it a "provocation" and a "humiliation" on Macron's part. The backlash was described as racist by French politicians and public figures as well as by international media. In response, Nakamura received support from the Paris 2024 committee and others, including French Minister of Sports Amélie Oudéa-Castéra and Minister of Culture Rachida Dati. According to an Odoxa poll, 63% of French people disapproved of Nakamura performing at the Olympics.

On 15 March, an investigation into racist online posts towards Nakamura was opened following complaints filed by the LICRA and SOS Racisme. Nakamura herself responded to the backlash with a social media post stating, "You can be racist but not deaf... That's what hurts you! I'm becoming a number 1 state subject in debates... but what do I really owe you? Nada." This was followed by another post thanking those who had supported her, "especially my community". In April, Macron stated that Nakamura "speaks to a good number of our fellow citizens" and that he thought she was "absolutely in her rightful place in an opening or closing ceremony".

At the opening ceremony on 26 July, Nakamura performed a medley of her songs "Pookie" and "Djadja" with Charles Aznavour's "For me formidable", from his 1963 album Qui ?, accompanied by the French Republican Guard. It became the most-watched moment in French television history, with 31.4 million watchers.

== Personal life ==
Nakamura is Muslim. Since 2019, she has supported the ALIYAH association, created by the parents of a young girl suffering from hemolytic-uremic syndrome.

Nakamura gave birth to her first child, a daughter, in 2016. She has declined to share the father's identity. In 2019, she was in a brief relationship with her "Sucette" collaborator Niska. She has accused him of domestic violence and expressed regret over not pressing charges. In October 2020, she confirmed her relationship with music video producer Vladimir Boudnikoff, with whom she had worked previously. Their daughter was born in January 2022. After an incident in August of the same year, Nakamura announced the couple's separation in October. Both Nakamura and Boudnikoff were charged with reciprocal domestic violence in relation to the events of August 2022. On 23 February 2023, a Bobigny judge ruled that Nakamura had to pay a €10,000 fine, while Boudnikoff had to pay €5,000.

In August 2026, Nakamura became engaged to French rapper Ryad Kartoum, known as RK.

== Discography ==
=== Albums ===
Title	Details	Peak positions							Units	Certification
Title	Details	FRA	BEL (FL)	BEL (WA)	NLD	ITA	SPA	SWI	Units	Certification
Journal intime	Released: 25 August 2017; Label: Rec. 118, Parlophone, Warner Music France; Formats: CD, LP, digital download, streaming	6	143	34	—	—	—	—		SNEP: 2× Platinum
Nakamura	Released: 2 November 2018; Label: Rec. 118, Parlophone, Warner Music France; Formats: CD, LP, digital download, streaming	3	29	8	10	90	92	20	NLD: 20,000	SNEP: Diamond; BEA: Platinum; MC: Gold
Aya	Released: 13 November 2020; Label: Rec. 118, Warner Music France; Formats: CD, LP, digital download, streaming	2	14	2	36	—	71	8		SNEP: 3× Platinum
DNK	Released: 27 January 2023; Label: Rec. 118, Warner Music France; Formats: CD, LP, digital download, streaming	1	65	2	—	—	—	6		SNEP: 2× Platinum
Destinée	Released: 21 November 2025; Label: Nakamura Industrie, Warner Music France; Formats: CD, LP, digital download, streaming	1	—	9	—	—	—	16	FRA: 120,000 (Note: France sales figures for Destinée as of June 2026.)	SNEP: Platinum
"—" denotes a recording that did not chart or was not released in that territory.

=== Singles ===
==== As lead artist ====
List of singles, with selected chart positions and certifications
Title	Year	Peak positions										Certifications	Album
Title	Year	FRA	BEL (FL)	BEL (WA)	GER	ITA	LUX	NLD	POR	SPA	SWI	Certifications	Album
"Super héros" (featuring Gradur)	2016	34	—	—	—	—	—	—	—	—	—	SNEP: Gold	Journal intime
"Comportement"	2017	13	—	40	—	—	—	—	—	—	—	SNEP: Platinum	Journal intime
"Oumou Sangaré"	2018	65	—	—	—	—	—	—	—	—	—		Journal intime
"Djadja" (solo, featuring Loredana or Maluma)	2018	1	16	16	43	23	—	1	37	5	29	SNEP: Diamond; BEA: 3× Platinum; BPI: Silver; BVMI: Gold; FIMI: Platinum; IFPI SWI: Gold; MC: 2× Platinum; NVPI: 2× Platinum; PROMUSICAE: 4× Platinum	Nakamura
"Copines"	2018	1	— (Note: "Copines" did not enter the Ultratop 50 Flanders, but peaked at number 24 on the Ultratip Bubbling Under.)	7	—	—	—	46	181	—	60	SNEP: Diamond; BEA: Gold; FIMI: Gold; MC: Platinum; PROMUSICAE: Gold	Nakamura
"Pookie" (solo, featuring Lil Pump or Capo Plaza)	2019	5	18	9	—	2	—	—	—	—	55	SNEP: Diamond; BEA: 3× Platinum; FIMI: 2× Platinum; MC: Platinum	Nakamura
"Soldat"	2019	6	—	— (Note: "Soldat" did not enter the Ultratop 50 Wallonia but peaked at number 15 on the Ultratip Bubbling Under.)	—	—	—	—	—	—	—	SNEP: Gold	Nakamura
"Jolie nana"	2020	1	8	2	— (Note: "Jolie nana" did not enter the German Singles Chart but peaked at number 6 on the German Single Trending Charts.)	—	—	18	—	—	4	SNEP: Diamond; BEA: 2× Platinum	Aya
"Doudou"	2020	6	— (Note: "Doudou" did not enter the Ultratop 50 Flanders but peaked at number 20 on the Ultratip Bubbling Under.)	40	—	—	—	—	—	—	—	SNEP: Platinum	Aya
"Bobo"	2021	3	—	23	—	—	—	67	—	—	16	SNEP: Platinum	Non-album singles
"Dégaine" (featuring Damso)	2022	1	—	15	—	—	17	— (Note: "Dégaine" did not enter the Dutch Single Top 100 but peaked at number 19 on the Single Tip chart.)	—	—	19	SNEP: Diamond	Non-album singles
"Méchante"	2022	27	—	—	—	—	—	— (Note: "Méchante" did not enter the Dutch Single Top 100 but peaked at number 14 on the Single Tip chart.)	—	—	—		Non-album singles
"VIP"	2022	39	—	—	—	—	—	—	—	—	—	SNEP: Gold	Non-album singles
"SMS"	2022	16	—	—	—	—	—	—	—	—	—	SNEP: Gold	DNK
"Baby"	2023	2	—	8	—	—	15	— (Note: "Baby" did not enter the Dutch Single Top 100 but peaked at number 14 on the Single Tip chart.)	—	—	22	SNEP: Diamond	DNK
"DJO"	2023	18	—	—	—	—	—	—	—	—	—		Mood 3
"Hypé" (solo or featuring Ayra Starr)	2024	2	—	—	—	—	—	—	—	—	50	SNEP: Diamond	Non-album singles
"Doggy"	2024	19	—	—	—	—	—	—	—	—	—		Non-album singles
"Avec classe" (with Corneille and Trinix)	2024	20	—	31	—	—	—	—	—	—	—	SNEP: Diamond	Non-album singles
"42"	2024	26	—	—	—	—	—	—	—	—	—	SNEP: Platinum	Non-album singles
"Baddies" (with Joé Dwèt Filé)	2025	7	—	42	—	—	—	—	—	—	—	SNEP: Diamond	Destinée
"Désarmer"	2025	—	—	—	—	—	—	—	—	—	—		Destinée
"No Stress"	2025	13	—	16	—	—	—	—	—	—	—		Destinée
"Sexy Nana" (with La Rvfleuze)	2026	1	—	17	—	—	3	—	—	—	10	SNEP: Gold	Destinée Supremacy
"—" denotes a recording that did not chart or was not released in that territory.

==== As featured artist ====
List of singles as featured artists, with selected chart positions and certifications
Title	Year	Peak positions		Certifications	Album
Title	Year	FRA	BEL (WA)	Certifications	Album
"Love d'un voyou" (Fababy featuring Aya Nakamura)	2015	9	37* (Ultratip)		
"Sorry" (Abou Debeing featuring Aya Nakamura)	2016	188	—		
"Bad Boy" (Fally Ipupa featuring Aya Nakamura)	2017	68	—	SNEP: Gold	
"Moi je vérifie" (Naza featuring Dadju and Aya Nakamura)	2017	171	—		
"Pourquoi tu forces" (DJ Erise featuring Aya Nakamura)	2018	177	—		
"Comme ci comme ça" (Tour 2 Garde featuring Aya Nakamura)	2018	—	—		
"C'est cuit" (Major Lazer featuring Aya Nakamura and Swae Lee)	2021	72	—		Music Is the Weapon (Reloaded)
"—" denotes a recording that did not chart or was not released in that territory.

*Did not appear in the official Belgian Ultratop 50 charts but rather in the bubbling under Ultratip charts

=== Other charted and certified songs ===
Title	Year	Peak positions				Certification	Album
Title	Year	FRA	BEL (WA)	SWI	SPA	Certification	Album
"Oublier"	2016	96	—	—	—		Journal intime
"Fuego" (featuring Dadju)	2017	85	—	—	—		Journal intime
"J'ai mal (Part 2)"	2017	18	—	—	—	SNEP: Platinum	Journal intime
"Problèmes" (featuring MHD)	2017	118	—	—	—		Journal intime
"Jalousie" (featuring Lartiste)	2017	121	—	—	—		Journal intime
"Karma"	2017	146	—	—	—		Journal intime
"Orphelin" (featuring KeBlack)	2017	151	—	—	—		Journal intime
"La dot"	2018	3	32	71	—	SNEP: Platinum	Nakamura
"Sucette" (featuring Niska)	2018	4	—	—	—	SNEP: Platinum	Nakamura
"Oula"	2018	5	—	—	—	SNEP: Gold	Nakamura
"Pompom"	2018	8	—	—	—	SNEP: Gold	Nakamura
"Ça fait mal"	2018	13	—	—	—		Nakamura
"Whine Up"	2018	15	—	—	—		Nakamura
"Gangster"	2018	18	—	—	—	SNEP: Gold	Nakamura
"Faya"	2018	21	—	—	—		Nakamura
"Gang" (featuring Davido)	2018	35	—	—	—	SNEP: Gold	Nakamura
"Dans ma bulle"	2018	40	—	—	—		Nakamura
"Cadeau" (featuring Naza)	2018	171	—	60	—		
"40%"	2019	4	30	—	—	SNEP: Diamond	Nakamura (Deluxe Edition)
"Claqué"	2019	45	—	—	—		Nakamura (Deluxe Edition)
"Idiot"	2019	65	—	—	—	SNEP: Gold	Nakamura (Deluxe Edition)
"Plus jamais" (featuring Stormzy)	2020	1	36	24	—	SNEP: Gold	Aya
"Tchop"	2020	7	—	62	—		Aya
"Préféré" (featuring Oboy)	2020	4	—	—	—		Aya
"Fly"	2020	8	—	—	—	SNEP: Platinum	Aya
"Sentiments grandissants"	2020	9	—	—	—		Aya
"Love de moi"	2020	13	—	—	—		Aya
"Biff"	2020	14	—	—	—		Aya
"Nirvana"	2020	17	—	—	—		Aya
"Ça blesse"	2020	18	—	—	—	SNEP: Gold	Aya
"Hot"	2020	19	—	—	—	SNEP: Gold	Aya
"La machine"	2020	21	—	—	—		Aya
"Mon chéri"	2020	27	—	—	—		Aya
"Mon lossa" (featuring Ms Banks)	2020	28	—	—	—		Aya
"Ailleurs"	2021	124	—	—	—		20/21
"Cadeau" (featuring Tiakola)	2023	4	47	—	—	SNEP: Platinum	DNK
"Daddy"	2023	6	—	99	—	SNEP: Platinum	DNK
"Chacun" (featuring Kim)	2023	25	—	—	—		DNK
"Corazon"	2023	27	—	—	—		DNK
"Tous les jours"	2023	37	—	—	—	SNEP: Gold	DNK
"T'as peur" (featuring Myke Towers)	2023	38	—	—	29	PROMUSICAE: Gold	DNK
"Beleck"	2023	39	—	—	—		DNK
"Coller"	2023	51	—	—	—		DNK
"Haut niveau"	2023	56	—	—	—		DNK
"Le goût"	2023	59	—	—	—		DNK
"Bloqué"	2023	80	—	—	—		DNK
"Bisous"	2023	62	—	—	—		DNK
"Chérie"	2023	23	—	—	—		DNK
"Anesthesie"	2025	50	—	—	—		Destinée
"Baby Boy" (featuring Kali Uchis)	2025	71	—	—	—		Destinée
"Dis-Moi" (featuring Shenseea)	2025	95	—	—	—		Destinée
"—" denotes a recording that did not chart or was not released in that territory.

== Tours ==
=== Headlining ===
- Nakamura Tour (2019)
- DNK Tour (2023–2024)
- Destinée Tour (2026)

== Awards and nominations ==
Year	Award	Category	Work	Result
2018	W9 D'OR	Most Lstened Female Artist	Herself	Won
2019	Music Moves Europe Talent Awards	Public Choice Awards (France)	Herself	Won
2019	MTV Europe Music Awards	Best French Act	Herself	Nominated
2019	BET Awards	Best International Act	Herself	Nominated
2019	All Africa Music Awards	Best Francophone	Herself	Nominated
2019	All Africa Music Awards	Artist of the Year	Herself	Nominated
2019	All Africa Music Awards	Crossing Boundaries with Music Award	Herself	Nominated
2019	All Africa Music Awards	Best Female West Africa	Herself	Nominated
2019	All Africa Music Awards	Best Collaboration	"Sucette" (feat. Niska)	Nominated
2019	All Africa Music Awards	Song of the Year	"Pookie"	Nominated
2019	NRJ Music Awards	Francophone Song of the Year	"Pookie"	Nominated
2019	NRJ Music Awards	Francophone Performance of the Night	"Pookie"	Nominated
2019	NRJ Music Awards	Francophone Female Artist	Herself	Nominated
2020	MTV Europe Music Awards	Best French Act	Herself	Nominated
2020	NRJ Music Awards	Francophone Female Artist of the Year	Herself	Won
2021	Apple Music Awards	Artist of the Year (France)	Herself	Won
2023	The Future Awards Africa	Prize for Music	Herself	Pending
