= RK (rapper) =

- RK in 2023

Background information
- Born: Ryad Kartoum; 7 November 2001 (age 24); Meaux, France
- Genres: French hip-hop
- Instrument: Vocals
- Years active: 2018–present
- Partner: Aya Nakamura

Ryad Kartoum (born 7 November 2001), known as RK, is a French rapper. His debut album Insolent (2018) went to number one on the French Albums Chart and was certified platinum by SNEP. He has released seven albums that made the top 10 of the French Albums Chart, three of which certified gold and two platinum. He has released four singles certified diamond, and six certified platinum. His highest position on the French Singles Chart is 3, for "C'est mon sang" featuring Sofiane (2019) and "Viano" featuring Genezio (2025).

== Early life ==
Ryad Kartoum was born on 7 November 2001 in Meaux in the department of Seine-et-Marne, and raised in the Beauval neighbourhood of the same city. He is of Algerian descent. He initially rapped as a hobby while wanting to be a professional footballer, but suffered an injury and started smoking, then gave up the sport.

== Musical career ==
At age 16, RK was signed to a four-album contract by 357 Music, founded by a childhood friend who became his manager and producer. On 21 September 2018, he released his debut album Insolent, which went to number one on the French Albums Chart, with first-week figures of 21,000 album-equivalent units. A month later, it received a gold disc from SNEP for 50,000 units. On 8 February 2019, it received a platinum disc for 100,000 units. In May 2025, the song "Bae" from the album was certified diamond.

RK's second album Rêves de gosse, released 5 April 2019, went to number 3 in France, and was certified gold in June and platinum in 2021. In October 2019, a month before turning 18, he had sales of 200,000 albums. The single "C'est mon sang", with Sofiane, was certified diamond in 2025.

In July 2020, RK's third album Neverland was released, with features from Maes, SCH and Leto. The album entered at a peak of number 2, and was certified gold seven months later. His fourth album, 100 rancunes, was announced shortly before his arrest for domestic violence in June 2021; it entered at a peak of number 3 and fell out of the top 200 in seven weeks.

The album Mentalité was released in two parts and entered the chart at a peak of 7 in October 2022, before being certified gold in June 2023; a year later, DLPDA reached number 3. RK's mixtape Topboy : Tome 1 was released at a peak of number 8 in October 2025, and certified gold in July. Its singles "Viano" (featuring Genezio) and "Sale état" (featuring Ninho) charted at 3 and 5 respectively, and were certified diamond and platinum respectively.

== Personal life ==
RK is a fan of Paris Saint-Germain and the national football teams of France and Algeria. In August 2026, he became engaged to French–Malian singer Aya Nakamura.

=== Legal affairs ===
On 8 November 2021, RK was convicted of domestic violence and given a six-month suspended sentence. In January 2026, he appeared on Canal+ programme Clique and expressed remorse.

In December 2025, RK was named in a legal complaint by his former manager and producer, who alleged that disputes over a contract had led to threatening telephone calls and Kalashnikov rifle shots at his parents' house.
