= Joé Dwèt Filé =

Haitian singer

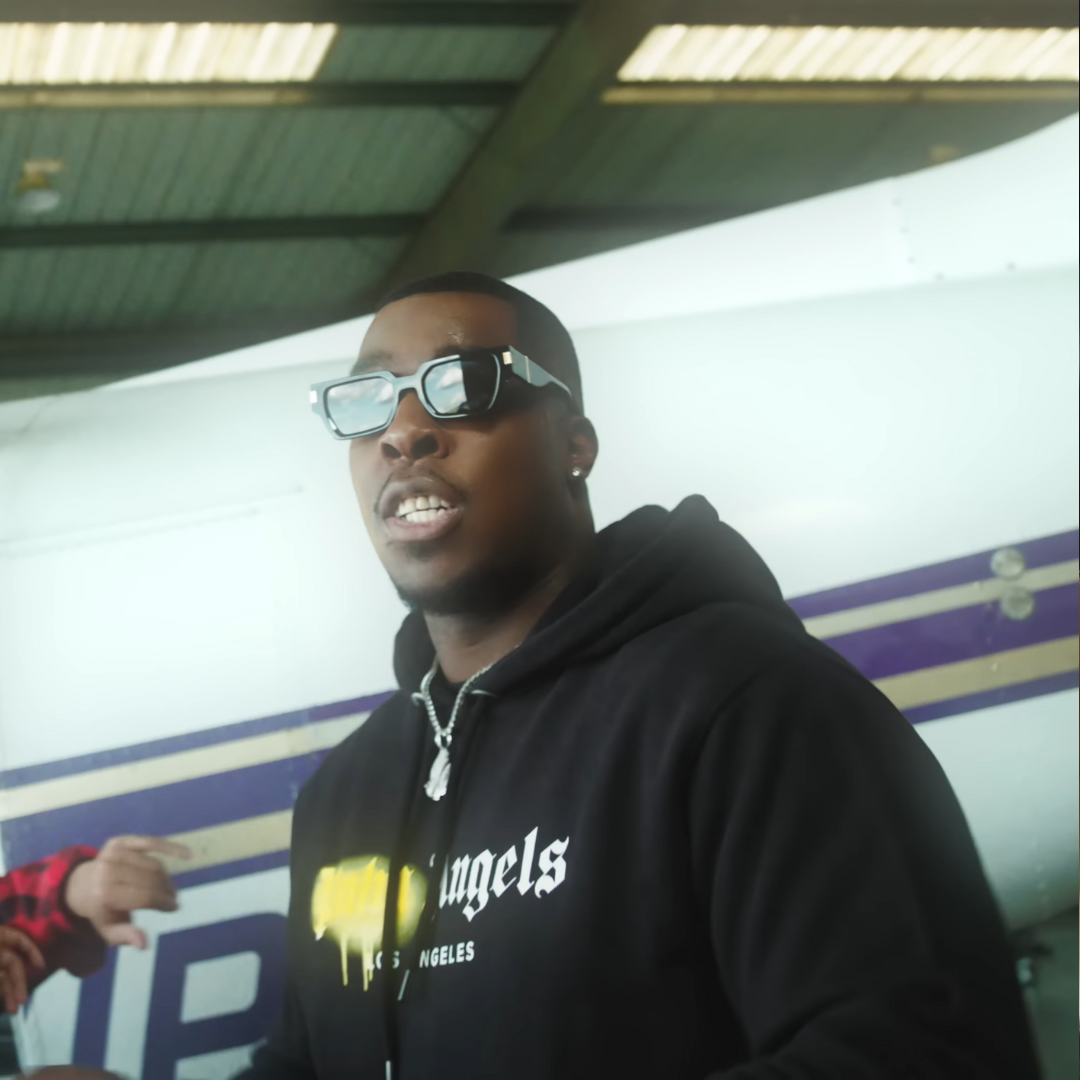

Background information
- Born: 12 March 1995 (age 31); Paris, Île de France, France
- Origin: Haiti
- Genres: R&B; Soul; Urban Konpa
- Occupation: Singer
- Label: Bendo Music DF Empire

Joé Gilles aka Joé Dwèt Filé is a French-Haitian singer. He was involved in music from a very young age through his church. He later moved to sing with Afro-Caribbean influenced songs of mainly zouk and konpa songs. He was also involved in hits like "Que toi" of Stoney and "Un mot" of Axel Tony and "Mama hé" by Vegedream.

He formed his own band Lespada gaining further popularity on YouTube encouraging him to release a mixtape with them followed by ow mixtape #ESOLF (Et Si On Le Faisait) in June 2018 followed by a 15-track studio album À deux on 29 March 2019. He also engaged in a tour that included France, Belgium, Switzerland, USA and at the Olympia in Montreal, Canada. He also appeared at the famous La Cigale in Paris. He released singles "À deux" in 2019 and "Egoïste" featuring Singuila and "Tu me mens" in 2020 with accompanied music videos established him further. On 18 April 2020, he released his EP Eira. His single "Jolie madame" in collaboration featuring Ronisia gave him his biggest charting hit on SNEP, the French Singles Chart. He released 4 Kampé on October 24 2024. The album has been a great success in the Afro Caribbean community.

== Discography ==
=== Albums ===
Title	Year	Peak chart positions	
Title	Year	FRA	BEL (Wa)
À deux	2019	15	38
Calypso	2021	4	37
Daddy 9	2023	—	70
Hatelove	2026	4	45

=== Mixtapes ===
Title	Year	Peak chart positions	
Title	Year	FRA	BEL (Wa)
#Esolf	2018	47	92
Goumin	2024	—	60

=== EP ===
Title	Year	Peak chart positions	
Title	Year	FRA	BEL (Wa)
Eira	2020	39	66

=== Singles ===
==== As lead singer ====
Title	Year	Peak chart positions		Album
Title	Year	FRA	BEL (WA)	Album
"Jolie madame" (feat. Ronisia)	2021	10	—	Non-album release
"C'est toi"	2021	54	—	Non-album release
"4 Kampé"	2024	6	46	Non-album release
"Baddies" (with Aya Nakamura)	2025	7	—	Non-album release

==== Featured in ====
Title	Year	Peak chart positions	Album
Title	Year	FRA	Album
"Instagram" (Vegedream feat. Joé Dwèt Filé)	2019	45	Vegedream album Ategban

=== Other songs ===
Title	Year	Peak chart positions	Album
Title	Year	FRA	Album
"Comme avant"	2019	103	À deux
"Confiance"	2019	176	À deux
"Comment ça"	2019	181	À deux
"Karma"	2019	190	À deux
"Route 66"	2020	179	Eira
"La même chose"	2020	45	Non-album release
"Chérie Coco"	2021	122	Calypso
"Oui"	2021	128	Calypso
"Tu m'attires"	2021	129	Calypso
"Coeurs sombre"	2021	154	Calypso
"Donne tout"	2021	167	Calypso
"A trop t'aimer"	2021	173	Calypso
"Une autre"	2021	179	Calypso
"Baby mama"	2021	183	Calypso
"Priorité"	2021	185	Calypso
"Toujours mal"	2021	189	Calypso
"Mon pote"	2021	194	Calypso
