= Booba discography =

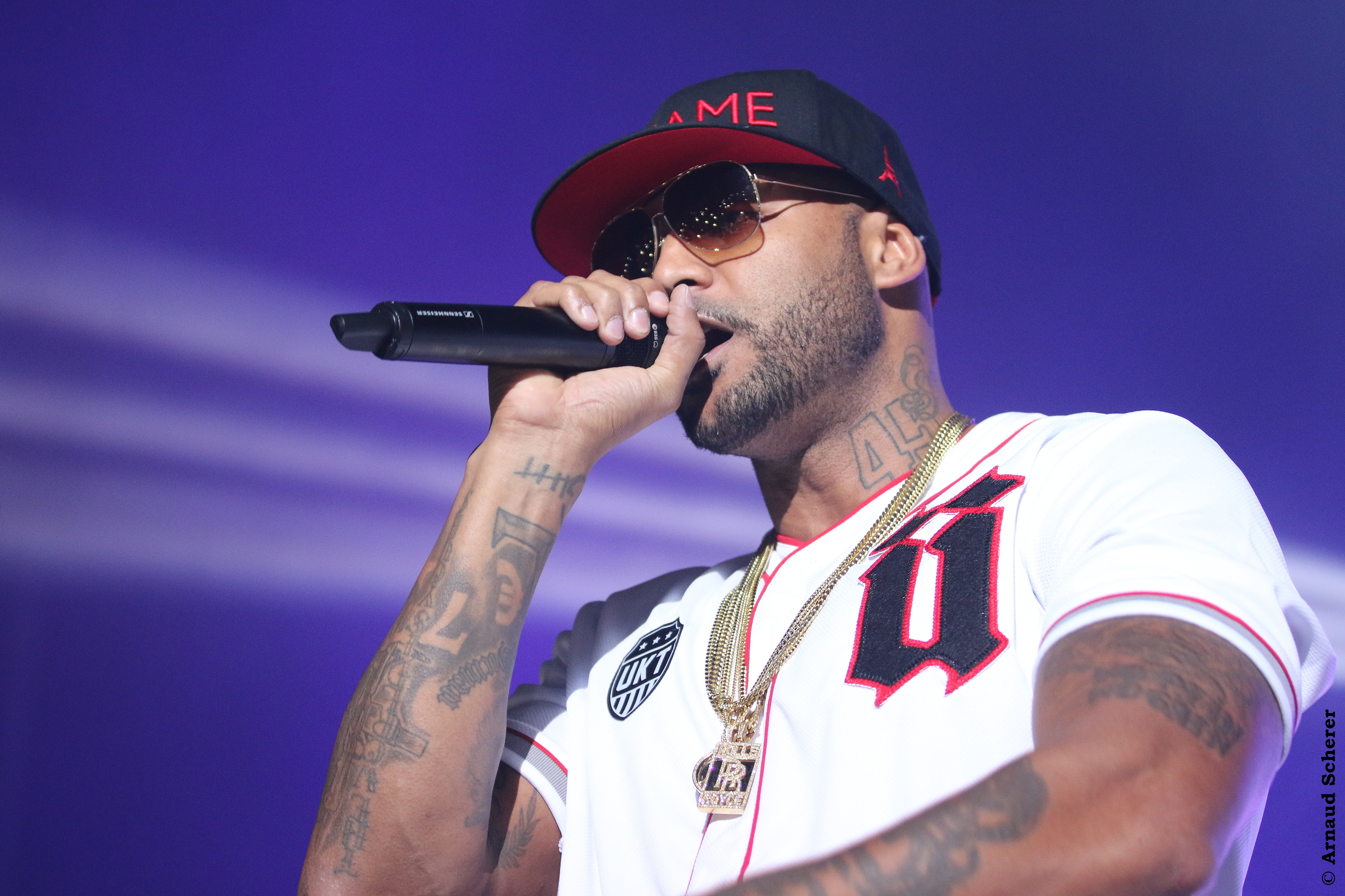
- Studio albums: 12
- Mixtapes: 5

The discography of French rapper and singer Booba consists of twelve studio albums and five mixtapes. Booba (born Élie Thitia Yaffa, in 9 December 1976) is a rapper, singer and founder of record label Tallac Records. He has sold over 10 million album-equivalent units as of 2021.

== Studio albums ==
Year	Album	Peak positions				Certifications
Year	Album	FRA	BEL (FL)	BEL (WA)	SWI	Certifications
2002	Temps mort	2	–	41	–	FRA: Gold
2004	Panthéon	3	–	26	25	FRA: Gold
2006	Ouest Side	1	–	12	18	FRA: Platinum
2008	0.9	6	–	27	60	FRA: Gold
2010	Lunatic	1	–	1	24	FRA: 2× Platinum
2012	Futur	4	74	5	14	FRA: 3× Platinum
2013	Futur 2.0 (reissue)	6	–	–	28	
2015	D.U.C	1	40	1	2	FRA: Platinum
2015	Nero Nemesis	7	127	7	9	FRA: Platinum
2017	Trône	1	39	3	12	FRA: Diamond
2021	Ultra	2	4	2	2	FRA: Platinum
2024	Ad vitam æternam	1	137	1	3	
2026	Blanco nemesis	–	196	6	6	

== Mixtapes ==
Year	Album	Peak positions			Certifications
Year	Album	FRA	BEL (WA)	SWI	Certifications
2005	Autopsie Vol. 1	66	–	–	
2007	Autopsie Vol. 2	8	98	–	
2009	Autopsie Vol. 3	2	19	–	
2011	Autopsie Vol. 4	2	32	64	
2017	Autopsie 0	20	48	–	FRA: Gold

== Singles ==
=== As lead artist ===
Year	Single	Peak positions			Certification	Album
Year	Single	FRA	BEL (WA)	SWI	Certification	Album
2002	"Destinée" (featuring Kayna Samet)	41	–	–		Temps mort
2004	"Avant de partir" (featuring Léya Masry)	24	17 (Ultratip*)	–		Panthéon
2006	"Au bout des rêves" (featuring Trade Union & Mister Rudie)	22	4 (Ultratip*)	–		Ouest Side
2010	"Caesar Palace" (featuring P. Diddy)	–	–	–		
2010	"Ma couleur"	–	24 (Ultratip*)	–		Lunatic
2010	"Jour de paye"	–	–	–		Lunatic
2011	"Paradis"	99	–	–		Lunatic
2011	"Comme une étoile"	–	36 (Ultratip*)	–		Lunatic
2011	"Paname"	48	–	–	FRA: Gold	Autopsie Vol. 4
2011	"Bakel City Gang"	30	43 (Ultratip*)	–		Autopsie Vol. 4
2011	"Vaisseau Mère"	–	–	–		Autopsie Vol. 4
2011	"Scarface"	20	33 (Ultratip*)	–	FRA: Gold	Autopsie Vol. 4
2012	"Caramel"	10	42	–		Futur
2012	"Tombé pour elle"	16	44	–		Futur
2013	"A.C. Milan"	7	19	–		Futur 2.0
2013	"T.L.T"	16	44	–		Futur 2.0
2013	"Turfu"	11	34	–		Futur 2.0
2013	"RTC"	13	15 (Ultratip*)	–		Futur 2.0
2013	"Parlons peu"	5	27	–		Futur 2.0
2013	"Longueur d'avance" (featuring Maître Gims)	13	48	–		Futur 2.0
2014	"La mort leur va si bien"	7	–	–		D.U.C
2014	"OKLM"	1	7	72		D.U.C
2015	"Tony Sosa"	14	46	–		D.U.C
2015	"LVMH"	28	35 (Ultratip*)	–		D.U.C
2015	"Mon pays"	37	–	–		D.U.C
2015	"Validée" (featuring Benash)	2	41	–		Nero Nemesis
2015	"Attila"	35	–	–		Nero Nemesis
2015	"Génération Assassin"	40	–	–		Nero Nemesis
2016	"JDC"	10	21 (Ultratip*)	–		Autopsie 0
2016	"Salside"	8	23 (Ultratip*)	–	FRA: Gold	Autopsie 0
2016	"E.L.E.P.H.A.N.T."	1	39	–	FRA: Platinum	Trône
2016	"DKR"	1	42	42	FRA: Diamond	Trône
2017	"Daniel Sam"	27	11 (Ultratip*)	–	FRA: Gold	Non-album single
2017	"Nougat"	2	42	61	FRA: Platinum	Trône
2018	"Gotham"	–	17	48	FRA: Gold	
2018	"BB"	–	17	42	FRA: Gold	
2018	"Kyll" (with Médine)	2	34	62	FRA: Gold	
2019	"PGP"	1	9	22	FRA: Platinum	Non-album singles
2019	"Arc-en-Ciel"	1	16	37	FRA: Diamond	Non-album singles
2019	"Freestyle Pirate"	42	28 (Ultratip*)	–		Non-album singles
2019	"Glaive"	10	13 (Ultratip*)	–	FRA: Gold	Non-album singles
2020	"Cavaliero"	28	29 (Ultratip*)	–		Non-album singles
2020	"Jauné" (featuring Zed)	1	25	26	FRA: Diamond	Non-album singles
2020	"Dolce Vita"	6	47	51	FRA: Platinum	Non-album singles
2020	"5G"	1	16	28		Non-album singles
2021	"Ratpi World"	1	27	34	FRA: Platinum	Non-album singles
2021	"Mona Lisa" (featuring JSX)	1	2	1	FRA: Diamond	Ultra
2021	"Azerty"	11	23	–		Ultra
2021	"Kayna"	4	40	55	FRA: Gold	Non-album singles
2021	"Plaza Athénée"	10	–	–		Non-album singles
2021	"Dragon"	22	–	77		Non-album singles
2021	"Variant"	7	47	65		Non-album singles
2021	"Geronimo"	–	41	35		Non-album singles
2021	"Leo Messi"	–	48	72		Non-album singles
2022	"Koa"	–	47	–		Non-album singles
2023	"Sport Billy"	10	–	–		Non-album singles
2024	"6G"	–	32	44		Ad vitam æternam
2024	"Rebel"	7	45	–		Ad vitam æternam
2024	"Saga"	4	41	–	FRA: Diamond	Ad vitam æternam
2024	"Dolce Camara" (featuring SDM)	2	14	–		Ad vitam æternam
2025	"Ici c'est Paris" (featuring Blessd)	–	–	–	style="text-align:center;"	Non-album singles
2026	"Seychelles"	16	–	92		Non-album singles

*Did not appear in the official Belgian Ultratop 50 charts, but rather in the bubbling under Ultratip charts.

=== As featured artist ===
Year	Single	Peak positions			Certifications	Album
Year	Single	FRA	BEL (WA)	SWI	Certifications	Album
2011	"Corner" (Gato featuring Booba & Philly Poe)	–	–	–		
2011	"Cruella" (Shay featuring Booba)	–	–	–		
2012	"Call of Bitume" (Rim'K featuring Booba)	72	–	–		Rim'K album Chef de famille
2013	"L.E.F" (Kaaris featuring Booba)	122	–	–		
2014	"Même tarif" (Alonzo featuring Booba)	8	39	–		Alonzo album Règlement de comptes
2015	"A.T.R" (Twinsmatic featuring Booba)	145	–	–		Twinsmatic album Nowhere
2016	"Here" (Christine and the Queens featuring Booba)	52	–	–		
2016	"Rouge et bleu" (Kalash featuring Booba)	15	33 (Ultratip)	–	FRA: Platinum	Kalash album Kaos
2016	"N.W.A." (Kalash featuring Booba)	49	–	–		Kalash album Kaos
2016	"M.L.C" (Niska featuring Booba)	46	–	–		Niska album Zifukoro
2016	"Infréquentables" (Dosseh featuring Booba)	19	13 (Ultratip*)	–	FRA: Diamond	
2016	"Kiname" (Fally Ipupa featuring Booba)	10	38	–	FRA: Gold	
2017	"Mula" (Siboy featuring Booba)	9	32 (Ultratip*)	–		
2017	"Ghetto" (Benash featuring Booba)	10	16 (Ultratip*)	–	FRA: Diamond	
2017	"Oh bah oui" (Lacrim featuring Booba)	2	–	48	FRA: Platinum	Lacrim album Force & Honneur
2017	"Tuba Life" (Niska featuring Booba)	2	9 (Ultratip*)	29	FRA: Diamond	Niska album Commando
2018	"MQTB" (Dosseh featuring Booba)	1	25 (Ultratip*)	–		
2018	"Madrina" (Maes featuring Booba)	24	31	–	FRA: Diamond	Maes album Pure
2018	"Sale mood" (Bramsito featuring Booba)	1	48	–	FRA: Platinum	
2019	"Médicament" (Niska featuring Booba)	1	26	43	FRA: Platinum	Niska album Mr Sal
2019	"Haï" (Gato featuring Booba)	21	–	–		
2020	"Blanche" (Maes featuring Booba)	2	49	10	FRA: Diamond	Maes album Les derniers salopards
2020	"La zone" (SDM featuring Booba)	28	–	–		
2020	"Charbon" (Leto featuring Booba)	27	–	–		Leto album 100 visages
2020	"Tout gâcher" (Green Montana featuring Booba)	25	9 (Ultratip*)	80		Green Montana album Alaska
2020	"Pompeii" (JSX featuring Booba)	8	23 (Ultratip*)	–	FRA: Gold	
2021	"Daddy" (SDM featuring Booba)	14	–	–		SDM album Ocho
2021	"32" (Dala featuring Booba)	65	–	–		
2021	"Kayna" (Kayna Samet featuring Booba)	106	–	–		
2021	"GTA" (JSX featuring Booba)	20	–	–		

*Did not appear in the official Belgian Ultratop 50 charts, but rather in the bubbling under Ultratip charts.

== Other charted songs ==
Year	Title	Peak positions			Certifications	Album
Year	Title	FRA	BEL (WA)	SWI	Certifications	Album
2012	"Jimmy"	108	–	–		Futur
2012	"Kalash" (featuring Kaaris)	116	–	–		Futur
2012	"Wesh Morray"	121	–	–		Futur
2012	"Rolex" (featuring Gato)	131	–	–		Futur
2012	"Tout c'que j'ai"	150	–	–		Futur
2012	"C'est la vie" (featuring 2 Chainz)	153	–	–		Futur
2012	"1.8.7" (featuring Rick Ross)	158	–	–		Futur
2012	"2Pac"	191	–	–		Futur
2013	"2.0"	41	–	–		Future 2.0
2013	"Une vie"	44	–	–		Future 2.0
2013	"Billets verts"	87	–	–		Future 2.0
2015	"Temps mort 2.0" (featuring Lino)	58	–	–		D.U.C
2015	"G-Love" (featuring Farruko)	69	–	–		D.U.C
2015	"3 G"	70	–	–		D.U.C
2015	"Caracas"	116	–	–		D.U.C
2015	"D.U.C"	84	–	–		D.U.C
2015	"Bellucci" (featuring Future)	86	–	–		D.U.C
2015	"Loin d'ici"	112	–	–		D.U.C
2015	"Les meilleurs" (featuring 40 000 Gang)	151	–	–		D.U.C
2015	"Billets violets"	161	–	–		D.U.C
2015	"All Set" (featuring Jeremih)	163	–	–		D.U.C
2015	"Jack Da"	165	–	–		D.U.C
2015	"Mr. Kopp"	146	–	–		D.U.C
2015	"Comme les autres"	169	–	–		Nero Nemesis
2015	"Habibi"	119	–	–		Nero Nemesis
2015	"4G"	109	–	–		Nero Nemesis
2015	"Walabok"	124	–	–		Nero Nemesis
2015	"Talion"	137	–	–		Nero Nemesis
2015	"92I Veyron"	57	16 (Ultratip*)	–	FRA: Diamond	Nero Nemesis
2015	"Charbon"	168	–	–		Nero Nemesis
2015	"Pinocchio" (featuring Damso and Gato)	115	–	–		Nero Nemesis
2015	"Zer'" (featuring Siboy and Benash)	120	–	–		Nero Nemesis
2017	"Petite fille"	28	–	32	FRA: Diamond	Trône
2017	"Trône"	32	–	34	FRA: Platinum	Trône
2017	"113" (featuring Damso)	–	–	38	FRA: Platinum	Trône
2017	"Ridin'"	40	–	–	FRA: Platinum	Trône
2017	"Ça va aller" (featuring Niska and Sidiki Diabaté)	40	–	–	FRA: Gold	Trône
2017	"Friday"	43	30	74	FRA: Diamond	Trône
2017	"Drapeau noir"	48	–	91	FRA: Platinum	Trône
2017	"À la folie"	55	–	–	FRA: Gold	Trône
2017	"Terrain"	74	–	–	FRA: Gold	Trône
2017	"Centurion"	85	–	–	FRA: Gold	Trône
2017	"Bouyon" (featuring Gato)	98	–	–	FRA: Gold	Trône
2017	"Magnifique"	130	–	–	FRA: Gold	Trône
2021	"GP"	2	–	–	FRA: Gold	Ultra
2021	"VVV"	3	–	26	FRA: Gold	Ultra
2021	"Ultra"	4	–	27	FRA: Gold	Ultra
2021	"RST"	5	–	–	FRA: Gold	Ultra
2021	"Bonne journée" (featuring SDM)	6	–	–		Ultra
2021	"Vue sur la mer" (featuring Dala)	8	–	–		Ultra
2021	"Je sais"	9	–	–		Ultra
2021	"Dernière fois" (featuring Bramsito)	10	–	–	FRA: Gold	Ultra
2021	"L'olivier"	12	–	–		Ultra
2021	"Grain de sable" (featuring Elia)	13	–	–		Ultra
2021	"31" (featuring Gato)	14	–	–		Ultra
2024	"Abidal"	18	–	–		Ad vitam æternam
2024	"Bénigni"	21	–	–		Ad vitam æternam
2024	"Signé"	27	–	–		Ad vitam æternam
2024	"GM"	36	–	–		Ad vitam æternam
2024	"CVBSP"	41	–	–		Ad vitam æternam

*Did not appear in the official Belgian Ultratop 50 charts, but rather in the bubbling under Ultratip charts.
