= List of number-one albums of 2024 (Belgium) =

The Belgian Albums Chart, divided into the two main regions Flanders and Wallonia, ranks the best-performing albums in Belgium, as compiled by Ultratop.

== Flanders ==
List of number-one albums of 2024 in Flanders
| Issue date | Album | Artist | Reference |
|---|---|---|---|
| 6 January | Per ongeluk | Pommelien Thijs | |
| 13 January | Joris | Metejoor | |
| 20 January | Noodzakelijk verdriet | Froukje | |
| 27 January | Het langste jaar | Het Zesde Metaal | |
| 3 February | Per ongeluk | Pommelien Thijs | |
| 10 February | Per ongeluk | Pommelien Thijs | |
| 17 February | Vultures 1 | Kanye West and Ty Dolla Sign | |
| 24 February | The Best Is Yet to Come | Novastar | |
| 2 March | Per ongeluk | Pommelien Thijs | |
| 9 March | Morgen beter | Cleymans and Van Geel | |
| 16 March | Eternal Sunshine | Ariana Grande | |
| 23 March | Eternal Sunshine | Ariana Grande | |
| 30 March | Per ongeluk | Pommelien Thijs | |
| 6 April | Cowboy Carter | Beyoncé | |
| 13 April | Cowboy Carter | Beyoncé | |
| 20 April | Cowboy Carter | Beyoncé | |
| 27 April | The Tortured Poets Department | Taylor Swift | |
| 4 May | The Tortured Poets Department | Taylor Swift | |
| 11 May | The Tortured Poets Department | Taylor Swift | |
| 18 May | Joris | Metejoor | |
| 25 May | Hit Me Hard and Soft | Billie Eilish | |
| 1 June | Hit Me Hard and Soft | Billie Eilish | |
| 8 June | Hit Me Hard and Soft | Billie Eilish | |
| 15 June | Hit Me Hard and Soft | Billie Eilish | |
| 22 June | Hit Me Hard and Soft | Billie Eilish | |
| 29 June | Per ongeluk Live | Pommelien Thijs | |
| 6 July | The Tortured Poets Department | Taylor Swift | |
| 13 July | Hit Me Hard and Soft | Billie Eilish | |
| 20 July | The Death of Slim Shady (Coup de Grâce) | Eminem | |
| 27 July | Ate | Stray Kids | |
| 3 August | Hit Me Hard and Soft | Billie Eilish | |
| 10 August | Hit Me Hard and Soft | Billie Eilish | |
| 17 August | Hit Me Hard and Soft | Billie Eilish | |
| 24 August | Hit Me Hard and Soft | Billie Eilish | |
| 31 August | Short n' Sweet | Sabrina Carpenter | |
| 7 September | Wild God | Nick Cave and the Bad Seeds | |
| 14 September | Luck and Strange | David Gilmour | |
| 21 September | Heimwee | Eefje de Visser | |
| 28 September | Hit Me Hard and Soft | Billie Eilish | |
| 5 October | I'll Call You When I'm Home | Berre | |
| 12 October | Moon Music | Coldplay | |
| 19 October | Moon Music | Coldplay | |
| 26 October | Vadertaal | Stan Van Samang | |
| 2 November | Dagdromer | Maksim | |
| 9 November | Songs of a Lost World | The Cure | |
| 16 November | Songs of a Lost World | The Cure | |
| 23 November | From Zero | Linkin Park | |
| 30 November | Het lied van de zeemeermin | K3 | |
| 7 December | Hit Me Hard and Soft | Billie Eilish | |
| 14 December | The Tortured Poets Department | Taylor Swift | |
| 21 December | From Zero | Linkin Park | |
| 28 December | From Zero | Linkin Park | |

== Wallonia ==
List of number-one albums of 2024 in Wallonia
| Issue date | Album | Artist | Reference |
|---|---|---|---|
| 6 January | La melo est gangx | Gazo and Tiakola | |
| 13 January | La melo est gangx | Gazo and Tiakola | |
| 20 January | La melo est gangx | Gazo and Tiakola | |
| 27 January | Chambre 140 | PLK | |
| 3 February | Chambre 140 | PLK | |
| 10 February | Chambre 140 | PLK | |
| 17 February | Ad vitam æternam | Booba | |
| 24 February | Pyramide | Werenoi | |
| 2 March | Pyramide | Werenoi | |
| 9 March | 2024: On a 35 ans! | Les Enfoirés | |
| 16 March | Eternal Sunshine | Ariana Grande | |
| 23 March | Je me souviens d'un adieu | Michel Sardou | |
| 30 March | 2024: On a 35 ans! | Les Enfoirés | |
| 6 April | Cowboy Carter | Beyoncé | |
| 13 April | Saudade | Green Montana | |
| 20 April | Cowboy Carter | Beyoncé | |
| 27 April | The Tortured Poets Department | Taylor Swift | |
| 4 May | The Tortured Poets Department | Taylor Swift | |
| 11 May | Radical Optimism | Dua Lipa | |
| 18 May | Radical Optimism | Dua Lipa | |
| 25 May | Hit Me Hard and Soft | Billie Eilish | |
| 1 June | Hit Me Hard and Soft | Billie Eilish | |
| 8 June | Jvlivs Prequel: Giulio | SCH | |
| 15 June | Chaque seconde | Pierre Garnier | |
| 22 June | Chaque seconde | Pierre Garnier | |
| 29 June | Chaque seconde | Pierre Garnier | |
| 6 July | Loom | Imagine Dragons | |
| 13 July | Chaque seconde | Pierre Garnier | |
| 20 July | The Death of Slim Shady (Coup de Grâce) | Eminem | |
| 27 July | Ate | Stray Kids | |
| 3 August | La vie continue | Maes | |
| 10 August | Hit Me Hard and Soft | Billie Eilish | |
| 17 August | Hit Me Hard and Soft | Billie Eilish | |
| 24 August | Hit Me Hard and Soft | Billie Eilish | |
| 31 August | Short n' Sweet | Sabrina Carpenter | |
| 7 September | Wild God | Nick Cave and the Bad Seeds | |
| 14 September | Babel Babel | Indochine | |
| 21 September | Babel Babel | Indochine | |
| 28 September | Babel Babel | Indochine | |
| 5 October | Nevermore | Mylène Farmer | |
| 12 October | Moon Music | Coldplay | |
| 19 October | À la vie à la mort | SDM | |
| 26 October | À la vie à la mort | SDM | |
| 2 November | GOAT | Ninho and Niska | |
| 9 November | Songs of a Lost World | The Cure | |
| 16 November | Imposteur | Julien Doré | |
| 23 November | From Zero | Linkin Park | |
| 30 November | J'ai menti | Damso | |
| 7 December | Apocalypse | Gazo | |
| 14 December | Jvlivs III: Ad finem | SCH | |
| 21 December | From Zero | Linkin Park | |
| 28 December | Imposteur | Julien Doré | |

== See also ==
- List of Ultratop 50 number-one singles of 2024
