= Blanco Nemesis =

Studio album by Booba
- Released: 29 May 2026
- Genres: Hip hop; French hip hop
- Length: 33:48
- Labels: Tallac; Capitol; Universal
- Producers: Baille Broliker; FIVE; Zee Beatmaker; Sany San; Jo; Snow; Akill; H8MKRZ; Jasmin Beats; OG Blaze

Booba chronology
Ad vitam æternam (2024)	Blanco Nemesis (2026)

Singles from Blanco Nemesis
- 1. "Seychelles" Released: 6 February 2026

Blanco Nemesis is the twelfth studio album by French rapper Booba. It was released on 29 May 2026 through Tallac Records, Capitol Music France and Universal Music France.

== Background ==
Following the release of his album Nero Nemesis in December 2015, rumours about an album titled Blanco Nemesis began circulating in 2019. In early 2026, Booba confirmed that the album was scheduled for release during the first half of the year. Its release date was announced in May.

On the day of the album's release, Booba announced that the project would receive a second part.

== Track listing ==
Part 1
No.	Title	Producer(s)	Length
1.	"Nemesis"	Baille Broliker	2:13
2.	"Kendall"	FIVE and Zee Beatmaker	3:13
3.	"Seychelles"	Zee Beatmaker	2:38
4.	"V" (featuring Huntrill)	Baille Broliker	3:14
5.	"Tout ira bien"	Zee Beatmaker	3:06
6.	"BZK" (featuring Matra)	Sany San, Jo and Snow	2:53
7.	"CB" (featuring Chaax)	Akill and Baille Broliker	3:37
8.	"Valentine"	Baille Broliker	3:11
9.	"Filtré" (featuring Aïshé)	H8MKRZ	2:58
10.	"Les zhommes"	Zee Beatmaker and Baille Broliker	3:16
11.	"Tempête"	Jasmin Beats, OG Blaze and Zee Beatmaker	3:29
Total length:			33:48

== Music videos ==
- "Seychelles" – 8 February 2026
- "Nemesis" – 29 May 2026
- "Kendall" – 5 June 2026
- "Les zhommes" – 17 July 2026

== Commercial performance ==
Three days after its release, Blanco Nemesis had sold 3,376 units. It sold 7,786 units during its first week, all from streaming, as the album did not receive a physical release.

== Charts ==
Chart performance for Blanco Nemesis
Chart (2026)	Peak position
French Albums (SNEP)	3
