= Lunatic (group) =

French hip hop duo

- Origin: Hauts-de-Seine, France
- Genres: French hip hop
- Years active: 1994–2003
- Labels: Time Bomb; 45 Scientific
- Past members: Ali; Booba

Lunatic was a French hip hop duo from Boulogne-Billancourt. The lineup consisted of Booba (from Boulogne-Billancourt) and Ali (from Issy-les-Moulineaux), coming from the department of Hauts-de-Seine in the west suburb of Paris. Their project Mauvais oeil is considered among the best French rap albums of all time.

After Lunatic split up in 2003, both members went on to solo careers. Their release "Le Crime Paie" was produced by DJ Mars.

== Ali ==
Ali, originally Daddy Ali (born in 1975 at Issy-les-Moulineaux), is a French rapper of Moroccan origin who started his music career with Booba as rap duo Lunatic and now is a solo rapper artist.

After split-up, Ali released his album Chaos et Harmonie in 2005 collaborating with 45 Scientific.

== Booba ==
Elie Yaffa, better known under his stage name Booba (French pronunciation: [buˈba]), is a French rapper. He became hugely successful being the most legally downloaded artist in France.

== Discography: Lunatic ==
=== Albums ===
Year	Album	Peak positions	Certification
Year	Album	FR	Certification
1996	Sortis de l'ombre	–	
2000	Mauvais oeil	10	Gold
2006	Black Album	79	

=== Singles ===
- 1996: "Le crime paie"
- 1997: "Les vrais savent"

=== Appearances ===
- 1996: Time Bomb – Time Bomb explose
- 1996: Time Bomb – Le guidon
- 1996: Lunatic – Le crime paie
- 1996: La Brigade Feat Lunatic – 16 rimes
- 1997: Lunatic – Les vrais savent
- 1997: Lunatic – Le jour J
- 1997: Lunatic – Chateau rouge
- 1997: Lunatic – Viens danser avec les Lunatic
- 1997: Oxmo Puccino Feat Booba – Pucc fiction
- 1997: Lunatic – Bouge comme un diablotin
- 1998: Lunatic Feat Ärsenik – Sang d'encre
- 1999: Lunatic Feat Comité De Brailleurs – On s'maintient
- 1999: Lunatic Feat Malekal Morte – Test ton mic
- 2000: Lunatic Feat Dicidens – De larmes et de sang
- 2000: Lunatic Feat Mala – Hommes de l'ombre
- 2002: Black Jack Feat Lunatic & Mala – Diaspora d'Afrique
- 2002: Lunatic – Que le message passe '
- 2003: Booba Feat Nessbeal – Tout c'qu'on connait

== Discography: Ali ==
- 2005: Chaos et Harmonie
- 2010: Le Rassemblement
- 2015: Que la paix soit sur vous

== Discography: Booba ==
- 2002: Temps mort
- 2004: Panthéon
- 2006: Ouest Side
- 2008: 0.9
- 2010: Lunatic
- 2012: Futur
- 2013: Futur 2.0
- 2015: D.U.C
- 2015: Nero Nemesis
- 2017: Trône
- 2021: Ultra
