= Ouest Side =

Studio album by Booba
- Released: 13 February 2006
- Genre: French hip hop, Gangsta rap
- Length: 58:14
- Label: Tallac Records, Barclay Records, Universal Music Group
- Producer: Yvan Jaquemet; Animalsons; Jaynaz; Phrequincy; Greg Dubuis; Kore; D. Bennett; N. Staff; W. Morris; DJ Mehdi; Gallegos

Booba chronology
Autopsie volume 1 (2005)	Ouest Side (2006)	Autopsie volume 2 (2007)

Singles from Ouest Side
- 1. "Garde la pêche" Released: 5 December 2005; 2. "Boulbi" Released: 2006; 3. "Au bout des rêves" Released: 24 July 2006; 4. "Pitbull" Released: 2006

Professional ratings
Review scores
Source	Rating
Rap2k	16/20 stars

Ouest Side (French for "West side") is the third album by French rapper Booba released on 13 February 2006 on Tallac Records, via the major Barclay Records / Universal Music Group.

== History ==
The cover realized by Armen is inspired by a famous photograph of Malcolm X where he held a weapon while looking out a window. The name Ouest Side is a reference to the fact that Booba comes from the western suburbs of Paris, and equally for his roots in Senegal, found in the west of Africa.

== Track listing ==
#	Title	Producer(s)	Featured guest(s)	Time
1	"Mauvais garçon" ("Bad boy")	Yvan Jaquemet		1:27
2	"Garde la pêche" ("Keep the peach")	Animalsons		2:51
3	"Le Duc de Boulogne" ("The Duke of Boulogne")	Il Francese		3:38
4	"Boîte vocale" ("Voice mail")	Animalsons		3:29
5	"Boulbi"	Animalsons		4:03
6	"Ouest Side" ("West side")	Animalsons		3:40
7	"92Izi"	Phrequincy	Malekal Morte	5:02
8	"Ouais ouais" ("Yeah yeah")	Phrequincy	Mac Tyer	4:34
9	"Pitbull"	Animalsons, Renaud		3:49
10	"Je me souviens" ("I remember")	Greg Dubuis	Kennedy	3:30
11	"Le météore" ("The meteor")	Kore		3:44
12	"Au bout des rêves" ("At the end of the dreams")	D. Bennett, N. Staff, W. Morris	Trade Union, Mister Rudy	3:34
13	"Gun in Hand"	Animalsons	Akon	4:24
14	"Au fond de la classe" ("At the back of the class")	Phrequincy	Intouchable	3:55
15	"Couleur ébène" ("Ebony color")	DJ Mehdi		3:40
16	"Outro"	Gallegos		2:54

Samples

- "Pitbull" contains a sample of "Mistral gagnant" by Renaud.
- "Au bout des rêves" contains a sample of "Drop Leaf" Riddim.
- Outro" contains a sample of "Babaji" by Supertramp, "Intro" by Lunatic & "Tallac" by Booba.

== Charts ==
Chart	Peak position
Belgian (Wallonia) Albums Chart	12
French Albums Chart	1
Swiss Albums Chart	18

== Certifications ==
Region	Certification	Certified units/sales
France (SNEP)	Platinum	200,000^{*}
^{*} Sales figures based on certification alone.
