= Ipséité =

Song by Damso

Single by Damso

from the album Lithopédion
- Released: 27 April 2018
- Genre: French hip hop
- Length: 3:29
- Label: Capitol, Universal
- Songwriter: Damso
- Producers: Heinzberg, Chapo

Damso singles chronology
"Mucho dinero" (2018)	"Ipséité" (2018)	"Smog" (2018)

"Ipséité" (French pronunciation: [ipse.ite]) is a song by Belgian rapper Damso released in 2018.

== Charts ==
Chart performance for "Ipséité"
Chart	Peak position
Belgium (Ultratop 50 Wallonia)	2
France (SNEP)	1
Switzerland (Schweizer Hitparade)	26
