= Ali (French rapper) =

French rapper (born 1975)

- Also known as: Daddy Ali (previously, now dropped); Africain Lié à l'Islam
- Born: Yassine Sekkoumi; 5 May 1975 (age 51); 14th arrondissement of Paris, France
- Genre: French hip hop
- Years active: 1994–present
- Label: 45 Scientific
- Formerly of: Lunatic

Yassine Sekkoumi (Arabic: ياسين سيقوم, romanized: Yāsin Sayaqum), known by his stage name Ali, originally Daddy Ali (born 5 May 1975) is a French rapper of Moroccan origin.

== Career ==
He started his music career with Booba as rap duo Lunatic and is now a solo rapper artist. For a certain time, he also used the stage name Africain Lié à l'Islam before deciding on using his mononym Ali.

After the split-up of Lunatic, Ali released his album Chaos et Harmonie in 2005, collaborating with 45 Scientific. In 2015, he released the album Que la paix soit sur vous.

== Discography ==
=== Albums ===
as part of Lunatic

- 2000: Mauvais œil
- 2006: Black Album

Solo

Year	Album	Peak positions		Certification
Year	Album	FR	BEL (Wa)	Certification
2005	Chaos et Harmonie	14	–	
2010	Le Rassemblement	95	–	
2015	Que la paix soit sur vous	60	146	

=== Appearances ===
as Lunatic

- 1996: Le Crime Paie (Hostile Hip Hop)
- 1996: Time Bomb Explose (X-Men – "J'attaque du Mic")
- 1996: 16 rimes (La Brigade featuring Lunatic)
- 1997: Les Vrais Savent (L 432)
- 1998: Sang d'encre (Sang d'encre)

as Ali

- 1999: Ali in "Nique la halla" – in mixtape Opération coup de poing
- 1999: Ali feat Oxmo Puccino – Esprit mafieux
- 2002: Ali feat Suspects – Ennemis publics
- 2002: Booba feat Ali – Strass et paillettes in Booba album Temps mort
- 2003: Hi-Fi feat Ali & Nasme – "Le code de la rue" on Hi-Fi album Rien à perdre rien à prouver
- 2004: Ali feat Keydj – "Lamentations" in compilation album Sang d'encre haut débit
- 2008: Ali – "Dramatique" in Beni Snassen album Spleen & idéal
- 2008: Abd al Malik feat Ali – in "L'unique" on Beni Snassen album Spleen & idéal
- 2008: Ali feat Case Nègre – in "Soufre" in mixta
- 2011: Tha Trickaz feat Ali, Shabazz the Disciple – in "The night the earth cried" on Tha Trickas album Cloud Adventure
- 2013: Shtar Academy feat Ali – "R.A.P rien a prouver" on the music project Shtar Academy
- 2014: R.E.D.K. feat Ali – "Murderer" on R.E.D.K. solo album
- 2020: Karlito feat. Ali – "Au-delà de l'horizon" on Karlito album Vision
- 2021: Sadek feat. Ali – "Guérison" on Sadek album Aimons-nous vivants
- 2022: Ron Brice feat. Ali – "Addition" on Ron Brice album Côte Est
- 2022: Dinos feat. Ali – "Équilibre" on Dinos EP Nautilus
- 2022: Prince Waly feat. Ali – "Rottweiler" on Prince Waly album Moussa
- 2023: Napoleon Da Legend feat. Ali – "Sacrée" on Napoleon Da Legend album Le dernier glacier
- 2023: La Rumeur feat. Ali – "Homme neuf" on La Rumeur album Comment rester propre ?
