= JSX =

JSX may refer to:

- JSX (airline), independent regional airline in the United States
- JSX (rapper), French rapper
- Jakarta Stock Exchange, former stock exchange based in Jakarta, Indonesia, now part of Indonesia Stock Exchange
  - JSX Composite (officially named IDX Composite), an index of all stocks listed on the Indonesia Stock Exchange
- JSX (programming), an XML-like syntax extension of JavaScript
