= Morose (song) =

2021 song by rapper Damso

Single by Damso

from the album QALF Infinity
- Released: 2021
- Genre: French hip hop
- Length: 4:23
- Label: Capitol; Universal
- Songwriter: Damso
- Producer: Damso

Damso singles chronology
"J'avais juste envie d'écrire" (2021)	"Morose" (2021)

"Morose" is a song by Belgian rapper Damso released in 2021 from his album QALF Infinity. It reached number one in Wallonia and France.

== Charts ==
=== Weekly charts ===
Weekly chart performance for "Morose"
Chart (2021)	Peak position
Belgium (Ultratop 50 Wallonia)	1
France (SNEP)	1
Switzerland (Schweizer Hitparade)	9

=== Year-end charts ===
Weekly chart performance for "Morose"
Chart (2021)	Peak position
Belgium (Ultratop Wallonia)	68

== Certifications ==
Certifications for "Morose"
Region	Certification	Certified units/sales
Belgium (BRMA)	Platinum	20,000^{‡}
France (SNEP)	Diamond	333,333^{‡}
^{‡} Sales+streaming figures based on certification alone.
