= Lunatic (Booba album) =

Studio album by Booba
- Released: 22 November 2010
- Recorded: 2010
- Genre: French hip hop, gangsta rap
- Length: 72:24
- Label: Tallac Records, Because Music

Booba chronology
Autopsie Vol. 3 (2009)	Lunatic (2010)	Autopsie Vol. 4 (2011)

Singles from Lunatic
- 1. "Caesar Palace" Released: 15 September 2010; 2. "Ma Couleur" Released: 1 October 2010; 3. "Jour De Paye" Released: 15 October 2010; 4. "Paradis" Released: 2 November 2010

Lunatic is the fifth album by French rapper Booba and released on 22 November 2010 on Tallac Records. It's named after his former hip hop duo Lunatic, with Ali.

== Track listing ==
#	Title	Producer(s)	Feature(s)	Length
1	"Les Derniers Seront Les Premiers" ("The last shall be first")	Haze		2:00
2	"Cæsar Palace"	2093 & 2031 (Therapy)	Diddy	4:10
3	"Jimmy Deux Fois" ("Jimmy two times")	2093 & 2031 (Therapy)		3:23
4	"Ma Couleur" ("My color")	X-plosive		4:09
5	"Abracadabra"	Martians Productions		3:45
6	"Boss Du Rap Game" ("[The] boss of the rap game")	2093 & 2031 (Therapy)		4:46
7	"Killer"	2093 & 2031 (Therapy)		4:58
8	"Lunatic"	Haze/GIBSON KAGNI	Akon	3:34
9	"Jour De Paye" ("Payday")	2093 & 2031 (Therapy)		4:48
10	"Si Tu Savais" ("If you knew")	J-FASE	92i (Bram's (†) & Mala)	4:18
11	"Comme Une Etoile" ("Like a star")	Nick BZ		3:01
12	"Paradis" ("Paradise")	S2keyz		3:53
13	"45 Scientific"	Martians Productions	Dosseh	4:21
14	"Top Niveau" ("Top level")	Sammy Bagdad		3:36
15	"Reel" ("Real")	Martians Productions	T-Pain	3:49
16	"Me-Ca" ("Dope")	Animalsons	Djé	4:35
17	"Saddam Hauts-de-Seine"	2093 & 2031 (Therapy)		4:24
18	"Fast Life"	Ryan Leslie	Ryan Leslie	4:54
19	"Kojak" (iTunes bonus track)	2093 & 2031 (Therapy)		3:40
