= 0.9 (disambiguation) =

0.9 is the fourth studio album by French rapper Booba.

0.9 may also refer to:

- 0.9, a fractional number
- 0.9̅ or 0.999..., a repeating decimal
- HTTP/0.9, the first documented official version of HTTP
