= Autopsie Vol. 3 =

Mixtape by Booba
- Released: 29 June 2009
- Genre: French hip hop, Gangsta rap
- Label: Tallac Records, Because Music
- Compiler: Medi Med

Booba chronology
0.9 (2008)	Autopsie Vol. 3 (2009)	Lunatic (2010)

Autopsie volume 3 (full title Autopsie Vol. 3 by Booba mixed by DJ Medi Med) is the third mixtape by Booba, released in June 2009. Featuring guests include Seth Gueko, DeMarco, Despo Rutti, Dosseh, Naadei and Humphrey. It reached number 2 on the SNEP French albums chart. staying a total of 22 weeks in the French charts. It also charted in Ultratop, the Belgian French Albums Chart.

== Track listing ==
1. Intro
2. Booba: "A3"
3. Booba: "Double poney"
4. Dosseh: "Non Stop"
5. "Bienvenue dans le Texas"
6. Ne me parle pas de rue"
7. Despo Rutti: "Trashhh"
8. Booba: "La vie en rouge"
9. Busy Signal feat. Alborosie: "Murderer"
10. Capleton feat. Booba: "Liberation Time [remix]"
11. Unité Spéciale feat. NGO: "Millionnaire"
12. "Diamond Girl"
13. Booba: "Rats des villes"
14. "Reste en chien"
15. Booba feat. Yuksek: "Salade tomates oignons [remix]"
16. Naadei: "Ride"
17. Humphrey: "Un grand de demain"
18. Booba feat. Djé, Brams & Mala: "On contrôle la zone"
19. Seth Gueko : "Démarrer"
20. Soma: "El Dorado"
21. "Maman dort"
22. Booba: "Foetus"
23. "Double poney [instrumental]"
24. "Rats des villes [instrumental]"
25. "On contrôle la zone [instrumental]"

== Charts ==
Chart (2011)	Peak position
Ultratop Belgian Albums Chart (Wallonia)	19
SNEP French Albums Chart (Wallonia)	2
