= Autopsie Vol. 4 =

Mixtape by Booba
- Released: 15 November 2011
- Genre: French hip hop, Gangsta rap
- Label: Tallac

Booba chronology
Lunatic (2010)	Autopsie Vol. 4 (2011)	Futur (2012)

Autopsie Vol. 4 (pronounced [otɔpsi]) is a mixtape by French rapper Booba, released on 15 November 2011. In the featuring guests, Kaaris, Gato, Niro and Shay.

The mixtape was greatly popular reaching number 2 in SNEP, the official French Albums Chart, staying for a total of 23 weeks in the chart. It also charted in Ultratop Belgian French Charts and in Switzerland.

== Track listing ==
No.	Title	Writer(s)	Producer(s)	Length
1.	"A4"	Booba	Chris Karmelo	2:33
2.	"Bakel City Gang"	Booba	Therapy (2093 & 2031)	4:46
3.	"Bandana Muzik"	Grödash	Deka	3:18
4.	"Vaisseau mère"	Booba	Therapy (2093 & 2031)	4:09
5.	"Cruella" (featuring Booba)	Shay	Street Fabulous (Prinzly)	3:24
6.	"Problem"	Gato Da Bato	Therapy	3:14
7.	"Fenwick"	Niro	Hall F	3:50
8.	"Scarface"	Booba	Therapy (2093 & 2031)	4:13
9.	"Criminelle League" (featuring Kaaris)	Booba	Therapy (2093 & 2031)	5:02
10.	"Ennemi"	Mala	Bone Collector	4:42
11.	"Privé d'antenne"	Smoker	Wealstarr	4:46
12.	"Pigeons"	Booba	Therapy (2093 & 2031)	3:52
13.	"Le 6 gros"	Linsen (Unité Spéciale)	Therapy (2093 & 2031)	4:45
14.	"Gangster"	Booba	Street Fabulous	5:48
15.	"Life" (featuring JC of The Finest)	Djé	Phat Crispy	4:26
16.	"Corner" (featuring Booba & D.O.E Boy Philly)	Gato da Bato	Street Fabulous (Amir Boudouhi)	4:57
17.	"Paname"	Booba	Therapy (2093 & 2031)	5:19

== Charts ==
Chart (2011)	Peak position
Ultratop Belgian Albums Chart (Wallonia)	32
SNEP French Albums Chart (Wallonia)	2
Hitparade Swiss Albums Chart	64
