= D.U.C =

Studio album by Booba
- Released: 13 April 2015
- Recorded: 2013–2015
- Genre: French rap
- Length: 68:29
- Label: Tallac Records, AZ
- Producer: DJ Easy, DSTprod, Richie Beats, Soulayman FL Beats, Twinsmatic, Wealstarr, X-Plosive, Chris.B, mem's

Booba chronology
Futur 2.0 (2013)	D.U.C (2015)	Nero Nemesis (2015)

Singles from D.U.C
- 1. "OKLM" Released: 26 May 2014; 2. "3G" Released: 12 September 2014; 3. "Tony Sosa" Released: 16 February 2015; 4. "LVMH" Released: 2 April 2015

D.U.C is the seventh studio album by French rapper Booba, it was released on 13 April 2015 by AZ and Tallac Records.

== Track list ==
1. "D.U.C"
2. "Tony Sosa"
3. "Belucci" (feat. Future)
4. "Loin d'ici"
5. "Caracas"
6. "Mon Pays"
7. "All Set" (feat. Jeremih)
8. "Les Meilleurs" (feat. 40000 Gang)
9. "Mové Lang" (feat. Bridjahting & Gato)
10. "LVMH"
11. "G-Love" (feat. Farruko)
12. "Billets Violets"
13. "Ratpis" (feat. Mavado)
14. "Jack Da"
15. "Mr. Kopp"
16. "Temps Mort 2.0" (feat. Lino)
17. "3G"
18. "La mort leur va si bien"
19. "OKLM"
20. "Loin d'ici" (Twinsmatic Mix)

== Charts ==
=== Weekly charts ===
Chart (2015)	Peak position
Belgian Albums (Ultratop Flanders)	40
Belgian Albums (Ultratop Wallonia)	1
French Albums (SNEP)	1
Swiss Albums (Schweizer Hitparade)	2

=== Year-end charts ===
Chart (2015)	Position
Belgian Albums (Ultratop Wallonia)	58
French Albums (SNEP)	43
Chart (2016)	Position
French Albums (SNEP)	140

== Certifications ==
Region	Certification	Certified units/sales
France (SNEP)	Platinum	100,000^{‡}
^{‡} Sales+streaming figures based on certification alone.
