= Autopsie Vol. 2 =

Mixtape by Booba
- Released: 2007
- Genre: French hip hop, Gangsta rap
- Label: Tallac Records, Barclay Records, Universal Music Group
- Compiler: Medi Med

Booba chronology
Ouest Side (2006)	Autopsie Vol. 2 (2007)	0.9 (2008)

Autopsie Vol. 2 is a mixtape by Booba, released in 2007. It contains collaborations with Cut Killer, Mala, Planète Rap, Cassie, Kennedy, Riddla, Dje, Rick Ross, Momma, 113 and others.

== Track listing ==
1. Intro
2. Garcimore
3. Le D.U.C.
4. Freestyle Boulbi (Cut Killer Show)
5. Mix-tape Evolution
6. Tu M'Connais Pas - Mala
7. Freestyle Ouais Ouais (Planète Rap)
8. Me and You remix feat. Cassie
9. All I Have - Naadei
10. Du Biff - 92I
11. Freestyle - Kennedy
12. Nique sa Mère - Kennedy
13. Mauvais Garçon remix feat. Riddla (971)
14. Je Me Souviens (Freestyle)
15. Quoi qu'il arrive feat. Dje
16. Hustlin' remix feat. Rick Ross
17. Ouest Side (freestyle)
18. Remo (Bronx) feat. Momma
19. Patrimoine du Ghetto (Intro)
20. On Sait L'Faire feat. 113
21. Boîte Vocale freestyle
22. Monnaie dans l'Crane - Dje
23. Tout et Tout d'Suite
24. Au Bout des Rêves (freestyle)
25. Outro
26. Le D.U.C. (instrumental)
27. Du Biff (instrumental)
28. Garcimore (instrumental)

== Charts ==
Chart	Peak position
Belgian (Wallonia) Albums Chart	98
French Albums Chart	8
