= Ad vitam æternam =

Studio album by Booba
- Released: 9 February 2024
- Genre: French rap
- Length: 28:33
- Label: Tallac
- Producer: Og's; Wassil; Tysko; Yacine STT; Denza; Capotrck; Yayaonthetrack; Parau; Fastoche; Tnero; DJ Easy; Jonathan Cagne; Rxl & Capotrck; Da Over

Booba chronology
Ultra (2021)	Ad vitam æternam (2024)

Singles from Ad vitam æternam
- 1. "Signé" Released: 16 June 2023; 2. "Sport Billy" Released: 16 November 2023; 3. "6G" Released: 2 February 2024; 4. "Saga" Released: 9 February 2024

Ad vitam æternam is the eleven studio album by French rapper Booba, which was surprise-released on 9 February 2024 through Tallac Records.

== Track listing ==
Ad vitam æternam track listing
No.	Title	Producer(s)	Length
1.	"Rebel"	Og's	2:13
2.	"Saga"	Wassil	3:14
3.	"Dolce Camara" (featuring SDM)	Tysko	2:58
4.	"Sport Billy"	Yacine STT	2:06
5.	"Signé"	Denza	3:01
6.	"6G"	Capotrck	2:52
7.	"GM" (featuring Evil P and Gato)	Yayaonthetrack	3:28
8.	"Abidal" (featuring Sicario)	Parau, Fastoche, Tnero and DJ Easy	2:56
9.	"Bénigni" (featuring Usky)	Jonathan Cagne, Rxl and Capotrck	2:54
10.	"CVBSP"	Da Over	2:51
Total length:			28:33

== Charts ==
Chart performance for Ad vitam æternam
Chart (2024)	Peak position
Belgian Albums (Ultratop Flanders)	137
Belgian Albums (Ultratop Wallonia)	1
French Albums (SNEP)	1
Swiss Albums (Schweizer Hitparade)	3
