= Smog (song) =

Song by Damso

Single by Damso

from the album Lithopédion
- Released: 2018
- Genre: French hip hop
- Length: 2:48
- Label: Capitol, Universal
- Songwriter: Damso
- Producer: Pyroman

Damso singles chronology
"Ipésité" (2018)	"Smog" (2018)	"Feu de bois" (2018)

Music video
- "Smog" on YouTube

"Smog" is a song by Belgian rapper Damso released in 2018.

== Charts ==
Chart performance for "Smog"
Chart	Peak position
Belgium (Ultratop 50 Wallonia)	1
France (SNEP)	1
Switzerland (Schweizer Hitparade)	21
