= Bramsito =

French singer, songwriter, producer

- Birth name: Brian Massamba
- Born: 17 March 1996 (age 29)
- Origin: La Fontaine, Brétigny-sur-Orge, France
- Genres: R&B; urban pop
- Occupation(s): Singer, songwriter, producer
- Years active: 2016–present
- Labels: Podium Entertainment (2016-2017); LosaNalosa Music (2017-present); 7 Corp (2018-2021); H24 Music (2020-present); Play Two (2021-present)

Brian Massamba (born 17 March 1996), known by his stage name Bramsito, is a French singer, songwriter and producer of R&B music and French urban pop. He is signed to 7 Corp founded by Booba.

== Career ==
Bramsito lived for his first 14 years in La Fontaine, a region in Brétigny-sur-Orge before moving to Pithiviers in Loiret. He learned playing the piano starting age 7, and composing when he was 14. In his adolescence, he formed a band "Les Losa" with his friends LFK and Jason Turfu.

In 2016, at the age of 20, he started putting his materials online and was spotted by singer and rapper Fababy who gave him a contract with the label Podium Entertainment. After a disagreement with Fababy, in September 2017 he established his own record label LosaNalosa Music. Soon after, in March 2018, he was approached by French rapper Booba, and signed with Booba's own new label 7 Corp. In November 2018, he recorded "Sale mood" with Booba reaching number 1 in France. The song was certified platinum.

On 31 May 2019, Bramsito released his debut studio album studio Prémices_ reaching number 21 in France followed up by a sophomore album Losa collaborating with Niska in the single "Criminel". In 2020, he signed with H24 Music at the same time continuing with 7 Corp label.

== Discography ==
=== Albums ===
Year	Album	Peak positions			Certification
Year	Album	FRA	BEL Wa	SWI	Certification
2019	Prémices_	21	93	–	
2020	Losa	13	34	58	
2021	Substance	20	35	67	

=== Singles ===
==== As lead artist ====
Year	Title	Peak positions			Album
Year	Title	FRA	BEL Wa	SWI	Album
2018	"Sale mood" (feat. Booba)	1	48	–	Prémices_
2019	"Habiba_"	128	–	–	Losa
2019	"Criminel_" (feat. Niska)	5	–	86	Losa

==== Featured in ====
Year	Title	Peak positions			Album
Year	Title	FRA	BEL Wa	SWI	Album
2021	"Dernière fois" (Booba feat. Bramsito)	10	–	–	Booba album Ultra
2021	"Game Over" (SDM feat. Bramsito)	161	–	–	SDM album Ocho

=== Other songs ===
Year	Title	Peak positions			Album
Year	Title	FRA	BEL Wa	SWI	Album
2019	"Rappelle"	167	–	–	Prémices_
2019	"Millions de mélos" (feat. Soprano)	128	–	–	Prémices_
2020	"Mi Corazon" (feat. Naps)	173	–	–	Losa
2020	"Piccolo" (Gato X Booba X Bramsito)	28	–	–	non-album release
2021	"Sosa"	126	–	–	Substance
2021	"MPLT" (feat. Maes)	68	–	–	Substance
2021	"Papier" (feat. SDM)	158	–	–	Substance
