= List of Ultratop 50 number-one singles of 2024 =

These hits topped the Ultratop 50 in 2024.

Number-one singles of 2024 in Flanders
Flanders
Issue date	Song	Artist	Ref.
6 January	"Prada"	Cassö, Raye and D-Block Europe	
13 January	"Stick Season"	Noah Kahan	
20 January	"Stick Season"	Noah Kahan	
27 January	"Stick Season"	Noah Kahan	
3 February	"Stick Season"	Noah Kahan	
10 February	"Stick Season"	Noah Kahan	
17 February	"Stick Season"	Noah Kahan	
24 February	"Stick Season"	Noah Kahan	
2 March	"Het beste moet nog komen"	Pommelien Thijs	
9 March	"Europapa"	Joost	
16 March	"Europapa"	Joost	
23 March	"Europapa"	Joost	
30 March	"Europapa"	Joost	
6 April	"Texas Hold 'Em"	Beyoncé	
13 April	"Texas Hold 'Em"	Beyoncé	
20 April	"Texas Hold 'Em"	Beyoncé	
27 April	"Beautiful Things"	Benson Boone	
4 May	"I Like the Way You Kiss Me"	Artemas	
11 May	"I Like the Way You Kiss Me"	Artemas	
18 May	"Europapa"	Joost	
25 May	"Europapa"	Joost	
1 June	"Europapa"	Joost	
8 June	"Europapa"	Joost	
15 June	"Stargazing"	Myles Smith	
22 June	"Stargazing"	Myles Smith	
29 June	"Espresso"	Sabrina Carpenter	
6 July	"Stumblin' In"	Cyril	
13 July	"Belong Together"	Mark Ambor	
20 July	"Belong Together"	Mark Ambor	
27 July	"Belong Together"	Mark Ambor	
3 August	"Stargazing"	Myles Smith	
10 August	"Stargazing"	Myles Smith	
17 August	"Stargazing"	Myles Smith	
24 August	"Stargazing"	Myles Smith	
31 August	"Move"	Adam Port and Stryv featuring Malachiii	
7 September	"Ik wil dat je liegt"	Hannah Mae and Maksim	
14 September	"Ik wil dat je liegt"	Hannah Mae and Maksim	
21 September	"Black Friday (Pretty Like the Sun)"	Lost Frequencies and Tom Odell	
28 September	"A Bar Song (Tipsy)"	Shaboozey	
5 October	"Black Friday (Pretty Like the Sun)"	Lost Frequencies and Tom Odell	
12 October	"Die with a Smile"	Lady Gaga and Bruno Mars	
19 October	"Het midden"	Pommelien Thijs and Meau	
26 October	"Het midden"	Pommelien Thijs and Meau	
2 November	"A Bar Song (Tipsy)"	Shaboozey	
9 November	"A Bar Song (Tipsy)"	Shaboozey	
16 November	"Die with a Smile"	Lady Gaga and Bruno Mars	
23 November	"Het midden"	Pommelien Thijs and Meau	
30 November	"That's So True"	Gracie Abrams	
7 December	"That's So True"	Gracie Abrams	
14 December	"That's So True"	Gracie Abrams	
21 December	"That's So True"	Gracie Abrams	
28 December	"Het midden"	Pommelien Thijs and Meau	

Number-one singles of 2024 in Wallonia
Wallonia
Issue date	Song	Artist	Ref.
6 January	"Houdini"	Dua Lipa	
13 January	"Houdini"	Dua Lipa	
20 January	"Houdini"	Dua Lipa	
27 January	"Houdini"	Dua Lipa	
3 February	"Lose Control"	Teddy Swims	
10 February	"Houdini"	Dua Lipa	
17 February	"Ceux qu'on était"	Pierre Garnier	
24 February	"Ceux qu'on était"	Pierre Garnier	
2 March	"Ceux qu'on était"	Pierre Garnier	
9 March	"Ceux qu'on était"	Pierre Garnier	
16 March	"Ceux qu'on était"	Pierre Garnier	
23 March	"Beautiful Things"	Benson Boone	
30 March	"Beautiful Things"	Benson Boone	
6 April	"Beautiful Things"	Benson Boone	
13 April	"Beautiful Things"	Benson Boone	
20 April	"Beautiful Things"	Benson Boone	
27 April	"Beautiful Things"	Benson Boone	
4 May	"Beautiful Things"	Benson Boone	
11 May	"Beautiful Things"	Benson Boone	
18 May	"Beautiful Things"	Benson Boone	
25 May	"Imagine"	Carbonne	
1 June	"Imagine"	Carbonne	
8 June	"Beautiful Things"	Benson Boone	
15 June	"Imagine"	Carbonne	
22 June	"Imagine"	Carbonne	
29 June	"Espresso"	Sabrina Carpenter	
6 July	"Spider"	Gims and Dystinct	
13 July	"Imagine"	Carbonne	
20 July	"Spider"	Gims and Dystinct	
27 July	"Spider"	Gims and Dystinct	
3 August	"Spider"	Gims and Dystinct	
10 August	"Spider"	Gims and Dystinct	
17 August	"Spider"	Gims and Dystinct	
24 August	"Spider"	Gims and Dystinct	
31 August	"Spider"	Gims and Dystinct	
7 September	"Spider"	Gims and Dystinct	
14 September	"Sois pas timide"	Gims	
21 September	"Sois pas timide"	Gims	
28 September	"Sois pas timide"	Gims	
5 October	"Sois pas timide"	Gims	
12 October	"Sois pas timide"	Gims	
19 October	"Cartier Santos"	SDM	
26 October	"Cartier Santos"	SDM	
2 November	"Sois pas timide"	Gims	
9 November	"Sois pas timide"	Gims	
16 November	"Sois pas timide"	Gims	
23 November	"Sois pas timide"	Gims	
30 November	"Sois pas timide"	Gims	
7 December	"Ma meilleure ennemie"	Stromae and Pomme	
14 December	"Nanani Nanana"	Gazo	
21 December	"Nanani Nanana"	Gazo	
28 December	"Ma meilleure ennemie"	Stromae and Pomme	

Flanders ranking of most weeks at number 1
Position	Artist	Weeks #1
1	Joost	8
2	Noah Kahan	7
3	Myles Smith	6
4	Pommelien Thijs	5
5	Gracie Abrams	4
5	Meau	4
6	Beyoncé	3
6	Mark Ambor	3
6	Shaboozey	3
7	Artemas	2
7	Hannah Mae	2
7	Maksim	2
7	Lost Frequencies	2
7	Tom Odell	2
7	Lady Gaga	2
7	Bruno Mars	2
8	Cassö	1
8	Raye	1
8	D-Block Europe	1
8	Benson Boone	1
8	Sabrina Carpenter	1
8	Cyril	1
8	Adam Port	1
8	Stryv	1
8	Malachiii	1

Wallonia ranking of most weeks at number 1
Position	Artist	Weeks #1
1	Gims	19
2	Benson Boone	10
3	Dystinct	9
4	Dua Lipa	5
4	Pierre Garnier	5
4	Carbonne	5
5	SDM	2
5	Gazo	2
5	Stromae	2
5	Pomme	2
6	Teddy Swims	1
6	Sabrina Carpenter	1

== See also ==
- List of number-one albums of 2024 (Belgium)
- 2024 in music
