= Temps mort =

Studio album by Booba
- Released: 22 January 2002
- Genre: French hip-hop
- Length: 59:00
- Label: 45 Scientifique
- Producer: Fred Dudouet; Geraldo; Animalsons; Julien Dicano; Full Moon

Booba chronology
Mauvais œil (2000)	Temps mort (2002)	Panthéon (2004)

Singles from Temps Mort
- 1. "Repose en paix" Released: 2002; 2. "Strass et paillettes" Released: 2002; 3. "Destinée" Released: 11 November 2002

Alternative covers
- Vinyl cover

Alternative cover
- New edition cover

Professional ratings
Review scores
Source	Rating
Rap2k	link

Temps mort (pronounced [tɑ̃ mɔʁ]; lit. 'Time out') is the debut album by French rapper Booba. For the song "Nouvelle école" exists also a remix which features American rap duo Mobb Deep.

== Track listing ==
#	Title	Producer(s)	Featured guest(s)	Length
1	"Temps mort" ("Time out")	Fred Dudouet		2:26
2	"Indépendants" ("Independent")	Geraldo		3:53
3	"Écoute bien" ("Listen carefully")	Fred Dudouet		4:32
4	"Ma définition" ("My definition")	Fred Dudouet		3:36
5	"Jusqu'ici tout va bien" ("So far so good")	Fred Dudouet		4:48
6	"Repose en paix" ("Rest in peace")	Animalsons		2:52
7	"Le bitume avec une plume" ("The asphalt with a feather")	Animalsons		4:44
8	"Animals"	Fred Dudouet	Lim, Moussa	4:36
9	"Sans ratures" ("Without erasures")	Julien Dicano	Nessbeal	4:32
10	"Interlude"	Julien Dicano		2:07
11	"100-8 Zoo"	Animalsons	Malekal Morte, Sir Doum's	6:42
12	"On m'a dit" ("I was told")	Animalsons		4:15
13	"Nouvelle école" ("New school")	Full Moon	Mala	4:15
14	"De mauvaise augure" ("A bad omen")	Fred Dudouet		3:34
15	"Strass et paillettes" ("Sparkle and sequins")	Animalsons	Ali	4:49
16	"Destinée" ("Destiny")	Animalsons	Kayna Samet	5:13
17	"Inédit" ("Unreleased")	Animalsons		3:57

== Samples ==
- "Indépendants" contains a sample of "Hunting in Packs" by Trevor Rabin.
- "Écoute bien" contains a sample of "Yumeji's Theme" by Michael Galasso.
- "Jusqu'ici tout va bien" contains a sample of "The Inner Child" by Mike Oldfield.
- "Repose en paix" contains a sample of "Eleanor Rigby" by Vanilla Fudge, original by The Beatles.
- "Le bitume avec une plume" contains a sample of "Mistral gagnant" by Renaud.
- "Strass et paillettes" contains a sample of "Children of the Sun" by Mandrill.

== Charts ==
Chart (2002)	Peak position
Belgian Albums (Ultratop Wallonia)	41
French Albums (SNEP)	2

== Certifications ==
Region	Certification	Certified units/sales
France (SNEP)	Gold	100,000^{*}
^{*} Sales figures based on certification alone.
