= Shay (rapper) =

Belgian rapper (born 1992)

- Born: August 16, 1992 (age 34); Brussels, Belgium
- Other names: Jolie Garce, JGG, Shay Izi
- Occupation: Rapper
- Years active: 2009–Present
- Relatives: Tabu Ley Rochereau (grandfather)
- Website: https://joliegarcerecords.com/

Vanessa Lesnicki (French pronunciation: [vanɛsa leniki]; born 16 August 1992 in Brussels), known by her stage name Shay (/ʃaɪ/, SHYE; French: [ʃaj]), is a Belgian francophone rapper. After a collaboration with Booba in 2011, she has released many songs, notably a hit with "XCII" on the record label 92i. Her debut album Jolie Garce was released on 2 December 2016 and was certified gold. Her sophomore album Antidote was released on 10 May 2019. Her third Studio Album Pourvu qu'il pleuve was released on January 19, 2024 under her own Label Jolie Garce Records. Her style is a combination of hip-hop, trap, urban pop and R&B. Previously signed to Capitol Music, now she is signed to Because Music, under her own Label Jolie Garce Records.

== Early life ==
Shay was born in Brussels, Belgium. Her father is Belgian (whose father was a Polish Jew who married a Belgian), and her mother is Congolese. On her mother's side, Shay is the granddaughter of singer Tabu Ley Rochereau.

== Musical career ==
In 2014, Shay joined the 92i label of her mentor Booba and released several singles like XCII and 1200. In early summer 2016, Shay released the first single from her album, entitled PMW, which was certified as platinum. On 7 October 2016, Shay released the music video of the song Biche from her album, which was viewed more than 7 million times. Her song Cabeza was released a few weeks late, and went on to be certified gold. On 17 February 2017, Shay released the music video of her single, Thibaut Courtois, dedicated to the goalkeeper of the Belgium national team with the same name. This song was also certified gold.

In 2018, Shay posted an extract from a track entitled Notif on social networks. She also unveiled her return to the studio with producers Heezy Lee, Junior à la Prod and Le Motif on Instagram. At the same time, Shay also collaborated with Jul on the track Pim Pom, taken from the latter's album Inspi d'ailleurs.

She made her comeback and released the track Jolie on 30 November 2018, accompanied by a video clip directed by Guillaume Doubet. On 11 January 2019, Shay released Cocorico, the second single from her new album, which she had previously announced would be released in 2019. On 22 February 2019, she released the track Notif, accompanied by a video clip that, like the video for Jolie, was directed by Guillaume Doubet. Her second album, Antidote, was released on 10 May 2019. On 1 July, she released the video for the song Liquide, a duet with French rapper Niska. The track was certified gold.

== Discography ==
=== Albums ===
Title	Album details	Peak positions			Certifications
Title	Album details	BEL (Wa)	FRA	SWI	Certifications
Jolie Garce	Released: 2 December 2016; Label: 92i, Capitol Music France; Formats: CD, streaming, digital download	48	60	—	SNEP: Platinum
Antidote	Released: 10 May 2019; Label: Capitol Music France; Formats: CD, streaming, digital download	5	15	43	SNEP: Gold
Pourvu qu'il pleuve	Released: 19 January 2024; Label: Because Music, Virgin; Formats: CD, streaming, digital download	3	3	9	

=== Singles ===
==== As lead artist ====
Title	Year	Peak positions		Certifications	Album
Title	Year	BEL (Wa)	FRA	Certifications	Album
"XCII"	2015	—	153		Non-album song
"PMW"	2016	9 (Ultratip*)	33	SNEP: Platinum	Jolie Garce
"Biche"	2016	—	72		Jolie Garce
"Cabeza"	2016	29 (Ultratip*)	107	SNEP: Gold	Jolie Garce
"Jolie"	2018	30 (Ultratip*)	38		Antidote
"Cocorico"	2019	—	102		Antidote
"Notif"	2019	15 (Ultratip*)	22	* SNEP: Gold	Antidote
"DA"	2022	—	40		Non-album singles
"Jolie Go"	2023	—	32	* SNEP: Platinum	Non-album singles
"Comando"	2023	—	61		Non-album singles
"Sans cœur" (featuring Niska)	2023	42	5		Non-album singles

*Did not appear in the official Belgian Ultratop 50 charts, but rather in the bubbling under Ultratip charts.

==== Other charted songs ====
Title	Year	Peak positions		Certifications	Album
Title	Year	BEL (Wa)	FRA	Certifications	Album
"Thibaut Courtois"	2016	16 (Ultratip*)	39	SNEP: Gold	Jolie Garce
"La go"	2016	—	178		Jolie Garce
"Liquide" (feat. Niska)	2019	—	21	SNEP: Gold	Antidote
"Ich liebe dich"	2019	—	73		Antidote
"Cœur Wanted"	2019	—	87		Antidote
"Amour & Ses désastres"	2019	—	107		Antidote
"Même pas bonne"	2019	—	111	SNEP: Gold	Antidote
"Désillusions"	2019	—	114		Antidote
"Pleurer"	2019	—	152		Antidote
"Villa"	2019	—	174		Antidote
"Oh oui"	2019	—	192		Antidote
"Prends ton time"	2019	—	200		Antidote

*Did not appear in the official Belgian Ultratop 50 charts, but rather in the bubbling under Ultratip charts.

==== As featured artist ====
Title	Year	Peak positions	Certifications	Album
Title	Year	FRA	Certifications	Album
"Ivre" (Benash feat. Shay & Damso)	2017	75	SNEP: Gold	CDG
"Guerrier" (Fally Ipupa feat. Shay & Damso)	2017	—		Tokoos
"Pim pom" (Jul feat. Shay)	2018	33		Inspi d'ailleurs
"Kobe" (Fresh feat. Shay)	2022	27		Non-album song

== Filmography ==
=== Television ===
Year	Title	Role	Notes
2021	Rhythm + Flow: Nouvelle École	Judge	Released on Netflix
