= 0.9 =

Album by Booba

Studio album by Booba
- Released: 24 November 2008
- Recorded: 2008
- Genre: French hip hop, gangsta rap
- Length: 58:00
- Label: Tallac Records, Barclay Records, Universal Music Group
- Producer: Medi Med; Therapy phreQuincy; Animalsons; Oneshot; Dream Touch; BKS; Haze; Street Fabulous

Booba chronology
Autopsie Vol. 2 (2007)	0.9 (2008)	Autopsie Vol. 3 (2009)

Singles from 0.9
- 1. "B2OBA" Released: 2008; 2. "Illégal" Released: 6 October 2008; 3. "Game Over" Released: 2009

Professional ratings
Review scores
Source	Rating
Rap2k	14/20 stars

0.9 is the fourth album by French rapper Booba and released on 24 November 2008 on Tallac Records via the major Barclay Records / Universal Music Group.

== Track listing ==
#	Title	Composer(s)	Feature(s)	Length
1	"Intro"	DJ Medi Med		0:18
2	"Izi monnaie" ("IZI money")	Therapy		2:40
3	"B2OBA"	Phrequincy		3:12
4	"Illégal" ("Illegal")	Animalsons		4:33
5	"Garcimore"	Oneshot		3:30
6	"Izi Life" ("IZI life")	Dream Touch	92i (Bram's & Mala)	5:37
7	"King"	James BKS Edjouma	Rock City	4:07
8	"Salade Tomates Oignons"	Haze	Djé	4:13
9	"Bad Boy Street"	Animalsons	DeMarco	4:32
10	"Game Over"	Oneshot		4:20
11	"Soldats" ("Soldiers")	Therapy	Naadei	3:16
12	"R.A.S."	Street Fabulous		5:04
13	"Pourvu Qu'elles M'Aiment" ("Provided that they love me")	Street Fabulous		4:00
14	"Marche Ou Crève" ("Walk or die")	Oneshot		4:28
15	0.9	Therapy		4:10

=== Streaming bonus track ===
#	Title	Composer(s)	Length
14	"Marche Ou Crève (Busy P Remix)"	Busy P	3:42

== Charts ==
Chart	Peak position
Belgian (Wallonia) Albums Chart	27
French Albums Chart	2
Swiss Albums Chart	60
