= Benash =

French rapper (born 1994)

- Born: Simon Laroche Nganou Noubissie; 16 February 1994 (age 32); Douala, Cameroon
- Origin: Boulogne-Billancourt, France
- Genres: French rap, trap
- Occupation: Rapper
- Years active: 2012-present
- Labels: 92i, Capitol, Universal

Simon Laroche Nganou Noubissie, better known by the stage name Benash (born in Douala, Cameroon on 16 February 1994), is a Cameroonian-born French rapper from Boulogne-Billancourt, Hauts-de-Seine. He began his career as a member of the band 40000 Gang, before going solo under the wing of Booba.

== History ==
=== Early life ===
Benash was born in Douala, Cameroon. He moved to Boulogne-Billancourt, France, at the age of six.

=== Career ===
==== 40000 Gang (2012-2015) ====
In 2012, Benash joined the SDHS Family (Soldats Des Hauts de Seine Family), a band formed by friends from his neighborhood of which he appeared in the clips before integrating it. The band collaborated with Booba in February 2014 on the title "Porsche Panamera". During 2014, the group renamed itself "40000 Gang". Worn by the titles "Sosa", "César", "40K" and "Paris m'a tué", 40000 Gang released their first and only project, a mixtape called "Anarchy", on 29 June 2015, under 92i. The mixtape experienced a commercial failure selling only 2,642 copies on its first week despite the promotion offered by Booba.

==== CDG and NHB (2015-2019) ====
In August 2015, Benash featured on Booba's single "Validée". in October 2015, he featured on Alonzo's track "Cauchemar". In December of the same year, Benash released his first single entitled "IVMT (Ils Veulent Me Tuer)". Not very active in 2016, he unveiled the title "Larmes" in February.

In February 2017, Benash released his single "CDG (Chef De Guerre)" and shortly after he announced the release of his first eponymous solo album. In March 2017, Benash released "Ghetto" featuring Booba. The video clip of "Ghetto" was shot in Cameroon and released at the end of March, and the song was certified gold two months after. "CDG" was released on 31 March 2017 and featured guest appearances from Alonzo, Booba, Darki, Siboy, Shay and Damso. The album went gold in November of the same year. In June 2017, Benash and Damso featured on Siboy's "Mobali" which went platinum in October of the same year.

On 11 October 2019, Benash released his second album entitled "NHB".

== Discography ==
=== Albums ===
Title	Year	Peak positions			Units
Title	Year	FRA	BEL (Wa)	SWI	Units
CDG	2017	12	93	72	
NHB	2019	50	117	—	

=== Singles ===
Title	Year	Peak positions		Album
Title	Year	FRA	BEL (Wa)	Album
"Larmes"	2016	94	—	—N/a
"Ghetto" (featuring Booba)	2017	10	16* (Ultratip)	CDG
"Coco"	2017	80	—	CDG
"Ivre" (featuring Shay & Damso)	2017	75	—	CDG
"Cardi B"	2018	85	—	NHB
"NHB"	2019	163	—	NHB

*Did not appear in the official Belgian Ultratop 50 charts, but rather in the bubbling under Ultratip charts.

=== Featured in ===
Title	Year	Peak positions		Album, EP or mixtape
Title	Year	FRA	BEL (Wa)	Album, EP or mixtape
"Validée" (Booba featuring Benash)	2015	2	41	Booba album Nero Nemesis
"Cauchemar" (Alonzo featuring Benash)	2015	131	—	Alonzo mixtape Capo dei capi, Vol. 1
"Zer" (Booba featuring Siboy & Benash)	2015	120	—	Booba album Nero Nemesis
"Mobali" (Siboy featuring Benash & Damso)	2017	10	6* (Ultratip)	Siboy album Spécial

- Did not appear in the official Belgian Ultratop 50 charts, but rather in the bubbling under Ultratip charts.
