= Panthéon (album) =

Studio album by Booba
- Released: 16 June 2004
- Recorded: 2004
- Genre: French hip hop; Gangsta rap
- Length: 52:00
- Label: Tallac Records; Barclay Records; Universal Music Group
- Producer: Skread; Medi Med; Kore & Skalp; Animalsons; Medeline

Booba chronology
Temps mort (2002)	Panthéon (2004)	Autopsie Vol. 1 (2005)

Professional ratings
Review scores
Source	Rating
Rap2k	14/20 stars

Panthéon (pronounced [pɑ̃teɔ̃]; French, 'Pantheon') is the second album by French rapper Booba, released on 16 June 2004 over Tallac Records, via the major Barclay Records/Universal Music Group.

== Track listing ==
#	Title	Producer(s)	Featured guest(s)	Length
1	"Tallac"	Skread		4:04
2	"Le Mal par le Mal" ("Evil by Evil")	Medi Med, Kore & Skalp		2:06
3	"Commis d'office"	Kore & Skalp	Mala	5:09
4	"N°10" (pronounced "Numéro dix"; "Number 10")	Animalsons		4:37
5	"Hors-saison" ("Off-Season")	Animalsons		4:42
6	"R.A.P."	Animalsons	Sir Doum's	3:56
7	"Baby"	Skread	Nessbeal	4:31
8	"La faucheuse" ("The Reaper")	Kore & Skalp		4:40
9	"Mon son" ("My sound")	Medeline		2:49
10	"Alter égo" ("Alter ego")	Animalsons	Wayne Wonder	4:14
11	"Pazalaza pour sazamuser" ("Not here for fun")	Medeline	Issaka, Bram's	2:45
12	"Bâtiment C" ("Building C")	Kore & Skalp		3:42
13	"Avant de partir" ("Before leaving")	Four Tracks	Léya Masry	5:25

Samples

- "Tallac" contains a sample of "Max" by Bernard Herrmann.
- "Le Mal par le Mal" contains a sample of "Tout c'qu'on connait" by Booba & Nessbeal
- "Mon son" contains a sample of "Hold the Line" by Toto.

== Singles ==
2004 : N°10
2004 : Baby (feat. Nessbeal)
2004 : Avant De Partir (feat. Léya Masry)

== Charts ==
=== Weekly charts ===
Chart (2004)	Peak position
Belgian Albums (Ultratop Wallonia)	26
French Albums (SNEP)	3
Swiss Albums (Schweizer Hitparade)	25

=== Year-end charts ===
Chart (2004)	Position
French Albums (SNEP)	72

== Certifications ==
Region	Certification	Certified units/sales
France (SNEP)	Gold	100,000^{*}
^{*} Sales figures based on certification alone.

== In popular culture ==
The song "N°10" is the entrance song for French UFC fighter Cheick Kongo.
