= Green Montana =

- Also known as: Greenzer
- Born: Arnaud Nsita; June 15, 1993 (age 33); Verviers, Belgium
- Genres: Hip-hop, Mumble rap, House music, Drill music
- Occupation: Rapper
- Years active: 2015-present
- Label: NMR / North - Nouveau Monde Riche

Green Montana is a Belgian rapper, born June 15, 1993, in Verviers. Active since 2015, he gained visibility when rapper Booba signed him to his label 92i Records in 2019. The artist has so far released 3 albums and 5 EP's. He has various collaborations with rappers Booba, SDM, Koba LaD, and Isha or OldPee of 13 Block group.

== Discography ==
=== Albums ===
- Alaska (2020)
- Nostalgia+ (2022)
- Saudade (2024)

=== EPs ===
- Bleu Nuit (2018)
- Orange Métallique (2018)
- Melancholia 999 (2021)
- Rouge Néon (2023)
- Melancholia4099 (2026)
