= Futur (album) =

Studio album by Booba
- Released: 26 November 2012; 25 November 2013 (Re-issue)
- Genres: French hip hop; gangsta rap; trap
- Length: 61:12
- Labels: Tallac; Universal Music Group
- Producers: Therapy (2093 & 2031); Fantomm; Thomas Join-Lambert; Thomas Broussard; Vader; Melomayne; Young Chop

Booba chronology
Autopsie Vol. 4 (2011)	Futur (2012)	Futur 2.0 (2013)

Re-issue cover

Singles from Futur
- 1. "Caramel" Released: 22 September 2012; 2. "Tombé pour elle" Released: 23 November 2012

Singles from Futur 2.0
- 1. "Turfu" Released: 21 June 2013; 2. "RTC" Released: 20 September 2013; 3. "Parlons peu" Released: 4 November 2013

Futur (French pronunciation: [fytyʁ]) is the sixth album by French rapper Booba, released on 26 November 2012 on Tallac Records, via the major Universal Music Group.

The album was re-issued in a two-disc set a Futur 2.0 on 25 November 2013 almost exactly one year after the original release.

The first CD of Futur 2.0 has the same tracks as the original Futur, while CD 2 includes eight new tracks not found on the original release.

== Track listing ==
No.	Title	Producer(s)	Length
1.	"G5"	Therapy (2093 et 2031)	1:34
2.	"Maki Sall Music"	Therapy	4:55
3.	"Wesh Morray"	Therapy and Fantomm	4:15
4.	"Tombé pour elle"	MdL	3:29
5.	"C'est la vie" (featuring 2 Chainz)	Therapy	4:27
6.	"Pirates"	Therapy	3:47
7.	"Caramel"	Therapy and Lecrae	4:20
8.	"Kalash" (featuring Kaaris)	Therapy	3:49
9.	"1.8.7" (featuring Rick Ross)	Therapy	4:30
10.	"O.G." (featuring Mala)	Therapy	3:48
11.	"Jimmy"	Thomas Join-Lambert, Thomas Broussard	3:17
12.	"Maitre Yoda"	Therapy and Fantomm	3:15
13.	"Rolex" (featuring Gato)	Therapy and Fantomm	4:19
14.	"Tout c'que j'ai"	Therapy	3:43
15.	"2Pac"	Therapy	4:01
16.	"Futur"	Vader, Melomayne	3:33
Total length:			61:12

iTunes bonus track
No.	Title	Producer(s)	Length
17.	"Billets verts"	Therapy	2:29

Futur 2.0 bonus disc
No.	Title	Producer(s)	Length
1.	"2.0"	Therapy	3:06
2.	"A.C. Milan"	Therapy	4:41
3.	"Turfu"	Therapy	5:16
4.	"Une vie"	Therapy	4:12
5.	"Parlons peu"	Therapy	3:40
6.	"RTC"	Young Chop	3:41
7.	"Longueur d'avance" (featuring Maître Gims)	Therapy	3:45
8.	"T.L.T"	Therapy	5:11
9.	"Billets Vert"	Therapy	2:29

== Charts ==
=== Weekly charts ===
Futur

Chart (2012)	Peak position
Belgian Albums (Ultratop Flanders)	74
Belgian Albums (Ultratop Wallonia)	5
French Albums (SNEP)	4
Swiss Albums (Schweizer Hitparade)	14

Futur 2.0

Chart (2013)	Peak position
Swiss Albums (Schweizer Hitparade)	28

=== Year-end charts ===
Futur

Chart (2012)	Position
Belgian Albums (Ultratop Wallonia)	93
French Albums (SNEP)	43

Chart (2013)	Position
Belgian Albums (Ultratop Wallonia)	90
French Albums (SNEP)	73

Chart (2014)	Position
Belgian Albums (Ultratop Wallonia)	183

== Certifications ==
Region	Certification	Certified units/sales
France (SNEP)	3× Platinum	300,000^{*}
^{*} Sales figures based on certification alone.
