= Nero Nemesis =

Studio album by Booba
- Released: 4 December 2015
- Recorded: 2015
- Genre: French rap
- Length: 48:42
- Label: Tallac Records, AZ

Booba chronology
D.U.C (2015)	Nero Nemesis (2015)	Autopsie 0 (2017)

Singles from Nero Nemesis
- 1. "Validée" Released: 31 August 2015; 2. "Attila" Released: 23 September 2015; 3. "Génération Assassin" Released: 27 November 2015; 4. "4G" Released: 17 December 2015; 5. "92i Veyron" Released: 5 February 2016

Nero Nemesis is the eighth studio album by French rapper Booba, which was released on 4 December 2015 by AZ and Tallac Records.

== Track listing ==
1. "Walabok" (3:05)
2. "Talion" (4:02)
3. "Zer" (featuring Siboy & Benash) (4:40)
4. "92i Veyron" (3:37)
5. "Validée" (featuring Benash) (3:25)
6. "Attila" (2:48)
7. "Charbon" (3:38)
8. "U2K" (featuring Twinsmatic) (4:06)
9. "Génération Assassin" (2:23)
10. "Pinocchio" (featuring Damso & Gato) (4:20)
11. "Comme les autres" (4:38)
12. "Habibi" (4:05)
13. "4G" (3:55)

== Charts ==
=== Weekly charts ===
Chart (2015)	Peak position
Belgian Albums (Ultratop Flanders)	127
Belgian Albums (Ultratop Wallonia)	7
French Albums (SNEP)	7
Swiss Albums (Schweizer Hitparade)	9

=== Year-end charts ===
Chart (2015)	Position
Belgian Albums (Ultratop Wallonia)	101
French Albums (SNEP)	63
Chart (2016)	Position
Belgian Albums (Ultratop Wallonia)	98
French Albums (SNEP)	45

== Certifications ==
Region	Certification	Certified units/sales
France (SNEP)	Platinum	100,000^{‡}
^{‡} Sales+streaming figures based on certification alone.
