= JSX (rapper) =

French rapper

JSX is a French rapper originating from Seine-Saint-Denis.

== Career ==
He started early as a music artist. In 2010 he became part of the Grizily Gang band. He later on released a series of clips entitled Drug Dealer and attracted the attention of Booba who signed him to his new label Piraterie Music. JSX became the first artist to be signed to the label. He released "Pompeii" that featured Booba. Booba in return featured JSX on his hit "Mona Lisa" reaching number 1 on the French Singles Chart.

== Discography ==
=== Singles ===
Lead singer

Year	Title	Peak positions	Album
Year	Title	FRA	Album
2020	"Pompeii" (feat. Booba)	8	
2021	"Papel"	167	
2021	"GTA" (feat. Booba)	20	

Featured in

Year	Title	Peak positions			Album
Year	Title	FRA	BEL Wa	SWI	Album
2021	"Mona Lisa" (Booba feat. JSX)	1	2	7	Booba album Ultra
