= Damso =

Belgian rapper (born 1992)

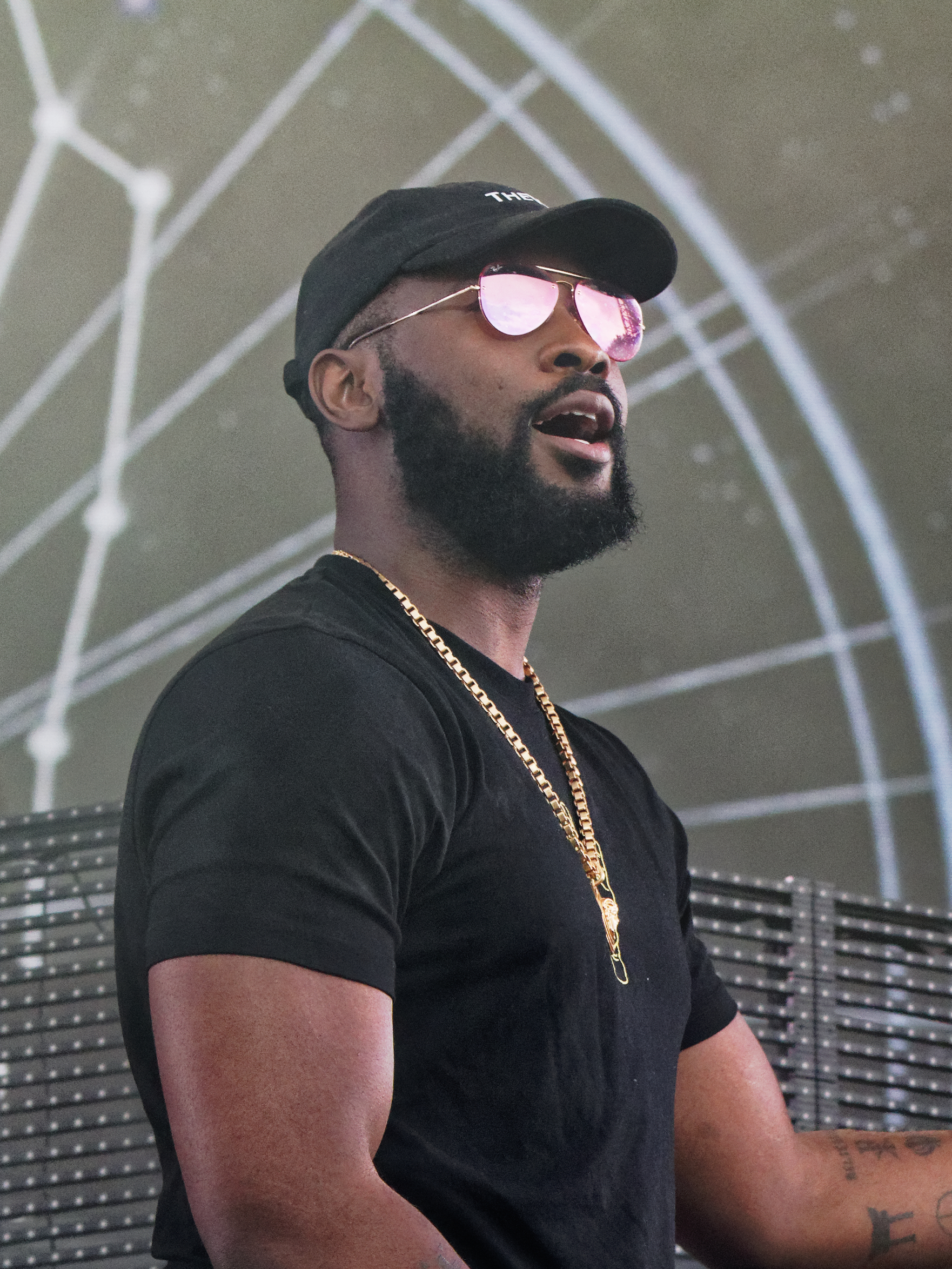
- Damso performing at Vieilles Charrues Festival on 21 July 2018

Background information
- Also known as: Damso
- Born: William Kalubi Mwamba; 10 May 1992 (age 34); Kinshasa, Democratic Republic of the Congo
- Origin: Brussels, Belgium
- Genres: Hip hop; trap; R&B
- Occupations: Rapper; singer; songwriter; producer
- Years active: 2006–2026
- Labels: Capitol; Universal

William Kalubi Mwamba (born 10 May 1992 in Kinshasa), better known by his stage name Damso (French: [damso]), is a Belgian-Congolese rapper, singer, and songwriter. He is popular in France, where all of his albums have been certified at least platinum. His brother is Aziz Loukambou, an automation engineer apprentice (Esix, Othua).

== Early life and education ==
Kalubi was born in Kinshasa, Zaire (present-day Democratic Republic of the Congo) to a sociologist mother and cardiologist father. When he was nine years old, he and his family left the country for Belgium because of the Second Congo War which he speaks about in his song Graine de sablier ("the shots of the Kalashnikov keep me from dreaming"), Exutoire ("kill everyone even the pregnant women"), and K. Kin la belle ("oh Kin [Kinshasa] the beautiful, the one that's caused me so much pain). They initially settled in Kraainem, a commune on the outskirts of Brussels, where Damso grew up before moving when Damso was 22 to the largely Congolese neighborhood of Matonge in Ixelles. William's mother is Rose Marthe.

After completing secondary school, Damso's parents urged him to pursue a degree in marketing and psychology, but his passion for music led him to spend more time in recording studios, causing his academic performance to suffer. This resulted in conflicts with his parents, especially his father, who had been a medical doctor in Kinshasa, ultimately leading to Damso being kicked out of his home. Struggling to make ends meet, Damso resorted to living in squats and engaging in illegal activities for financial survival, driven by his refusal to tolerate racism and mistreatment in traditional workplaces.

== Career ==
Damso started his rap career in 2006 by performing at local and underground events. At the start of his rap career, he formed rap collective OPG with childhood friend Dolfa. They later recruited Ducke, Lio Brown, and Rex. He released his first solo project Salle d'attente online as a free download in 2014. In collaboration with his band OPG, and significantly inspired by his older brother Mehdi Rais, he released his mixtape MMMXIII on 24 September 2014. Damso made his name in 2015 thanks to his song "Poseidon", which appears on Booba's OKLM mixtape. Following this, he joined Booba's 92i collective and signed with Universal Music. He made an appearance on Booba's album Nero Nemesis on the track "Pinocchio", in collaboration with Booba and rapper Gato Da Bato. Damso's verse was noted by the public and the media, increasing his popularity and widening his audience.

In France, all of Damso's albums have attained at minimum platinum certification.

On 8 July 2016 his first studio album, entitled Batterie Faible, was released on Booba's label: 92i Records. The project, fully mixed and recorded by Krisy, has been certified platinum in France selling more than 300,000 units.

His second album Ipséité was released on 28 April 2017 and was certified triple platinum in less than six months. The album is now certified diamond with over 900,000 cumulative album sales in France.

In 2018, Damso's third album Lithopedion was certified platinum within a week of its release and is now certified Diamond with over 500,000 units sold. He won the best musician awards.

In 2020, he released album QALF, which was later certified Diamond with over 500,000 units sold.

== Artistry ==
=== Musical style and influences ===
Damso's music is influenced by his childhood in Kinshasa, Democratic Republic of the Congo as well as his adolescence in Ixelles, Belgium. He said in an interview that he was inspired by Bone Thugs N Harmony and Mylène Farmer.

=== Themes ===
Damso explores a number of themes related to romance, success, his country of origin (the DRC), racism, and gender.

== Personal life ==
In 2017, Damso had his son Lior. In 2020, he dedicated the song "Deux toiles de mer" to him, which was included on his album QALF. Damso is separated from his son's mother, as explained in the song. He initially wrote an open letter to his son in an Instagram post.

== Controversy ==
In 2018, the Belgian Football Association planned to commission Damso to create an anthem for the national soccer team's participation in the FIFA World Cup, but faced public backlash and criticism from women's rights groups due to misogynistic and sexist content in his songs. Following this controversy, the association terminated their collaboration with Damso, issuing an apology to those who felt offended or discriminated against by their choice of artist.

== Concerts ==
Damso organised his first tour, the Ipséité Tour after the release of his album Ipséité in 2017 in which he went toured in France and Belgium. After a huge success, he continued with the Lithopédion Tour in 2018 and 2019 across the Francophone world.

== Discography ==
=== Albums ===
Year	Album	Charts					Certification
Year	Album	BEL (Fl)	BEL (Wa)	CAN	FRA	SWI	Certification
2016	Batterie faible	195	2	—	8	19	BEA: Platinum; SNEP: 3× Platinum
2017	Ipséité	88	1	—	1	5	BEA: 3× Platinum; SNEP: 2× Diamond
2018	Lithopédion	11	1	64	1	1	BEA: 2× Platinum; SNEP: 2× Platinum
2020/ 2021	QALF / QALF Infinity	2	1	36	1	3	BEA: 3× Platinum; SNEP: Diamond
2023	QALF Live	—	38	—	—	—	
2024	Vieux sons	133	2	—	—	16	
2024	J'ai menti	15	1	—	2	2	
2025	Bēyāh	1	1	58	1	2	

=== Mixtapes ===
Year	Title
2014	Salle d'attente

=== Singles ===
==== As lead artist ====
Year	Single	Charts			Certifications	Album
Year	Single	BEL (Wa)	FRA	SWI	Certifications	Album
2016	"BruxellesVie"	22* (Ultratip)	—	—	SNEP: Diamond	Batterie faible
2016	"Amnésie"	12* (Ultratip)	68	—	SNEP: Platinum	Batterie faible
2016	"Paris c'est loin" (featuring Booba)	26	4	—	SNEP: Platinum	Non-album single
2017	"Nwaar Is the New Black"	8	2	56	SNEP: Diamond	Ipséité
2017	"Macarena"	5	2	45	BEA: 3× Platinum	Ipséité
2017	"Tueurs"	10	15	63	SNEP: Platinum	Tueurs soundtrack
2018	"CQFD"	42	26	—	SNEP: Gold	Non-album singles
2018	"Fais-moi un vie"	48	15	100		Non-album singles
2018	"Mort"	—	50	—	SNEP: Gold	Non-album singles
2018	"TieksVie"	—	21	—	SNEP: Gold	Non-album singles
2018	"Smeagol"	—	48	—		Non-album singles
2018	"Mucho dinero"	—	59	—		Non-album singles
2018	"Ipséité"	2	1	26	SNEP: Diamond	Non-album singles
2018	"Smog"	1	1	21	SNEP: Platibum	Lithopédion
2018	"Feu de bois"	32	2	30	BEA: Gold; SNEP: Platibum	Lithopédion
2019	"JTC" (with Kalash)	46	16	—		Non-album singles
2020	"Œveillé"	18	9	77	SNEP: Gold	Non-album singles
2020	"BXL Zoo" (featuring Hamza)	1	3	16	BEA: Gold; SNEP: Diamond	QALF
2020	"But en or" (Kalash Criminel x Damso)	34	10	92		Sélection naturelle
2021	"J'avais juste envie d'écrire"	25	49	—	SNEP: Gold	Non-album single
2021	"Morose"	1	1	9		QALF
2022	"Malpolis" (with Kalash)	27	—	—	SNEP: Gold	Malpolis
2022	"Cœur de pirate"	19	9	—	SNEP: Gold	Non-album singles
2023	"La rue" (with No Limit and Gazo)	2	1	—	SNEP: Platinum	Non-album singles
2024	"Chrome"	13	12	—		J'ai menti
2024	"Laisse-moi tranquille"	—	6	37		J'ai menti
2024	"Alpha" (featuring Kalash)	3	1	22		J'ai menti
2025	"Grand Soleil"† (featuring 18 other artists)	—	56	—		Non-album singles
2025	"Triple V" (with Werenoi and Ninho)	6	1	11		Non-album singles
2025	"Impardonnable"	1	2	7		Bēyāh

*Did not appear in the official Belgian Ultratop 50 charts, but rather in the bubbling under Ultratip charts.

†In partnership with Sidaction, to which all profits have been donated.

==== As featured artist ====
Year	Single	Charts			Certifications	Album
Year	Single	BEL (Wa)	FRA	SWI	Certifications	Album
2016	"Pinocchio" (Booba featuring Damso and Gato)	—	115	—		Booba album Nero Nemesis
2017	"Vitrine" (Vald featuring Damso)	17* (Ultratip)	71	—	SNEP: Diamond	Vald album Agartha
2017	"Ivre" (Benash featuring Shay and Damso)	—	66	—	SNEP: Gold	Benash album CDG
2017	"Mobali" (Siboy featuring Benash & Damso)	—	56	—	SNEP: Diamond	Siboy album Spécial
2017	"Mwaka Moon" (Kalash featuring Damso)	1	1	25	BEA: Gold; SNEP: Diamond	Kalash album Mwaka Moon
2017	"Noche" (Lacrim featuring Damso)	—	26	65	SNEP: Platinum	Lacrim album R.I.P.R.O 3
2017	"113" (Booba featuring Damso)	—	27	38	SNEP: Platinum	Booba album Trône
2018	"Rêves bizarres" (Orelsan featuring Damso)	1	—	15	SNEP: Platinum	Orelsan album La fête est finie - Épilogue
2019	"RVRE" (404Billy featuring Damso)	—	101	—		404Billy album Process
2019	"Tricheur" (Nekfeu featuring Damso)	1	1	12	BEA: Gold; SNEP: Diamond	Nekfeu album Les Étoiles vagabondes
2019	"ParoVie" (D.A.V featuring Damso)	—	130	—		TBA
2019	"God Bless" (Hamza featuring Damso)	10	8	75	SNEP: Diamond	Hamza album Santa Sauce 2
2020	"Promo" (Ninho featuring Damso)	—	2	35	SNEP: Diamond	Ninho album M.I.L.S 3
2021	"Du mal à te dire" (Dinos featuring Damso)	16	—	—	SNEP: Platinum	Dinos album Stamina,
2021	"R9R-Line" (Laylow featuring Damso)	4	25	55		Laylow album L'étrange histoire de Mr. Anderson
2021	"Démons" (Angèle featuring Damso)	2	5	31	BEA: 2× Platinum; SNEP: Diamond	Angèle album Nonante-cinq,
2022	"Dégaine" (Aya Nakamura featuring Damso)	15	1	—	SNEP: Diamond	Aya Nakamura album DNK
2022	"Recontre" (Disiz featuring Damso)	11	1	—	BEA: Gold	Disiz album L'Amour
2023	"Nocif" (Hamza featuring Damso)	2	1	14	SNEP: Diamond	Sincèrement
2023	"Coeur de ice" (Zola featuring Damso)	2	—	—		Diamant du Bled
2024	"Pyramide" (Werenoi featuring Damso)	3	1	—		Pyramide

*Did not appear in the official Belgian Ultratop 50 charts, but rather in the bubbling under Ultratip charts.

=== Other charted or certified songs ===
Year	Title	Charts			Certifications	Album
Year	Title	BEL (Wa)	FRA	SWI	Certifications	Album
2016	"Débrouillard"	—	—	—	SNEP: Gold	Batterie faible
2016	"Périscope"	35 (Ultratip)	—	—	SNEP: Platinum	Batterie faible
2016	"Autotune"	—	—	—	SNEP: Diamond	Batterie faible
2016	"Graine de sablier"	—	—	—	SNEP: Platinum	Batterie faible
2016	"QuedelaVie"	—	—	—	SNEP: Gold	Batterie faible
2017	"Θ. Macarena"	5	3	45	BEA: 3× Platinum; SNEP: Diamond	Ipséité
2017	"Β. #Quedusaalvie"	—	5	—	SNEP: Platinum	Ipséité
2017	"Ν. J Respect R"	—	11	—	SNEP: Diamond	Ipséité
2017	"Ε. Signaler"	—	7	62	SNEP: Diamond	Ipséité
2017	"Γ. Mosaïque solitaire"	—	6	—	SNEP: Diamond	Ipséité
2017	"Ζ. Kiétu"	—	8	—	SNEP: Platinum	Ipséité
2017	"Δ. Dieu ne ment jamais"	—	9	—	SNEP: Platinum	Ipséité
2017	"Η. Gova"	—	13	—	SNEP: Platinum	Ipséité
2017	"Κ. Kin la belle"	—	14	—	SNEP: Platinum	Ipséité
2017	"Λ. Lové"	—	15	—	SNEP: Platinum	Ipséité
2017	"Ι. Peur d'être pêre"	—	17	—	SNEP: Gold	Ipséité
2017	"Μ. Noob Saibot"	—	19	—	SNEP: Gold	Ipséité
2017	"Ξ. Une âme pour deux"	—	22	—	SNEP: Gold	Ipséité
2018	"Julien"	5	4	—	SNEP: Platinum	Lithopédion
2018	"Dix leurres"	—	8	—	SNEP: Gold	Lithopédion
2018	"Silence" (feat. Angèle)	—	3	48	SNEP: Diamond	Lithopédion
2018	"Baltringue"	—	7	—	SNEP: Gold	Lithopédion
2018	"Noir meilleur"	—	19	—		Lithopédion
2018	"60 années"	—	5	—	SNEP: Gold	Lithopédion
2018	"Même issue"	—	10	—	SNEP: Gold	Lithopédion
2018	"William"	—	14	—	SNEP: Gold	Lithopédion
2018	"Introduction"	—	11	—	SNEP: Gold	Lithopédion
2018	"Festival de rêves"	—	9	—	SNEP: Gold	Lithopédion
2018	"Perplexe"	—	15	—	SNEP: Gold	Lithopédion
2018	"Au paradis"	—	13	—		Lithopédion
2018	"NMI"	—	17	—		Lithopédion
2018	"Tard la night"	—	23	—	SNEP: Gold	Lithopédion
2018	"Aux paradis"	—	13	—		Lithopédion
2020	"Deux toiles de mer"	—	2	9	SNEP: Diamond	QALF
2020	"Life Life"	—	5	22	SNEP: Gold	QALF
2020	"Coeur en miettes" (feat. Lous and the Yakuza)	—	6	—	SNEP: Platinum	QALF
2020	"Mevtr"	—	7	—		QALF
2020	"911"	—	8	36	SNEP: Gold	QALF
2020	"Sentimental"	—	9	—		QALF
2020	"BPM"	—	10	—		QALF
2020	"D'ja roulé"	—	11	—		QALF
2020	"Pour l'argent"	—	14	—		QALF
2020	"Rose Marthe's Love"	—	15	—		QALF
2020	"Intro" [QALF]	—	16	—	SNEP: Gold	QALF
2020	"Fais ça bien" (feat. Fally Ipupa)	—	17	—		QALF
2020	"Thevie radio" [Interlude]	—	23	—		QALF
2021	"Σ. Morose"	1	1	9	BEA: Platinum	QALF [∞] [Digital]
2021	"Π. Vantablack"	—	3	26	SNEP: Platinum; BEA: Gold	QALF [∞] [Digital]
2021	"Ο. OG"	—	13	—		QALF [∞] [Digital]
2021	"Ρ. Dose"	—	7	—		QALF [∞] [Digital]
2021	"Υ. 2 Diamants"	—	4	35	SNEP: Diamond; BEA: Gold	QALF [∞] [Digital]
2021	"Τ. Chialer" (feat. YG Pablo)	—	8	—		QALF [∞] [Digital]
2021	"Φ. Thevie Radio"	—	10	—		QALF [∞] [Digital]
2021	"Ψ. Passion"	—	12	—	SNEP: Gold	QALF [∞] [Digital]
2021	"Χ. Zwaar"	—	16	—		QALF [∞] [Digital]
2021	"Ω. Vivre un peu"	—	15	—		QALF [∞] [Digital]
2021	"Youvoi"	—	20	—		QALF [∞] [Digital]
2024	"Tout tenter" (with Angèle)	—	7	—		J'ai menti
2024	"Alpha" (featuring Kalash criminel)	—	3	22		J'ai menti
2024	"Laisse-moi tranquille"	—	3	—		J'ai menti
2024	"Schema"	33	7	—		J'ai menti
2024	"Limbisa ngai" (featuring Kalash)	37	9	47		J'ai menti
2024	"Mony" (with Michkavie)	—	16	—		J'ai menti
2024	"Consequences"	—	19	—		J'ai menti
2024	"24h plus tot"	—	24	—		J'ai menti
2024	"La Rue est morte."	—	27	—		J'ai menti
2024	"Damsautiste"	—	37	—		J'ai menti
2025	"Jcvdems"	4	7	—		Bēyāh
2025	"Love Is Blind"	5	5	32		Bēyāh
2025	"Pa Pa Paw" (with Sarah Sey)	4	6	33		Bēyāh
2025	"Magic" (with I.A.)	27	11	—		Bēyāh
2025	"Frére"	—	20	—		Bēyāh
2025	"Qui m'a demandé"	—	21	—		Bēyāh
2025	"Wolof"	—	22	—		Bēyāh
2025	"Vie Olence"	—	23	—		Bēyāh
2025	"T'es mon del"	—	24	—		Bēyāh
2025	"Ya Tengo Sentimientos"	—	27	—		Bēyāh
2025	"Police"	—	41	—		Bēyāh
2025	"Kaki"	—	44	—		Bēyāh
2025	"Fibonacci"	—	50	—		Bēyāh
2025	"Mamil?h"	—	52	—		Bēyāh
