= SDM (rapper) =

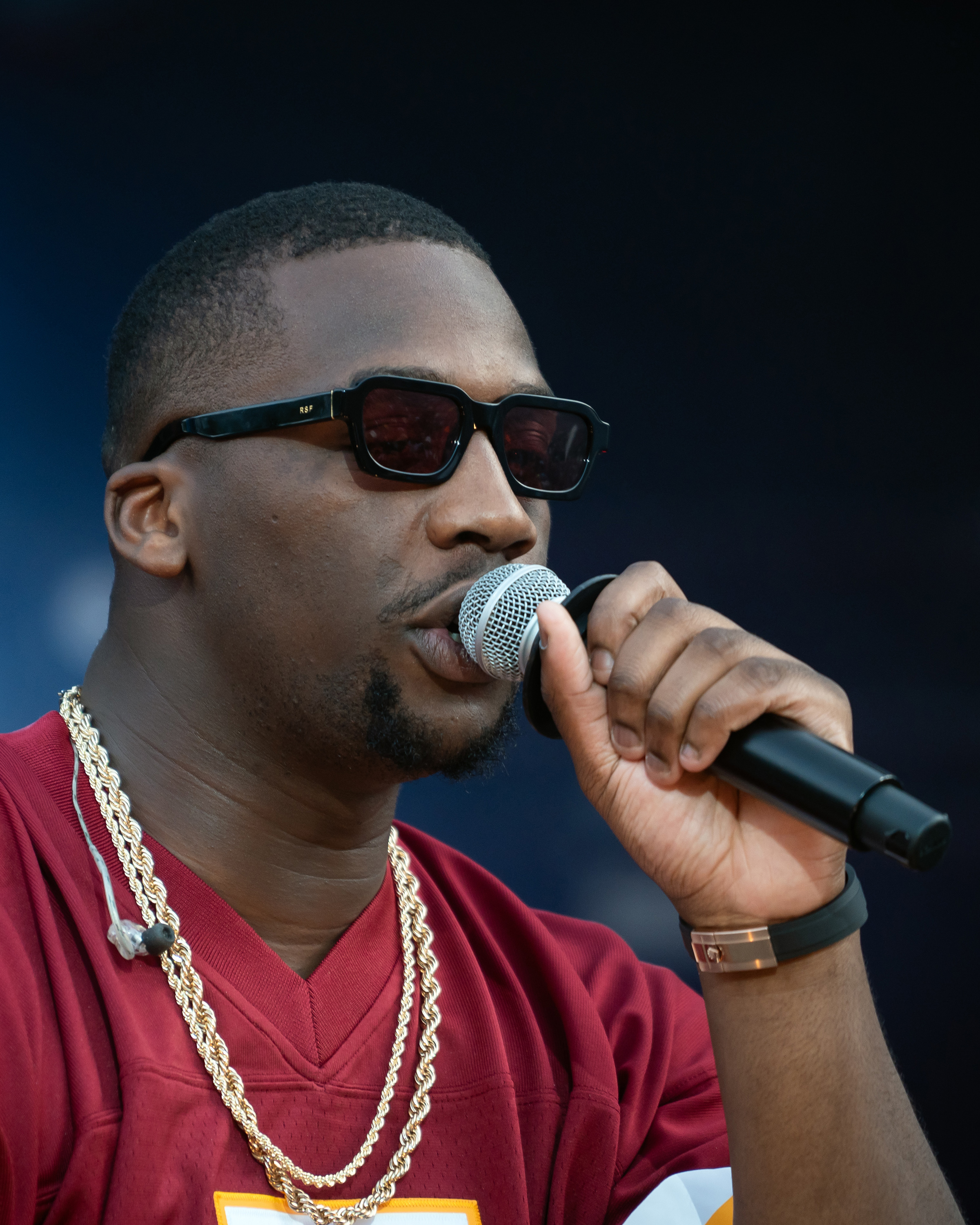

Background information
- Born: Leonard Beni Mosabu; 28 November 1995 (age 30); Meudon, France
- Genres: Hip hop, Gangsta rap, Trap
- Occupation: Rapper
- Years active: 2011–present
- Labels: 92i, 7 Corp, Capitol Records, Universal Music France

SDM, pseudonym of Beni Mosabu (born 28 November 1995 in Meudon), is a French rapper of Congolese descent.

== Biography ==
SDM was born in Meudon, to parents of Congolese descent. He is the youngest of 10 siblings. He spent his adolescence in Clamart.

There are no certainties regarding his civil identity. Most sources (including his label, Universal) identify him as Beni Mosabu, others call him Leonard Beni Mosabu, some talk about Leonard Manzambi. Sometimes Sadam or Saddam is found as a middle name, from which his stage name would derive. In the credits of his songs the names Beni Mosabu and Leonard Manzambi often appear side by side.

His father, with whom he did not grow up, was the producer of musical artist Koffi Olomide, as well as part of the entourage of the Congolese singer Fally Ipupa, while his mother carries out humanitarian aid in Kinshasa. During his childhood he had the opportunity to discover different musical genres, such as afrobeat, Congolese rumba, rhythm and blues and hip-hop, especially rapper 50 Cent.

He was apparently in police custody at the age of 13 for stealing a Domino's Pizza scooter. In the first year of high school he dropped out.

== Career ==
His career as a rapper began in 2011, at the age of 15, with the release of some amateur videos under the pseudonym Sadam Kadafi 92. In some of these videos he rapped with a group of friends, called Microbe Thug'z.

After a few years of break, he returned to making music in 2015, and in 2019 he signed with 432 inc. label. A few months later, he was noticed by rapper Booba, who advertised him on his Instagram profile. Subsequently, he collaborated with PLK on the song Jack Fuego, obtaining his first gold record, and at the beginning of 2020 he signed for 92i, Booba's label, with which he released his song La zone.

On 9 April 2021, his first studio album, entitled Ocho, was made available. It consisted of 18 titles, including featurings with Booba, Bramsito, Fally Ipupa, PLK and Koba LaD. The album was re-released in December in a Deluxe edition with 10 additional tracks, including Passat, featuring Maes, which became SDM's first single to reach the diamond certification.

His second album, Liens du 100, was released on 2 December 2022. It contained 16 tracks and featured artists such as Green Montana, Niska and Tiakola. The title Bolide allemand, taken from the album, achieved considerable success, also thanks to TikTok, proving to be, at the end of 2023, the most streamed song of the year in France on Spotify and Apple Music, as well as the second most listened on Deezer.

His concert at the Olympia in Paris in April 2023 was considered one of the best of the year in France, and featured numerous successful guests such as Leto, Tiakola, PLK, Guy2Bezbar, Koba LaD, Aya Nakamura, Fally Ipupa, Green Montana, Zed, Zkr and Slkrack.

=== Musical style ===
SDM's distinctive trait is his deep and aggressive voice. His songs are characterized by sharp, spontaneous and allegorical lyrics. He also masters the melody very well.

== Discography ==
=== Studio albums ===
- Ocho (2021)
- Liens du 100 (2022)
- À la vie à la mort (2024)
- In Infinitum (2026)

== Awards and nominations ==
=== Berlin Music Video Awards ===
The Berlin Music Video Awards is an international festival that promotes the art of music videos.

Year	Nominated work	Award	Result	Ref.
2025	"Cartier Santos"	Best VFX	Nominated	
