= Tallac Records =

Tallac Records is the label created in 2004 by the French rapper Booba. It is licensed by the record label Barclay Records, a subsidiary of Universal Music Group. Associated labels include 92i Records (since 2015 and many times as an affiliate of AZ/Capitol, Universal, Tallac Records), 7 Corp (since 2018, launched by Booba and managed by Anne Cibron & Capitol Records) and La Piraterie Music (since October 2020, launched by Booba with distribution with Because Music).

== Artists ==
with 92i

The artists signed to the label include:

- Booba
- SDM
- Green Montana
- Bilton
- Elia
- JSX
- Sicario
- Lestin
- Dixon
- KRN
- Dala

with 7 Corp

- Dixon
- Bramsito
- Lestin
- KRN

Artistes Piraterie Musicː

- JSX
- Dala

Former artists

- Nessbeal (2004–2005)
- Sir Doum's (2004–2005)
- Issaka (2004–2006)
- Bram's (2004–2011)
- Mala (2004–2014)
- Djé (2007–2013)
- 40000 Gang (2014–2015)
  - Alox (2014–2015)
  - Elh Kmer (2014–2015)
  - Vesti (2014–2015)
  - Braki (2014–2015)
  - Darki (2014–2018)
  - Benash (2014–2020)
- Shay (2014–2017)
- Damso (2016–2018)
- Siboy (2015–2020)
- Nadjee (2019–2020)

Associations

- Chris Macari, a music video director and producer, closely cooperates with the label.
- Therapy, record producer duo and made up of two individuals known as 2031 and 2093. They operate Therapy Music, a sub-label affiliated with Tallac Records.

The company also has its line of jewelry in association with and produced by Tony Bling, a well–known trademark.
