= Booba =

French rapper and singer (born 1976)

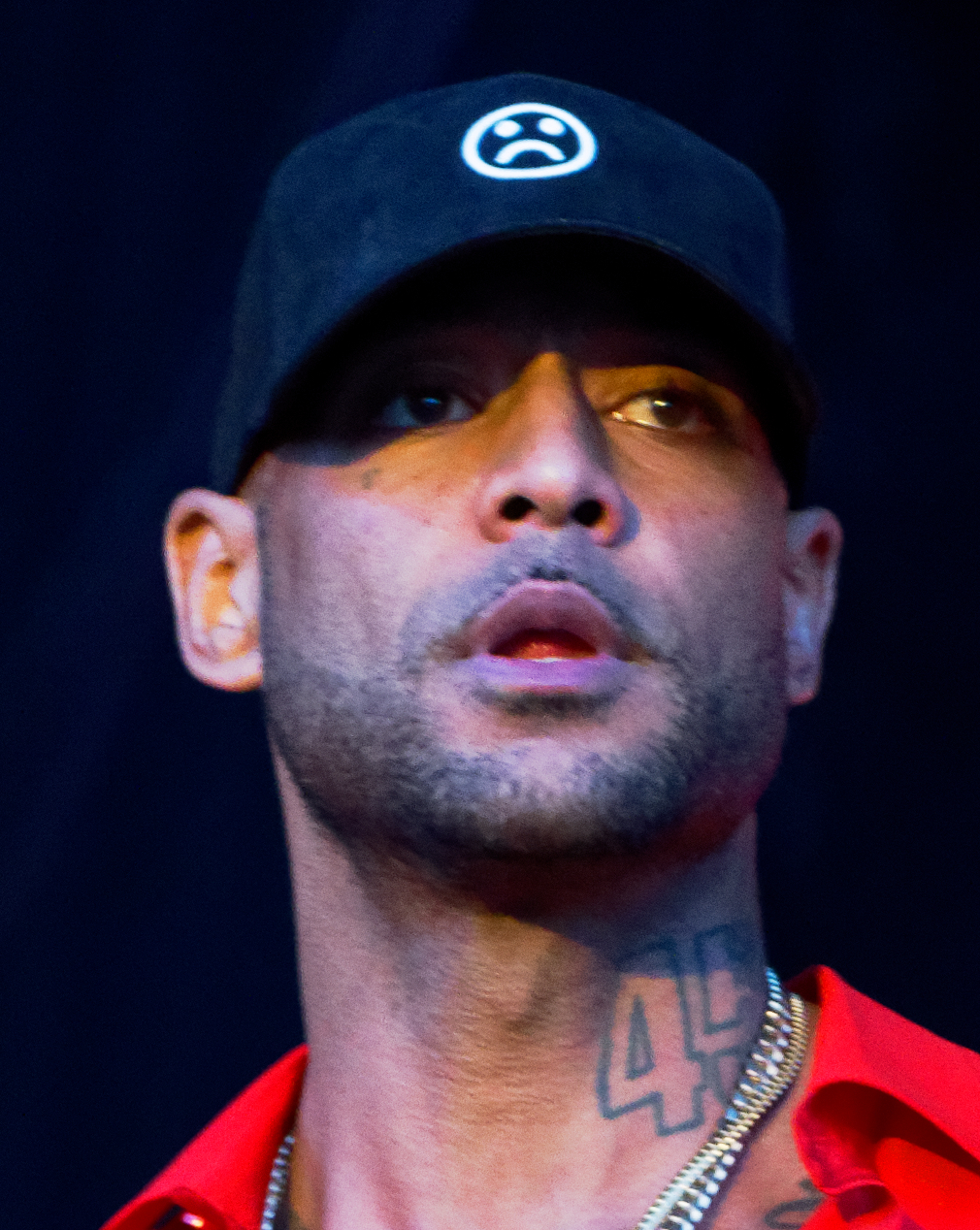
- Booba in 2019 at Vieilles Charrues Festival

Background information
- Also known as: B2OBA; B2O; Kopp; Le Duc de Boulogne (The Duke of Boulogne); Saddam Hauts-de-Seine
- Born: Élie Thitia Yaffa; 9 December 1976 (age 49); Sèvres, Île-de-France, France
- Genres: French rap; gangsta rap; trap
- Occupation: Rapper
- Years active: 1994–present
- Labels: Tallac; Universal; Barclay; Because; 45 Scientific; Musicast l'Autreprod

Élie Thitia Yaffa (French pronunciation: [eli jafa]; born 9 December 1976), better known under his stage name Booba, is a French rapper, singer and entrepreneur. He is considered one of the best and most influential French rappers of all time.

After a brief stint as a break dancer in the early 1990s, Booba partnered with his friend Ali to form Lunatic. The duo released a critically acclaimed album in 2000 but disbanded in 2003. Booba has since embarked on a successful solo career, selling more than 10 million discs over his career and becoming the most downloaded artist (legally) in France. Booba is praised for the quality of his flow and beats but often criticized because of the controversial nature of his lyrics. He has also established the rap label Tallac Records, and developed a line of jewellery.

== Life and career ==
Élie Yaffa was born on 9 December 1976 in the outskirts of Paris in Sèvres. His father is Senegalese and his mother is French of Mosellan and Belgian descent.

With his friend Ali they formed the duo Lunatic in 1994. Unable to secure a record deal from a major label because of their controversial lyrics, they created their own independent record label 45 Scientific in 1999. The following year, Lunatic released its first and only album entitled Mauvais œil.

In 2002, Booba released his debut solo album Temps mort. In 2003, his album Temps Mort was nominated for the Source Hip-Hop Music awards in the International Album of the Year category. He followed this up with four further albums: Panthéon, Ouest Side (the most successful), 0.9 and Lunatic.

In late 2012, he released his sixth solo album Futur. In whole, Booba has ten disks certified, six Disques d'Or (Gold album), three Disques de platine (Platinum album) and one Double disque de platine (Double-Platinum album). In 2011, Booba won the "My Youtube" contest, ahead of popular artists like Rihanna, Justin Bieber, Lady Gaga, Eminem, Jay-Z, Sexion D'Assaut, Shakira, and Stromae.

In 2015 he released two more albums D.U.C. and Nero Nemesis, with a notable hit single 92i Veyron. His album Trône in 2017 received a Disque de Diamant (Diamond disc). with singles such as "Petite Fille" and "Friday".

Several of Booba's songs are considered "classics" of French rap, including "Tallac", "Repose en paix" and "Ma Définition".

== Musical style ==
Booba was influenced by the American hip-hop scene of the late 1980s and early 1990s – Mobb Deep, Wu-Tang Clan, 2Pac, and Biggie Smalls. Dark melodies accompanied with raw lyrics, typical of the rap from New York, are present on every album of his. He is often criticized for being an apologist for easy money and murder. Booba advocates a reduction in the taxes and claims himself in support of individual freedom. Racism is a recurring topic of his songs (see for example "Couleur ébène", "Pitbull", "Ma Couleur"), although he sometimes deliberately advocates communitarian positions.

== Other ventures ==
Booba is also the creator of a streetwear brand, Ünkut, one of the most popular brands of this type in France.

== Discography ==
=== Studio albums ===
- Temps mort (2002)
- Panthéon (2004)
- Ouest Side (2006)
- 0.9 (2008)
- Lunatic (2010)
- Futur (2012)
- Futur 2.0 (reissue) (2013)
- D.U.C (2015)
- Nero Nemesis (2015)
- Trône (2017)
- Ultra (2021)
- Ad vitam æternam (2024)
- Blanco Nemesis (2026)

=== Mixtapes ===
- Autopsie Vol. 1 (2005)
- Autopsie Vol. 2 (2007)
- Autopsie Vol. 3 (2009)
- Autopsie Vol. 4 (2011)
- Autopsie 0 (2017)

== Awards and nominations ==
Award Ceremony	Year	Nominee/Work	Category	Result
Berlin Music Video Awards	2024	6G	Best Cinematography	Nominated
Berlin Music Video Awards	2024	Saga	Best Director	Nominated

== See also ==
- French hip-hop
- List of French singers
