= French hip-hop =

Music style

French hip-hop or French rap (French: rap français [ʁap fʁɑ̃sɛ]), is the hip-hop style developed in French-speaking countries. France is the second largest hip-hop market in the world after the United States.

== History ==
=== Beginning of French hip-hop: 1970s–1980s ===
By 1982 and 1983, a number of hip-hop radio shows had appeared on Paris radio, including "Rapper Dapper" (hosted by Sidney Duteil) and "Funk à Billy" (hosted by DJ Dee Nasty). In November 1982, the New York City Rap Tour traveled around France, featuring Afrika Bambaataa, Grandmixer DST, Fab 5 Freddy, Mr Freeze, and the Rock Steady Crew. When Afrika Bambaataa came to France, he was overwhelmed by the great importance of African culture coming from Africa and the Caribbean.

The first major star of French hip-hop was MC Solaar. Born Claude M'Barali in Dakar, Senegal, he moved as a child to France in 1970 and lived in Villeneuve-Saint-Georges. His 1991 album, Qui sème le vent récolte le tempo, was a major hit. The European Music Office's report on Music in Europe said that the French language was well-suited for rapping. He set many records, including being the first French hip-hop recording artist to go platinum. Some artists claim that the French language hip-hop style was influenced by the music of French singer Renaud.

Following MC Solaar's breakthrough, two broad styles emerged within the French hip-hop scene; artists such as Solaar, Dee Nasty, and Lionel D championed a more mellow, sanguine style, while more hardcore performers such as Assassin and Suprême NTM assumed a more aggressive aesthetic. Many such artists found themselves at the heart of controversies over lyrics that were seen as glorifying the murder of police officers and other crimes, similar to outcries over violent lyrics in American gangsta rap. The cases include Ministère AMER's "Sacrifice de poulet", NTM's "Police" and later Lunatic's "Le crime paie".

=== Influence of American hip-hop ===
French hip-hop, like hip-hop in other countries, is strongly influenced by American hip-hop. Columnist David Brooks wrote that "ghetto life, at least as portrayed in rap videos, now defines for the young, poor and disaffected what it means to be oppressed. Gangsta resistance is the most compelling model for how to rebel against that oppression." He argued that the gangster image of American hip-hop appeals to mostly young and impoverished immigrant minorities in France, as a means to oppose the racism and oppression they experience. Jody Rosen counters Brooks' argument, criticizing that Brooks makes use of only a few, old samples of French gangsta rap that contain violent or misogynistic lyrics, and asserting that Brooks fails to accurately assess French hip-hop's larger scope and discounts its potential for "rappers of amazing skill, style, and wit."

Francophone rap was given a boost in the early 21st century by a decision of the French ministry of culture, which insisted that French-language stations play a minimum of 40 percent of French-language music during transmission. This makes up one quarter of the radio's top 100, ten percent of local music production and has sold hundreds of thousands of CDs. French hip-hop, however, is often criticized for imitating American hip-hop style. French rapper MC Solaar agrees sarcastically, saying, "French rap is pretty much a U.S. branch office... we copy everything, don't we? We don't even take a step back."

=== 1990s–2000s ===
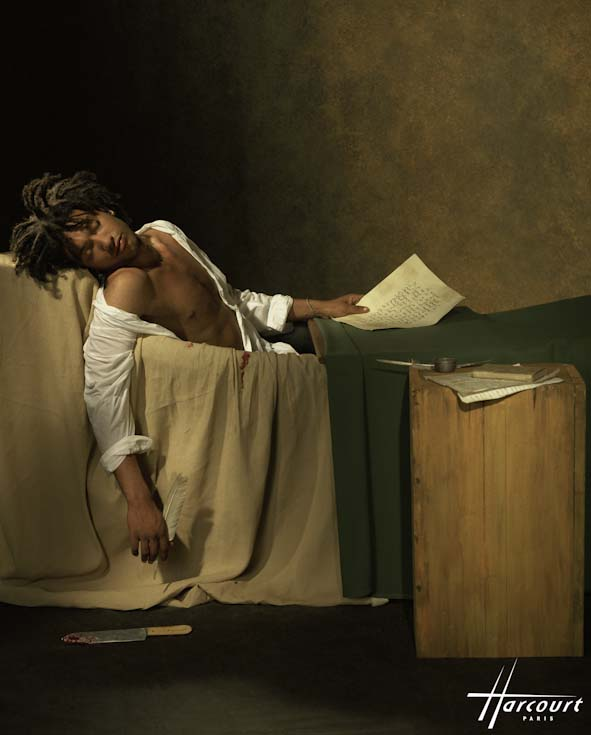
Doc Gynéco in 1997. The photo by Studio Harcourt alludes to the 1793 painting The Death of Marat.

Through the 1990s, the music grew to become one of the most popular genres in France; in 1997, IAM's release "L'école du Micro d'Argent" sold more than 1 million discs, with NTM moving more than 700,000 copies of their final album "Suprême NTM".

As hip-hop moved into a new millennium, French hip-hop artists developed rapidly, seeing commercial success, and even some international appeal. One of the most influential French hip-hop albums of all time, Cinquième As, was released by MC Solaar in 2001. At the same time, new artists like Sinik and Diam's began to see significant success, as well, bringing a new sound and genre of lyrical prowess to the game.

== Themes ==
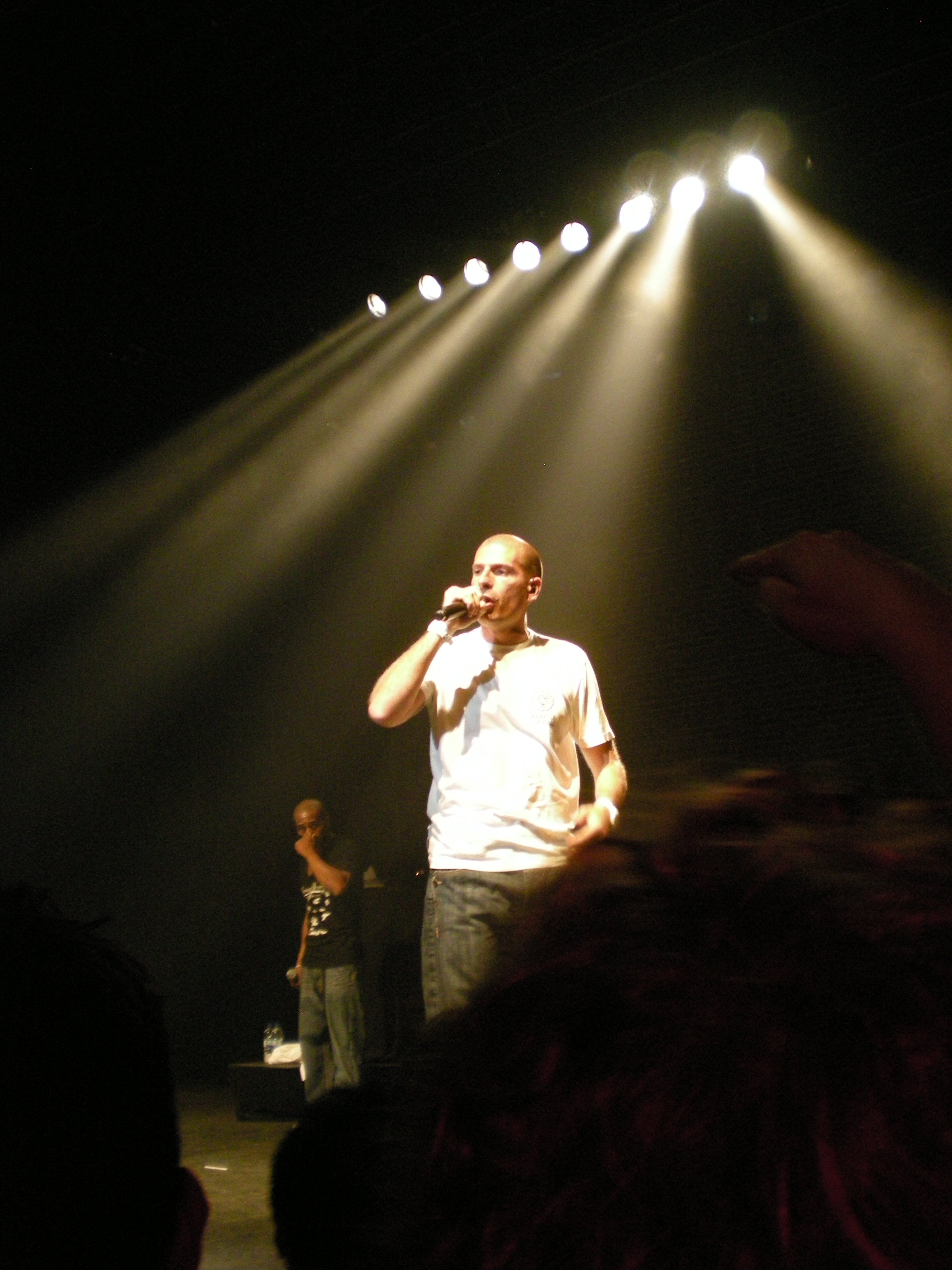
IAM, a prominent group in French hip-hop.

Many of the themes found in French hip-hop deal with societal critique. Artists incorporate humorous, ironic lyrics and adapt cultural elements into their music, such as Soolking who blends traditional Algerian Raï with modern hip-hop. Cultural blending in the genre emerged after a period of influence from American hip-hop elements and aesthetics. Marseille-based band IAM draws from themes and histories rooted the in African continent.

French hip-hop deals with topics surrounding the political and social lives of the immigrant groups living in France. Many French hip-hop artists come from banlieues, low-income suburbs outside of major French cities. Lyrics commonly engage with racial and social discrimination, urban poverty and street life.

French hip-hop has been political in its history as well. Hip-hop in France owes its success to a strong social demand for it. Historically, France adopted a series of hostile policies against immigrant families. For example, a contentious debate is currently being fought out in the political realm as to whether or not Muslim women should be permitted to wear head scarves. Domestic policy in the period since decolonization has resulted in inequalities. Most of these political outcries and demands are coming from the younger generation. Hip-Hop remains a place where young people can express their needs and themselves politically and freely.

The protest at the heart of French hip-hop can be traced directly to the economic boom following World War II. France required manpower to sustain its newly booming industries and the governmental solution was the mass immigration of peoples from regions of past French colonial empire to fill the gaps caused by shortage in personnel. As early as 1945, l'Office national d'immigration (ONI) was formed to supervise the immigration of new workers. Newly arrived Africans were not given the same employment opportunities as their French Caribbean counterparts because they were not citizens and often Africans ended up working as civil servants and menial employees living in dilapidated housing projects. Much of the resistance to social and economic imbalances in French hip-hop relate to this historically unequal situation. Aktivist's song, "Ils ont", includes the lyrics: "Aktivist denounces intolerance to all immigrant fathers/Exploited in France since the 50s-60s/...their bodies are falling apart/And their children are still being judged according to their origins.

== Relationship with Africa and the Caribbean ==
Many French hip-hop artists express strong ties to Africa, though not overtly. Rappers from the 1980s and 90s needed to keep their references to Africa subtle for a few reasons. First, explicitly praising Africa would have been offensive to the many immigrants who fled Algeria and other North African countries because of the economic adversity they faced there, and many rappers probably had parents who had done so. Also, obvious Afrocentrism would have provided the French anti-Maghrebi extreme right with an opportunity to tell Maghrebi immigrants to return to North Africa. And finally, rising conservative Islamism in North Africa would have prevented rappers from being able to imitate their behavior in their native land.

The progress of rap in France is associated with the postcolonial relationships founded with former colonies of Africa and the Caribbean. Therefore, the definition of Africa according to French ideas, and the nature of racism in French society is crucial to understanding the reason for the hip-hop and rap sensation in France. Rappers are overwhelmingly of African descent, and in tackling the issue of their invisibility in French society and declaring their origins, they redefine their identity and defy French notions of ethnicity and citizenship.

Some French hip-hop artists of African origin have used their music to address challenges and issues that cause poverty in African nations. The French hip-hop group Bisso Na Bisso's song "Dans la peau d'un chef" refers to the corruption of African heads of state. Though their music and the issues they cover focus more on their home country, the Republic of the Congo, all members of Bisso Na Bisso live in France and rap in French. Although many artists that have dominated the hip-hop scene in France are of African descent, themes dealing with the intimate connection between France and various African countries tend not to get much promotion on mainstream radio and even less consideration in scholarly research on the subject. While the popularity of nationally grown rap in France grew with the presence of MC Solaar, his involvement in the overall French hip-hop subculture is non-existent, as many consider his work to be in the traditional vein of French pop.

IAM incorporates many African-related themes into its music. Their 1991 song "Les tam-tam de l'Afrique" was one of the first French rap hits to deal explicitly with slavery. This particular track "focused on the plunder of Africa, the abduction of its inhabitants, the Middle Passage, and the plantation system in the Americas." The song includes sample from a Stevie Wonder song, "Pastime Paradise", which, appropriately, touches on race relations and slavery as well. IAM also incorporates images associated with ancient Egypt. Several group members assumed names reflective of this influence. For example, IAM member Eric Mazel goes by the name Kheops, the name of the builder of the Egyptian pyramids.

Many other French hip-hop artists made similar statements through their music, by collaborating to celebrate the 150th anniversary of the abolition of slavery in France in 1998. In order to mark the anniversary of the abolition of slavery in Martinique (which is an overseas department of France in the Caribbean), on May 22, Paris's Olympia theater hosted a concert that opened with "drummers chained together" and featured performances from "rappers of African descent such as Doc Gyneco, Stomy Bugsy, Arsenik, and Hamed Daye."

The African music influences in French hip-hop also extend to the use of African instruments such as the Kora, balafon, and ngoni. Many of the drums played in Africa and the Caribbean music such as "derbuka from North Africa, djembe from Senegal, gwo ka drums from Guadeloupe, bèlè drums from Martinique and Dominica, zouk, bouyon music, etc.). The mixture of the diverse traditional African, Caribbean, and other instrumentals is what produced the French hip-hop and made it distinct.

Today, the Democratic Republic of the Congo and its global diaspora, especially in Belgium and France has brought about some of the largest and fastest growing French-language rap singers. Traditional Congolese music including in the local Lingala language has become popular globally including by artists with Congolese origin such as Tiakola, Dadju, Damso, and GIMS all of which have worked with Congolese singer, Fally Ipupa.

=== French Antilles hip-hop ===
The French Antilles hip-hop is a style of hip-hop originating from the French departments of Guadeloupe and Martinique in the Caribbean. Usually in French and Antillean creole, the French Antilles hip-hop is most popular in the French Antilles and France.

Sidney Duteil (born Patrick Duteil in 1955 in Argenteuil, Val-d'Oise), better known as Sidney, is a French musician, rapper, DJ, television and radio host, and occasional actor of Guadeloupean origin. He is well known in France for his connection with the beginnings of the French hip-hop scene.

== Language ==
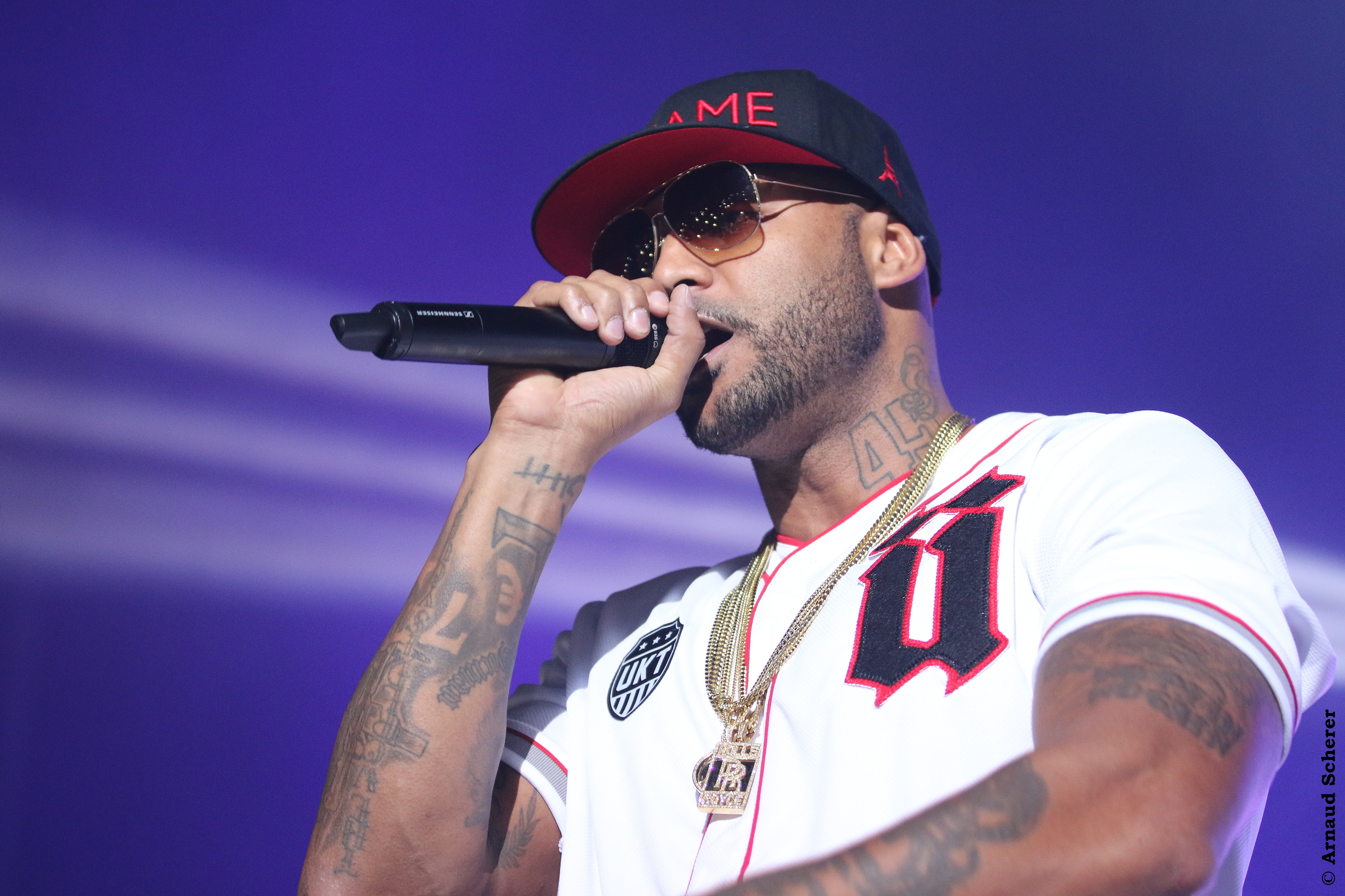
Booba.

Although hip-hop in France has been greatly influenced by American hip-hop culture, the lyrics remain typically in French. Other than English, other language influences are based on oral traditions such as African griots, "talk over" of Jamaica and the blues. French music lyrics typically feature puns, play on words and suggestive phonetic combinations. Such artists as Boby Lapointe often use alliterations, onomatopoeia and puns or double entendre lyrics. The dialect of choice for many hip-hop artists in France is verlan which is based on the inverse of original French words. In some cases artists rap in several different languages on a track including Arabic, French and English. The purpose of the lyrics, no matter the language, is "to popularize and vent the anger and frustrations of many disadvantaged and sometimes mistreated individuals, and to defend the cause of the poorest and least socially integrated segment of French society".

French hip-hop stands out for its "flowing, expressive tones of the language [that] give it a clear identity within the rap world." In many French rap songs, verlan is used, which is a slang that twists words by reversing and recombining them. This makes it difficult for even French-speaking listeners to understand what the MC is saying. Even though it is difficult at times to understand completely the lyrics that are being said rappers still get the heat for causing violence and disturbance within society because of their intense message of rebelling against the system. Commentator Mark Schwartz contends that "poetry and philosophy are greatly esteemed in France, and that they're even more greatly esteemed in French."

Like much of the hip-hop from the United States, many French hip-hop artists use the genre to address pressing social issues. The authors of "Arab Noise and Ramadan Nights: Rai, Rap, and Franco-Maghrebi Identity" state that French rappers rap about "the history of slavery, humanity's origins in Africa, Europe's destruction of African civilizations and the independence struggle led by the Front De Liberation Nationale."

== Breakdancing ==
The break-dancing scene in France is widespread, and some French B-boys are well known for taking part in competitions such as BOTY. Two of the most well-known crews from France are the Vagabonds and the Pockemon, as both of them won the BOTY.
