= Therapy 2093 =

- Occupations: Hip hop producer, composer

Mehdi Mechdal, known as Therapy 2093 or simply Therapy, is a French record producer and beatmaker. In collaboration with other members of Therapy, he has played a notable role in the history of rap in France, particularly by partnering with or launching a number of important rappers, such as Sefyu, Booba, and Dosseh.

However, his most famous collaboration remains with Kaaris for the album Or Noir, which is credited with largely popularizing the musical genre of trap in France. He is considered one of the most influential beatmakers in French rap since the 2010s.

== Biography ==
=== Early life and initial actions ===
Mechdal is the son of a plumber and the nephew of Moho Chemlakh, the former guitarist of Trust. The future producer initially worked as an economics and management teacher in a vocational high school in Seine Saint Denis, a job he maintained even during his artistic career.

=== Career ===
Therapy began his career in 2006 with Sefyu's project Qui suis-je?, which launched the relatively unknown rapper and earned him a gold record. The album is already notable for its avant-garde aspects leaning towards drill and trap, and is considered a classic of French rap. Therapy 2093 continued his career by producing collaborations with Booba, such as Bakel City Gang and Caramel, gradually shifting towards trap with his collaborator, Therapy 2031. The evolution of Therapy during this period was described by Raphaël Da Cruz as follows:

“Booba's Bakel City Gang combines the infernal brass of Atlanta trap with the shrill laser-like synths of electronic music favored by Araab Muzik; Caramel, also by Booba, combines T-Minus-like airy melodies with boiling synths in the style of Mike Will. Therapy 2031 then adopts a tool popularized in production by Lex Luger's work on Waka Flocka Flame's Flockaveli: the arpeggiator, which allows for a series of repetitive, very short notes in the same scale. While he previously extended the notes in his compositions like bell tolls, the Therapy duo developed very short notes, like sonic stings. Those in the track Kalash, the famous Booba and Kaaris collaboration, embody the pinnacle of this aesthetic.”

The beatmaker became close to Kaaris in the early 2010s after being introduced by Booba. In 2012, he produced part of Kaaris' first studio mixtape Z.E.R.O, a significant album in French rap, although it went relatively unnoticed at its release. This album is considered the first trap project in France.

The following year, in September 2013, the duo released Or Noir. This album popularized the genre in France, and Therapy fully embraced these new sounds. The album, very dark and raw, revolutionized French rap and had a lasting impact. It is considered one of the major albums of the decade. By the next year, Therapy was called "the beatmaker for a good part of the French rap intelligentsia" by Libération. In 2014, Therapy collaborated with Niro on Miraculé and with Ateyaba on Ateyaba.

In 2016, Therapy produced for rapper FK, an artist from Normandy. For his contributions to music, he was ranked first among the ten most important French rap producers of the decade by Mouv'. The artistic duo he formed with Kaaris is also considered one of the most accomplished in the field between a rapper and his beatmaker.

In 2021, he collaborated again with Kaaris on Château Noir.

=== Personal life ===
Therapy 2093 is married and has one child.
