= List of number-one hits of 2021 (France) =

This is a list of the French SNEP Top 200 Singles and Top 200 Albums number-ones of 2021.

== Number ones by week ==
=== Singles chart ===
Week	Issue date	Download + Streaming		
Week	Issue date	Artist(s)	Title	Ref.
53	1 January	Jul and SCH	"Mother Fuck"	
1	8 January	Dua Lipa and Angèle	"Fever"	
2	15 January	Dua Lipa and Angèle	"Fever"	
3	22 January	Dua Lipa and Angèle	"Fever"	
4	29 January	Booba	"Ratpi World"	
5	5 February	Booba	"Ratpi World"	
6	12 February	SCH	"Marché noir"	
7	19 February	Dua Lipa and Angèle	"Fever"	
8	26 February	Dua Lipa and Angèle	"Fever"	
9	5 March	Tayc	"Le Temps"	
10	12 March	Booba & JSX	"Mona Lisa"	
11	19 March	Booba & JSX	"Mona Lisa"	
12	26 March	SCH featuring Freeze Corleone	"Mannschaft"	
13	2 April	Moha K	"Vroum Vroum"	
14	9 April	Lil Nas X	"Montero (Call Me by Your Name)"	
15	16 April	Lil Nas X	"Montero (Call Me by Your Name)"	
16	23 April	Lil Nas X	"Montero (Call Me by Your Name)"	
17	30 April	Naps	"La Kiffance"	
18	7 May	Damso	"Σ. Morose"	
19	14 May	Naps	"La Kiffance"	
20	21 May	Naps	"La Kiffance"	
21	28 May	Naps	"La Kiffance"	
22	4 June	Naps	"La Kiffance"	
23	11 June	Soso Maness featuring PLK	"Petrouchka"	
24	18 June	Soso Maness featuring PLK	"Petrouchka"	
25	25 June	Soso Maness featuring PLK	"Petrouchka"	
26	2 July	Soso Maness featuring PLK	"Petrouchka"	
27	9 July	Soso Maness featuring PLK	"Petrouchka"	
28	16 July	Soso Maness featuring PLK	"Petrouchka"	
29	23 July	Naps	"La Kiffance"	
30	30 July	Naps	"La Kiffance"	
31	6 August	Naps	"La Kiffance"	
32	13 August	Naps	"La Kiffance"	
33	20 August	Naps	"La Kiffance"	
34	27 August	Oboy	"TDB"	
35	3 September	Oboy	"TDB"	
36	10 September	Oboy	"TDB"	
37	17 September	Oboy	"TDB"	
38	24 September	Oboy	"TDB"	
39	1 October	CKay	"Love Nwantiti (Ah Ah Ah)"	
40	8 October	CKay	"Love Nwantiti (Ah Ah Ah)"	
41	15 October	CKay	"Love Nwantiti (Ah Ah Ah)" German remix featuring Pronto & Eunique	
42	22 October	CKay	"Love Nwantiti (Ah Ah Ah)"	
43	29 October	Le Classico Organisé	"Loi de la Calle"	
44	5 November	CKay	"Love Nwantiti (Ah Ah Ah)"	
45	12 November	Le Classico Organisé	"Le Classico Organisé"	
46	19 November	Le Classico Organisé	"Le Classico Organisé"	
47	26 November	Orelsan	"L'odeur de l'essence"	
48	3 December	Orelsan	"Jour meilleur"	
49	10 December	Ninho	"Jefe"	
50	17 December	Ninho	"Jefe"	
51	24 December	Ninho	"Jefe"	
52	31 December	Ninho	"Jefe"	

=== Albums chart ===
Week	Issue date	Artist(s)	Album	Ref.
53	1 January	Jul	Loin du monde	
1	8 January	Jul	Loin du monde	
2	15 January	ZKR	Dans les mains	
3	22 January	Mister V	MVP Réédition	
4	29 January	Jul	Loins du monde	
5	5 February	Bénabar	Indocile heureux	
6	12 February	Hamza	140 BPM 2	
7	19 February	Julien Clerc	Terrien	
8	26 February	Elsa Esnoult	5	
9	5 March	Gazo	Drill Fr	
10	12 March	Les Enfoirés	2021: Les Enfoirés à côté de vous	
11	19 March	Les Enfoirés	2021: Les Enfoirés à côté de vous	
12	26 March	SCH	Jvlivs II	
13	2 April	Djadja & Dinaz	Spleen	
14	9 April	Naps	Les mains faites pour l'or	
15	16 April	SCH	Jvlivs II	
16	23 April	47Ter	Légende	
17	30 April	SCH	Jvlivs II	
18	7 May	Damso	Qalf	
19	14 May	Damso	Qalf	
20	21 May	Damso	Qalf	
21	28 May	Sofiane	La Direction	
22	4 June	Maître Gims	Le Fléau	
23	11 June	Soso Maness	Avec le temps	
24	18 June	Clara Luciani	Cœur	
25	25 June	Clara Luciani	Cœur	
26	2 July	Jul	Demain Ça Ira	
27	9 July	Jul	Demain Ça Ira	
28	16 July	Jul	Demain Ça Ira	
29	23 July	Laylow	L'étrange histoire de Mr. Anderson	
30	30 July	Laylow	L'étrange histoire de Mr. Anderson	
31	6 August	Billie Eilish	Happier Than Ever	
32	13 August	Jul	Demain Ça Ira	
33	20 August	Jul	Demain Ça Ira	
34	27 August	Mylène Farmer	Plus grandir	
35	3 September	Kanye West	Donda	
36	10 September	Soprano	Chasseur d'étoiles	
37	17 September	Johnny Hallyday	Johnny Acte II	
38	24 September	Florent Pagny	L'Avenir	
39	1 October	Leto	17%	
40	8 October	Amel Bent	Vivante	
41	15 October	Naps	Best Life	
42	22 October	Coldplay	Music of the Spheres	
43	29 October	Coldplay	Music of the Spheres	
44	5 November	Ed Sheeran	=	
45	12 November	ABBA	Voyage	
46	19 November	Ziak	Akimbo	
47	26 November	Orelsan	Civilisation	
48	3 December	Orelsan	Civilisation	
49	10 December	Ninho	Jefe	
50	17 December	Orelsan	Civilisation	
51	24 December	Adele	30	
52	31 December	Orelsan	Civilisation	

== See also ==
- 2021 in music
- List of number-one singles in France
- List of top 10 singles in 2021 (France)
