= MVP (album) =

Studio album by Mister V
- Released: 31 January 2020
- Genre: French rap, trap
- Length: 54:52
- Language: French
- Label: Hey Pelo Records
- Producer: Mister V (exec.); Alexandra (also exec.); Geronimo Beats; HKey Beats; Binks Beat; DJ Yung Vamp; Pinkman; PLK; Juice; Koz Beatz; Kerion York; Almess; Karmen Rose; Pyroman; Samy Ceezy; Jul; Kezah; Def Starz; Dosseh; KÜBE; Dylan Graham; Limbo; DST; Wladimir Pariente

Mister V chronology
Double V (2017)	MVP (2020)

Singles from MVP
- 1. "Jamais" Released: 4 December 2019

MVP is the second studio album by French rapper and comedian Mister V, released 31 January 2020. The name "MVP" signifies "Most Valuable Panda" according to Mister V; the original term "MVP" means "Most Valuable Player" in sports. A reissue titled MVP (Réédition) was released on 15 January 2021.

== Track listing ==
Credits adapted from the album's track listing on Tidal.

MVP
No.	Title	Writer(s)	Producer(s)	Length
1.	"Clinton"	Mister V; Karmen Rose	V; Rose; Pinkman	2:32
2.	"Jamais" (featuring PLK)	V; Rose; PLK	Geronimo Beats; Rose; PLK	3:14
3.	"Tudo Bem"	V; Koz Beatz	V; Rose; Juice	3:14
4.	"Femme de ménage"	V; Juice	V; Kerion York	3:08
5.	"Vice City"	V; PLK	V; Geronimo Beats; Hkey	3:23
6.	"Vert"	V; Juice	Geronimo Beats	2:55
7.	"Boogie"	V; Geronimo Beats; Rose	V; Rose	2:49
8.	"Lidl"	V; Rose; Juice	V; Almess	2:55
9.	"Titanic"	V	V; Geronimo Beats; Hkey	3:36
10.	"Moulin rouge"	V; Rose	Rose; Pyroman	2:41
11.	"Kungfu"	V; Geronimo Beats	V; Juice; Samy Ceezy	2:50
12.	"Pirelli" (featuring Jul)	V; Rose; Jul	Rose; Kezah	3:34
13.	"Menace"	V; Rose	Def Starz	3:21
14.	"On y est"	V; Rose	Rose; Binks Beat; DJ Yung Vamp; KÜBE	3:20
15.	"Gang" (featuring Dosseh)	V; Rose; Dosseh	Rose; Geronimo Beats	2:49
16.	"Payakaroon"	V; Rose	Rose; Dylan Graham; Limbo	2:43
17.	"Miami Heat"	V; Samy Ceezy	Geronimo Beats	2:34
18.	"Facetime"	V; Rose	Rose; DST; Wladimir Pariente	3:02
Total length:				54:52

MVP (Réédition) additional tracks
No.	Title	Writer(s)	Producer(s)	Length
19.	"G-Wagon"	V; Ceezy	Ozhora Miyagi	2:36
20.	"Le Tour" (featuring Naza)	V; Rose	Rose; DST; Unfazzed	2:53
21.	"Potion"	V; Juice	DR; L$30; M6	2:49
22.	"Tempête" (featuring Laylow)	V; Laylow	Chapo; Heizenberg	4:44
23.	"Vettel"	V; Rose	DeeMad; Neo Maestro	2:47
24.	"Gas" (featuring Gazo)	V; Gazo; Ceezy	Geronimo Beats; Ceezy	3:07
Total length:				73:49

== Charts ==
=== Weekly charts ===
Chart (2020–2021)	Peak position
Belgian Albums (Ultratop Flanders)	37
Belgian Albums (Ultratop Wallonia)	1
French Albums (SNEP)	1
Swiss Albums (Schweizer Hitparade)	4

== Certifications ==
Region	Certification	Certified units/sales
France (SNEP)	2× Platinum	200,000^{‡}
^{‡} Sales+streaming figures based on certification alone.

== See also ==
- List of number-one hits of 2020 (France)
- List of number-one hits of 2021 (France)
