= Qui suis-je? =

Studio album by Sefyu
- Released: May 2006
- Genre: French hip-hop
- Length: 89:26
- Label: Because
- Producer: Therapy Music

Sefyu chronology
| Qui suis-je? (2006) | Suis-je le gardien de mon frère? (2008) |

Qui suis-je? (in English: Who am I?) is the debut studio album by French rapper Sefyu, produced by the label Because Music and the beatmaker Therapy. Released in May 2006 in relative anonymity, it catapulted Sefyu to the forefront of the French rap scene and, more broadly, among French singers, allowing him to win the Victoires de la Musique in 2009. This success was made possible by the highly innovative style of the rapper, which includes numerous onomatopoeias, rhythm breaks, mouth sounds, and combines this technical form with impactful, unsettling, or profound messages about human nature.

The album is considered a classic of French rap. However, despite its innovations, which sometimes place it in the realms of "pre-trap" or "pre-drill", it failed to have a lasting influence on French rap, which later embraced trap music through other avenues, notably Kaaris.

== History ==
=== Context ===
French rap entered a period known as the "crisis of the record industry", with the development of the Internet and illegal music downloads. This crisis affected the entire music production sector in France and was not limited to rap. It drastically reduced the desire of labels to support a rapper like Sefyu, who was very dark, violent, and relatively unknown. Before releasing Qui suis-je?, Sefyu had a career with the group NCC, but he remained relatively obscure. In 2004, he participated in Code 187 with Rohff, Kamelancien, and Alibi Montana, and then in Patate de Forain with Seth Gueko, who was also a "rising star" at that time.

=== Release of the album ===
The album was released in May 2006 after a publicity campaign that played on mystery. Thus, at the time of the album's release, Sefyu concealed his face and did not show it to the public. The title is a reference to Nina Simone's interpretation of "Who am I?".

Within a few weeks, the album ranked 5th among the best-selling albums in France. The album was the first production by Therapy, the future beatmaker for Kaaris. It was also a response to the 2005 French riots. The album sold 75,000 copies and achieved gold certification.

== Impact ==
=== Lexical ===
The album impacted the French language by popularizing various slang expressions that were subsequently shared and spread. One of these expressions that it introduced into the language is the term "boloss".

=== Political ===
Sefyu ventured into the political realm by reflecting on his origins, his history, and the broader history of ethnic minorities in France. He was particularly open to the reflections developed by Nina Simone on the search for origins by African diasporas. However, he diverged from this view by considering such a search futile, advocating instead for the celebration of multiculturalism and the union of peoples.

=== Avant-garde aspects ===
The album is considered a classic of French rap, notably due to its avant-garde aspects in many areas. Sefyu introduced adlibs, numerous onomatopoeias, rhythm breaks, and mouth sounds into his music, elements that would become prominent in French rap more than a decade later. However, despite this innovative approach, the album failed to inspire a generation of rappers who would draw from its codes and be influenced by this work.

== Track listing ==
All tracks are written by Sefyu.

Qui suis-je? track listing
| No. | Title | Length |
|---|---|---|
| 1. | "Intro" | 3:40 |
| 2. | "En Live de la Cave" | 3:47 |
| 3. | "Senegalo Ruskov" | 4:40 |
| 4. | "La Légende" | 5:11 |
| 5. | "Ennemis" | 4:12 |
| 6. | "Bif" | 4:08 |
| 7. | "En Noir et Blanc" | 4:08 |
| 8. | "La Vie qui va avec" | 3:42 |
| 9. | "Bollos" | 3:15 |
| 10. | "Musculation" | 4:16 |
| 11. | "Tu valais pas mieux..." | 3:35 |
| 12. | "Goulags" | 4:27 |
| 13. | "Faits divers" | 5:06 |
| 14. | "Electrochoc" | 3:44 |
| 15. | "Un Point C Tout" | 4:56 |
| 16. | "Pôle Nord" | 4:36 |
| 17. | "Crouille" | 4:52 |
| 18. | "Qui suis-je ?" | 4:55 |
| 19. | "Censure" | 4:29 |
| 20. | "Evolution" | 3:54 |
| 21. | "Mister Coupe Coupe" | 3:53 |
| Total length: | | 89:26 |

== Charts ==
Chart performance for Qui suis-je?
| Chart (2006) | Peak position |
|---|---|
| Belgian Albums (Ultratop Wallonia) | 77 |
| French Albums (SNEP) | 14 |
