= Ateyaba (album) =

Studio album by Joke
- Released: June 2, 2014
- Recorded: 2013 – 2014
- Genre: Hip hop, french rap, trap, Hardcore Rap, Dirty Rap
- Length: 60:08
- Label: Def Jam France
- Producer: Oumar Samaké (exec); Joke; Therapy "2093"; The Beat Freakz; Richie Beatz; Blastar; Ikaz Boi; Jaycee; ID Labs; CashMoney AP; Rytchie Pronzola; Mr. Punisher; Myth Syzer; Hot Track

Joke chronology
Tokyo (2012)	Ateyaba (2014)	Delorean Music (2015)

Singles from Ateyaba
- 1. "Majeur en l'air" Released: March 31, 2014; 2. "Vénus" Released: May 12, 2014; 3. "Miley" Released: May 12, 2014; 4. "Sphinx (feat. Rim K & Seth Gueko)" Released: February 20, 2014; 5. "On est sur les nerfs" Released: June 2, 2014; 6. "Black Card (feat. Pusha T)" Released: June 2, 2014; 7. "Amistad" Released: June 2, 2014

Atebaya is the first studio album by French rapper Joke. It was released on June 2, 2014, by Def Jam France. The album features guest appearances by Jhene Aiko, Pusha T, Dosseh, Seth Gueko, Rim'K, Bip's and Titan.

== Track listing ==
No.	Title	Writer(s)	Producer(s)	Length
1.	"Pharaon"	Gilles Soler	Leknifrug	2:42
2.	"Majeur en l'air"	Soler	Therapy	3:36
3.	"Black Card" (featuring Pusha T)	Soler; Pusha T	Leknifrug; Blastar	2:47
4.	"Menace - Interlude"	Soler	Mr. Punisher	1:01
5.	"Menace"	Soler	Da Beat Freakz	3:12
6.	"Jen Selter"	Soler; Unnamed women	Richie Beatz	4:33
7.	"New Jack City"	Soler	Richie Beatz	3:52
8.	"Miley" (featuring Dosseh)	Soler; Dosseh; Alex Petit	CashMoneyAP	4:00
9.	"On est sur les nerfs"	Soler	Ikaz Boi	3:06
10.	"Venus"	Soler	Hottrack	3:37
11.	"French Riviera" (featuring Jhené Aiko)	Soler; Jhené Aiko	Richie Beatz	4:05
12.	"Casino"	Soler	Still Nas Rise	4:50
13.	"4 Pattes" (featuring Titan)	Soler; Titan	Leknifrug	3:41
14.	"Oyé Sapapaya"	Soler	High Klassified	3:21
15.	"Paris"	Soler; Unknown singer	Soler	5:00
16.	"Ateyaba"	Soler	Da Beat Freakz	4:27
17.	"Niamtougou (Outro)"	Soler	Myth Syzer	3:43
18.	"Anubis" (featuring Bip's)	Soler; Bip's	Blastar	4:36
19.	"Amistad"	Soler	ID Labs	3:50
20.	"Sphinx" (featuring Rim'K & Seth Gueko)	Soler; Rim'K; Seth Gueko	Richie Beatz	3:59
21.	"Diamand & Cigarios"	Soler	Jay Cee	4:36
Total length:				60:08
