= Ciroc (disambiguation) =

Ciroc may refer to:

- Cîroc, a brand of alcoholic beverages
- CIROC, the EPPO code of Cirsium occidentale
- Ciroc Entertainment, an American record label later known as Bad Boy Records
- Ciroc, a track in the album Or Noir
