= Double V (album) =

Studio album by Mister V
- Released: 19 May 2017
- Genre: French rap, trap, pop
- Length: 39:50
- Language: French
- Label: Hey Pelo Records / Musicast
- Producer: Geronimo Beats

Mister V chronology
Double V (2017)	MVP (2020)

Double V is the debut studio album by the French rapper and comedian Mister V, released on 19 May 2017 under the record label "Hey Pelo Records" and "Musicast". After months the Double V went gold in France, eight months later, the album went platinum in France.^{,}

== Track listing ==
The entire album was produced by Geronimo Beats.

Double V
No.	Title	Length
1.	"Top Album"	3:12 Platinum
2.	"Venice"	3:05
3.	"Petit déjeuner"	2:04
4.	"Deutsche Qualität" (featuring Samy Ceezy)	3:29
5.	"Demain"	2:50
6.	"Nightcall"	2:58
7.	"Apollo13" (featuring Juice)	3:26
8.	"Bulletproof"	2:46
9.	"Space Jam" (featuring Hayce Lemsi and Volts Face)	3:37 Gold
10.	"Gville" (featuring Tortoz)	2:54
11.	"Thérapie"	3:11
12.	"Cendrillion"	3:17
13.	"Bonobo" (bonus track)	3:01
Total length:		39:50

== Charts ==
=== Weekly charts ===
Chart (2017)	Peak position
Belgian Albums (Ultratop Wallonia)	2
French Albums (SNEP)	1
Swiss Albums (Schweizer Hitparade)	10

=== Year-end charts ===
Chart (2017)	Position
Belgian Albums (Ultratop Wallonia)	123
French Albums (SNEP)	55

== Certifications ==
Region	Certification	Certified units/sales
France (SNEP)	Platinum	100,000^{‡}
^{‡} Sales+streaming figures based on certification alone.
