= Professeur Punchline =

Studio album by Seth Gueko
- Released: 6 November 2015
- Genre: French rap, hardcore rap
- Label: Believe Recordings, Zdedededex
- Producer: Cody Macfly, DJ Weedim, DN, HD Hitz, Hits Alive, Koudjo, Medeline, Yoroglyphe

Seth Gueko chronology
Bad Cowboy (2013)	Professeur Punchline (2015)

Singles from Professeur Punchline
- 1. "Val d'Oseille" Released: 3 September 2015; 2. "Chintawaz" Released: 21 September 2015; 3. "Delicatessen" Released: 16 October 2015; 4. "Seth Gueko Bar" Released: 30 October 2015; 5. "Homme des neiges" Released: 12 November 2015; 6. "Titi Parisien" Released: 27 November 2015; 7. "Joey Starr RMX" Released: 28 January 2016

Professeur Punchline is the fourth studio album by French rapper Seth Gueko, it was released on November 6, 2015 by Believe Recordings.

== Track list ==
1. "Gros dérapage" (4:00)
2. "Val d'Oseille" (3:55)
3. "Mr. l'agent" (4:36)
4. "Delicatessen" (3:46)
5. "Chintawaz" (feat. Gradur) (3:50)
6. "Seth Gueko Bar" (3:29)
7. "La meuf du moment" (feat. Misa) (3:06)
8. "Chantilly Nutella" (3:26)
9. "Comme on fait" (feat. Lacrim) (3:44)
10. "Les démons de Jésus" (3:16)
11. "Titi Parisien" (4:04)
12. "Homme des neiges" (feat. Niska) (4:03)
13. "Joey Starr RMX" (3:15)
14. "Ça fonctionne" (feat. Alkpote) (4:18)
15. "Gros gamin" (4:02)
16. "Boulette en métal" (feat. Sadek & Joke) (5:03)
17. "Paracétamol" (3:33)

== Charts ==
Chart (2015)	Peak position
Belgian Albums (Ultratop Wallonia)	45
French Albums (SNEP)	12
