= Kenza Farah =

French singer (born 1986)

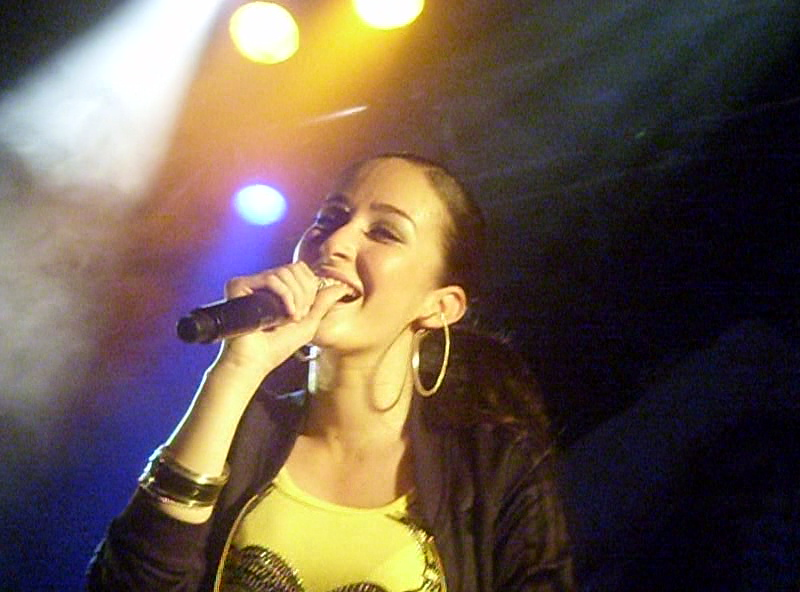
- Farah in 2009

Background information
- Born: 8 July 1986 (age 39); Béjaïa, Algeria
- Genres: R&B; hip hop; soul; pop
- Occupations: Singer; songwriter; rapper
- Years active: 2006–present
- Label: Karismatik
- Website: kenza-farah.fr

Kenza Farah (born 8 July 1986) is a French-Algerian singer. Her album Authentik won gold in its second week. It was followed up by Avec le cœur and Trésor.

== Career ==
Kenza Farah was born on 8 July 1986 in Béjaïa, Algeria and grew up in the 15th arrondissement of Marseille. She has six siblings. At the age of 14, she began playing shows in neighborhoods and won singing contests. Followed by a singing competition, Farah met the producers who allowed her to record some songs in the studio, including "Mon Ange", "Trésor" and "Il ma trahie". She was noticed by the producer Abdel.B, who produced her album from 2006 to 2007 with the independent record label Karismatik.

She is known for her collaborations with many artists such as Sefyu, Le Rat Luciano, Idir, Big Ali, Psy 4 de la Rime, Nina Sky, Roldán of the group Orishas, Busy Signal, Alonzo, Melissa M, Kayline and Nabila (of Karismatik), Soprano, and Ahmed Chawki amongst others.

== Discography ==
=== Albums ===
Year	Single	Charts		Certification	Notes
Year	Single	FRA	BEL (Wa)	Certification	Notes
2007	Authentik	5	50		
2008	Avec le cœur	7	59		
2010	Trésor	18	86		
2012	4 Love	13	44		
2014	Karismatik	31	67		
2019	Au clair de ma plume	44	186		

=== Singles ===
Year	Single	Charts		Certification	Album
Year	Single	FRA	BEL (Wa)	Certification	Album
2007	"Je me bats" / "Appelez-moi Kenza"	11	–		Authentik
2008	"J'essaie encore"	14	–		Avec le cœur
2008	"Au cœur de la rue"	–	19 (Ultratip)		Avec le cœur
2010	"Là où tu vas"	11	–		Trésor
2012	"Quelque part"	64	15 (Ultratip)		4 Love
2012	"Coup de cœur" (feat. Soprano)	16	21 (Ultratip)		4 Love
2013	"Obsesión" (Tropical Family) (with Lucenzo)	16	7 (Ultratip)		Tropical Family
2014	"Yätayö"	190			Karismatik
2014	"Problèmes" (feat. Jul)	55			Karismatik
2016	"Fais le job"	122			TBA
2016	"Mon ange 2.0"	159			TBA
2018	"Photos"				TBA

Featured in

Year	Single	Charts		Certification	Album
Year	Single	FRA	BEL (Wa)	Certification	Album
2013	"Habibi I Love You" (Ahmed Chawki featuring Pitbull & Kenza Farah)	153	–		Non-album release
2015	"Liées" (Ridsa featuring Kenza Farah)	81	–		

=== Mixtapes ===
Year	Single	Charts		Certification	Notes
Year	Single	FRA	BEL Wa	Certification	Notes
2007	Authentik Mixtape	82	–		
