= Z.E.R.O =

Mixtape by Kaaris
- Released: May 2012
- Genre: Hip hop; trap
- Length: 45:56
- Label: AM7 Music
- Producer: Therapy 2093

Kaaris chronology
43eme Bima (2007)	Z.E.R.O (2012)	Or Noir (2013)

Z.E.R.O is a street CD and mixtape by the rapper Kaaris. Released in May 2012 and produced by Therapy 2093, eighteen months before Or Noir, it is a project that already features many elements characteristic of Kaaris's later music. The work holds significant influence in Francophone rap, standing as a frontrunner in the arrival of the trap music genre in France.

== Analysis ==
=== Musical impact ===
The work, which marks Kaaris's first attempt to delve into trap music, innovates in many aspects. The production by Therapy 2093 is particularly noted for its avant-gardism. The album is very raw and designed to shock; for example, Kaaris declares: "Hurry up and suck me, my tip is dried out". Yet, he also references Marcus Aurelius and displays a calmer lyricism, as in "Africa is a billion Jesuses on crosses". The track Lourd Lourd is said to have "one of the most spectacular intros ever seen in a French rap song, embodying the two facets of Kaaris's writing: on one side, very brutal punchlines; on the other, more sophisticated and reflective lyrics".

=== Legacy ===
With this release, Kaaris is said to have been democratized within the Francophone rap scene for the first time. In 2018, Vice described it as an "essential prequel" to Or Noir. The album is also referred to as a "monument" of Francophone rap by Mouv'.

== Track listing ==
Z.E.R.O track listing
No.	Title	Length
1.	"Intro: Ram Muay"	1:27
2.	"Houdini"	3:56
3.	"L'hôte funeste"	3:26
4.	"Bon qu'à ça"	4:34
5.	"L'oeil du mur"	3:42
6.	"Lourd lourd"	4:12
7.	"Criminelle League"	5:02
8.	"Le légiste"	5:22
9.	"Cayman"	4:13
10.	"Hémophiles"	3:56
11.	"Un caillou sur la langue"	3:01
12.	"Super Nova"	3:05
Total length:		45:56

== Charts ==
Chart performance for Z.E.R.O
Chart (2012)	Peak position
French Albums (SNEP)	141
