= Côte Ouest =

Single by 47Ter
- Released: June 25, 2019
- Recorded: 2019
- Genre: Country rap; country pop; surf music; synth-pop; hip-hop
- Length: 3:54
- Label: Entrecôte; Sony Music France
- Songwriter: Pierre Delamotte
- Producers: Blaise Ligouzat; Tristan Salvati; Miguel Lopes

Music video
- Côte Ouest on YouTube

"Côte Ouest" is a song by French hip hop band 47Ter, released on June 25, 2019 from her EP L'adresse.

== Music video ==
As of February 2023, the music video for Côte Ouest had over 7 million views on YouTube.

== Charts ==
Chart (2019)	Peak position
Belgium (Ultratop 50 Wallonia)	42
France (SNEP)	11

=== Certifications ===
Region	Certification	Certified units/sales
France (SNEP)	Platinum	200,000^{‡}
^{‡} Sales+streaming figures based on certification alone.
