= Dominique Alderweireld =

French procurer (1949–2026)

- Born: 5 February 1949; Annœullin, France
- Died: 25 August 2026 (aged 77); Tournai, Belgium
- Occupation: Procurer

Dominique Alderweireld (French pronunciation: [dominˈik ˈɔːldəwˌi͡əɹɛld]; 5 February 1949 – 25 August 2026) was a French procurer. He also went by the name Dodo la Saumure. He was detained from 2011 until 2015 when he was acquited for his procurer activities, however was subsequently arrested again in 2017 on human trafficking charges.

== Early life ==
Born in Annœullin on 5 February 1949, Alderweireld was the father of three children. He attended Jesuit school in his youth and spoke of a difficult childhood, even admitting to committing burglaries.

== Procurer activities ==
Initially a real estate agent for Félix Houphouët-Boigny, he began running brothels in Belgium. He took on the name "Dodo la Saumure", an ode to a 19th century pimp who notably had Amélie Élie in his ring. By 2011, he had 16 brothels under his management, though the number dwindled to five by 2014.

=== Legal issues and detention ===
Alderweireld was detained at Ypres prison on 1 October 2011. He and his partner, Béatrice Legrain, were sentenced to five years in prison by a court in Tournai for procurement from 2000 to 2009. The sentence also entailed the confiscation of all proceeds received from these activities, totaling €2.77 million. During an appeal in April 2013, he argued that authorities had always taken leniency on his activities, citing a report by Committee P. However, the Mons court denied this appeal. In January 2015, he was charged in the Affaire du Carlton de Lille along with Dominique Strauss-Kahn, for his role in the organization of sex parties. However, he was acquitted on 12 June 2015. In July 2017, he was arrested on charges of human trafficking.

=== Media appearances ===
In December 2012, Alderweireld appeared on a segment of France 3 show Ce soir (ou jamais !), which drew criticism from feminist groups and resulted in complaints submitted to the Conseil supérieur de l'audiovisuel. The show's host, Frédéric Taddeï, received an official reprimand. On 23 May 2013, he appeared on the D8 show Touche pas à mon poste!. That same year, rapper Seth Gueko released an album which included a song titled "Dodo la Saumure".

== Later life ==
On 23 June 2026, he announced that he had been evicted from his home and was homeless, issuing a plea for help.

Alderweireld died in Tournai on 25 August 2026, at the age of 77.
