= Avec le cœur =

Studio album by Kenza Farah
- Released: 17 November 2008
- Genre: Rap
- Label: Karismatik
- Producer: Abdel Karismatik

Kenza Farah chronology
Authentik (2007)	Avec le cœur (2008)	Trésor (2010)

Singles from Avec le coeur
- 1. "Au cœur de la rue" 2. "J'essaie encore" 3. "Celle qu'il te faut" 4. "Je représente" 5. "Désillusion du ghetto"

Avec le cœur is a R&B, hip hop and soul French double album, written and performed by French-Algerian singer Kenza Farah. The album, her second studio album, contains 22 tracks and guest appearances with the Psy 4 De La Rime, Nina Sky, Roldan group Orishas and Busy Signal. It was released 17 November 2008 in France.

== Track listing ==
CD1

1. "Avec le cœur"
2. "Au cœur de la rue"
3. "Mi corazon"
4. "Peuple du monde entier"
5. "Je représente"
6. "Désillusion du ghetto"
7. "On tient le coup" feat. Psy 4 de la Rime
8. "Let Me Be With You"
9. "La nuit" feat. Busy Signal
10. "Ce que je suis"
11. "Que serais-je?"

CD2

1. "Kenza sur le beat"
2. "J'essaie encore"
3. "J'aurais voulu te dire"
4. "Chant libre"
5. "Ne nous jugez pas" feat. Roldán
6. "Commandement du ciment"
7. "Toute seule"
8. "Tout ça ne compte pas"
9. "Celle qu'il te faut" feat. Nina Sky
10. "La vérité"
11. "Pardonnez moi"

== Charts ==
=== Weekly charts ===
Chart (2008)	Peak position
Belgian Albums (Ultratop Wallonia)	59
French Albums (SNEP)	7

=== Year-end charts ===
Chart (2008)	Position
French Albums (SNEP)	94
