= Le bruit de mon âme =

Studio album by Kaaris
- Released: 30 March 2015
- Recorded: 2014–2015
- Genre: French rap
- Label: Def Jam France, Therapy Music
- Producer: Therapy 2093

Kaaris chronology
Or Noir Part II (2014)	Le bruit de mon âme (2015)	Double Fuck (2015)

Singles from Le bruit de mon âme
- 1. "Se-vrak" Released: 2014; 2. "Comme Gucci Mane" Released: 2014; 3. "80 ZETREI" Released: 2014; 4. "Magnum" Released: 2015; 5. "Le bruit de mon âme" Released: 2015; 6. "Crystal" Released: 2015

Le bruit de mon âme (pronounced [lə bʁɥi d(ə) mɔ̃n‿ɑm]; literally "The Noise of My Soul") is the second studio album by French rapper Kaaris, it was released on 30 March 2015 by Therapy Music and Def Jam France.

== Track list ==
1. "Kadirov" (3:07)
2. "Se-vrak" (4:14)
3. "Four" (3:53)
4. "80 ZETREI" (4:05)
5. "El Chapo" (feat. Lacrim) (5:12)
6. "Zone de transit" (3:45)
7. "Trap" (3:53)
8. "Crystal" (feat. Future) (4:53)
9. "Tripoli" (4:16)
10. "Magnum" (5:05)
11. "Vie sauvage" (feat. 13 Block) (5:14)
12. "Le bruit de mon âme" (4:54)
13. "Les oiseaux" (5:03)
14. "Mentalité cailleras" (4:20)
15. "Comme Gucci Mane" (4:09)
16. "Voyageur" (feat. Blacko) (3:00)
17. "Situation" (feat. Ixzo & Solo le Mythe) (5:09)
18. "Le temps" (3:37)

== Charts ==
=== Weekly charts ===
Chart (2015)	Peak position
Belgian Albums (Ultratop Flanders)	188
Belgian Albums (Ultratop Wallonia)	14
French Albums (SNEP)	4
Swiss Albums (Schweizer Hitparade)	22

=== Year-end charts ===
Chart (2015)	Position
Belgian Albums (Ultratop Wallonia)	170
French Albums (SNEP)	112
