= 250 (song) =

Single by PLK

from the album Polak
- Released: September 10, 2018
- Recorded: 2018
- Genre: Hip-Hop, Rap
- Length: 2:25
- Songwriter(s): Mathieu Pruski
- Producer(s): PLK

PLK singles chronology
"Dis moi-oui" (2018)	"250" (2018)	"Problèmes" (2019)

Music video
- "250" on YouTube

250 is a song by Polish-French rapper PLK from the album Polak.

== Music video ==
The song was recorded in 2018 and released on September 10, 2018 on YouTube.

== Charts ==
Chart (2018)	Peak position
France (SNEP)	89
