= Authentik (Kenza Farah album) =

Studio album by Kenza Farah
- Released: June 11, 2007
- Genre: Rap
- Label: Karismatik
- Producer: Abdel Karismatik

Kenza Farah chronology
Authentik (2007)	Avec le coeur (2008)

Singles from Authentik
- 1. "Je me bats" 2. "Appelez-moi Kenza"; 3. "Lettre du front"

Authentik is a R&B, hip hop and soul French album, written and performed by French-Algerian singer Kenza Farah. The album, her debut studio album contains 18 tracks (including two on the reissue) and guest appearances with Sefyu, Le Rat Luciano, Idir, Big Ali and The Silence of the Mosques. It was released June 11, 2007 in France. Authentik has been certified gold in France.

== Track listing ==
1. "Dans mon monde"
2. "Je me bats"
3. "Moi j'ai 20 ans"
4. "Ou va le monde"
5. "Lettre du front" feat. Sefyu
6. "Il m'a trahie"
7. "Dans les rues de ma ville"
8. "Trop d'flow" feat. Big Ali
9. "Mi amor"
10. "Ne me dites pas"
11. "Appelez moi Kenza"
12. "Sur tous les chemins" feat. Le Rat Luciano
13. "Sous le ciel de Marseille" feat. Idir
14. "Toi et moi"
15. "Cris de Bosnie" feat. Le Silence des Mosquées
16. "Les enfants du ghetto"
17. "Bye Bye"
18. "Leve la tête""

== Authentik Mixtape ==
=== Track listing ===
1. "Intro Dj Roc j"
2. "15éme Hardcore" feat G.a.p/Soosol
3. "Faut il que je sois?"
4. "Freestyle Skyrock"
5. "Trésor"
6. "Terre à terre" feat Kamelancien
7. "Je reprends mes ailes"
8. "Quoi qu'il arrive" feat Tino/Section fidjo
9. "L'Amour ou la Passion"
10. "Tu reconnais" feat Kayline & Moh/S.krim
11. "Plus rien sans toi' feat T-north
12. "On vous aime tant" feat Alonzo & Ligne 26 & Sale équipe
13. "Freestyle Skyrock"
14. "Il m'a trahie" + Medley ("L'Amour s'en va", "D'Amour ou d'amitié..")
15. "Seule sans toi"
16. "Nos différences"
17. "Face à la mort" feat Bouda/15eme Processus
18. "Flashback" feat K-RhYme le roi
19. "À la place d'un ange" feat Monock/La Méthode
20. "Toi et moi" feat Mickey-lansky)

== Charts ==
Authentik

Chart (2007)	Peak position	Weeks in chart
Belgium Albums Chart (Walloon)	50	20
French Albums Chart	5	70

Authetik Mixtape

Chart (2007)	Peak position	Weeks in chart
French Albums Chart	82	5
