= Double Fuck (mixtape) =

Mixtape by Kaaris
- Released: 16 October 2015
- Recorded: 2015
- Genre: French rap, Trap
- Label: Therapy Music / Def Jam France
- Producer: Therapy (Loxon & Phantomm); 240 Prod

Kaaris chronology
Le bruit de mon âme (2015)	Double Fuck (2015)	Okou Gnakouri (2016)

Singles from Double Fuck
- 1. "Terrain" Released: 21 May 2015; 2. "C'est la base" Released: 2 October 2015; 3. "Sinaloa" Released: 19 October 2015

Double Fuck is a mixtape make by French rapper Kaaris. It was released on 16 October 2015 by Therapy Music and Def Jam France.

== Track list ==
1. "Sinaloa" (3:39)
2. "Terrain" (3:14)
3. "Démarrage Hold-up" (4:30)
4. "Petit vélo" (4:09)
5. "Briller" (4:10)
6. "C'est la base" (feat. XVBARBAR) (6:20)
7. "Talsadoum" (2:43)
8. "Tieks" (3:57)
9. "H" (4:13)
10. "Audemard m'a tué" (3:56)
11. "Gringo" (Bakyl) (3:43)
12. "Où sont les €" (feat. SCH & Worms-T) (5:03)
13. "Finition" (PSO Thug) (3:47)
14. "Recharge" (4:32)
15. "D.K" (4:28)
16. "Double Fuck" (2:58)

== Charts ==
=== Weekly charts ===
Chart (2015)	Peak position
Belgian Albums (Ultratop Wallonia)	7
French Albums (SNEP)	4
Swiss Albums (Schweizer Hitparade)	35

=== Year-end charts ===
Chart (2015)	Position
French Albums (SNEP)	196
