= 47Ter =

French rap trio

47Ter (pronounced Quarante-sept Terre, [kaʁɑ̃t sɛt tɛʁ]) is a French hip hop band from western Paris. The trio is composed of Pierre-Paul, Blaise and Lopes, all of whom come from Bailly.

Before forming 47Ter, Pierre-Paul and Lopes were members of a rock group known as Fresh Octopus, now defunct. After posting their videos on YouTube between 2017 and 2018, including remakes of songs such as On vient gâcher tes classiques, the trio released their debut EP (extended play) entitled Petits Princes in 2018. They followed this up with the release of an 11-track freestyle recording offered online. On 18 February 2018, the group had their first live invite on the radio for new talents called "On en parle.." on Radio Sensations.

In 2019, 47Ter released their studio album titled L'adresse, an album with mixed rap and pop music. The trio was scheduled to perform at Las Cigale, Olympia and at the Solidays Festival, but all were cancelled because of the COVID-19 pandemic.

The group released their second album titled Légende on 16 April 2021 and are currently preparing for their debut concert tour titled the Légende Tour, which is set to begin on 12 February 2022 in Amneville, and will make stops in cities around France and Europe.

== Discography ==
=== Albums ===
Title	Year	Peak chart positions		
Title	Year	FRA	BEL (Wa)	SWI
L'adresse	2019	12	26	—
Légende	2021	1	23	47
Au bon endroit	2023	6	109	—

=== EPs and other releases ===
Title	Year	Peak chart positions	
Title	Year	FRA	BEL (Wa)
Petits princes	2018	173	—
On vient gâcher tes classiques	2019	109	92

=== Singles ===
Title	Year	Peak chart positions		Album / EP / Mixtape
Title	Year	FRA	BEL (Wa)	Album / EP / Mixtape
"Journée de perdue"	2018	—	19 (Ultratip)	
"Côte Ouest"	2019	11	42	
"Vivre"	2020	76	4 (Ultratip)	Légende

=== Other songs ===
Title	Year	Peak chart positions		Album / EP / Mixtape
Title	Year	FRA	BEL (Wa)	Album / EP / Mixtape
"L'adresse"	2019	95	—	L'adresse
"Soleil noir"	2019	198	—	L'adresse
"On avait dit"	2020	71	6	
"J'essaie"	2020	108	—	Légende
"Avec toi"	2020	141	—	Légende
