= Hayce Lemsi =

French rapper of Algerian descent

Islam Belouizdad (born in Hassi Messaoud, Algeria on 16 December 1987) better known as Hayce Lemsi is an Algerian-French rapper and singer. He has also used the stage names L'insomniak, La Kalash Humaine, Big Lemsi and Biko Loco.

He started his career in 2008 presenting his freestyle online and on radio. He released his debut mixtape Un petit pas pour Lemsi in 2012 followed by his breakout mixtape Électron libre in 2013. In 2015 he released his debut studio album titled L'or des rois on Capitol Records. In 2017 he released his mixtape Électron libre 2 as a follow-up to Électron libre. He also has a joint album À des années lumières in collaboration with his biological brother Volts Face.

In 2015, he launches his own independent music label Triangle d'or, later renamed in Big Lemsi Record.

== Biography ==
Hayce Lemsi was born in Hassi Messaoud, a town of 40,000 inhabitants located in the Algerian Sahara. His date of birth diverges according to the sources, most of them determining 16 December, 1987. Then his family moved to the 17th arrondissement of Paris.

Hayce Lemsi is a big fan of Eminem, whose career inspired him to start his own. He started his career in 2008 and started being recognised thanks to his freestyles from 2009. On 25 June, 2012, he released his first project, under the label Nord Island, a mixtape named Un petit pas pour Lemsi. Then he was invited by Alkpote (French rapper) on the project Mazter Chefs Musik Vol. 1, for the track Pas facile featuring Zekwe. On November 4, 2013, Hayce Lemsi released his second project and mixtape, entitled Électron libre, with the participation of Soprano and Lacrim, both French rappers. The project was ranked at number 10 on the French charts, and best sales of the week on the iTunes platform.

On 30 January, 2015, he published Pyramide as the first extract of his first studio album, whose name is revealed in his 2015 medley, L’or des rois. Its release date is scheduled on 4 September, 2015. On 13 May, 2015, the second extract of the album, Faya, is released. From Monday 31 August to Friday 4 September, 2015 a special week is dedicated to him in the Planète Rap program on the French radio Skyrock for the upcoming release of his album. But on 2 September 2015 Hayce Lemsi was taken into custody. The album was released under his own label, created some time earlier, Triangle d’or, which signed bands and artists from his entourage, such as XV Barbar, and Hayce Lemsi’s brother Volts Face, who is also featuring in his album for the track Walking dead. Maître Gims, a famous Belgian rapper who released his second album a week earlier, is also invited on the album. In December 2015, he revealed his remix of the track Boxe avec les mots, from Ärsenik.

In October 2015, Hayce Lemsi announced his departure from major Universal, to return exclusively as an independent under his Triangle d'or label. In February 2016, he renamed his label Big Lemsi Records. He announced for March 2016 the release of the album À des années lumières, delayed until 8 April 2016, an album in collaboration with his brother Volts Face, a French rapper.

At the end of 2016, Hayce Lemsi signed with the Eleven's Music label and the Pias record company in preparation of his new project Électron libre 2, which will be released a few months later, on 17 February, 2017. This album includes many featurings with Jok'Air, Volts Face and the French singer Lise Auvolat. He played many concerts after the release of his album but was arrested on 28 April 2017, during the day of one of his concerts, when he was exiting a high-speed train (TGV). He is accused of not attending an interview with the sentencing judge who was handling his case. He was set free on 22 October, 2017. On 26 November, 2017 he released the video clip Dimanche Lokos, in which he announced the release date of his next mixtape, Eurêka, which will be released on 8 December, only on digital platforms.

== Discography ==
=== Albums and mixtapes ===
Year	Title	Type	Peak chart positions				Certification
Year	Title	Type	FR	BEL (Fl)	BEL (Wa)	SWI	Certification
2012	Un petit pas pour Lemsi	–	–	–	–	–	
2013	Électron libre	Mixtape	10	192	47	–	
2015	L'or des rois	Album	6	–	14	70	
2016	À des années lumières (with Volts Face)	Joint album	25	–	38	–	
2017	Électron libre 2	Mixtape	17	–	12	–	SNEP: Gold
2017	Eurêka	Album	51	–	66	–	
2018	La haute	Album	71	–	–	–	
2019	Écorché vif	Album	45	–	50	–	
2021	En Attendant Elv3	Album	34	–	–	–	

=== Singles ===
Year	Title	Peak chart positions	Album / Mixtape
Year	Title	FR	Album / Mixtape
2013	"One-One"	97	Électron libre
2015	"Pyramide"	77	L'or des rois
2015	"Faya"	84	L'or des rois
2015	"Millionnaire"	200	L'or des rois
2017	"Mercy"	169	Électron libre 2
2017	"C'est terminé"	175	Électron libre 2

=== Featured in ===
Year	Title	Peak chart positions		Album / Mixtape
Year	Title	FR	SWI	Album / Mixtape
2017	"Space Jam" (Mister V feat. Hayce Lemsi & Volts Face)	27	81	"MVP"

=== Other songs ===
Year	Title	Peak chart positions	Album / Mixtape
Year	Title	FR	Album / Mixtape
2015	"Au cœur de Lutèce" (feat. Maître Gims)	184	L'or des rois
2017	"Le bon chemin" (feat. Volts Face)	118	Électron libre 2
2017	"Je t'aime moi non plus"	141	Électron libre 2
2017	"Havana"	120	Eurêka
2017	"6452"	166	Eurêka
2017	"Pull In Up"	179	Eurêka
2017	"Savastano" (feat. Volts Face)	182	Eurêka
2017	"Electron libérable"	184	Eurêka
