= Ateyaba =

French rapper

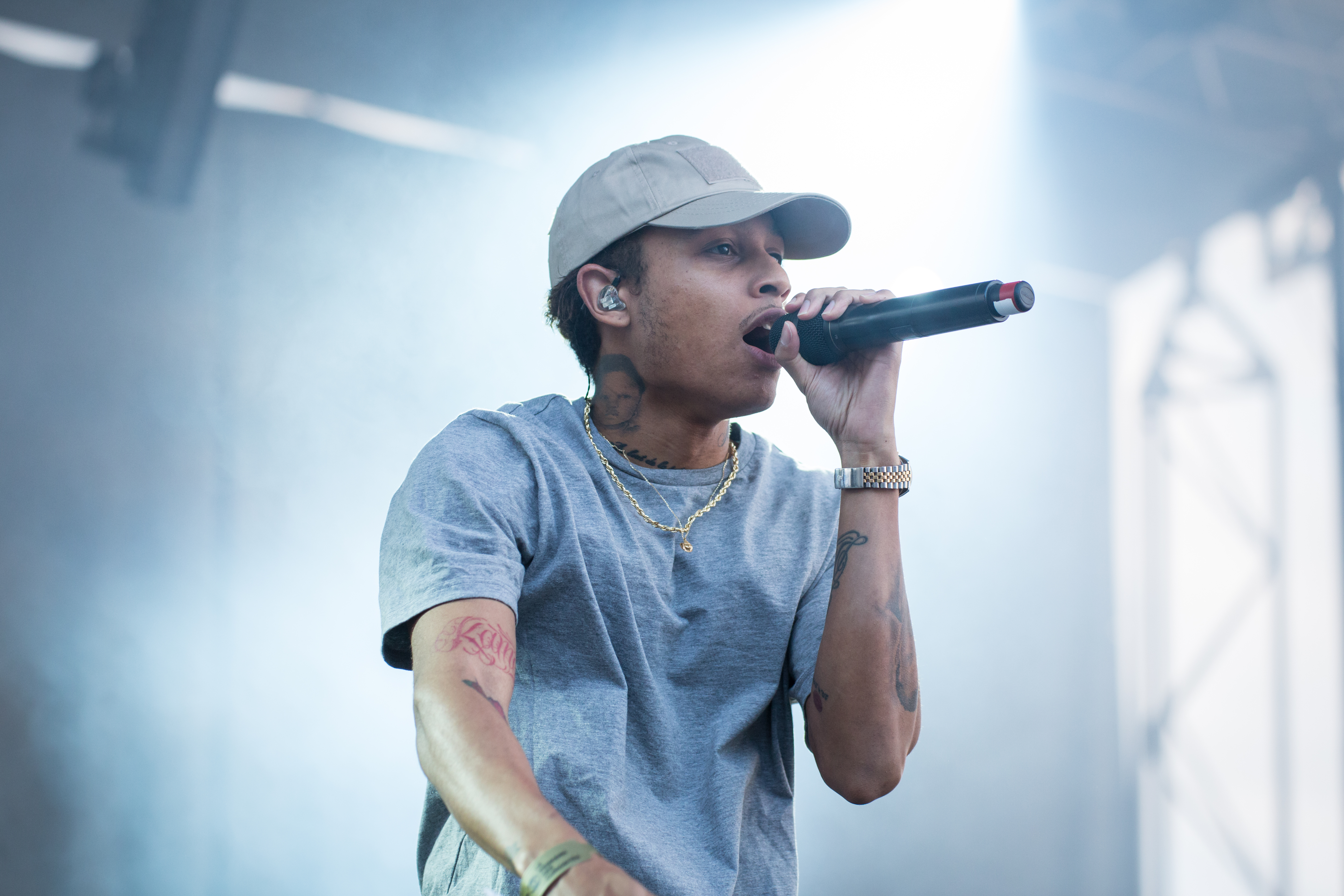
- Joke at WeekEnd des curiosités 2015, Ramonville-Saint-Agne, France

Background information
- Also known as: Joke; Joke MTP; Joky; Jokeezy; Ateyaba-San; Joke 24K
- Born: Gilles Ateyaba Koffi Soler; 27 October 1989 (age 36); Narbonne, Aude, France
- Origin: Montpellier, Hérault
- Genres: French hip hop; alternative hip hop; hardcore hip hop
- Occupation: Rapper
- Years active: 2008–present
- Labels: Def Jam (France); Golden Eye Music Group
- Website: www.jokemtp.com

Gilles Ateyaba Koffi Soler better known as Ateyaba, previously as Joke (born 1989) is a French rapper.

== Early life ==
He was born in Narbonne, France on 27 October 1989 and at age 10 moved to Montpellier.

As an adolescent, he released some materials on Myspace through which he was discovered by Teki Latex (of TTC) and was included in Stunts, the rap division of the label Institubes.

== Career ==
He recorded some materials in Paris that appeared in his mixtape Prêt pour l'argent in August 2009. He left Institubes after the release. He had independent releases, the EP Prêt pour l'argent 1.5 in with the guest appearance of the New York MC, Action Bronson. and EP Kyoto in 2012 and an appearance in Golden Eye Music 2012 compilation We Made It v.1 with the track "MTP Anthem", a tribute to his city Montpellier.

Joke released his third EP Tokyo on 27 May 2013. This project had a big success. The same year, he was signed to Def Jam France, part of Universal Music

His debut album Ateyaba was released on 2 June 2014 with a number of tracks from the album charting on the SNEP Singles Chart. On this project, Joke worked with major artists like Jhené Aiko, Dosseh and Pusha T.

In 2015, Joke released his fourth EP, Delorean Music.

== Discography ==
=== Albums ===
Year	Album	Credit	Peak positions		Certification
Year	Album	Credit	FRA	BEL (Wa)	Certification
2014	Ateyaba	Joke	5	31	
2023	La vie en violet	Ateyaba	—	48	

=== EPs ===
Year	Album	Credit	Peak positions
Year	Album	Credit	FRA
2012	Kyoto	Joke	—
2013	Tokyo	Joke	49
2015	Delorean Music	Joke	—
2020	Space Pack EP	Ateyaba	112
2024	Ecstatic	Ateyaba	—
2024	Ecstatic 1.5	Ateyaba Archive	—
2026	Roi Scorpion	Ateyaba	—

=== Mixtapes ===
Year	Album	Credit	Peak positions
Year	Album	Credit	FRA
2011	Prêt pour l'argent 1.5	Joke	—
2021	Infinigga	Ateyaba	41

=== Singles ===
Year	Title	Credit	Peak positions		Album
Year	Title	Credit	FRA	BEL (Wa)	Album
2014	"Majeur en l'air"	Joke	22	46* (Ultratip)	Ateyaba
2014	"Vénus"	Joke	19	44* (Ultratip)	Ateyaba
2014	"Miley" (feat. Dosseh)	Joke	23	–	Ateyaba
2014	"Sphinx" (feat. Rim'K & Seth Gueko)	Joke	24	–	Ateyaba
2014	"On est sur les nerfs"	Joke	142	–	Ateyaba
2014	"Black Card" (feat. Pusha T)	Joke	170	–	Ateyaba
2014	"Amistad"	Joke	192	–	Ateyaba
2014	"Le coup du patron" (with Dosseh & Gradur)	Joke	10	35* (Ultratip)	Dosseh album Perestroïka
2017	"Vision"	Joke	113	–	TBA
2017	"Playa Pt. II"	Joke	124	–	TBA
2017	"Caramelo"	Joke	154	–	TBA
2017	"Mendeleïev"	Joke	155	–	TBA
2018	"Rock with You"	Ateyaba	83	–	
2020	"Moonwalk"	Ateyaba	98	–	
2021	"Solitaires" (feat. SahBabii)	Ateyaba	145	–	

*Did not appear in the official Belgian Ultratop 50 charts, but rather in the bubbling under Ultratip charts.
