= Mérignac =

Mérignac may refer to:

== Places ==
- Mérignac, Charente, a commune in the Charente department in southwestern France
- Mérignac, Charente-Maritime, a commune in the Charente-Maritime department in southwestern France
- Mérignac, Gironde, a commune in the Gironde department in southwestern France and largest suburb of the city of Bordeaux

== Other uses ==
- Bordeaux–Mérignac Airport, the international airport of Bordeaux, situated on the territory of Mérignac, Gironde
- Mérignac Handball (MHB), handball club in the town of Mérignac, Gironde
