= Mister V (rapper) =

French YouTuber and rapper (born 1993)

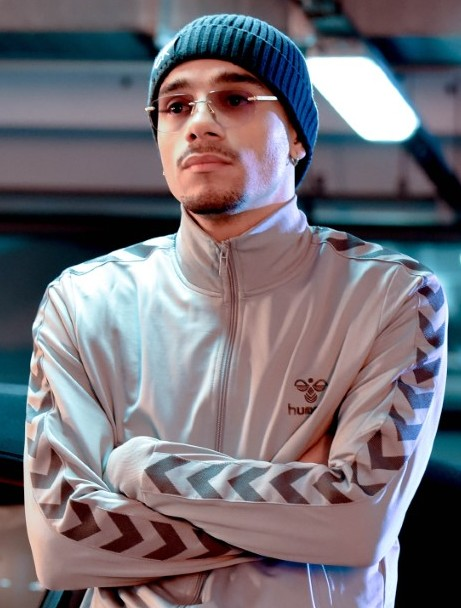
- Mister V in 2020
- Born: Yvick Letexier; 14 August 1993 (age 33); Grenoble, Isère, France
- Occupations: Internet personality; comedian; rapper; actor

YouTube information
- Channel: Mister V
- Years active: 2008–present
- Genres: Comedy; parody
- Subscribers: 6.30 million
- Views: 508 million
- Last updated: 2 September 2024

Yvick Letexier (French pronunciation: [ivik lətɛksje]; born 14 August 1993), better known as Mister V, is a French YouTuber, Internet personality, comedian, rapper, and actor. In 2014, he and six other young comedians (Hugo Dessioux, Jéremie Dethelot, Youssoupha Diaby, Hakim Jemili, Mike Kenli and MalcolmToTheWord) set up Le Woop, a collective of comedians who post their videos on YouTube, and also perform live. He is of Cameroonian descent from his mother's side and his father is Breton.

He worked alongside Norman Thavaud, Hugo Dessioux, and other French YouTubers in Le Studio Bagel.

== Biography ==
Mister V debuted atop the French SNEP albums chart in May 2017 with his debut album, Double V. His second album, MVP, also reached number-one in early 2020.

His debut album Double V sold over 21,000 copies in its first week of release. It was certified gold on 3 July 2017, with 50,536 albums sold. On 7 February 2018 the album was certified platinum, with over 100,000 copies sold.

In December 2019, he released a feat with rapper PLK called Jamais, the first single from his second album MVP janvier 2020. In January 2020, he released Gang with Dosseh, which racked up 1.6 million views in 2 days.

In June 2022, he appeared on the ZZCCMXTP Mixtape by KronoMuzik, Pandrezz and Ronare, on the tracks Vodka Rhum Contrex (with Freddy Gladieux) and Captain.

In December 2022, he and his country band Les Jones, formed by Freddy Gladieux and Vincent Tirel, released a four-track country mixtape entitled United States Of Rock.

== Discography ==
=== Albums ===
Title	Year	Peak positions				Certifications
Title	Year	FRA	BEL (Fl)	BEL (Wa)	SWI	Certifications
Double V	2017	1	—	2	10	SNEP: Platinum
MVP	2020	1	37	1	4	SNEP: Platinum

=== Singles ===
Title	Year	Peak positions			Certifications	Album
Title	Year	FRA	BEL (Wa)	SWI	Certifications	Album
"Party Night Relou"	2013	115	—	—		Non-album single
"Space Jam" (featuring Hayce Lemsi and Volts Face)	2017	5	—	81	SNEP: Gold	Double V
"Viano" (featuring Samy Ceezy)	2018	47	— (Note: "Top album" did not chart on the Walloon Ultratop chart, but peaked at number 37 on the Ultratip chart.)	—		Double V
"BTP"	2018	—	—	—		Non-album single
"Saint Laurent" (featuring RowJay)	2018	—	—	—		Non-album single
"AGAMAGOHENMAPOKE (I Got My Gun in My Pocket)"	2019	—	—	—		Non-album single
"Jamais" (featuring PLK)	2019	6	31	76	SNEP: Platinum	MVP

=== Featured singles ===
Title	Year	Peak positions			Album
Title	Year	FRA	BEL (Wa)	SWI	Album
"XPTDR" (L.E.C.K. featuring Mister V)	2013	63	—	—	Planète Rap 2013
"Massa" (Dinor RDT featuring Mister V)	2019	62	—	—	Lunettes 2 ski

=== Other charting songs ===
Title	Year	Peak positions			Certifications	Album
Title	Year	FRA	BEL (Wa)	SWI	Certifications	Album
"Top album"	2017	8	— (Note: "Top album" did not chart on the Walloon Ultratop chart, but peaked at number 3 on the Ultratip chart.)	—	SNEP: Platinum	Double V
"Petit déjeuner"	2017	22	—	—		Double V
"Venice"	2017	29	—	—		Double V
"Demain"	2017	48	—	—		Double V
"Bulletproof"	2017	58	—	—		Double V
"Nightcall"	2017	65	—	—		Double V
"Thérapie"	2017	68	—	—		Double V
"Cendrillon"	2017	86	—	—		Double V
"Bonobo"	2017	112	—	—		Double V
"Apollo 13" (featuring Juice)	2017	30	—	—		Double V
"Deutsche Qualität" (featuring Samy Ceezy)	2017	36	—	—		Double V
"Gville" (featuring Tortoz)	2017	36	—	—		Double V
"Lambo" (featuring PLK)	2018	121	—	—		Taxi 5 soundtrack
"Gang" (featuring Dosseh)	2020	10	45	81	SNEP: Gold	MVP
"Pirelli" (featuring Jul)	2020	9	—	70	SNEP: Gold	MVP
"Facetime"	2020	16	—	—		MVP
"Tudo bem"	2020	18	—	—		MVP
"Vice City"	2020	21	—	—		MVP
"Clinton"	2020	24	—	—		MVP
"Femme de ménage"	2020	35	—	—		MVP
"Boogie"	2020	36	—	—		MVP
"Vert"	2020	47	—	—		MVP
"Miami Heat"	2020	48	—	—		MVP
"Lidl"	2020	49	—	—		MVP
"Titanic"	2020	53	—	—		MVP
"Menace"	2020	56	—	—		MVP
"Kungfu"	2020	65	—	—		MVP
"Payakaroon"	2020	68	—	—		MVP
"Moulin rouge"	2020	72	—	—		MVP
"On y est"	2020	76	—	—		MVP
"Gas" (featuring Gazo)	2021	41	— (Note: "Top album" did not chart on the Walloon Ultratop chart, but peaked at number 14 on the Ultratip chart.)	—		MVP (Réédition)
"Tempête" (featuring Laylow)	2021	107	—	—		MVP (Réédition)
"Vettel"	2021	134	—	—		MVP (Réédition)
"Le tour" (featuring Naza)	2021	137	—	—		MVP (Réédition)
"G-Wagon"	2021	189	—	—		MVP (Réédition)

== Filmography ==
=== Film ===
Year	Title	Role	Director
2016	Pattaya	A student of Reza	Franck Gastambide
2016	Camping 3	Kevin	Fabien Onteniente
2017	Le Manoir	Djamal	Tony Datis
2018	Place publique	Biggistar	Agnès Jaoui
2019	All Inclusive	Pépito	Fabien Onteniente
2025	McWalter	McWalter	Simon Astier

=== Web series ===
Year	Title	Role
2017	Tout pour le muscle: Killian Amontana (2 episodes)	
2017	Les Déguns	

=== Television ===
- 2013-2015: Le Dézapping du Before on Canal+
- 2013: Le Débarquement on Canal+
- 2016: Le tour du Bagel on Canal+
- 2016: Le Woop: Mission Grand Rex on C8
- 2016: Fort Boyard on France 2
- 2018: Norbert commis d'office on 6ter

== Shows ==
- 2012: Le Zapping Amazing, at the Grand Rex (with La Ferme Jérome, Cyprien, Le Palmashow, Kemar, Julfou, Julien Donzé, PV Nova, Spicy Marguerites, Volt, Backstage Rodéo)
- 2013: Le Zapping Amazing 2 (French tour)
- 2014-2016: Le Woop sur scène (French tour)
- 2015: Le Woop at the Bataclan
- 2016: Le Woop at the Grand Rex

== Videography ==
Dailymotion

- 2008-2010: La Wii / 17 ans / La philosophie / Les comédies musicales

YouTube

- 2010: L'éducation sexuelle / Jean Michel Pokora / Les 5 photos de profil Facebook
- 2011: Être en couple / La politique / Colonel Crado - "Toutes les nuits" (Colonel Reyel) [Parodie] / Le métissage / Les 5 nouvelles photos de profil / Mc Jacky - Le rap des clichés / Secret Story / Le bac / La bagarre / Le basketball / Le permis de conduire
- 2012: Les boîtes de nuit / Être célibataire / Être célibataire (soft version for kids) / Trouver un job / Partir en vacances / La danse
- 2012 (in partnership with M6 Mobile): Les jeux vidéo / Les super-héros / Les vampires / Les bonnes résolutions
- 2013: Le mystère de l'épaule gauche / Le rap / Los Angeles (feat. Cyprien & La Ferme Jérôme) / Le cannabis / Le R'n'B
- 2014: La police / Dormir
- 2015: Avoir un gosse / McWalter
- 2016: McWalter et la menace Kibuja (Parts 1 & 2) / Les States / Le service / Rap vs. Réalité
- 2017: Faire un album / La police 2 / Faire un album La suite
- 2018: McWalter 3 / Le Québec
- 2019: J'ai 25 ans / Le rap vs la réalité 2
- 2020: Faire un album 2 / Modifie mon véhicule
- 2021: La police 3
- 2022: La Pizza Delamama
- 2023: Je sors 2 nouvelles pizzas ! / Les Jones / Les 11 rappeurs à ne pas suivre / J’ai gagné la course à Squeezie (C’est le GP Explorer 2) / La pizza Delamama 2

Studio Bagel

- 2012-2013 (Season 1): BagelField: serviette / Marre de te faire recaler en boîte? / Le mariage gay / La Crise: Noël 2012 / Le Raid: Au cœur de l'action / 200 000 Abonnés: Clip / L'incroyable destin de Wilfried Destin / L'Inside: le Tatouage / L'Inside: Le Tour de magie / Et si l'alcool ne faisait plus effet? / Frenchies in Vegas: Clip
- 2013-2014 (Season 2): C'était le Studio Bagel: escabeau / En couple sur Facebook?: Miguel / Le Gang des Clowns: Le présentateur TV / La Friendzone: Steven, l'ami gay / L'ultime recours / La beauféthie: Denis (Personage Principal)
- 2014-2015 (Season 3): Déjà vu: Le meilleur ami du héros / La soirée / Le Casting du Studio Bagel: Lui-même / Pas très Charlie / Le Bucket (with Kevin Razy) (Sketch show)
- 2015-2017 (Le Tour du Bagel): High Crous Musical: Régis / Ratatouille: Fred / Clash d’astéroïde: Young Chapo2paille / Shooter: Shooter
- 2023 (MST : Moyennement Sûr du Titre) : Comme ça vient / Montre ça vraiment à tout le monde / Ultimate Wrestle Dazzle / Le figurant / Les tubes de la belle époque / L’arnaque de Tinder / Le commis d’office / Hacker / Une place à Paris / Tu savais pas ? / Coup de foudre au lycée
