= Or Noir =

Album by Kaaris

Or Noir (French pronunciation: [ɔʁ nwaʁ]; "Black Gold") is a series of albums by Kaaris with three albums issued to date: the original Or Noir (2013), Or Noir Part II (2014) and Or Noir Part 3 (2019).

== Or Noir ==
Or Noir

Studio album by Kaaris
- Released: 21 October 2013
- Recorded: 2013
- Genre: Hardcore hip hop; trap
- Label: Therapy Music; AZ; Universal Music; Back to the Future

Kaaris chronology
Z.E.R.O (2012)	Or Noir (2013)	Or Noir Part II (2014)

Singles from Or Noir
- 1. "Zoo" Released: 25 January 2013; 2. "Binks" Released: 3 May 2013; 3. "Paradis ou enfer" Released: 6 September 2013; 4. "Dès le départ" Released: 20 September 2013; 5. "63" Released: 2 October 2013; 6. "Or noir" Released: 11 December 2013

Or Noir is a 2013 album release by French rapper Kaaris signed with Tallac Records, a label established by rapper Booba. Or noir his major album on Therapy Music / AZ / Universal Music was on 21 October 2013 after Kaaris' initial success with album Z.E.R.O in 2012 released independently.

=== Track listing ===
1. "Bizon" (3:15)
2. "Zoo" (4:48)
3. "Ciroc" (4:21)
4. "Mbm" (3:16)
5. "Binks" (4:15)
6. "Je bibi" (5:18)
7. "Bouchon de liège" (4:24)
8. "Paradis ou enfer" (4:53)
9. "L.E.F" (featuring Booba) (3:47)
10. "Dès le départ" (4:06)
11. "Pas de remède" (3:38)
12. "63" (4:11)
13. "Bébé" (3:26)
14. "Plus rien" (3:50)
15. "Or noir" (3:11)
16. "Tu me connais" (4:05)
17. "2 et demi" (4:50)

=== Charts ===
Chart (2013)	Peak position
Belgian Albums (Ultratop Wallonia)	12
French Albums (SNEP)	3
Swiss Albums (Schweizer Hitparade)	35

== Or Noir Part II ==
Or Noir Part II

Studio album by Kaaris
- Released: 28 February 2014 (download); 3 March 2014 (physical release)
- Recorded: 2013–2014
- Genre: Hardcore hip hop; trap
- Label: Therapy Music; Capitol

Kaaris chronology
Or Noir (2013)	Or Noir Part II (2014)	Le bruit de mon âme (2015)

Singles from Or Noir Part. II
- 1. "Sombre" Released: February 2014; 2. "S.E.V.R.A.N" Released: February 2014; 3. "À l'heure" Released: March 2014

In 2014, Kaaris released the follow-up Or Noir Part II after the release of the original album. The album released 3 months after the release of Or Noir was on Therapy Music Records online on 28 February 2014 followed by physical release on Capitol Records on 3 March 2014. The new album contained 11 additional tracks.

=== Track listing ===
1. "Intro" (2:51)
2. "Sombre" (2:37)
3. "S.E.V.R.A.N" (4:22)
4. "Comment je fais" (4:05)
5. "À l'heure" (4:25)
6. "Juste" (3:57)
7. "Chargé" (4:39)
8. "Pablito" (3:10)
9. "Killé" (4:26)
10. "Je remplis l'sac" (3:33)
11. "À la barrière" (4:39)

=== Charts ===
Chart (2014)	Peak position
Belgian Albums (Ultratop Flanders)	164
Belgian Albums (Ultratop Wallonia)	13
French Albums (SNEP)	137
Swiss Albums (Schweizer Hitparade)	63

== Or Noir Part 3 ==
Or Noir Part 3

Studio album by Kaaris
- Released: 25 January 2019
- Recorded: 2018
- Genre: Hardcore hip hop, trap
- Label: Def Jam

Kaaris chronology
Dozo (2017)	Or Noir Part 3 (2019)

Singles from Or Noir Part 3
- 1. "Débrouillard" Released: 14 December 2018; 2. "Aieaieouille" Released: 18 January 2019

In 2019, Kaaris released a second follow up Or Noir Part 3 after 4 years of the release of the follow-up Or Noir Part II.

=== Track listing ===
1. "Chien de la casse" (4:09)
2. "Monsieur Météo" (2:50)
3. "Briganté" (featuring Mac Tyer & Sofiane) (4:18)
4. "Gun Salute" (3:29)
5. "Golf7 R" (3:57)
6. "Livraison" (2:30)
7. "Aieaieouille" (3:17)
8. "Débrouillard" (2:56)
9. "Détails" (2:45)
10. "Ça on l'a" (2:44)
11. "Cigarette" (featuring SCH) (3:23)
12. "Tout était écrit" (2:53)
13. "Dévalisé" (3:08)
14. "Douane" (3:15)
15. "Comme un refrain" (3:14)

Chart (2019)	Peak position
Belgian Albums (Ultratop Flanders)	114
Belgian Albums (Ultratop Wallonia)	2
French Albums (SNEP)	2
Swiss Albums (Schweizer Hitparade)	13
