= Sefyu =

- Born: Youssef Soukouna; 20 April 1981 (age 45); Paris, France
- Genre: Hip hop

Youssef Soukouna (born 20 April 1981 in Goutte d'Or, Paris), better known by his stage name Sefyu (French pronunciation: [sɛfju], his first name in verlan), is a French rapper of Senegalese descent. He comes from Aulnay-sous-Bois, a city in the French department of Seine-Saint-Denis of which is located within the northern suburbs of Paris. Sefyu originally aspired to become a professional soccer player, but his dream was derailed after he sustained an injury whilst playing for English club Arsenal. He emerged upon the hip-hop scene in the early 2000s to commercial and critical acclaim.

== Biography ==
Born in Paris, Sefyu played football for a great deal of time in the role of a left-winger. He went on to England to feature for London club Arsenal where he got an injury which eventually ended his playing days. As so he then changed his focus towards a career in hip hop.

A member of the crews “NCC” (Natural Court Circuit –“ Natural Short Circuit”) and “G-Huit”, he started his ascent to fame by rapping with Rohff on his album La Fierté des nôtres, released in June 2004.

He has worked with a vast array of French rappers, including Moystaff du Bengale, Nemesis, Ritmo, La K-Bine crew, Passi, Sniper and Daddy Lord C. He performed publicly in 2001 at the Francofolies de la Rochelle.

In 2005, he released an EP entitled Molotov 4, which was produced by Kore et Skalp. In April 2006, Sefyu released his first album, titled Qui suis-je ?. Sefyu's style of rap is characterised by a few features: a deep, husky voice, and a range of unique phrases. These include Crrr!, an onomatopoeia imitating the sound of a gun being cocked and Crouille, French slang for riffraff or undercover. Some of his songs belong to the hardcore hip-hop genre such as “La vie qui va avec”, whereas others are inspired by R’n’B music like that of “Un point c’est tout”.

His 2007 song “”Lettre du Front” was released on R&B singer Kenza Farah's album Authentik. Authentik was released in the same year and as well garnered gold status.

On 12 May 2008 Sefyu released his second album, Suis-je le gardien de mon frère? Prior to its release, Sefyu made public the acclaimed singles “Mon Public”, “Molotov 4” and “Au pays du zahef” which contributed to the album's commercial success. According to Planète Rap Magazine, 106,453 copies of Sefyu's second LP were sold in France in 2008. Suis-je le gardien de mon frère? was eventually certified gold. On 1 March 2009 Sefyu went on to win the Victoire de la Musique Award, in the category “Revelation of the year”.

Sefyu seldom shows his face, and often hides it by wearing a hoody or covering it with his fist, a ski mask, or his fitted hat. The reason for this is twofold, firstly out of respect for those struggling to be noticed within the music industry as well so that of persons would comprehend that one's image is of little note within such altogether.

== Discography ==
=== Albums ===
- Qui suis-je? (2006)
- Suis-je le gardien de mon frère? (2008)
- Oui je le suis (2011)
- Yusef (2019)

=== Collaborations ===
- 2001

Sefyu - "La lutte libère" on "Sachons dire NON Vol.1" La K-Bine Feat Sefyu - "Des hommes en kolère" on "Le Rap est mort" (By La K-Bine)

- 2002

Gentlemen Feat Sefyu - "Vision 200" on The Gentlemen's album, "Mortelle Saint-Valentin"

- 2003

Sefyu Feat Rohff, Zesau & Dry - "Baiser" on "Talents fâchés Vol.1" La K-Bine Feat Sefyu - "Crimes impunis" on La K-Bine's album, "Rapport de force"

- 2004

Rohff Feat Sefyu, Alibi Montana & Kamel L'ancien - "Code 187" on Rohff's album, "La fierté des nôtres" Sefyu - "Flow du Malawi" on "Talents fâchés Vol.2"

- 2005

Ol' Kainry & Dany Dan Feat Sefyu, Alibi Montana & Nubi - "Crie mon nom Remix" on the street CD of the same name K.ommando Toxic Feat Sefyu - "Pucc fiction Remix" on K.ommando Toxic' album, "Retour vers le futur" Seth Gueko Feat Sefyu - "Patate de forain" on Seth Gueko's street CD, "Barillet plein" Sefyu - "Interlude explicit" on "De la poudre au Rap" Samat Feat Sefyu, Larsen & Alibi Montana - "Ghetto guerrier" on Samat's mixtape, "Samat Feat Hip Hop de rue" Mic Fury Feat Sefyu & Alonzo - "Street zoologie" on Mic Fury's album, "Au bout du tunnel" Sefyu Feat Kuamen - "On vit comme on peut" on "Patrimoine du ghetto" Gentlemen Feat NCC - "Sourire de la haine" on The Gentlemen's mixtape, "Cobra"

- 2006

Sefyu Feat RR & A.P. - "On va te douiller" on "Illegal radio Alibi "

- 2007

Aketo Feat Sefyu, Tunisiano & Six Coups Mc - "Style certifié" on Aketo's street CD, "Cracheur 2 venin" Rim'K Feat Sefyu - "Parloir fantôme" on Rim'K's album, "Famille nombreuse" Kenzah Farah Feat Sefyu - "Lettre du front" on Kenza's album, "Authentik" Alibi Montana Feat Sefyu&LIM - "Honneur aux ghettos"

- 2008

Participated in Urban Peace 2, a hip-hop concert in 2008

- 2009

La Fouine Feat Sefyu & Soprano - "Ça fait mal Remix" Sefyu Feat RR - "L'œil du ghetto" on "Les yeux dans la banlieue Vol.2"

== Awards ==
- 2009 : Artiste ou révélation du public aux Victoires de la musique avec son album « Suis-je le gardien de mon frère ? ».

Preceded by Christophe Maé	Victoires de la Musique; Group or artist popular révélation of the year 2009	Succeeded by Pony Pony Run Run
