= Dosseh (rapper) =

French rapper and actor (born 1985)

Dorian Dosseh N'Goumou (French pronunciation: [dɔse dɔʁjɑ̃ ɛnɡumu]; born 26 January 1985) is a French rapper, singer, film producer and actor. He is the younger brother of Pit Baccardi.

== Life and Career ==
Dosseh was born in Orléans, and raised in Saint-Jean-de-la-Ruelle, Centre. Starting his career at a young age, he appeared in a number of albums as collaborations with artists like Booba and Seth Gueko, in addition to Niro, Sofiane, Kaaris, Rim'K, Youssoupha, Médine and his brother Pit Baccardi. These include Bolide, Volumes 1 and 2 and Talents Fachés 2. In 2011, he launched the mixtape Desperadoss followed by a series of mixtapes titled Summer Crack in three volumes (2011, 2012, 2015) and took part in the rap compilation We Made It in 2012. In 2013, he launched his film Karma, where he included a number of French rappers. In 2014, he was signed to the label Def Jam France giving him a wider promotion allowing him to appear in features with Gradur and Joke. In 2015, he released his street album Perestroïka followed by his first studio album Yuri. He also collaborated with the Toronto rapper Tory Lanez. In 2018, he released the album Vidalo$$a, with the single "Habitué" peaking at number 1 on SNEP, the official French Singles Chart.

On 30 November 2022 Trop tôt pour mourir was released, containing featurings with Tiakola, Zed, Werenoi, Leto, Lacrim, Dinos and Momsii.

== Discography ==
=== Albums ===
Studio albums

Year	Title	Chart positions				Certification
Year	Title	FRA	BEL (Fl)	BEL (Wa)	SWI	Certification
2016	Yuri	17	–	29	73	
2016	Vidalo$$a	3	144	3	20	
2022	Trop tôt pour mourir	2	–	12	23	France: Gold

Street albums

Year	Title	Chart positions			Certification
Year	Title	FRA	BEL (Wa)	SWI	Certification
2015	Perestroïka	13	30	75	

=== Mixtapes ===
Year	Title	Chart positions	
Year	Title	FRA	BEL (Wa)
2011	Desperadoss	101	–
2011	Summer Crack Mixtape	–	–
2012	Summer Crack Volume 2	–	–
2012	Summer Crack Volume 3	58	49
2019	Summer Crack Volume 4	24	42

Featured in

- 2004: Bolide Vol. 1
- 2008: Bolide Vol. 2

=== Soundtracks ===
Year	Title	Chart positions
Year	Title	FRA
2013	Karma	173

=== Singles ===
Year	Title	Chart positions			Album
Year	Title	FRA	BEL (Wa)	SWI	Album
2014	"Le coup du patron" (with Gradur and Joke)	10	–	–	Perestroïka
2017	"PDCV (Pas dans cette vie)"	108	Tip	–	Yuri
2018	"Tout est neuf" (feat. Sadek)	36	Tip	–	Vidalo$$a
2018	"KFC"	60	Tip	–	Vidalo$$a
2018	"Habitué"	1	17	57	Vidalo$$a
2019	"Le bruit du Silence"	166	–	–	
2019	"L'odeur du Charbon" (featuring Maes)	18	–	–	
2019	"Thaïlande"	89	–	–	
2020	"A45"	148	–	–	
2021	"La vie d'avant"	140	–	–	

=== Other charting songs ===
Year	Title	Chart positions		Album
Year	Title	FRA	BEL (Wa)	Album
2015	"Bouteilles et glocks" (feat. Kaaris)	91	–	Perestroïka
2015	"Bando"	106	–	Perestroïka
2016	"Infréquentables" (feat. Booba)	19	Tip	Yuri
2016	"Putain d'époque" (feat. Nekfeu)	19	–	
2018	"VLT " (feat. Lacrim)	48	–	Vidalo$$a
2018	"Princes de la ville" (feat. Vegedream)	91	–	Vidalo$$a
2018	"Jet privé" (feat. Kalash)	133	–	Vidalo$$a
2018	"45 atmo" (feat. Votorious, Ppros & Biss)	189	–	Vidalo$$a
2018	"MQTB" (feat. Booba)	24	Tip	Vidalo$$a
2018	"Voilà pourquoi"	66	–	Vidalo$$a
2018	"Pour vous par nous"	109	–	Vidalo$$a
2018	"À chaque jour..."	27	Tip	Vidalo$$a
2018	"Ma keh à moi"	58	–	Vidalo$$a
2018	"Vidolo$$a"	85	–	Vidalo$$a
2018	"Sommet"	57	–	Vidalo$$a
2018	"Toit du monde"	150	–	Vidalo$$a
2018	"Paris en août"	173	–	Vidalo$$a
2018	"La rue c'est rasoir"	152	–	Vidalo$$a

=== Featured in ===
Year	Title	Chart positions			Album
Year	Title	FRA	BEL (Wa)	SWI	Album
2014	"Miley" (Joke feat. Dosseh)	23	–	–	
2020	"Gang" (Mister V feat. Dosseh)	10	45	81	Mister V album MVP

== Filmography ==
=== Music videos ===
Year	Title	Album	Director
2014	"Illuminati"	Perestroïka	Nicolas Noel; NVZ Productions
2014	"Boyscout"	Perestroïka	Nicolas Noel; NVZ Productions
2014	Le Coup du patron (feat. Gradur et Joke)	Perestroïka	Nicolas Noel; NVZ Productions
2015	"Le Dehors"	Perestroïka	Threzor Eilhs
2015	"Bouteilles et Glocks" (feat. Kaaris)	Perestroïka	Nicolas Noel NVZ Productions
2015	"Bando"	Perestroïka	Beat Bounce
2015	Scarla	Perestroïka	Beat Bounce
2015	"Été au tieks"	Summer Crack 3	Charly Clodion
2015	"Brolyk"	Summer Crack 3	Cédric Cayla
2015	"Oublier" (feat. Magasco)	Summer Crack 3	Charly Clodion
2016	"Milliers d'Euros" (feat. Young Thug)	Yuri	
2016	"African History X"	Yuri	Beat Bounce
2016	"Abel et Caïn"	Yuri	Beat Bounce
2016	"Infréquentables" (feat. Booba)	Yuri	Chris Macari
2016	"Myah Bay"	Yuri	Cédrick Cayla
2017	"Solo"	Yuri	Beat Bounce
2017	"PDCV (Pas Dans Cette Vie)"	Vidalo$$a	Christopher H
2018	"Tout est neuf" (feat. Sadek)	Vidalo$$a	Chris Macari
2018	"KFC"	Vidalo$$a	Chris Macari
2018	"Papillon" (feat. 13 Block)	Vidalo$$a	Chris Macari
2018	"Habitué"	Vidalo$$a	Chris Macari
2018	"VLT" (feat. Lacrim)	Vidalo$$a	Chris Macari
2018	"MQTB" (feat. Booba)	Vidalo$$a	Chris Macari

=== Films ===
- 2018 Paradise Beach
- Do-si-do
