= PLK (rapper) =

French rapper

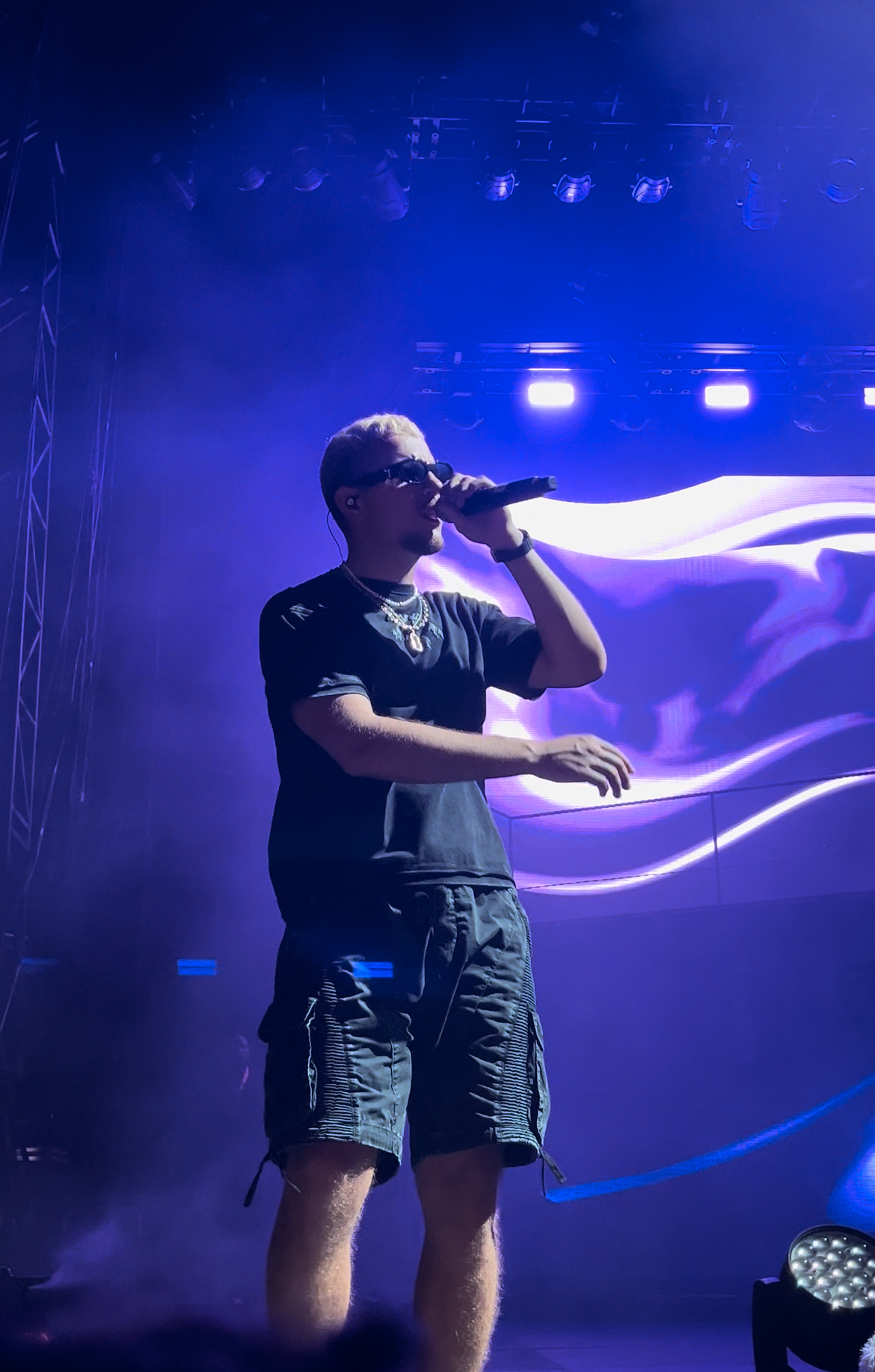
- PLK in July 2024

Background information
- Born: Mathieu Claude Daniel Pruski; 15 April 1997 (age 29); Paris, France
- Genres: Hip hop, French rap
- Years active: 2011–present
- Labels: Def Jam Recordings France, Panenka Music

Mathieu Claude Daniel Pruski (French: [matjø klod danjɛl pʁyski], Polish: [ˈpruskʲi]; born 15 April 1997) better known by the stage name PLK (acronym for Polak), is a French rapper of Polish and Corsican descent. He is Polish on his father's side, and it was his paternal grandfather who fled to France during World War II to escape German oppression. As he mentions in his EP 2069, in the song Décembre: "From Paris all the way to Warsaw (Huh?), Grandpa had run away (Yeah)". His mother is from Ajaccio, Corsica. Pruski grew up in 14th arrondissement of Paris. He started writing lyrics when he was nine and composing when he was 13. Being called "mini Polak", he adopted Polak (PLK) as his artistic name to emphasize his Polish roots. At 14, he was part of the formation La Confrérie alongside Ormaz and Zeu. He later became a member of the formation Panama Bende a band formed by seven young artists from Paris together releasing the EP Bende Mafia in 2016 and the album ADN in 2017.

In 2015 and 2016, he released two EPs, Peur de me tromper and Dedans. He launched a solo career by signing with the label Panenka Music in June 2017 after having collaborated with Fonky Flav' known as "Fonk", a member of the rap group 1995. Fonk had been a founder of the label Panenka Music. Soon he released two mixtapes Ténébreux and Platinum which gained him greater fame. In both he featured the rapper Krisy. He also appeared in Rentre dans le Cercle produced by the rapper Sofiane. He collaborated with rapper Lefa from Sexion d'Assaut and appeared in the soundtrack of Taxi 5 with the track "Lambo" in collaboration with Mister V. Other collaborations included rappers SCH, Nekfeu and Polish rapper Paluch.

In October 2018, PLK released his first album Polak, that was certified platinum. His follow up album Mental released in September 2019 is his highest ranking album so far.

== Discography ==
=== Albums ===
Title	Year	Peak positions				Certifications
Title	Year	FRA	BEL (Fl)	BEL (Wa)	SWI	Certifications
Polak	2018	6	—	9	31	SNEP: 2× Platinum
Enna	2020	2	23	3	5	SNEP: Diamond
2069'	2023	2	163	2	2	SNEP: Platinum
Chambre 140	2024	1	—	1	1	
Grand garçon	2026	1	169	1	3	

=== Mixtapes ===
Title	Year	Peak positions			Certifications
Title	Year	FRA	BEL (Wa)	SWI	Certifications
Ténébreux	2017	35	48	—	
Platinum	2018	13	30	90	SNEP: Gold
Mental	2019	2	46 (FL); 5 (WA)	15	SNEP: 2× Platinum

=== EPs ===
- 2015: Peur de me tromper
- 2016: Dedans

=== Singles ===
==== As lead artist ====
Title	Year	Peak positions			Certifications	Album / EP
Title	Year	FRA	BEL (Wa)	SWI	Certifications	Album / EP
"Pas les mêmes"	2018	129	—	—		Platinum
"Dis-moi oui"	2018	60	—	—	SNEP: Gold	Platinum
"Problèmes"	2019	6	37	—	SNEP: Diamond	Mental
"Un peu de haine"	2019	1	19	44	SNEP: Platinum	Mental
"Bénef"	2020	14	37	—	SNEP: Gold	Enna
"C'est mort"	2020	8	42	—	SNEP: Gold	Enna
"Pas bien" (with Kore)	2021	33	—	—		En Passant Pécho (soundtrack)
"A la base"	2021	6	39	—		Non-album singles
"Attentat" (featuring Oboy)	2021	4	43	—		Non-album singles
"Émotif (Booska 1H)"	2022	50	—	—		Non-album singles
"Décembre"	2023	17	—	—		2069'
"Demain"	2023	1	13	25		2069'
"Ça mène à rien" (featuring Gazo)	2024	2	18	—		Chambre 140 (Part.1)
"La nuit"	2024	8	43	—		Chambre 140 (Part.1)
"En mieux" (with Hamza)	2024	7	38	—		Chambre 140 (Part.2)
"Faut pas" (with Jul)	2024	5	42	33		Chambre 140 (Part.3)
"Confidences" (with Vacra)	2024	15	40	—		Non-album single
"Sex Model" (with Theodora)	2026	3	47	38		Grand garçon
"Pocahontas"	2026	1	26	—		Grand garçon

*Did not appear in the official Belgian Ultratop 50 charts, but rather in the bubbling under Ultratip charts.

==== As featured artist ====
Title	Year	Peak positions			Certifications	Album
Title	Year	FRA	BEL (Wa)	SWI	Certifications	Album
"Lambo" (Mister V feat. PLK)	2018	121	—	—		Taxi 5 (Soundtrack)
"Comme à l'ancienne" (RK feat. PLK)	2019	128	—	—		RK album Rêves de gosse
"Jamais" (Mister V feat. PLK)	2019	6	31	76	SNEP: Platinum	Mister V album MVP
"Mec de cité" (Yaro feat. Ninho & PLK)	2020	24	10* (Ultratip)	—	SNEP: Gold	Non-album release
"Promis" (Timal feat. PLK)	2020	17	—	—		Timal album Caliente
"Train de vie" (Leto feat. PLK)	2020	11	18* (Ultratip)	—	SNEP: Gold	Non-album release
"Omar" (Koba LaD feat. PLK)	2020	17	—	—		Koba LaD album Détail
"Aminata" (13 Block feat. PLK)	2020	71	—	—		13 Block album BLO II
"Tu vois comment" (ZKR feat. PLK)	2021	7	9* (Ultratip)	—		ZKR album Dans les mains
"Cosmos" (Rim'K feat. PLK)	2021	7	—	—		Rim'K album ADN
"Le bruit des applaudissements" (SDM feat. PLK)	2021	30	—	—		SDM album Ocho
"Arriba" (Caballero feat. PLK)	2021	136	—	—		Caballero album Oso
"Petrouchka" (Soso Maness feat. PLK)	2021	1	1	19		Soso Maness album Avec le temps

=== Other charting songs ===
Title	Year	Peak positions			Certifications	Album / EP
Title	Year	FRA	BEL (Wa)	SWI	Certifications	Album / EP
"Pas besoin"	2018	78	—	—		Platinum
"A A A"	2018	146	—	—		Platinum
"250"	2018	89	—	—		Polak
"Hier" (feat. SCH)	2018	16	—	—	SNEP: Gold	Polak
"Waow" (feat. Nekfeu)	2018	32	—	—	SNEP: Gold	Polak
"Monégasque"	2018	33	13* (Ultratip)	—	SNEP: Platinum	Polak
"Idiote"	2018	67	—	—		Polak
"Polak"	2018	75	—	—		Polak
"Séparer"	2018	104	—	—		Polak
"Bunkoeur"	2018	105	—	—		Polak
"Intro"	2018	109	—	—		Polak
"Ils nous comprennent pas"	2018	117	—	—		Polak
"Le sel"	2018	119	—	—		Polak
"Gozier" (feat. Paluch)	2018	127	—	—		Polak
"Weed"	2018	142	—	—		Polak
"Dingue"	2019	22	15* (Ultratip)	—	SNEP: Gold	Non-album release
"Émotif" (Booska-P magazine release)	2019	39	—	—	SNEP: Gold	Non-album release
"Sans suite"	2019	150	—	—		Non-album release
"Toute l'année" (feat. Timal)	2019	16	—	—	SNEP: Gold	Mental
"Hola"	2019	22	—	—		Mental
"Arai"	2019	25	—	—		Mental
"Cartelo" (feat. Maes)	2019	30	—	—		Mental
"Nana"	2019	33	—	—		Mental
"Travailler"	2019	43	—	—		Mental
"Tout recommencer" (feat. Tessa B.)	2019	48	—	—		Mental
"Meilleur cauchemar"	2019	50	—	—		Mental
"Mental"	2019	76	—	—		Mental
"Ma génération"	2019	79	—	—		Mental
"Corazon" (feat. Aladin 135)	2019	80	—	—		Mental
"V2V"	2019	86	—	—		Mental
"Intr100000"	2019	88	—	—		Mental
"RS3"	2019	98	—	—		Mental
"Temps perdu"	2019	102	—	—		Mental
"TT"	2019	103	—	—		Mental
"Le P"	2019	110	—	—		Mental
"On sait jamais" (feat. Niska)	2020	3	46	37	SNEP: Gold	Enna
"Pilote" (feat. Hamza)	2020	5	—	42	SNEP: Platinum	Enna
"Chandon et Moët" (feat. Heuss l'Enfoiré)	2020	10	—	—	SNEP: Gold	Enna
"Les comptes"	2020	11	Tip	—		Enna
"Dans les clips"	2020	12	—	71		Enna
"Billet d'20"	2020	13	—	—		Enna
"Pourtant"	2020	17	Tip	—		Enna
"Dégaine de bandit"	2020	18	—	—		Enna
"Toutes générations" (feat. Rim'K)	2020	20	—	—		Enna
"Mamie"	2020	22	—	—		Enna
"Alleluia"	2020	23	—	—		Enna
"Au fond d'ma tête"	2020	26	—	—		Enna
"Calme"	2020	28	—	—		Enna
"Terrible"	2020	30	—	—		Enna
"3 en 1"	2020	31	—	—		Enna
"La vie c'est marrant"	2020	35	—	—		Enna
"10 Minutes" (featuring Dinos)	2023	4	37	—		2069'
"Nouvelles"	2023	3	41	—		2069'
"7/7"	2023	6	—	—		2069'
"Cash"	2023	9	—	—		2069'
"Pol-K"	2023	10	—	—		2069'
"Pelo"	2023	11	—	—		2069'
"Pas de sentiments"	2023	16	—	—		2069'
"Panana bende"	2023	23	—	—		2069'
"Pêriph"	2024	11	—	—		Chambre 140 (Part.1)
"EA7"	2024	14	—	—		Chambre 140 (Part.1)
"A L'Envers"	2024	20	—	—		Chambre 140 (Part.1)
"Gare Du Nord"	2024	26	—	—		Chambre 140 (Part.1)
"Flash"	2024	27	—	—		Chambre 140 (Part.1)
"Sun"	2024	48	—	—		Chambre 140 (Part.1)
"Interlude"	2024	64	—	—		Chambre 140 (Part.1)
"*"	2024	82	—	—		Chambre 140 (Part.1)
"Il Pleut À Paris"	2024	10	—	—		Chambre 140 (Part.2)
"Mignon Tout Plein"	2024	17	—	—		Chambre 140 (Part.2)
"Bikini Bottom"	2024	25	—	—		Chambre 140 (Part.2)
"Dangereux"	2024	41	—	—		Chambre 140 (Part.2)
"P*Tain"	2024	47	—	—		Chambre 140 (Part.2)
"J'Attends"	2024	55	—	—		Chambre 140 (Part.2)
"Chambre 140"	2024	67	—	—		Chambre 140 (Part.2)
"Avec Les Miens"	2024	68	—	—		Chambre 140 (Part.2)
"Chouchou"	2024	32	—	—		Chambre 140 (Part.3)
"Ça Fait Longtemps"	2024	44	—	—		Chambre 140 (Part.3)
"Onana"	2024	57	—	—		Chambre 140 (Part.3)
"La Vraie Vie"	2024	74	—	—		Chambre 140 (Part.3)
"1€ / 1Eu"	2024	84	—	—		Chambre 140 (Part.3)
"Mon Poto"	2024	97	—	—		Chambre 140 (Part.3)
"Une Pèche Une Patate"	2024	99	—	—		Chambre 140 (Part.3)

*Did not appear in the official Belgian Ultratop 50 charts, but rather in the bubbling under Ultratip charts.
