= Kaaris =

French rapper

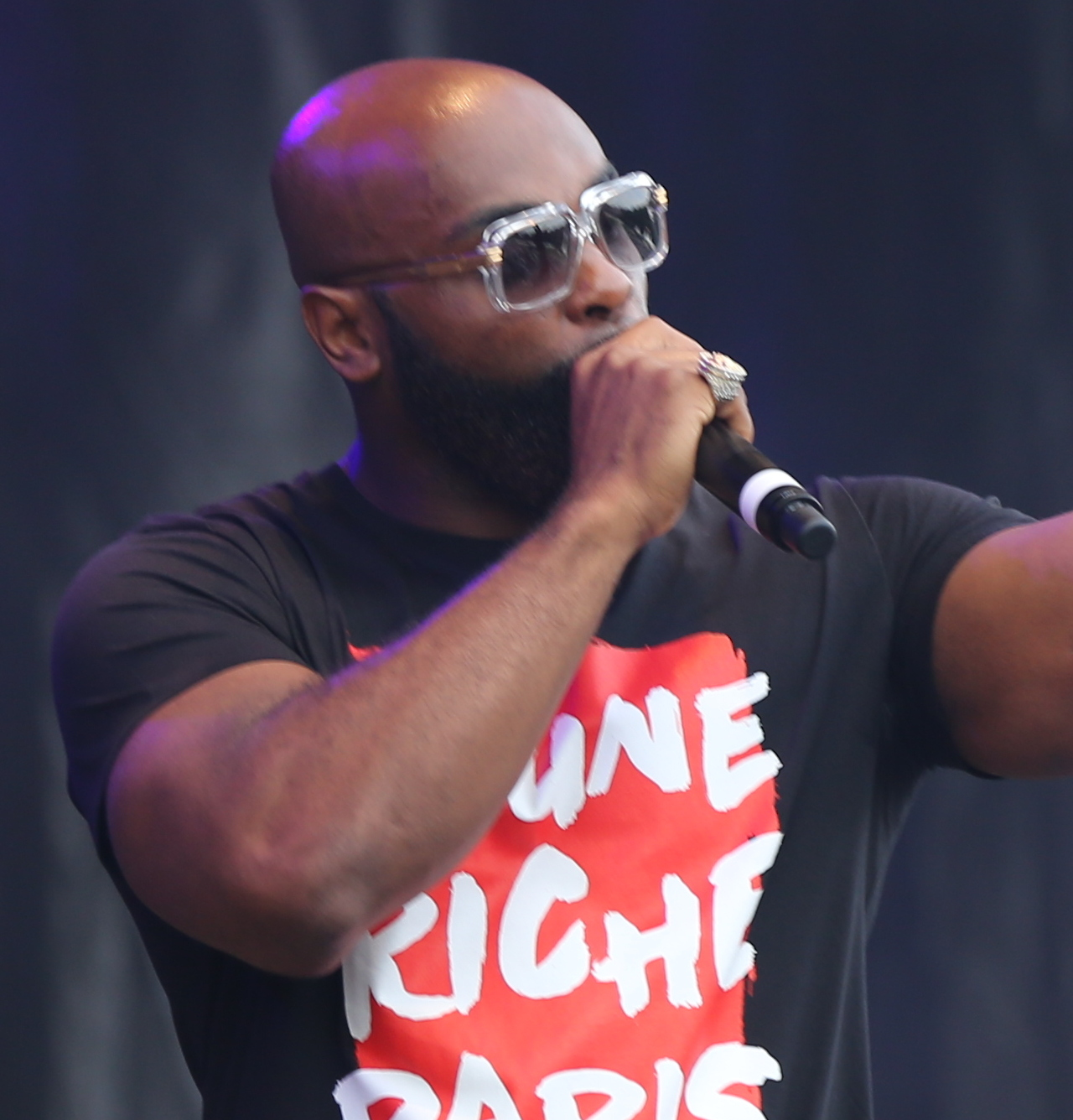
- Kaaris at the Out4Fame Festival 2016 in Hünxe, North Rhine-Westphalia, Germany

Background information
- Also known as: Fresh; K2A; Riskaa; Talsadoum; K Double Rotor; Zongo le Dozo
- Born: Armand Olivier Okou Gnakouri; January 30, 1980 (age 46); Cocody, Abidjan, Côte d’Ivoire
- Origin: Sevran, Seine-Saint-Denis, Île-de-France, France
- Genres: French hip-hop; trap
- Occupations: Rapper; actor; record producer
- Years active: 2000–present
- Labels: AZ; Def Jam; Therapy; Caroline; Arista
- Website: kaaris.store

Armand Okou Gnakouri, known by his stage name Kaaris (/ˈkɑːrɪs/, French: [kaʁis]), is a French rapper, actor and record producer.

== Early life ==
Kaaris was born in Cocody, near Abidjan. At age 3, he moved to Sevran in the Seine-Saint-Denis department, northeast of Paris.

== Career ==
Kaaris started rapping in 1999, and released his first mixtape in 2001. He returned to his native Ivory Coast for a while, but returned to France after political unrest in the country. In 2007, he released his street album 43ème Bima (pronounced "Quarante-troisième Bima"), that led to signing with a new independent label French Cut Music.

However, his meeting with French rapper Booba and producers Therapy gave him his first recording with Booba, "Criminelle league" released as part of Booba's Autopsie Vol. 4. Kaaris had his first charting hit "Kalash", credited to Booba featuring Kaaris appearing in Booba's album Futur.

Kaaris co-writes most of his materials in cooperation with a record producer duo, known as Therapy (made up of producers 2031 and 2093). On 21 October 2013, he released his studio album Or Noir on Therapy Music / AZ / Universal Music. It is considered as one of the most important in the history of French rap. With the 2014 reissue Or Noir Part 2, the album is certified platinum.

On 30 March 2015, Kaaris released his studio album Le bruit de mon âme. The record includes featuring including Lacrim, 13 Block or Future. In October 2015, he released a mixtape titled Double Fuck.

On 11 November 2016, he released his third studio album Okou Gnakouri. The album includes featurings with Gucci Mane and Kalash Criminel. In early January 2018, the record was certified double platinum with over 200,000 sold copies.

A year after the release of Okou Gnakouri, on 3 Novembre 2017, he released the album Dozo.

On 25 January 2019, he released the album Or Noir Part 3, going back to a trap style and following his 2013 album.

On 3 September, he released the album 2.7.0. He left Def Jam France and created his own label OG Record while signing for Lutèce Music, affiliated to Caroline France label.

On 28 January, he released a common album with French rapper Kalash Criminel titled SVR. The name of the album is a reference to Sevran, the city where both rappers come from.

In 2023, Kaaris featured in the Netflix film, "In His Shadow".

== Legal history ==
A fight between Booba and Kaaris led to the temporary closure of Hall 1 at Paris-Orly Airport on 1 August 2018. Kaaris was given an 18-month suspended sentence and fined €50,000.

== Discography ==
=== Albums ===
Year	Album	Peak positions			
Year	Album	FRA	BEL (Fl)	BEL (Wa)	SWI
2013	Or Noir	3	—	12	35
2014	Or Noir Part II	137	164	13	63
2015	Le bruit de mon âme	4	188	14	22
2016	Okou Gnakouri	8	—	21	57
2017	Dozo	3	159	9	59
2019	Or Noir Part 3	2	114	2	13
2020	2.7.0	4	50	5	13
2022	SVR (with Kalash Criminel)	1	106	5	12
2023	Day One	—	—	27	23
2026	Byakugan	2	—	9	10

=== Mixtapes and street albums ===
Year	Album	Peak positions
Year	Album	FRA
2007	43eme Bima	–
2012	Z.E.R.O	141
2015	Double Fuck	1

=== Singles ===
Year	Single	Peak positions		Album
Year	Single	FRA	BEL (Wa)	Album
2013	"Zoo"	78	–	Or Noir
2013	"Binks"	51	–	Or Noir
2013	"Paradis ou enfer"	51	–	Or Noir
2014	"Sombre"	41	–	Or Noir Part II
2014	"Comme Gucci Mane"	34	–	Le bruit de mon âme
2014	"Se-Vrak"	165	–	Le bruit de mon âme
2014	"80 Zetrei"	25	45*(Ultratip)	Le bruit de mon âme
2015	"Le bruit de mon âme"	24	35*(Ultratip)	Le bruit de mon âme
2016	"Bambou"	155	–	Braqueurs soundtrack
2016	"Blow"	26	16*(Ultratip)	Okou Gnakouri
2016	"C'est pas pareil (Remix)" (with Seth Gueko)	184	–	
2017	"Dozo"	13	47	Dozo
2017	"Kébra"	32	13*(Ultratip)	Dozo
2017	"Bling Bling" (feat. Kalash Criminel and Sofiane)	74	3*(Ultratip)	Dozo
2018	"G.O.K.O.U"	19	19*(Ultratip)	
2018	"Aborigène"	70	–	
2018	"Livraison"	28	–	
2018	"Débrouillard"	49	–	Or Noir Part 3
2019	"Aieaieouille"	23	9*(Ultratip)	Or Noir Part 3
2019	"Omega"	71	–	
2020	"Goulag"	5	4*(Ultratip)	
2020	"NRV"	8	14*(Ultratip)	
2021	"Château noir"	8	–	
2021	"Hallyday"	96	–	
2022	"Apocalypse" (with Kalash Criminel featuring Freeze Corleone)	2	46	
2024	"Panama" (featuring Hamza)	7	29	

*Did not appear in the official Belgian Ultratop 50 charts, but rather in the bubbling under Ultratip charts.

=== Featured in ===
Year	Single	Peak positions	Album
Year	Single	FRA	Album
2012	"Kalash" (Booba feat. Kaaris)	116	Booba album Futur
2014	"La mort ou tchitchi" (Niro feat. Kaaris)	38	Niro album Miraculé
2015	"Bouteilles et glocks" (Dosseh feat. Kaaris)	38	Dosseh album Perestroïka
2016	"Arrêt du cœur" (Kalash Criminel & Kaaris)	61	Kalash Criminel album RAS
2018	"Mistigris" (Sofiane feat. Kaaris)	13	
2018	"GB" (Lartiste feat. Kaaris X DJ Mc Fly)	62	
2018	"Il se passe quoi" (Mac Tyer feat. Kaaris & Sofiane)	107	Mac Tyer album C'est la street mon pote
2019	"D'une autre manière" (Da Uzi feat. Kaaris)	101	Da Uzi album Mexico
2020	"Embourgeoisé " (Kofs feat. Kaaris)	90	Kofs album Santé & bonheur

=== Other charted songs ===
Year	Song	Peak positions		Album
Year	Song	FRA	BEL,small>(Wa)	Album
2013	"Dès le départ"	43	–	Or Noir
2013	"Or noir"	106	–	Or Noir
2013	"L.E.F" (feat. Booba)	122	–	Or Noir
2013	"63"	130	–	Or Noir
2013	"Bizon"	159	–	Or Noir
2013	"Je bibi"	168	–	Or Noir
2013	"Bouchon de Liège"	200	–	Or Noir
2014	"S.E.V.R.A.N"	26	–	Or Noir Part II
2014	"À l'heure"	27	–	Or Noir Part II
2014	"Chargé"	130	–	Or Noir Part II
2014	"Pablito"	182	–	Or Noir Part II
2015	"Crystal" (feat. Future)	19	–	Le bruit de mon âme
2015	"El Chapo" (feat. Lacrim)	123	–	Le bruit de mon âme
2015	"Zone de transit"	155	–	Le bruit de mon âme
2015	"Terrain"	65	–	Double Fuck
2015	"C'est la base" (feat. XV Barbar)	99	–	Double Fuck
2015	"Sinaloa"	141	–	Double Fuck
2015	"Talsadoum"	160	–	Double Fuck
2015	"Petit vélo"	169	–	Double Fuck
2015	"Où sont les €" (feat. SCH, Worms-T)	171	–	Double Fuck
2016	"Nador"	35	10* (Ultratip)	Okou Gnakouri
2016	"Poussière"	39	–	Okou Gnakouri
2016	"Tchoin"	7	40	Okou Gnakouri
2016	"4matic" (feat. Kalash Criminel)	141	–	Okou Gnakouri
2016	"2.7 Zéro 10. 17" (feat. Gucci Mane)	164	–	Okou Gnakouri
2016	"Contact"	183	–	Okou Gnakouri
2016	"Benz"	199	–	Okou Gnakouri
2017	"Je suis gninnin, je suis bien"	20	–	Dozo
2017	"Diarabi"	6	7*(Ultratip)	Dozo
2017	"Feghouli"	42	–	Dozo
2017	"Végéta"	61	–	Dozo
2017	"Oublier"	97	–	Dozo
2017	"Être deux"	90	–	Dozo
2017	"RPG"	125	–	Dozo
2017	"Courez"	144	–	Dozo
2017	"Victoire"	74	–	Dozo
2017	"Marchand d'ivoire"	62	–	Dozo
2017	"Menace"	67	–	Dozo
2017	"Mood"	84	–	Dozo
2017	"Pas idée"	83	–	Dozo
2018	"Rafaler" (with 4Keus Gang, Q.E Favelas & Mac Kregor)	131	–	93 Empire
2018	"Empire" (with Sofiane)	8	–	93 Empire
2018	"Nouvelle monnaie" (with Landy & Sofiane)	34	–	93 Empire
2018	"Pas le choix" (with Lartiste & Sofiane)	90	–	93 Empire
2019	"Cigarette" (feat. SCH)	12	–	Or Noir Part 3
2019	"Chien de la casse"	22	–	Or Noir Part 3
2019	"Gun Salute"	14	25*(Ultratip)	Or Noir Part 3
2019	"Golf7 R"	27	–	Or Noir Part 3
2019	"Briganté" (feat. Mac Tyer & Sofiane)	33	–	Or Noir Part 3
2019	"Dévalisé"	36	–	Or Noir Part 3
2019	"Monsieur Météo"	43	–	Or Noir Part 3
2019	"Octogone"	13	12*(Ultratip)	Or Noir Part 3
2019	"Détails"	70	–	Or Noir Part 3
2019	"Tout était écrit"	75	–	Or Noir Part 3
2019	"Ça on l'a"	85	–	Or Noir Part 3
2019	"Comme un refrain"	99	–	Or Noir Part 3
2019	"Douane"	106	–	Or Noir Part 3
2019	"Exo Planète"	59	–	Or Noir Part 3
2020	"Deux deux" (feat. Bosh)	9	–	2.7.0
2020	"Illimité"	12	–	2.7.0
2020	"Sosa"	19	–	2.7.0
2020	"Réussite"	22	–	2.7.0
2020	"Piquée" (feat. Dadju)	26	–	2.7.0
2020	"1er cœur" (feat. Gims)	32	–	2.7.0
2020	"Mandalorian"	34	–	2.7.0
2020	"Ultra"	38	–	2.7.0
2020	"Freestyle 2.7.0"	42	–	2.7.0
2020	"Lumière" (feat. Imen Es)	46	–	2.7.0
2020	"Moula moula"	65	–	2.7.0
2020	"Tout est prêt" (feat. Sid)	77	–	2.7.0
2020	"Guedro"	84	–	2.7.0
2020	"Bope"	100	–	2.7.0
2020	"Valhalla"	107	–	2.7.0
2020	"Big riska"	113	–	2.7.0

*Did not appear in the official Belgian Ultratop 50 charts, but rather in the bubbling under Ultratip charts.

== Filmography ==
=== Films ===
- Braqueurs (2015)
- Overdrive (2017)
- The Bouncer (2018)
- Bronx (2020)
- The King of Shadows (Netflix Film) (2023)
- The Gardener (2025)

=== Music videos ===
Year	Title	Director	Album
2007	Mets moi prem's	NC	43^{e} Bima
2009	De l'autre côté de la nuit (feat. Mac Kregor)	NC	NC
2009	Une armée de soucis	NC	NC
2010	Vendeur de Nah Nah (feat. Despo Rutti)	NC	NC
2010	Mafia Musik	NC	NC
2010	Ce que tu veux	NC	NC
2012	Houdini	NC	Z.E.R.O.
2012	L'Hôte funeste	NC	Z.E.R.O.
2012	Bon qu'à ça	NC	Z.E.R.O.
2012	Le Légiste	Chris Macari	Z.E.R.O.
2013	Zoo	Chris Macari	Or noir
2013	Binks	Chris Macari	Or noir
2013	Paradis ou enfer	Chris Macari	Or noir
2013	Dès le départ	Chris Macari	Or noir
2013	63	Chris Macari	Or noir
2013	Or noir	Greg Ohrel & Lionel Hirle	Or noir
2014	S.E.V.R.A.N	Nathalie Canguilhem	Or noir : Part II
2014	Se-Vrak	Nicolas Noël	Le bruit de mon âme
2014	Comme Gucci Mane	Julien Leclercq	Le bruit de mon âme
2014	80 Zetrei	DEKDEK	Le bruit de mon âme
2015	Mauvais Djo (feat. Ixzo, Worms T & Solo Le Mythe)	DEKDEK	Le bruit de mon âme
2015	Magnum	Amar Loudarenne	Le bruit de mon âme
2015	Le bruit de mon âme	DEKDEK	Le bruit de mon âme
2015	Crystal (feat. Future)	Nicolas Noël	Le bruit de mon âme
2015	Zone de transit	Nicolas Noël	Le bruit de mon âme
2015	Kadirov	Nicolas Noël	Le bruit de mon âme
2015	Terrain	Nicolas Noël	Double Fuck
2015	C'est la base (feat. XV Barbar)	Nicolas Noël	Double Fuck
2015	Sinaloa	Nicolas Noël	Double Fuck
2015	Talsadoum / Double Fuck	Carlos Guerra	Double Fuck
2016	Bambou	Kahina Carina	NC
2016	Blow	Cedrick Cayla	Okou Gnakouri
2016	Nador	Cedrick Cayla	Okou Gnakouri
2017	Dozo	Beat Bounce	Dozo
2017	Kébra	Chill	Dozo
2017	Bling Bling (feat. Sofiane & Kalash Criminel)	Cédrick Cayla	Dozo
2018	Diarabi	Cédrick Cayla	Dozo
2018	G.O.K.O.U	Cédrick Cayla	
