= Seth Gueko =

French rapper

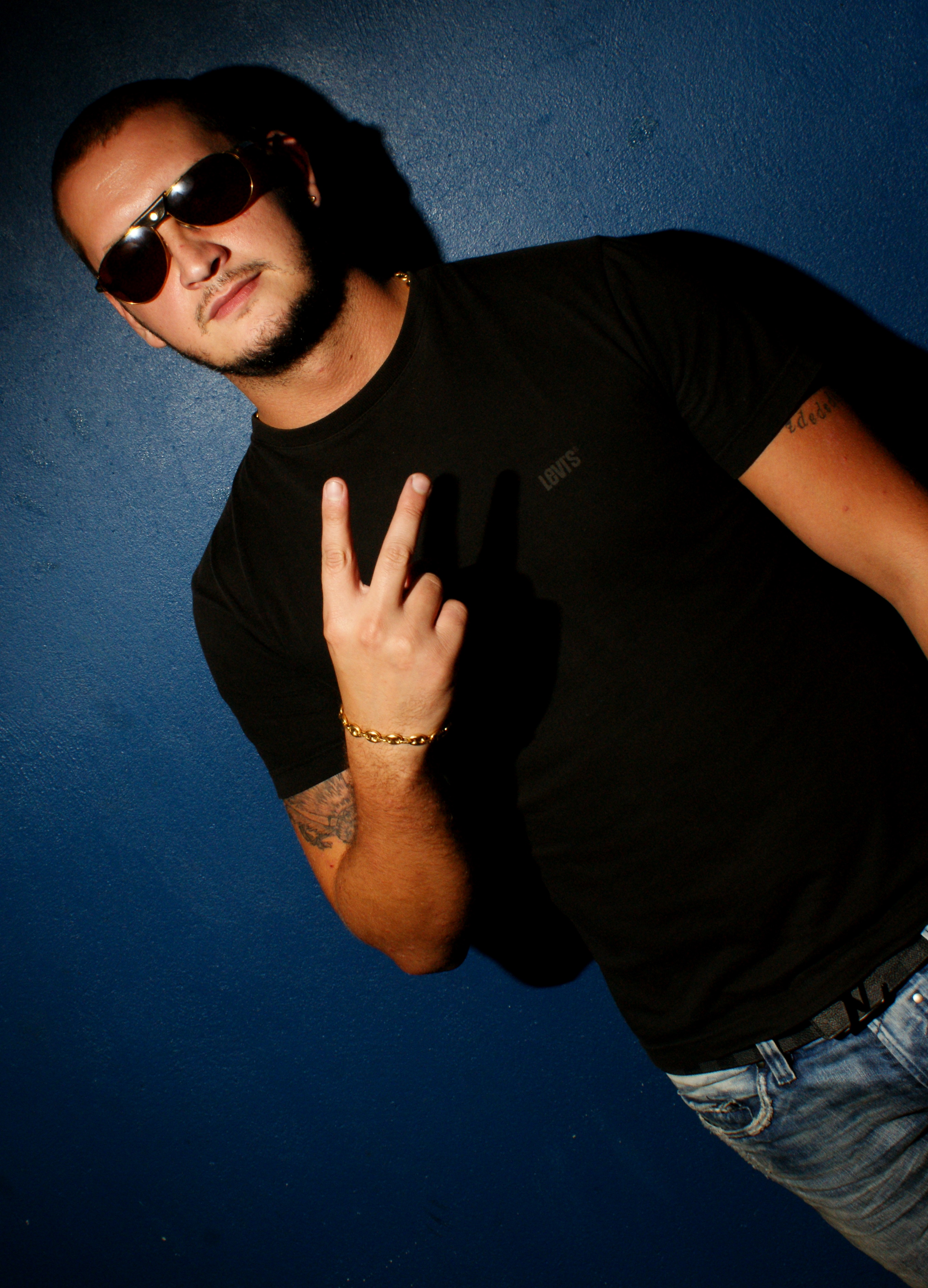

Background information
- Also known as: Barlou, Le Forain, Louis de Fitness, Professeur Punchline, Seth Guex, Shrek Gueko
- Born: Nicolas Salvadori; 27 October 1980 (age 45); Bordeaux, Merignac, France
- Genres: Hip hop, French rap
- Years active: 1998 – present
- Label: Néochrome

Nicolas Salvadori (French pronunciation: [nikɔla salvadɔʁi]; born 27 October 1980), better known by his stage name Seth Gueko (/ˈɡɛkoʊ/, French: [sɛt ɡeko]), is a French rapper. He has released two albums that have charted in France and a number of street albums and mixtapes.

== Career ==
Nicolas Salvadori was born in France of mixed Russian and Italian origin. He was discovered by independent rap label Néochrome in the early 2000s, appearing on Néochrome's compilation Néochrome Hall Stars Game featuring AlKpote and Zekwé Ramos, before releasing his first EP Mains Sales in 2004. He then worked on a number of EPs and street CDs with the Néochrome label before signing for EMI Music and later to East-West / Warner Music.

Seth Gueko's first studio album was "La Chevalière" on 4 May 2009 with Hostile Records, followed by the album "Michto" on 28 March 2011. On 6 May 2013, Gueko released album "Bad Cowboy".

== Style ==
Seth Gueko is well known for his skills in punchlines in his tracks full of references to various popular culture items. His emblematic track like "Shalom Salam Salut" is a reference to "Salut à toi", a famous track by alternative punk band Bérurier Noir. Track "Tapis moquette" has become a street anthem. His rap is also various linguistic influences using "parler banlieue", a contemporary Parisian lingo in addition to use of Romani (gypsy) languages (known as gitan), particularly "Manouche" of the nomadic Romani Tziganes, African lingala, Arabic language and also English language expressions. Using Verlan, a French argot in the French language, and a common slang language used by the youth featuring inversion of syllables in a word, many neologisms and onomatopoeia. His lyrics are full of humour and gimmicky phrases and newly invented words followed by fans. As influences he mentions popular French singer-songwriter Renaud, alternative punk band Bérurier Noir, French hip hop band 113 and French rock band Mano Negra.

He remains a vocal champion of the Romani community popularizing many of their expressions (bicrave, criave, bédave, michto, etc.) While imprisoned in 2010 for charges of voluntary violence, he met Mister You, eventually recording "Zoogatazblex (30 juin 2010)", talking about the day they met. The track is available on his album Michto. He doesn't escape from controversy calling himself. In his street album Le fils caché de Jack Mess' ( a hidden child of Jack Mess') is a reference to infamous criminal Jacques Mesrine. He also invited Dominique Alderweireld, allegedly involved in sexual scandals to appear on his music video "Dodo La Saumure" in reference to him. He is also popular on online social networks with his posts on Facebook, Twitter and Instagram with his fans known as Gueko Youth and ZdededeGirlz.

== Origin of name ==
His pseudonym is from the character Seth Gecko played by George Clooney in the 1996 film From Dusk till Dawn directed by Robert Rodriguez. In the song "A.K.A." taken from his album La Chevalière, he also mentions that he named himself "Guy Georges Clooney" which is a reference both to Clooney but also to Guy Georges, a serial killer. He utilized the title in "J'marche avec ma clique" that featured Despo Rutti and is a track on his album Patate de forain.

== Discography ==
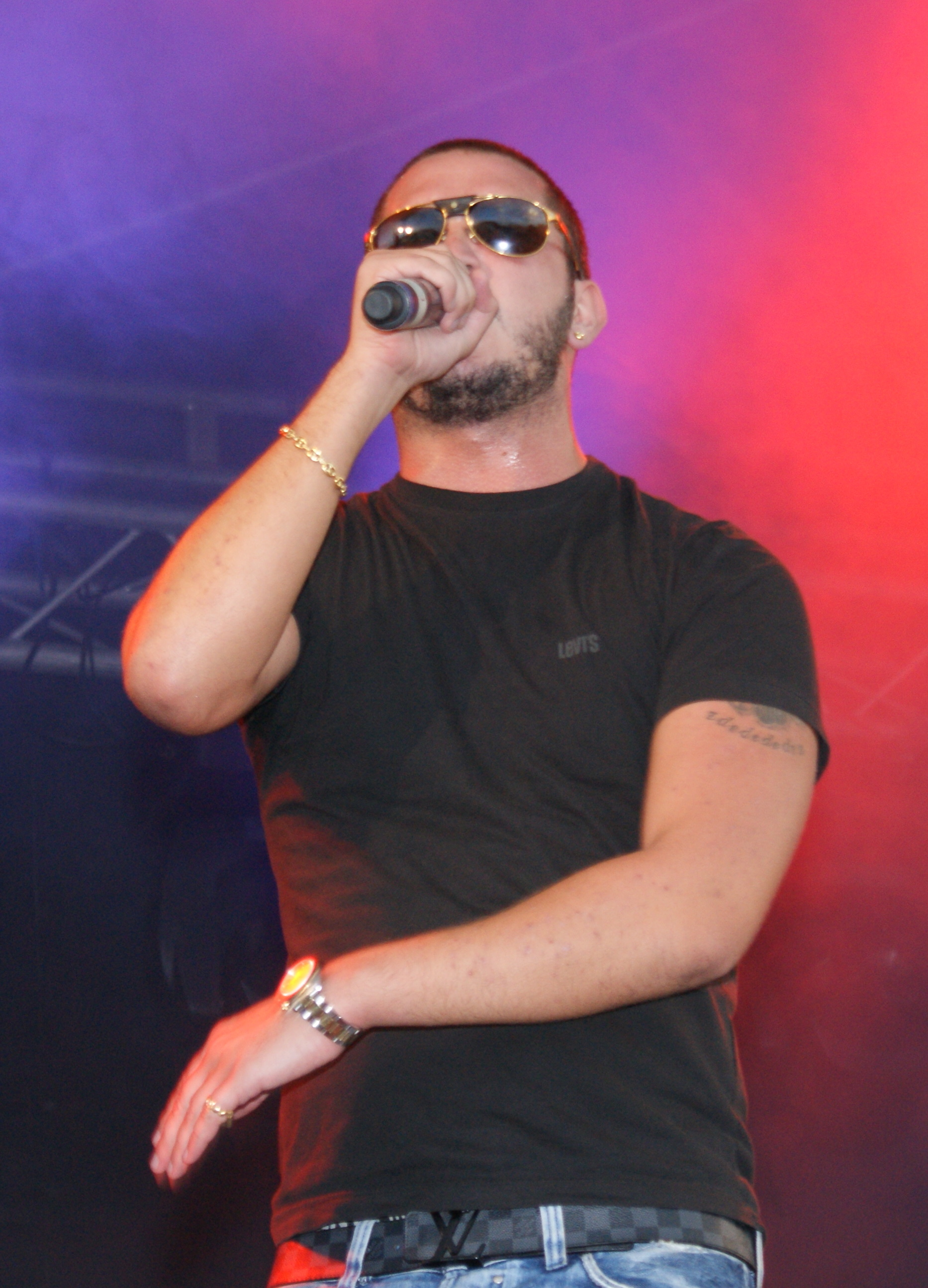
Seth Gueko live (2010)

=== Studio albums ===
Year	Album	Peak positions	
Year	Album	FRA	BEL (Wa)
2009	La chevalière	12	88
2011	Michto	11	45
2013	Bad Cowboy	1	53
2015	Professeur Punchline	12	45
2016	Barlou	27	65
2019	Destroy	10	29
2022	Mange tes morts	12	51

Others

- 2012: La chevalière / Les fils de Jack Mess (2CD package, reissue by EMI of earlier releases)

=== Maxi albums, street albums and mixtapes ===
Year	Title	Type	Peak positions
Year	Title	Type	FRA
2004	Mains sales	Maxi album	–
2007	Barillet plein	Street album	–
2007	Patate de forain	Mixtape	69
2008	Drive By en caravane	Street album	42
2008	Seth Gueko	Street album	–
2008	Les fils de Jack Mess	Mixtape	85

=== EPs ===
Year	EP	Peak positions	
Year	EP	FRA	BEL (Wa)
2021	Tel père tel fils (Seth Gueko & Stosba)	–	–

=== Singles ===
Year	Title	Peak positions	Album
Year	Title	FRA	Album
2013	"Paranoïak"	57	Bad Cowboy
2013	"Barbeuk"	—	Bad Cowboy
2015	"Val d'Oseille"	97	Professeur Punchline
2015	"Chintawaz" (featuring Gradur)	82	Professeur Punchline
2015	"Seth Gueko Bar"	187	Professeur Punchline
2015	"Titi Parisien"	38	Professeur Punchline
2017	"C'est pas pareil" (featuring Kaaris)	187	Barlou

Featured in

Year	Single	Charts	Certification	Album
Year	Single	FRA	Certification	Album
2017	"Grand Paris" (Médine feat. Lartiste, Lino, Sofiane, Alivor, Seth Gueko, Ninho & Youssoupha)	64		
