= List of top 10 singles in 2017 (France) =

This is a list of singles that have peaked in the top 10 of the French Singles Chart in 2017. 94 singles were in the Top 10 this year which 10 were on the number-one spot.

== Top 10 singles ==
Artist(s)	Single	Peak	Peak date	Ref.
Clean Bandit featuring Sean Paul and Anne-Marie	"Rockabye"	4	6 January	
The Weeknd featuring Daft Punk	"I Feel It Coming"	1	6 January	
Patrick Fiori	"Pour mieux s'aimer"	10	13 January	
Vianney	"Je m'en vais"	2	13 January	
Ed Sheeran	"Castle on the Hill"	3	13 January	
Ed Sheeran	"Shape of You"	1	13 January	
Gavin James	"Nervous (The Ooh Song)"	10	20 January	
Siboy and Booba	"Mula"	9	20 January	
KeBlack	"Bazardée"	8	20 January	
Burak Yeter featuring Danelle Sandoval	"Tuesday"	6	20 January	
Ryan Gosling and Emma Stone	"City of Stars"	9	3 February	
Lacrim	"Traîtres"	2	10 February	
Sia	"Helium"	10	17 February	
Jain	"Makeba"	7	17 February	
Zayn and Taylor Swift	"I Don't Wanna Live Forever"	4	17 February	
Eminem	"Lose Yourself"	9	24 February	
Lacrim	"Grande armée"	3	24 February	
MHD	"Afro Trap Part. 8 (Never)"	6	3 March	
Ofenbach	"Be Mine"	5	3 March	
Les Enfoirés	"Juste une p'tite chanson"	8	10 March	
Vitaa	"Peine & pitié"	3	10 March	
Petit Biscuit	"Sunset Lover"	6	17 March	
Kaleo	"Way Down We Go"	4	24 March	
Jax Jones featuring Raye	"You Don't Know Me"	6	31 March	
Lacrim and Booba	"Oh bah oui"	10	7 April	
Luna featuring Iyaz	"Run This Town"	8	7 April	
Loïc Nottet	"Million Eyes"	2	7 April	
Harry Styles	"Sign of the Times"	3	14 April	
Lady Gaga	"The Cure"	4	21 April	
Soprano	"Roule"	5	28 April	
Luis Fonsi featuring Daddy Yankee	"Despacito"	1	28 April	
Rohff	"Hors de contrôle"	4	5 May	
Lartiste featuring Awa Imani	"Chocolat"	3	5 May	
Dadju	"Reine"	9	12 May	
Alma	"Requiem"	5	19 May	
Salvador Sobral	"Amar pelos dois"	4	19 May	
Kygo and Selena Gomez	"It Ain't Me"	5	26 May	
Rag'n'Bone Man	"Skin"	4	26 May	
Enrique Iglesias featuring Descemer Bueno and Zion & Lennox	"Súbeme la Radio"	8	2 June	
Jason Derulo featuring Nicki Minaj and Ty Dolla Sign	"Swalla"	5	2 June	
Katy Perry featuring Skip Marley	"Chained to the Rhythm"	3	9 June	
Katy Perry featuring Migos	"Bon Appétit"	9	16 June	
David Guetta featuring Justin Bieber	"2U"	3	16 June	
Indochine	"La vie est belle"	1	16 June	
DJ Khaled featuring Rihanna and Bryson Tiller	"Wild Thoughts"	2	23 June	
Louane	"On était beau"	9	30 June	
Imagine Dragons	"Believer"	7	7 July	
Lacrim and Maître Gims	"Ce soir ne sors pas"	8	14 July	
Booba	"Nougat"	2	14 July	
Bengous	"Tié la famille !"	7	21 July	
The Chainsmokers and Coldplay	"Something Just like This"	6	21 July	
Linkin Park	"Numb"	9	28 July	
Julia Michaels	"Issues"	7	4 August	
Charlie Puth	"Attention"	3	4 August	
Robin Schulz featuring James Blunt	"OK"	8	18 August	
Justin Bieber and BloodPop	"Friends"	8	25 August	
Sena Kana	"Live Yours Dreams"	4	25 August	
Niska	"Réseaux"	3	25 August	
French Montana featuring Swae Lee	"Unforgettable"	9	1 September	
Taylor Swift	"Look What You Made Me Do"	4	1 September	
Calogero	"Je joue de la musique"	2	1 September	
MC Solaar	"Sonotone"	3	8 September	
Calvin Harris featuring Pharrell Williams, Katy Perry and Big Sean	"Feels"	1	8 September	
Alice Merton	"No Roots"	1	22 September	
Slimane	"Viens on s'aime"	9	29 September	
Niska featuring Booba	"Tuba Life"	8	29 September	
Portugal. The Man	"Feel It Still"	3	29 September	
J Balvin and Willy William	"Mi Gente"	10	6 October	
Rohff	"Broly"	7	6 October	
Naughty Boy featuring Beyoncé and Arrow Benjamin	"Runnin' (Lose It All)"	1	6 October	
Bertrand Cantat	"L'Angleterre"	10	13 October	
Jessy Matador	"Mi Amore"	8	13 October	
Kalash featuring Damso	"Mwaka Moon"	1	13 October	
Pink	"What About Us"	2	20 October	
Ofenbach vs. Nick Waterhouse	"Katchi"	1	20 October	
Orelsan	"Basique"	9	27 October	
Post Malone featuring 21 Savage	"Rockstar"	8	27 October	
Zayn featuring Sia	"Dusk Till Dawn"	2	3 November	
Sam Smith	"Too Good at Goodbyes"	6	10 November	
Ed Sheeran	"Perfect"	1	10 November	
Maître Gims	"Caméléon"	7	17 November	
Louane	"Si t'étais là"	2	24 November	
Camila Cabello featuring Young Thug	"Havana"	2	1 December	
Johnny Hallyday	"Que je t'aime"	7	8 December	
Johnny Hallyday	"Diego, libre dans sa tête"	6	8 December	
Johnny Hallyday	"Je te promets"	1	8 December	
Johnny Hallyday	"Allumer le feu"	10	15 December	
Johnny Hallyday	"Sang pour sang"	9	15 December	
Johnny Hallyday	"Marie"	8	15 December	
Johnny Hallyday	"Requiem pour un fou"	5	15 December	
Johnny Hallyday	"Vivre pour le meilleur"	4	15 December	
Johnny Hallyday	"Quelque chose de Tennessee"	3	15 December	
Johnny Hallyday	"L'Envie"	2	15 December	
Agustín Galiana	"Carmina"	8	22 December	

== Entries by artists ==
The following table shows artists who achieved two or more top 10 entries in 2017. The figures include both main artists and featured artists and the peak position in brackets.

Entries	Artist	Songs
10	Johnny Hallyday	"Je te promets" (1), "L'Envie" (2), "Quelque chose de Tennessee" (3), "Vivre pour le meilleur" (4), "Requiem pour un fou" (5), "Diego, libre dans sa tête" (6), "Que je t'aime" (7), "Marie" (8), "Sang pour sang" (9), "Allumer le feu" (10)
4	Booba	"Mula" (9), "Oh bah oui" (10), "Nougat" (2), "Tuba Life" (8)
4	Lacrim	"Traîtres" (2), "Grande armée" (3), "Ce soir ne sors pas" (8), "Oh bah oui" (10)
3	Ed Sheeran	"Castle on the Hill" (3), "Shape of You" (1), "Perfect" (1)
3	Katy Perry	"Bon Appétit" (9), "Chained to the Rhythm" (3), "Feels" (1)
2	Justin Bieber	"2U" (3), "Friends" (8)
2	Louane	"On était beau" (9), "Si t'étais là" (2)
2	Maître Gims	"Ce sois ne sors pas" (8), "Caméléon" (7)
2	Niska	"Réseaux" (3), "Tuba Life" (8)
2	Ofenbach	"Be Mine" (5), "Katchi" (1)
2	Rohff	"Hors de contrôle" (4), "Broly" (7),
2	Sia	"Helium" (10), "Dusk Till Dawn" (2)
2	Taylor Swift	"I Don't Wanna Live Forever" (4), "Look What You Made Me Do" (4)
2	Zayn Malik	"I Don't Wanna Live Forever" (4), "Dusk Till Dawn" (2)

== See also ==
- 2017 in music
- List of number-one hits of 2017 (France)
