= List of number-one hits of 2019 (France) =

This is a list of the French SNEP Top 200 Singles and Top 200 Albums number-ones of 2019.

== Number ones by week ==
=== Singles chart ===
Week	Issue date	Download + Streaming		
Week	Issue date	Artist(s)	Title	Ref.
1	4 January	Angèle featuring Roméo Elvis	"Tout oublier"	
2	11 January	Angèle featuring Roméo Elvis	"Tout oublier"	
3	18 January	Bramsito featuring Booba	"Sale Mood"	
4	25 January	Eva featuring Lartiste	"On Fleek"	
5	1 February	Booba	"PGP"	
6	8 February	Heuss l'Enfoiré featuring Sofiane	"Khapta"	
7	15 February	Heuss l'Enfoiré featuring Sofiane	"Khapta"	
8	22 February	Heuss l'Enfoiré featuring Sofiane	"Khapta"	
9	1 March	Ninho	"Goutte d'eau"	
10	8 March	Ninho	"Goutte d'eau"	
11	15 March	Ninho	"Goutte d'eau"	
12	22 March	Ninho	"Goutte d'eau"	
13	29 March	PNL	"Au DD"	
14	5 April	PNL	"Au DD"	
15	12 April	PNL	"Au DD"	
16	19 April	PNL	"Au DD"	
17	26 April	PNL	"Au DD"	
18	3 May	PNL	"Au DD"	
19	10 May	PNL	"Au DD"	
20	17 May	Niska featuring Booba	"Médicament"	
21	24 May	Booba	"Arc-en-Ciel"	
22	31 May	Lil Nas X	"Old Town Road"	
23	7 June	Lil Nas X	"Old Town Road"	
24	14 June	Nekfeu featuring Damso	"Tricheur"	
25	21 June	Nekfeu featuring Damso	"Tricheur"	
26	28 June	Lil Nas X	"Old Town Road"	
27	5 July	Lil Nas X	"Old Town Road"	
28	12 July	Lil Nas X	"Old Town Road"	
29	19 July	Lil Nas X	"Old Town Road"	
30	26 July	Lil Nas X	"Old Town Road"	
31	2 August	DJ Snake and J Balvin featuring Tyga	"Loco Contigo"	
32	9 August	Lil Nas X	"Old Town Road"	
33	16 August	Moha La Squale	"Ma belle"	
34	23 August	Moha La Squale	"Ma belle"	
35	30 August	Moha La Squale	"Ma belle"	
36	6 September	Moha La Squale	"Ma belle"	
37	13 September	Niska featuring Ninho	"Méchant"	
38	20 September	PLK	"Un peu de haine"	
39	27 September	Gambi	"Hé oh"	
40	4 October	Gambi	"Hé oh"	
41	11 October	Gambi	"Popopop"	
42	18 October	Gambi	"Popopop"	
43	25 October	Gambi	"Popopop"	
44	1 November	Gambi	"Popopop"	
45	8 November	Gambi	"Popopop"	
46	15 November	Tones and I	"Dance Monkey"	
47	22 November	Tones and I	"Dance Monkey"	
48	29 November	Gradur featuring Heuss l'Enfoiré	"Ne reviens pas"	
49	6 December	Gradur featuring Heuss l'Enfoiré	"Ne reviens pas"	
50	13 December	Gradur featuring Heuss l'Enfoiré	"Ne reviens pas"	
51	20 December	Gradur featuring Heuss l'Enfoiré	"Ne reviens pas"	
52	27 December	Gradur featuring Heuss l'Enfoiré	"Ne reviens pas"	

=== Albums chart ===
Week	Issue date	Artist(s)	Album	Ref.
1	4 January	Johnny Hallyday	Mon pays c'est l'amour	
2	11 January	Johnny Hallyday	Mon pays c'est l'amour	
3	18 January	Lomepal	Jeannine	
4	25 January	Lomepal	Jeannine	
5	1 February	M	Lettre infinie	
6	8 February	M	Lettre infinie	
7	15 February	Lacrim	Lacrim	
8	22 February	Angèle	Brol	
9	1 March	Lady Gaga and Bradley Cooper	A Star Is Born	
10	8 March	Lady Gaga and Bradley Cooper	A Star Is Born	
11	15 March	Les Enfoirés	Le monde des Enfoirés	
12	22 March	Les Enfoirés	Le monde des Enfoirés	
13	29 March	Ninho	Destin	
14	5 April	Ninho	Destin	
15	12 April	PNL	Deux frères	
16	19 April	M. Pokora	Pyramide	
17	26 April	PNL	Deux frères	
18	3 May	PNL	Deux frères	
19	10 May	PNL	Deux frères	
20	17 May	PNL	Deux frères	
21	24 May	Rammstein	Rammstein	
22	31 May	Ninho	Destin	
23	7 June	Ninho	Destin	
24	14 June	Nekfeu	Les étoiles vagabondes (including Expansion)	
25	21 June	Nekfeu	Les étoiles vagabondes (including Expansion)	
26	28 June	Nekfeu	Les étoiles vagabondes (including Expansion)	
27	5 July	Nekfeu	Les étoiles vagabondes (including Expansion)	
28	12 July	Nekfeu	Les étoiles vagabondes (including Expansion)	
29	19 July	Nekfeu	Les étoiles vagabondes (including Expansion)	
30	26 July	Nekfeu	Les étoiles vagabondes (including Expansion)	
31	2 August	Nekfeu	Les étoiles vagabondes (including Expansion)	
32	9 August	Nekfeu	Les étoiles vagabondes (including Expansion)	
33	16 August	Nekfeu	Les étoiles vagabondes (including Expansion)	
34	23 August	Nekfeu	Les étoiles vagabondes (including Expansion)	
35	30 August	Lorenzo	Sex in the City	
36	6 September	Jean-Baptiste Guégan	Puisque c'est écrit	
37	13 September	Niska	Mr Sal	
38	20 September	Niska	Mr Sal	
39	27 September	Niska	Mr Sal	
40	4 October	Niska	Mr Sal	
41	11 October	Niska	Mr Sal	
42	18 October	Vald	Ce monde est cruel	
43	25 October	Mylène Farmer	Live 2019	
44	1 November	Johnny Hallyday	Johnny	
45	8 November	Johnny Hallyday	Johnny	
46	15 November	Jacques Dutronc, Johnny Hallyday and Eddy Mitchell	Les vieilles canailles: L'album live	
47	22 November	Dadju	Poison ou antidote	
48	29 November	Coldplay	Everyday Life	
49	6 December	Renaud	Les mômes et les enfants d'abord	
50	13 December	Jul	C'est pas des LOL	
51	20 December	Jacques Dutronc, Johnny Hallyday and Eddy Mitchell	Les vieilles canailles: L'album live	
52	27 December	Jacques Dutronc, Johnny Hallyday and Eddy Mitchell	Les vieilles canailles: L'album live	

== See also ==
- 2019 in music
- List of number-one singles in France
- List of top 10 singles in 2019 (France)
