= List of top 10 singles in 2019 (France) =

This is a list of singles that have peaked in the top 10 of the French Singles Chart in 2019. 80 singles were in the Top 10 this year which 10 were on the number-one spot.

== Top 10 singles ==
Artist(s)	Single	Peak	Peak date	Ref.
David Guetta, Bebe Rexha and J Balvin	"Say My Name"	8	4 January	
Bilal Hassani	"Roi"	7	11 January	
Eva featuring Lartiste	"On Fleek"	3	18 January	
Ava Max	"Sweet but Psycho"	6	25 January	
Ariana Grande	"7 Rings"	3	25 January	
Nehuda	"Comment te dire"	10	1 February	
Michel Legrand	"Les moulins de mon coeur"	6	1 February	
Booba	"PGP"	2	1 February	
Angèle featuring Roméo Elvis	"Tout oublier"	3	8 February	
Panic! at the Disco	"High Hopes"	10	22 February	
Talk Talk	"Such a Shame"	6	1 March	
Jonas Brothers	"Sucker"	10	8 March	
Calvin Harris and Rag'n'Bone Man	"Giant"	6	8 March	
Les Enfoirés	"On trace"	8	15 March	
Eva	"Bella"	10	22 March	
Mark Ronson featuring Miley Cyrus	"Nothing Breaks Like a Heart"	8	22 March	
Gims	"Miami Vice"	5	22 March	
Saez	"Les enfants paradis"	3	22 March	
Daddy Yankee featuring Snow	"Con Calma"	8	29 March	
Imagine Dragons	"Bad Liar"	7	29 March	
PNL	"Au DD"	1	29 March	
Rammstein	"Deutschland"	4	5 April	
Niska featuring Booba	"Médicament"	3	12 April	
Lady Gaga	"Always Remember Us This Way"	1	12 April	
BTS featuring Halsey	"Boy with Luv"	8	19 April	
M. Pokora	"Les planètes"	3	19 April	
Angèle	"Balance ton quoi"	1	26 April	
Taylor Swift featuring Brendon Urie	"Me!"	4	3 May	
Slimane and Vitaa	"VersuS"	7	10 May	
Lauren Daigle	"You Say"	6	10 May	
Pedro Capó and Farruko	"Calma"	3	10 May	
Ed Sheeran and Justin Bieber	"I Don't Care"	1	17 May	
Booba	"Arc-en-ciel"	9	24 May	
Duncan Laurence	"Arcade"	8	24 May	
Lizzo	"Juice"	9	31 May	
The Avener featuring Bipolar Sunshine	"Beautiful"	5	31 May	
Katy Perry	"Never Really Over"	8	7 June	
PNL	"MOWGLI II"	1	7 June	
Nekfeu featuring Damso	"Tricheur"	6	14 June	
Kezah featuring Freddy Gladieux and Squeezie	"Mirador"	6	21 June	
Clara Luciani	"La grenade"	1	21 June	
Aya Nakamura	"Pookie"	7	28 June	
Stardust	"Music Sounds Better with You"	9	5 July	
Celine Dion	"Flying on My Own"	8	5 July	
Lil Nas X featuring Billy Ray Cyrus	"Old Town Road"	1	5 July	
PNL	"Sibérie"	10	12 July	
PNL	"Ryuk"	7	12 July	
PNL	"Bang"	6	12 July	
PNL	"Comme pas deux"	4	12 July	
Johnny Clegg and Juluka	"Scatterlings of Africa"	8	19 July	
Johnny Clegg and Savuka	"Asimbonanga (Mandela)"	2	19 July	
Billie Eilish	"Bad Guy"	2	26 July	
Shawn Mendes and Camila Cabello	"Señorita"	1	26 July	
Soprano featuring Vincenzo	"Le coach"	5	16 August	
DJ Snake and J Balvin featuring Tyga	"Loco Contigo"	2	16 August	
Lewis Capaldi	"Someone You Loved"	4	23 August	
Indila	"Parle à ta tête"	2	30 August	
Sia	"Unstoppable"	2	6 September	
Tones and I	"Dance Monkey"	1	13 September	
Ariana Grande, Miley Cyrus and Lana Del Rey	"Don't Call Me Angel"	7	20 September	
Lum!x and Gabry Ponte	"Monster"	10	27 September	
Ava Max	"Torn"	10	4 October	
J-Hope featuring Becky G	"Chicken Noodle Soup"	7	4 October	
Jenifer featuring Kylie Minogue	"On oublie le reste"	9	11 October	
Gambi	"Popopop"	4	11 October	
Gims and Sting	"Reste"	2	11 October	
Angèle	"Perdus"	10	18 October	
Imagine Dragons	"Birds"	7	18 October	
Vitaa and Slimane	"Ça va ça vient"	3	18 October	
Selena Gomez	"Lose You to Love Me"	8	25 October	
Johnny Hallyday	"Diego, libre dans sa tête"	3	1 November	
Regard	"Ride It"	2	1 November	
Marie Laforêt	"Il a neigé sur yesterday"	5	8 November	
Dua Lipa	"Don't Start Now"	2	8 November	
M. Pokora	"Tombé"	4	15 November	
Angèle	"Oui ou non"	2	15 November	
Soprano	"À nos héros du quotidien"	5	22 November	
Maroon 5	"Memories"	3	22 November	
Gradur featuring Heuss l'Enfoiré	"Ne reviens pas"	3	6 December	
The Weeknd	"Blinding Lights"	1	20 December	

== Entries by artists ==
The following table shows artists who achieved two or more top 10 entries in 2019. The figures include both main artists and featured artists and the peak position in brackets.

Entries	Artist	Singles
6	PNL	"Au DD" (1), "MOWGLI II" (1), "Sibérie" (10), "RYUK" (7), "Comme pas deux" (4), "Bang" (6)
4	Angèle	"Tout oublier" (3), "Balance ton quoi" (1), "Perdus" (10), "Oui ou non" (2)
3	Booba	"PGP" (2), "Médicament" (3), "Arc-en-ciel" (9)
2	Ariana Grande	"7 Rings" (3), "Don't Call Me Angel" (7)
2	Ava Max	"Sweet but Psycho" (6), "Torn" (10)
2	Eva	"On Fleek" (3), "Bella" (10),
2	Gims	"Miami Vice" (5), "Reste" (2)
2	Imagine Dragons	"Bad Liar" (7), "Birds" (7)
2	J Balvin	"Say My Name" (8), "Loco Contigo" (2)
2	Johnny Clegg	"Asimbonanga (Mandela)" (2), "Scatterlings of Africa" (8)
2	Miley Cyrus	"Nothing Breaks Like a Heart" (8), "Don't Call Me Angel" (7)
2	M. Pokora	"Les planètes" (3), "Tombé" (4)
2	Soprano	"Le coach" (5), "À nos héros du quotidien" (5)
2	Slimane	"VersuS" (7), "Ça va ça vient" (3)
2	Vitaa	"VersuS" (7), "Ça va ça vient" (3)

== See also ==
- 2019 in music
- List of number-one hits of 2019 (France)
