= List of number-one hits of 2017 (France) =

This is a list of the French SNEP Top 200 Singles and Top 200 Albums number-ones of 2017.

== Number ones by week ==
=== Singles chart ===
Week	Issue date	Download			Streaming		
Week	Issue date	Artist(s)	Title	Ref.	Artist(s)	Title	Ref.
1	6 January	The Weeknd featuring Daft Punk	"I Feel It Coming"		Nekfeu	"Mauvaise graine"	
2	13 January	Ed Sheeran	"Shape of You"		Ed Sheeran	"Shape of You"	
3	20 January	Ed Sheeran	"Shape of You"		Ed Sheeran	"Shape of You"	
4	27 January	Ed Sheeran	"Shape of You"		Ed Sheeran	"Shape of You"	
5	3 February	Ed Sheeran	"Shape of You"		Ed Sheeran	"Shape of You"	
6	10 February	Ed Sheeran	"Shape of You"		Ed Sheeran	"Shape of You"	
7	17 February	Ed Sheeran	"Shape of You"		Ed Sheeran	"Shape of You"	
8	24 February	Ed Sheeran	"Shape of You"		Ed Sheeran	"Shape of You"	
9	3 March	Ed Sheeran	"Shape of You"		Ed Sheeran	"Shape of You"	
10	10 March	Ed Sheeran	"Shape of You"		Ed Sheeran	"Shape of You"	
11	17 March	Ed Sheeran	"Shape of You"		Ed Sheeran	"Shape of You"	
12	24 March	Ed Sheeran	"Shape of You"		Ed Sheeran	"Shape of You"	
13	31 March	Ed Sheeran	"Shape of You"		Ed Sheeran	"Shape of You"	
14	7 April	Ed Sheeran	"Shape of You"		Ed Sheeran	"Shape of You"	
15	14 April	Ed Sheeran	"Shape of You"		Ed Sheeran	"Shape of You"	
16	21 April	Ed Sheeran	"Shape of You"		Ed Sheeran	"Shape of You"	
17	28 April	Luis Fonsi featuring Daddy Yankee	"Despacito"		Ed Sheeran	"Shape of You"	
18	5 May	Luis Fonsi featuring Daddy Yankee	"Despacito"		Luis Fonsi featuring Daddy Yankee	"Despacito"	
19	12 May	Luis Fonsi featuring Daddy Yankee	"Despacito"		Luis Fonsi featuring Daddy Yankee	"Despacito"	
20	19 May	Luis Fonsi featuring Daddy Yankee	"Despacito"		Luis Fonsi featuring Daddy Yankee	"Despacito"	
21	26 May	Luis Fonsi featuring Daddy Yankee	"Despacito"		Luis Fonsi featuring Daddy Yankee	"Despacito"	
22	2 June	Luis Fonsi featuring Daddy Yankee	"Despacito"		Luis Fonsi featuring Daddy Yankee	"Despacito"	
23	9 June	Luis Fonsi featuring Daddy Yankee	"Despacito"		Luis Fonsi featuring Daddy Yankee	"Despacito"	
24	16 June	Indochine	"La vie est belle"		Luis Fonsi featuring Daddy Yankee	"Despacito"	
25	23 June	Luis Fonsi featuring Daddy Yankee and Justin Bieber	"Despacito"		Luis Fonsi featuring Daddy Yankee	"Despacito"	
26	30 June	Luis Fonsi featuring Daddy Yankee and Justin Bieber	"Despacito"		Luis Fonsi featuring Daddy Yankee	"Despacito"	
27	7 July	Luis Fonsi featuring Daddy Yankee and Justin Bieber	"Despacito"		Luis Fonsi featuring Daddy Yankee	"Despacito"	
28	14 July	Luis Fonsi featuring Daddy Yankee and Justin Bieber	"Despacito"		Luis Fonsi featuring Daddy Yankee	"Despacito"	
29	21 July	Luis Fonsi featuring Daddy Yankee and Justin Bieber	"Despacito"		Luis Fonsi featuring Daddy Yankee	"Despacito"	
30	28 July	Luis Fonsi featuring Daddy Yankee and Justin Bieber	"Despacito"		Niska	"Réseaux"	
31	4 August	Luis Fonsi featuring Daddy Yankee and Justin Bieber	"Despacito"		Niska	"Réseaux"	
32	11 August	Luis Fonsi featuring Daddy Yankee and Justin Bieber	"Despacito"		Niska	"Réseaux"	
33	18 August	Luis Fonsi featuring Daddy Yankee and Justin Bieber	"Despacito"		Niska	"Réseaux"	
34	25 August	Luis Fonsi featuring Daddy Yankee and Justin Bieber	"Despacito"		Niska	"Réseaux"	
35	1 September	Luis Fonsi featuring Daddy Yankee and Justin Bieber	"Despacito"		Niska	"Réseaux"	
36	8 September	Calvin Harris featuring Pharrell Williams, Katy Perry and Big Sean	"Feels"		Niska	"Réseaux"	
37	15 September	Calvin Harris featuring Pharrell Williams, Katy Perry and Big Sean	"Feels"		Ninho featuring Nekfeu	"De l'autre côté"	
38	22 September	Alice Merton	"No Roots"		Niska	"Réseaux"	
39	29 September	Alice Merton	"No Roots"		Niska	"Réseaux"	
40	6 October	Naughty Boy featuring Beyoncé and Arrow Benjamin	"Runnin' (Lose It All)"		Niska	"Réseaux"	
41	13 October	Kalash featuring Damso	"Mwaka Moon"		Kalash featuring Damso	"Mwaka Moon"	
42	20 October	Ofenbach vs. Nick Waterhouse	"Katchi"		Kalash featuring Damso	"Mwaka Moon"	
43	27 October	Ofenbach vs. Nick Waterhouse	"Katchi"		Kalash featuring Damso	"Mwaka Moon"	
44	3 November	Ofenbach vs. Nick Waterhouse	"Katchi"		Kalash featuring Damso	"Mwaka Moon"	
45	10 November	Ed Sheeran	"Perfect"		Kalash featuring Damso	"Mwaka Moon"	
46	17 November	Ofenbach vs. Nick Waterhouse	"Katchi"		Kalash featuring Damso	"Mwaka Moon"	
47	24 November	Ed Sheeran	"Perfect"		Kalash featuring Damso	"Mwaka Moon"	
48	1 December	Ed Sheeran	"Perfect"		Kalash featuring Damso	"Mwaka Moon"	
49	8 December	Johnny Hallyday	"Je te promets"		Booba	"Petite fille"	
50	15 December	Johnny Hallyday	"Je te promets"		Booba	"Petite fille"	
51	22 December	Ed Sheeran	"Perfect"		Kalash featuring Damso	"Mwaka Moon"	
52	29 December	Ed Sheeran	"Perfect"		Kalash featuring Damso	"Mwaka Moon"	

=== Albums chart ===
Week	Issue date	Artist(s)	Album	Ref.
1	6 January	M. Pokora	My Way	
2	13 January	Vianney	Vianney	
3	20 January	M. Pokora	My Way	
4	27 January	Vald	Agartha	
5	3 February	Vianney	Vianney	
6	10 February	Vianney	Vianney	
7	17 February	Vianney	Vianney	
8	24 February	Vianney	Vianney	
9	3 March	Rag'n'Bone Man	Human	
10	10 March	Les Enfoirés	Mission Enfoirés	
11	17 March	Les Enfoirés	Mission Enfoirés	
12	24 March	Depeche Mode	Spirit	
13	31 March	Ed Sheeran	÷	
14	7 April	Lacrim	Force & Honneur	
15	14 April	Lacrim	Force & Honneur	
16	21 April	Lacrim	Force & Honneur	
17	28 April	Lacrim	Force & Honneur	
18	5 May	Damso	Ipséité	
19	12 May	SCH	Deo Favente	
20	19 May	Damso	Ipséité	
21	26 May	Mister V	Double V	
22	2 June	Damso	Ipséité	
23	9 June	Damso	Ipséité	
24	16 June	Gauvain Sers	Pourvu	
25	23 June	Damso	Ipséité	
26	30 June	Bigflo & Oli	La vraie vie	
27	7 July	Jul	Je ne me vois pas briller	
28	14 July	Keen'V	7	
29	21 July	Jul	Je ne me vois pas briller	
30	28 July	Celine Dion	Un peu de nous	
31	4 August	Celine Dion	Un peu de nous	
32	11 August	Celine Dion	Un peu de nous	
33	18 August	Jul	Je ne me vois pas briller	
34	25 August	Kids United	Forever United	
35	1 September	Calogero	Liberté chérie	
36	8 September	Calogero	Liberté chérie	
37	15 September	Indochine	13	
38	22 September	Ninho	Comme prévu	
39	29 September	Niska	Commando	
40	6 October	Niska	Commando	
41	13 October	Niska	Commando	
42	20 October	Niska	Commando	
43	27 October	Orelsan	La fête est finie	
44	3 November	Orelsan	La fête est finie	
45	10 November	Orelsan	La fête est finie	
46	17 November	Louane	Louane	
47	24 November	Lacrim	R.I.P.R.O 3	
48	1 December	Dadju	Gentleman 2.0	
49	8 December	Various artists	On a tous quelque chose de Johnny	
50	15 December	Various artists	On a tous quelque chose de Johnny	
51	22 December	Ed Sheeran	÷	
52	29 December	Ed Sheeran	÷	

== See also ==
- 2017 in music
- List of number-one singles in France
- List of top 10 singles in 2017 (France)
