= On Fleek =

On fleek may refer to:

- "On Fleek" (song), a 2019 song by French singer Eva
- "On Fleek", a song by Offset from his 2019 album Father of 4
- "On Fleek", a 2020 song by Yella Beezy

== See also ==
- Fleek, a surname
- "Eyebrows on fleek", a phrase popularized in a Vine internet meme
