= Grande armée (song) =

2017 single by Lacrim

Single by Lacrim

from the album Force & Honneur
- Released: 2017
- Genre: French rap
- Length: 3:52
- Songwriter(s): Karim Zenoud; DJ Bellek
- Producer(s): The Ghost

Lacrim singles chronology
"Traîtres" (2017)	"Grande armée" (2017)	"Oh bah oui" (2017)

"Grande armée" is a song by French rapper Lacrim. It peaked at number two in France.

== Charts ==
=== Weekly charts ===
Chart performance for "Grande armée"
Chart (2017)	Peak position
Belgium (Ultratop 50 Wallonia)	35
France (SNEP)	2
Switzerland (Schweizer Hitparade)	60

=== Year-end charts ===
Year-end chart performance for "Grande armée"
Chart (2017)	Position
France (SNEP)	94

== Certifications ==
Region	Certification	Certified units/sales
France (SNEP)	Platinum	133,333^{‡}
^{‡} Sales+streaming figures based on certification alone.
