= Hé oh =

2019 single by Gambi

Single by Gambi

from the album La vie est belle
- Released: 2019
- Recorded: 2019
- Genre: French rap, trap
- Length: 3:11
- Label: Rec. 118
- Songwriters: Ace Looky; Gambi; Neuroz

Gambi singles chronology
"Oulalah" (2019)	"Hé oh" (2019)	"Popopop" (2019)

Music video
- "Hé oh" on YouTube

"Hé oh" is a song by French rapper Gambi that was released in 2019. The song topped the singles chart in France and was Gambi's first single to reach number one.

== Charts ==
Chart performance for "Hé oh"
Chart (2019)	Peak position
Belgium Urban (Ultratop Flanders)	43
Belgium (Ultratop 50 Wallonia)	13
France (SNEP)	1
Switzerland (Schweizer Hitparade)	43

== Certifications ==
Region	Certification	Certified units/sales
France (SNEP)	Diamond	333,333^{‡}
^{‡} Sales+streaming figures based on certification alone.
