= Popopop =

2019 single by Gambi

Single by Gambi

from the album La vie est belle
- Released: 4 October 2019
- Length: 3:06
- Label: Rec. 118
- Songwriters: Ghost Killer Track; Gambi
- Producers: Ghost Killer Track; Ibø

Gambi singles chronology
"Hé oh" (2019)	"Popopop" (2019)	"Dans l'espace" (2020)

Music video
- "Popopop" on YouTube

"Popopop" is a song by French rapper Gambi, released on 4 October 2019. The song topped the singles chart in France.

== Charts ==
=== Weekly charts ===
Chart performance for "Popopop"
Chart (2019)	Peak position
Belgium (Ultratip Bubbling Under Flanders)	18
Belgium (Ultratop 50 Wallonia)	3
France (SNEP)	1
Switzerland (Schweizer Hitparade)	15

=== Year-end charts ===
2019 Year-end chart performance for "Popopop"
Chart (2019)	Position
Belgium (Ultratop Wallonia)	96
France (SNEP)	20

2020 Year-end chart performance for "Popopop"
Chart (2020)	Position
France (SNEP)	46

== Certifications ==
Region	Certification	Certified units/sales
France (SNEP)	Diamond	333,333^{‡}
^{‡} Sales+streaming figures based on certification alone.
