= R.I.P.R.O =

Album by Lacrimنتماهمل

R.I.P.R.O. is a series of mixtapes by French rapper Lacrim. R.I.P.R.O. designates Rusé, Insoumis, Professionel, Respectable, Omerta (Crafty, Unruly, Professional, Respectable, Omerta).

== Volume 1 ==
R.I.P.R.O. Volume 1

Mixtape by Lacrim
- Released: 1 June 2015
- Recorded: 2015
- Genre: French rap
- Label: Ripro Music / Def Jam France
- Producers: DJ Bellek, Kore

Lacrim chronology
Corleone (2014)	R.I.P.R.O. Volume 1 (2015)	R.I.P.R.O. Vol. 2 (2015)

Singles from R.I.P.R.O. Vol.1
- 1. "Sablier" Released: 11 May 2015; 2. "Carte de la vieillesse" Released: 21 May 2015; 3. "Billets en l'air" Released: 29 May 2015; 4. "Voyous" Released: 11 June 2015

R.I.P.R.O. Volume I was released on June 1, 2015, by Ripro Music and Def Jam France. The album was co-produced by DJ Bellek and Kore with one additional track produced by The MeKanics & Spiff and one additional track co-produced by Beatzeps.

=== Track listing ===
1. "Sale époque Part.2" (4:19)
2. "Corleone Remix" (feat. Young Breed, Billy Blue, YT Triz & Rimkus) (6:20)
3. "Carte de la vieillesse" (5:08)
4. "Money" (feat. Migos) (3:30)
5. "Sablier" (3:49)
6. "Mon fils" (4:39)
7. "Voyous" (feat. Gradur) (3:43)
8. "Red Zone" (feat. Nessbeal & Rimkus) (4:07)
9. "Ça débite" (3:14)
10. "Y.a.R" (3:42)
11. "A.W.A. 2" (3:55)
12. "6.35" (feat. SCH & Sadek) (4:02)
13. "Billets en l'air" (3:12)
14. "Millions" (SCH) (3:14)

=== Charts ===
Chart (2015)	Peak position
Belgian Albums (Ultratop Flanders)	87
Belgian Albums (Ultratop Wallonia)	8
French Albums (SNEP)	1
Swiss Albums (Schweizer Hitparade)	20

=== Certifications ===
Region	Certification	Certified units/sales
France (SNEP)	Platinum	100,000^{‡}
^{‡} Sales+streaming figures based on certification alone.

== Volume 2 ==
R.I.P.R.O. Volume 2

Mixtape by Lacrim
- Released: 11 December 2015
- Recorded: 2015
- Genre: French rap
- Label: Ripro Music / Def Jam France
- Producer: Kore

Lacrim chronology
R.I.P.R.O. Vol. 1 (2015)	R.I.P.R.O. Volume 2 (2015)	Force & Honneur (2017)

Singles from R.I.P.R.O. Volume 2
- 1. "Gustavo Gaviria" Released: 26 October 2015; 2. "Poutine" Released: 6 November 2015; 3. "Brasse au max" Released: 25 November 2015; 4. "J'ai mal" Released: 30 November 2015; 5. "Marabout" Released: 11 December 2015

R.I.P.R.O. Volume 2 (full name Kore & Lacrim présentent R.I.P.R.O. 2) was released on December 11, 2015, by Ripro Music and Def Jam France. It was fully produced by Kore.

=== Track listing ===
1. "Poutine" (3:07)
2. "Gustavo Gaviria" (3:06)
3. "J'ai mal" (3:49)
4. "Brasse au max" (3:13)
5. "Petit jaloux" (featuring Maître Gims) (3:23)
6. "Marabout" (3:47)
7. "C'est ma vie" (3:03)
8. "Casa" (3:45)
9. "Adieu" (4:11)
10. "Sur ma mère" (4:19)
11. "En la calle" (featuring Yandel) (3:32)
12. "On y est" (featuring SCH, Rimkus & Walid) (4:14)
13. "On se reverra" (3:29)
14. "Du papier" (Rimkus)

=== Charts ===
Chart (2015)	Peak position
Belgian Albums (Ultratop Wallonia)	12
French Albums (SNEP)	12
Swiss Albums (Schweizer Hitparade)	33

=== Certifications ===
Region	Certification	Certified units/sales
France (SNEP)	Platinum	100,000^{‡}
^{‡} Sales+streaming figures based on certification alone.

== Volume 3 ==
R.I.P.R.O. Volume 3

Mixtape by Lacrim
- Released: 17 November 2017
- Recorded: 2017
- Genre: French rap
- Label: Ripro Music / Def Jam France

Lacrim chronology
Force & Honneur (2017)	R.I.P.R.O. Volume 3 (2017)

Singles from R.I.P.R.O. Volume 3
- 1. "Ce soir ne sors pas" Released: 7 July 2017; 2. "Judy Moncada" Released: 23 September 2017; 3. "Tous les mêmes" Released: 28 October 2017; 4. "Noche" Released: 25 November 2017

R.I.P.R.O. Volume 3 was released on November 17, 2017, by Ripro Music and Def Jam France.

=== Track listing ===
1. "Partis de rien" (4:04)
2. "Ce soir ne sors pas" (feat. Maître Gims) (3:53)
3. "La valise" (3:27)
4. "Vory v zakone" (3:31)
5. "Intocable" (feat. Mister You) (3:44)
6. "J'essaie" (2:37)
7. "Rio" (3:29)
8. "ALP - Pause" (3:17)
9. "Noche" (feat. Damso) (3:38)
10. "Tous les mêmes" (3:12)
11. "Mode S" (3:00)
12. "Veux-tu?" (feat. Ninho) (3:21)
13. "Audemars Piguet" (3:45)
14. "Judy Moncada" (3:14)
15. "London Blues" (feat. Paigey Cakey) (3:19)
16. "Guy 2 Bezbar - Strike" (3:40)
17. "3dabi" (feat. Shayfeen & Madd) (4:18)
18. "Gericault" (3:19)

=== Charts ===
Chart (2017)	Peak position
Belgian Albums (Ultratop Wallonia)	4
Belgian Albums (Ultratop Flanders)	69
French Albums (SNEP)	3
Swiss Albums (Schweizer Hitparade)	27

=== Certifications ===
Region	Certification	Certified units/sales
France (SNEP)	2× Platinum	200,000^{‡}
^{‡} Sales+streaming figures based on certification alone.

== Volume 4 ==
R.I.P.R.O. Volume 4

Mixtape by Lacrim
- Released: 16 October 2020
- Recorded: 2020
- Genre: French rap
- Label: Ripro Music / Def Jam France

Lacrim chronology
Lacrim (2019)	R.I.P.R.O. Volume 4 (2020)

Singles from R.I.P.R.O. Volume 4
- 1. "Allez nique ta mère" Released: 13 June 2020

R.I.P.R.O. Volume 4 was released on October 16, 2020, by Ripro Music and Def Jam France.

=== Track listing ===
1. "El Professor" (2:23)
2. "Jacques Chirac" (2:56)
3. "Nipsey Hussle" (feat. Niska) (2:55)
4. "Végéta" (3:15)
5. "Dadinho" (feat. Ninho) (3:28)
6. "Rafa & Carlos" (3:11)
7. "Boston George" (feat. Maes) (3:22)
8. "Picasso" (3:13)
9. "Big Meech" (feat. Leto) (3:13)
10. "Penelope Cruz" (3:07)
11. "Eric Cantona" (feat. Jul) (2:58)
12. "Allez nique ta mère" (feat. Soso Maness) (2:43)
13. "Dracula" (feat. Vladimir Cauchemar & Sfera Ebbasta) (2:32)
14. "Sam & Driss" (3:33)
15. "Zizou" (3:10)
16. "Kadryrov" (feat. Goulag) (3:24)
17. "Le Petit Nicolas" (3:27)

=== Charts ===
Chart (2017)	Peak position
Belgian Albums (Ultratop Wallonia)	6
Belgian Albums (Ultratop Flanders)	34
French Albums (SNEP)	2
Swiss Albums (Schweizer Hitparade)	12

=== Certifications ===
Region	Certification	Certified units/sales
France (SNEP)	Gold	50,000^{‡}
^{‡} Sales+streaming figures based on certification alone.
