= Méchant =

Méchant may refer to:

- Méchant (band), an American rock band that formed in 2002
- "Méchant" (song), a song by French rapper Niska released in 2021
- Le Méchant, a 1747 play by Jean-Baptiste-Louis Gresset
