= Dans l'espace =

2020 single by Gambi featuring Heuss L'Enfoiré

Single by Gambi featuring Heuss l'Enfoiré
- Released: 17 January 2020
- Length: 2:54
- Label: Rec. 118
- Songwriters: Cosmo; Karim Djeriou; Gambi; SHK; Bloody; Guapo du Soleil

Gambi singles chronology
"Popopop" (2019)	"Dans l'espace" (2020)	"Macintosh" (2020)

Heuss L'Enfoiré singles chronology
"Super Silver Maze" (2019)	"Dans l'espace" (2020)	"Centre commercial" (2020)

Music video
- "Dans l'espace" on YouTube

"Dans l'espace" is a song by French rapper Gambi featuring Heuss l'Enfoiré. It was released on 17 January 2020, and topped the singles chart in France.

== Charts ==
=== Weekly charts ===
Chart performance for "Dans l'espace"
Chart (2020)	Peak position
Belgium (Ultratop 50 Wallonia)	15
France (SNEP)	1
Switzerland (Schweizer Hitparade)	28

=== Year-end charts ===
2020 Year-end chart performance for "Dans l'espace"
Chart (2020)	Position
France (SNEP)	30

== Certifications ==
Region	Certification	Certified units/sales
France (SNEP)	Platinum	200,000^{‡}
^{‡} Sales+streaming figures based on certification alone.
