= Du lundi au lundi =

Single by Niska

from the album Mr Sal
- Released: 2019
- Genre: French hip hop
- Length: 2:46
- Label: Universal Music France
- Songwriter: Niska

Niska singles chronology
"Médicament" (2019)	"Du lundi au lundi" (2019)	"Passa Passa" (2019)

Music video
- "Du lundi au lundi" on YouTube

"Du lundi au lundi" is a song by Niska released as a single in 2019. It reached number five on the SNEP singles chart in France and was later certified Platinum.

== Charts ==
Chart performance for "Du lundi au lundi"
Chart (2019)	Peak position
Belgium (Ultratop 50 Wallonia)	32
France (SNEP)	5
Switzerland (Schweizer Hitparade)	68

== Certifications ==
Certifications for "Du lundi au lundi"
Region	Certification	Certified units/sales
France (SNEP)	Platinum	200,000^{‡}
^{‡} Sales+streaming figures based on certification alone.
