= Joli bébé =

Single by Naza feat. Niska
- Released: September 10, 2020
- Recorded: 2020
- Length: 2:59
- Label: Capirolesquen
- Songwriter(s): DJ Erise; Georges Stanislas; Jean-Désiré; Latimer; Leo

Naza singles chronology
"Souris verte" (2020)	"Joli bébé" (2020)

Niska singles chronology
"Criminel" (2020)	"Joli bébé" (2020)

Music video
- "Joli bébé" on YouTube

Joli bébé is a song by Naza and Niska released on 10 September, 2020.

== Charts ==
=== Weekly charts ===
Chart (2020)	Peak position
Belgium (Ultratip Bubbling Under Flanders)	35
Belgium (Ultratop 50 Wallonia)	17
France (SNEP)	2
Switzerland (Schweizer Hitparade)	19

=== Year-end charts ===
Chart (2021)	Position
France (SNEP)	54

== Certifications ==
Region	Certification	Certified units/sales
Belgium (BRMA)	Gold	20,000^{‡}
France (SNEP)	Diamond	333,333^{‡}
^{‡} Sales+streaming figures based on certification alone.
