= Salé (song) =

Single by Niska

from the album Commando
- Released: 14 July 2017
- Genre: French hip hop
- Length: 2:50
- Label: Universal Music France
- Producer: Pyroman

Niska singles chronology
"Réseaux" (2017)	"Salé" (2017)	"Sous contrôle" (2018)

Music video
- "Salé" on YouTube

"Salé" is a 2017 song by French rapper Niska. Its music video has over 192 million views.

== Charts ==
=== Weekly charts ===
Chart (2017)	Peak position
Belgium (Ultratop 50 Wallonia)	42
France (SNEP)	2
Switzerland (Schweizer Hitparade)	62

== Certifications ==
Region	Certification	Certified units/sales
France (SNEP)	Diamond	233,333^{‡}
^{‡} Sales+streaming figures based on certification alone.
