= Corleone (album) =

Studio album by Lacrim
- Released: 1 September 2014
- Recorded: 2013–2014
- Genre: Rap
- Label: Def Jam / Universal Music Group

Lacrim chronology
| Né pour mourir (2013) | Corleone (2014) | R.I.P.R.O. Vol. 1 (2015) |

Singles from Corleone
- 1. "Mon glock te mettra à genoux" Released: 2014; 2. "Tout le monde veut des Lovés" Released: 2014; 3. "Corleone" Released: 2014; 4. "Pocket Coffee" Released: 2014; 5. "Pronto" Released: 2014

Corleone is the first studio album of Lacrim, French rapper of Algerian origin.

== Track list ==
1. "Corleone" (3:06)
2. "Mon glock te mettra à genoux" (4:04)
3. "Oz" (3:31)
4. "Tout le monde veut des Lovés" (3:10)
5. "Pronto" (4:29)
6. "Barbade" (3:28)
7. "On fait pas ça" (feat. Lil Durk) (4:07)
8. "La rue" (3:40)
9. "Pour de vrai" (3:59)
10. "Bracelet" (3:26)
11. "Le loup d'la street" (feat. Amel Bent) (2:54)
12. "A.W.A." (feat. French Montana) (2:43)
13. "Pocket Coffee" (3:31)
14. "J'suis qu'un thug" (3:16)
15. "Mon frère" (4:48)

== Charts ==
=== Weekly charts ===
| Chart (2014) | Peak position |
|---|---|
| Belgian Albums (Ultratop Flanders) | 113 |
| Belgian Albums (Ultratop Wallonia) | 6 |
| French Albums (SNEP) | 1 |
| Swiss Albums (Schweizer Hitparade) | 37 |

=== Year-end charts ===
| Chart (2014) | Position |
|---|---|
| Belgian Albums (Ultratop Wallonia) | 152 |
| French Albums (SNEP) | 63 |

| Chart (2015) | Position |
|---|---|
| French Albums (SNEP) | 184 |

== Certifications ==
| Region | Certification | Certified units/sales |
|---|---|---|
| France (SNEP) | Platinum | 100,000^{‡} |
^{‡} Sales+streaming figures based on certification alone.
