= On était beau =

Single by Louane

from the album Louane
- Released: 30 June 2017
- Genre: French pop
- Songwriters: Dany Synthé; Guillaume Boscaro; Thomas Caruso; Aron Ottignon
- Producer: Dany Synthé

Louane singles chronology
"Tourne" (2016)	"On était beau" (2017)	"Si t'étais là" (2017)

"On était beau" is a song by French singer Louane. It was released on 30 June 2017 as the lead single from her second studio album Louane. The song has peaked at number nine on the French Singles Chart.

== Charts ==
=== Weekly charts ===
Chart (2017)	Peak position
Belgium (Ultratip Bubbling Under Flanders)	47
Belgium (Ultratop 50 Wallonia)	6
France (SNEP)	9
Switzerland (Schweizer Hitparade)	76
Switzerland (Media Control Romandy)	9

=== Year-end charts ===
Chart (2017)	Position
Belgium (Ultratop Wallonia)	48
France (SNEP)	155

=== Certifications ===
Region	Certification	Certified units/sales
France (SNEP)	Diamond	333,333^{‡}
^{‡} Sales+streaming figures based on certification alone.
