= Sena Kana =

Japanese pop singer

- Born: Tokyo, Japan
- Genres: Pop
- Occupation: Singer
- Years active: 2017–present
- Website: senakana.com

Sena Kana is a Japanese pop singer. Her 2018 single, "Truth or Dare", appeared on various European charts, including at number 1 on France's Digital Song Sales chart. Her 2019 single, "Up", featured Wiz Khalifa and Sheppard. The song was certified Gold in the United States, making Sena Kana the first Japanese female solo artist to achieve that feat. In 2020, Sena Kana released her debut EP titled Serenity, which was executively produced by Jason "Poo Bear" Boyd. Boyd was also featured on the project's second track "Undisputed".

Kana released Show Me, her second EP, in November 2021. It debuted at number 112 on the US Billboard 200.

== Early life and education ==
Sena Kana was born in Tokyo, Japan. As a child, she showed an interest in musicals like The Sound of Music. In school life, she was cast in the lead role in several plays, and later attended a music academy in Japan where she studied vocal music.

== Career ==
Sena Kana began releasing music in 2017 with the single, "Live Your Dreams". The song reached number 1 on the European iTunes charts. The music video for "Live Your Dreams" was filmed in Oslo, Norway, with the Oslo Opera House as a backdrop. In 2018, she released another single, "Truth or Dare". That song reached the top of the France Digital Song Sales chart and appeared on several other European charts, as well.

In March 2019, Billboard premiered Sena Kana's next single, "Up", featuring American musical artist, Wiz Khalifa, and Australian band, Sheppard. The song was produced by Lindsey Jackson and Katalyst. It ultimately accrued over 85 million streams in the United States and was certified Gold. Sena Kana became the first Japanese female to have a Gold-certified single in the United States as a solo act.

On August 31, 2020, Kana released her debut EP Serenity. The four-track extended play was executively produced by songwriter and producer Jason "Poo Bear" Boyd. Boyd was also the only featured act on the EP, appearing on the second song, "Undisputed". Production duo Katalyst (Ken Lewis and Brent Kolatalo), whom worked on Kana's "Up", also returned for Serenity, mixing and mastering the extended play in its entirety.

== Discography ==
=== Extended plays ===
List of EPs, showing release date and chart positions
Title	Release date	Peak chart positions
Title	Release date	US
Serenity	August 31, 2020	—
Show Me	November 8, 2021	112

=== Singles ===
List of singles, showing year released, chart positions and album name
Title	Year	Peaks		Certifications	Album
Title	Year	FRA Dig.	NLD Tip	Certifications	Album
"Live Your Dreams"	2017	—	—		Non-album singles
"Truth or Dare"	2018	1	16		Non-album singles
"Up" (featuring Wiz Khalifa and Sheppard)	2019	—	—	RIAA: Gold	Non-album singles
"Serenity"	2020	—	—		Serenity EP
"Undisputed" (featuring Poo Bear)	2020	—	—		Serenity EP
"Show Me" (with Ty Dolla Sign)	2021	—	—		Show Me EP
"—" denotes a recording that did not chart or was not released in that territory.
