= Miami Vice (song) =

Single by Gims

from the album Ceinture noire
- Released: 15 March 2019
- Genre: Pop
- Length: 3:42
- Label: Play Two, Chahawat, Sony Music
- Producer(s): Renaud Rebillaud, Bugatti Beatz

Gims singles chronology
"Le Pire" (2018)	"Miami Vice" (2019)	"Hola Señorita" (2019)

Music video
- "Miami Vice" on YouTube

"Miami Vice" is a song by Congolese singer and rapper Gims published on Transcendance, a reissue of the Ceinture noire album. It was released on 15 March 2019 as the 11th single from Ceinture noire and the first of its reissue.

The song is largely inspired by the song "Self Control" originally written and performed in 1984 by Raf and covered by Laura Branigan the same year.

== Commercial reception ==
The single has ranked in three countries: Belgium, France and Switzerland. In France, Miami Vice ranked for twenty weeks in the ranking of singles (downloads and streaming), from March to July 2019, or five consecutive months. He went straight to the 39th position, his highest ranking. On the other hand, in the ranking of pure sales (without streaming), the title entered 5th place, which is its best ranking. It was certified gold by Syndicat National de l'Édition Phonographique.

== Charts ==
Chart (2019)	Peak position
Belgium (Ultratop 50 Wallonia)	37
France (SNEP)	39
Switzerland (Schweizer Hitparade)	83

== Certifications ==
Region	Certification	Certified units/sales
France (SNEP)	Gold	100,000^{‡}
^{‡} Sales+streaming figures based on certification alone.

== Release history ==
Country	Date	Label	Format
Worldwide	15 March 2019	Play Two, Chahawat, Sony Music	CD, digital download
France	15 March 2019	Play Two, Chahawat, Sony Music	CD, digital download
