= Fleek =

Fleek is a surname. Notable people with the surname include:

- Charles Clinton Fleek (1947–1969), United States Army sergeant and Medal of Honor recipient
- Sherman L. Fleek (born 1955), American military historian

== See also ==
- On fleek (disambiguation)
