= PGP (song) =

2019 song by Booba

Single by Booba
- Released: 25 January 2019
- Genre: French rap
- Length: 2:47
- Songwriters: Booba; Cubeatz; Exel the Future
- Producers: Cubeatz; Exel the Future

"PGP" is a song by French artist Booba released in 2019. The song reached number one on the French Singles Chart.

== Charts ==
Chart (2019)	Peak position
Belgium (Ultratop 50 Wallonia)	9
France (SNEP)	1
Switzerland (Schweizer Hitparade)	22
