= Juste une p'tite chanson =

Single by Les Enfoirés

from the album Mission Enfoirés
- Released: 14 January 2017
- Genre: Pop
- Length: 3:00
- Songwriters: Claude M'Barali; Grégoire Boissenot

"Juste une p'tite chanson" is a song by Les Enfoirés released in 2017. The song has peaked at number eight on the French Singles Chart.

== Charts ==
| Chart (2017) | Peak position |
|---|---|
| France (SNEP) | 8 |
