= Si t'étais là =

Single by Louane

from the album Louane
- Released: 13 October 2017
- Genre: French pop music
- Length: 2:33
- Songwriters: Gioacchino Maurici; Marie Bastide
- Producer: Dany Synthé

Louane singles chronology
"On était beau" (2017)	"Si t'étais là" (2017)	"Immobile" (2018)

"Si t'étais là" is a song by french singer Louane. It was released on 13 October 2017 as the second single from her second studio album Louane. The song has peaked at number two on the French Singles Chart.

== Charts ==
=== Weekly charts ===
Chart (2017)	Peak position
Belgium (Ultratip Bubbling Under Flanders)	3
Belgium (Ultratop 50 Wallonia)	3
France (SNEP)	2
Switzerland (Schweizer Hitparade)	49
Switzerland (Media Control Romandy)	2

=== Year-end charts ===
Chart (2018)	Position
Belgium (Ultratop Wallonia)	58

== Certifications ==
Region	Certification	Certified units/sales
France (SNEP)	Diamond	333,333^{‡}
^{‡} Sales+streaming figures based on certification alone.
