= Traîtres =

Single by Lacrim

from the album Force & Honneur
- Released: 11 February 2017
- Genre: French rap
- Length: 3:12
- Songwriters: Karim Zenoud; Double X
- Producer: The Ghost

"Traîtres" is a song by Lacrim released in 2017. The song peaked at number two on the French Singles Chart.

== Charts ==
Chart (2017)	Peak position
Belgium (Ultratop 50 Wallonia)	14
France (SNEP)	2
Switzerland (Schweizer Hitparade)	49
