= Réseaux =

Single by Niska

from the album Commando
- Released: 14 July 2017
- Genre: French hip hop
- Length: 3:30
- Label: Universal Music France
- Songwriters: Niska; Pyroman
- Producer: Pyroman

Niska singles chronology
"Chasse à l'homme" (2017)	"Réseaux" (2017)	"Salé" (2017)

Music video
- "Réseaux" on YouTube

"Réseaux" is a 2017 song by French rapper Niska. It peaked atop in France and Belgium. Its music video has over 320 million views.

== Charts ==
=== Weekly charts ===
Chart (2017)	Peak position
Belgium (Ultratip Bubbling Under Flanders)	23
Belgium (Ultratop 50 Wallonia)	1
France (SNEP)	1
Germany (GfK)	41
Switzerland (Schweizer Hitparade)	23

=== Year-end charts ===
Chart (2017)	Position
Belgium (Ultratop Wallonia)	21
France (SNEP)	3

Chart (2018)	Position
France (SNEP)	49

== Certifications ==
Region	Certification	Certified units/sales
Belgium (BRMA)	Platinum	20,000^{‡}
France (SNEP)	Diamond	233,333^{‡}
Germany (BVMI)	Gold	200,000^{‡}
^{‡} Sales+streaming figures based on certification alone.

== Remix ==
Due to its popularity, a remix featuring rappers Stefflon Don and Quavo was released in 2018.
