= Kalash (rapper) =

French rapper (born 1988)

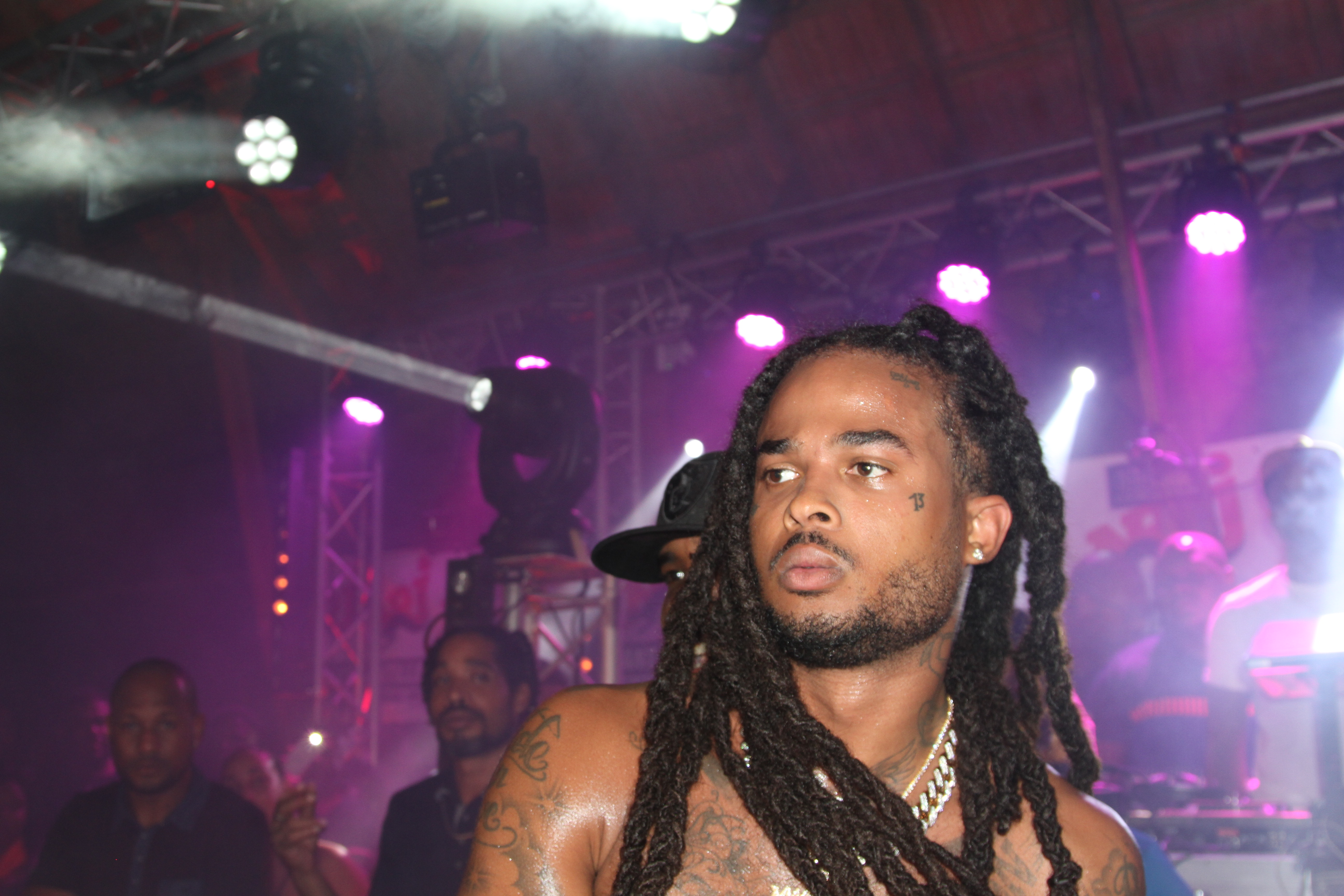

Background information
- Also known as: Kalash
- Born: Kévin Valleray; 12 June 1988 (age 38); Strasbourg, Alsace, France
- Origin: Martinique, Overseas France
- Genres: Hip hop; reggae; dancehall; zouk
- Occupations: Singer; songwriter; rapper; fashion designer; record producer
- Years active: 2003–present
- Label: Universal Music Group

Kévin Valleray (born 12 June 1988), known by his stage name Kalash, is a Martinican rapper and singer mixing trap music and Caribbean influences. Kalash is a reference to the Russian Kalashnikov rifle. He is also famous for his collaborations with French rap and hip hop artists notably Booba and Admiral T. His album Kaos released on 6 May 2016 on Capitol Records / Universal Music Group reached number 4 on the French SNEP albums chart.

== Discography ==
=== Album ===
Year	Album	Peak positions			Certification
Year	Album	FRA	BEL (Wa)	SWI	Certification
2016	Kaos	4	49	—	
2017	Mwaka Moon	3	27	79	SNEP: Gold
2019	Diamond Rock	14	77	—	
2022	Tombolo	2	66	—	
2026	Ex-Voto	4	—	—	

=== Singles ===
Year	Single	Peak positions					Album
Year	Single	FRA	AUT	BEL (Wa)	ITA	SWI	Album
2014	"Chanson du Mwaka"	200	—	—	—	—	Non-album single
2015	"Bando"	44	—	—	—	—	Kaos
2016	"Danjé"	36	—	—	—	—	Kaos
2016	"Après l'automne"	53	—	—	—	—	Kaos
2016	"Rouge et bleu" (feat. Booba)	15	—	—	—	—	Kaos
2016	"N.W.A" (feat. Booba)	49	—	—	—	—	Kaos
2016	"Ochan"	56	—	—	—	—	Non-album singles
2017	"Friendzone" (feat. Still Fresh)	59	—	—	—	—	Non-album singles
2017	"Big Machine"	177	—	—	—	—	Non-album singles
2017	"Moments gâchés" (feat. Satori)	23	—	—	—	—	Mwaka Moon
2017	"Yen a vla"	63	—	—	—	—	Mwaka Moon
2017	"Mwaka Moon" (feat. Damso)	1	67	1	19	25	Mwaka Moon
2019	"Bonda Manman'w"	67	—	—	—	—	Diamond Rock
2019	"JTC" (with Damso)	16	—	46	—	—	Diamond Rock
2019	"Praliné" (with Damso)	65	—	—	—	—	Diamond Rock
2019	"Mada"	127	—	—	—	—	Diamond Rock
2021	"Tu le sais" (with Gazo)	21	—	—	—	—	Non-album releases
2022	"Malpolis" (with Damso)	—	—	27	—	—	Tombolo
2024	"Alpha" (with Damso)	1	—	—	—	—	

=== Other songs ===
Year	Single	Peak positions	Album
Year	Single	FRA	Album
2016	"Taken"	63	Kaos
2016	"Neo"	165	Kaos
2017	"Koussi Koussa" (feat. Niska)	34	Mwaka Moon
2017	"God Knows" (feat. Mavado)	94	Mwaka Moon
2017	"Mwaka Story"	112	Mwaka Moon
2017	"No Roof" (feat. Vybz Kartel)	118	Mwaka Moon
2017	"I Wanna Be Loved"	133	Mwaka Moon
2017	"Snitch" (feat. Lacrim)	153	Mwaka Moon
2017	"Mode Avion"	163	Mwaka Moon
2017	"I Can See Why" (feat. King Kosa)	187	Mwaka Moon
2019	"Polémique" (feat. Kalash Criminel)	82	Diamond Rock

=== Featured in ===
Year	Single	Peak positions	Album
Year	Single	FRA	Album
2014	"Pas sans toi" (Yoan feat. Kalash)	168	Kaos
2025	"Shake It to the Max (Fly)" (Remix) (with Moliy, Silent Addy and Maureen)	–	Non-album single
