= Rimkus =

- Lithuanian surname
- m.: Rimkus
- f.: (unmarried): Rimkutė
- f.: (married): Rimkienė, Rimkuvienė
- f.: (short): Rimkė
- Origin: diminutive of the Lithuanian given name Rimkantas

Rimkus is a Lithuanian surname, being the diminutive of the given name Rimkantas. Notable people with the surname include:

- Andreas Rimkus (born 1962), German politician
- Deimantė Rimkutė, (born 1998), Lithuanian politician
- Dovilė Rimkutė (born 2001), Lithuanian female rower
- Ed Rimkus (1913–1999), American bobsledder
- Gunter Rimkus (1928–2015), German dramaturge
- Joseph E. Rimkus (1974–1996) United States Air Force Airman killed in Khobar Towers Bombing
- Kęstutis Rimkus (born 1953), Lithuanian politician
- Lorenzo Rimkus (born 1984), Dutch footballer
- Vīts Rimkus (born 1973), Latvian footballer
- Vytenis Rimkus (1930–2020), Lithuanian painter and encyclopedist
