= Méchant (song) =

Single by Niska featuring Ninho

from the album Mr Sal
- Released: 5 September 2019
- Recorded: 2019
- Genre: French hip hop
- Length: 3:30
- Label: Universal Music France
- Songwriters: Niska; Ninho

Niska featuring Ninho singles chronology
"Bâtiment" (2019)	"Méchant" (2019)	"Siliconé" (2019)

Music video
- "Méchant" on YouTube

"Méchant" is a 2019 song by French rapper Niska featuring Ninho. The song peaked atop the French SNEP singles chart, making it Niska's second chart-topping song of the year following "Médicament". The accompanying music video for the song was released on 23 December 2019. It is Niska's third collaboration with Ninho.

== Charts ==
Chart performance for "Méchant"
Chart (2019)	Peak position
France (SNEP)	1
Switzerland (Schweizer Hitparade)	24

== Certifications ==
Certifications for "Méchant"
Region	Certification	Certified units/sales
France (SNEP)	Platinum	200,000^{‡}
^{‡} Sales+streaming figures based on certification alone.
