= Médicament =

Single by Niska featuring Booba

from the album Mr Sal
- Released: 2019
- Genre: French hip hop
- Length: 3:18
- Label: Universal Music France
- Songwriters: Niska; Booba

Niska featuring Booba singles chronology
"Giuseppe" (2019)	"Médicament" (2019)	"Du lundi au lundi" (2019)

Music video
- "Médicament" on YouTube

"Médicament" is a song by French rapper Niska featuring Booba released in 2019. It charted atop the French SNEP singles chart, and was one of two chart-topping songs Niska had in 2019, with the other being "Méchant".

== Charts ==
=== Weekly charts ===
Chart performance for "Médicament"
Chart (2019)	Peak position
Belgium (Ultratop 50 Wallonia)	26
France (SNEP)	1
Switzerland (Schweizer Hitparade)	43

=== Year-end charts ===
2019 Year-end chart performance for "Médicament"
Chart (2019)	Position
France (SNEP)	4

== Certifications ==
Certifications for "Médicament"
Region	Certification	Certified units/sales
France (SNEP)	Platinum	200,000^{‡}
^{‡} Sales+streaming figures based on certification alone.
