= Oh bah oui =

Single by Lacrim and Booba

from the album Force & Honneur
- Genre: French rap
- Length: 3:18
- Songwriters: Karim Zenoud; Élie Yaffa; Soulayman Beats; DST
- Producer: The Ghost

"Oh bah oui" is a song by Lacrim and Booba released in 2017. The song has peaked at number ten on the French Singles Chart.

== Charts ==
Chart (2017)	Peak position
France (SNEP)	10
Switzerland (Schweizer Hitparade)	48

== Certifications ==
Region	Certification	Certified units/sales
France (SNEP)	Platinum	133,333^{‡}
^{‡} Sales+streaming figures based on certification alone.
