= Mwaka Moon =

Single by Kalash featuring Damso

from the album Mwaka Moon
- Released: 13 October 2017
- Genre: French hip hop
- Length: 3:57
- Songwriter(s): Kévin Valleray; Damso
- Producer(s): Pyroman

"Mwaka Moon" is a song by French rapper Kalash featuring Damso and Sfera Ebbasta released in October 2017. The song reached number one on the French Singles Chart.

== Charts ==
=== Weekly charts ===
Chart (2017–2018)	Peak position
Austria (Ö3 Austria Top 40)	67
Belgium (Ultratip Bubbling Under Flanders)	10
Belgium (Ultratop 50 Wallonia)	1
France (SNEP)	1
Germany (GfK)	26
Italy (FIMI)	19
Switzerland (Schweizer Hitparade)	25

=== Year-end charts ===
Chart (2017)	Position
Belgium (Ultratop Wallonia)	78
France (SNEP)	6

Chart (2018)	Position
Belgium (Ultratop Wallonia)	68
France (SNEP)	19
Italy (FIMI)	81

== Certifications ==
Region	Certification	Certified units/sales
Belgium (BRMA)	Gold	10,000^{‡}
France (SNEP)	Diamond	233,333^{‡}
Germany (BVMI)	Gold	200,000^{‡}
^{‡} Sales+streaming figures based on certification alone.
