= On Fleek (song) =

Single by Eva featuring Lartiste

from the album Queen
- Released: 11 January 2019
- Genre: Pop
- Length: 2:54
- Songwriters: Youssef Akdim; Fabio Lancel; Gbalia Stan; Eva Garnier
- Producers: Fabio Lancel; Gbalia Stan

"On Fleek" is a 2019 French song by singer Eva Garnier featuring Lartiste. It was written by Youssef Akdim, Fabio Lancel, Gbalia Stan and Eva Garnier and produced by Fabio Lancel and Gbalia Stan. It topped the official French SNEP Singles Chart and also charted in Belgium.

== Charts ==
=== Weekly charts ===
Chart (2019)	Peak position
Belgium (Ultratop 50 Wallonia)	26
France (SNEP)	1

=== Year-end charts ===
Chart (2019)	Position
Belgium (Ultratop Wallonia)	93
France (SNEP)	37

== Certifications ==
Region	Certification	Certified units/sales
France (SNEP)	Platinum	200,000^{‡}
^{‡} Sales+streaming figures based on certification alone.
