= Lacrim =

French-Algerian rapper (born 1985)

- Born: Karim Zenoud; 19 April 1985 (age 41); Ménilmontant, Paris, France
- Origin: Algeria
- Occupations: Rapper; songwriter
- Years active: 2008-present
- Labels: 13ème Art Music; Tiguere Music Group; Def Jam France; Plata O Plomo; Capitol; AWA Universal
- Website: lacrim.store

Karim Zenoud (French pronunciation: [kaʁim zenud]; Arabic: كريم زنود, born 19 April 1985), better known by his stage name Lacrim (/lɑːˈkrɪm/, French: [lakʁim]; sometimes stylized as LaCrim), is an Algerian-French rapper.

== Youth ==
Karim Zenoud was born in the 20th arrondissement of Paris to Algerian immigrant parents. Both of his parents are Kabyle, his father's family is from Sidi Daoud and his mother's from Béjaïa. He is also the grandson of actress Ouardia Hamtouche. He spent the first five years of his life in the 13th arrondissement, before his parents moved permanently to Chevilly-Larue, south of Paris.

== Career ==
After collaborations with various rappers, he released his album Faites entrer Lacrim in May 2012 followed by a mixtape Toujours le même in December 2012. The following two albums, Corleone in 2014 and Force & Honneur in 2017 both topped the French Albums Chart. He also released three successive mixtapes under the R.I.P.R.O series two in 2015 and a third in 2017.

== Legal issues ==
Accused of possession of a kalashnikov gun, he was condemned to three years of imprisonment. After 8 months of hiding in Morocco, he presented himself on 9 September 2015 to the French authorities who imprisoned him for a second time in three years. He was released on 28 November 2016, after remaining in incarceration for a full year.

== Discography ==
=== Studio albums ===
Year	Album	Peak positions					Certifications
Year	Album	FR	BEL (Fl)	BEL (Wa)	NED	SWI	Certifications
2014	Corleone	1	113	6	–	37	SNEP: Platinum
2017	Force & Honneur	1	105	2	74	8	SNEP: 3× Platinum
2019	Lacrim	1	28	4	18	9	SNEP: Gold
2021	Persona Non Grata	6	73	12	–	23	
2024	Veni Vidi Vici	6	–	5	–	26	

=== Street albums ===
Year	Album	Peak positions
Year	Album	FR
2012	Faites entrer Lacrim	16

=== EPs ===
Year	Album	Peak positions	
Year	Album	FR	BEL (Wa)
2013	Né pour mourir	12	96

=== Mixtapes ===
Year	Album	Peak positions					Certifications
Year	Album	FR	BEL (Fl)	BEL (Wa)	NED	SWI	Certifications
2010	Liberté provisoire	–	–	–	–	–	
2012	Toujours le même	173	–	–	–	–	
2015	R.I.P.R.O Vol. 1	1	87	8	–	20	SNEP: Platinum
2015	R.I.P.R.O 2	12	–	12	–	33	SNEP: Platinum
2017	R.I.P.R.O 3	1	69	4	117	27	SNEP: 2× Platinum
2020	R.I.P.R.O 4	2	34	6	–	12	SNEP: Gold
2025	R.I.P.R.O	1	–	11	–	–	

=== Singles ===
Year	Title	Peak positions			Certifications	Album
Year	Title	FR	BEL (Wa)	SWI	Certifications	Album
2013	"On va tout perdre" (feat. Mister You)	116	–	–		Né pour mourir
2014	"Mon glock te mettra à genoux"	12	1* (Ultratip)	–		Corleone
2014	"Tout le monde veut des Lovés"	25	–	–		Corleone
2014	"Corleone"	28	–	–		Corleone
2014	"Pocket Coffee"	30	–	–		Corleone
2014	"Pronto"	11	26* (Ultratip)	–		Corleone
2015	"Sablier"	36	–	–		R.I.P.R.O Vol. 1
2015	"Billets en l'air"	35	–	–		R.I.P.R.O Vol. 1
2017	"Traîtres"	2	14	49	SNEP: Platinum	Force & Honneur
2017	"Grande armée"	2	35	60	SNEP: Platinum	Force & Honneur
2017	"Colonel Carrillo"	2	44	88	SNEP: Gold	Force & Honneur
2017	"Ce soir ne sors pas" (feat. Maître Gims)	20	46	–	SNEP: Platinum	R.I.P.R.O Vol. 3
2017	"Judy Moncada"	13	10* (Ultratip)	–	SNEP: Gold	R.I.P.R.O Vol. 3
2017	"Tous les mêmes"	12	48	–	SNEP: Gold	R.I.P.R.O Vol. 3
2017	"Noche" (feat. Damso)	2	–	65	SNEP: Platinum	R.I.P.R.O Vol. 3
2018	"Jon Snow"	6	15* (Ultratip)	–		Lacrim
2019	"Solo"	14	16* (Ultratip)	–		Lacrim
2019	"Tiguere II (Freestyle)"	185	–	–		
2019	"Tiguere 3 (Freestyle)"	69	–	–		
2020	"Allez nique ta mère" (feat. Soso Maness)	15	41	–		R.I.P.R.O Vol. 4
2021	"Mango" (with Kore)	32	–	–		Non-album singles
2021	"Santorini" (with Rimkus)	42	–	–		Non-album singles
2021	"L'immortale"	27	–	–		Non-album singles
2023	"Code Barre"	19	–	–		Non-album singles
2024	"No lo sé"	7	28	–		Veni Vidi Vici
2024	"Joie de Fillles" (featuring Vacra)	17	44	–		Veni Vidi Vici

*Did not appear in the official Belgian Ultratop 50 charts, but rather in the bubbling under Ultratip charts.

=== Other charting releases ===
Year	Single	Peak positions			Certifications	Album
Year	Single	FR	BEL (Wa)	SWI	Certifications	Album
2014	"A.W.A." (feat. French Montana)	104	—	—		Corleone
2014	"On fait pas ça" (feat. Lil Durk)	107	—	—		Corleone
2014	"Barbade"	135	—	—		Corleone
2014	"Bracelet"	141	—	—		Corleone
2014	"J'suis qu'un thug"	75	—	—		Corleone
2014	"Le loup d'la street" (feat. Amel Bent)	171	—	—		Corleone
2014	"Oz"	173	—	—		Corleone
2014	"Mon frère"	189	—	—		Corleone
2015	"A.W.A 2"	102	—	—		R.I.P.R.O Vol. 1
2015	"Carte de la vieillesse"	48	—	—		R.I.P.R.O Vol. 1
2015	"Voyous" (feat. Gradur)	89	—	—		R.I.P.R.O Vol. 1
2015	"6.35" (feat. SCH & Sadek)	134	—	—		R.I.P.R.O Vol. 1
2015	"Red Zone" (feat. Nessbeal & Rimkus)	140	—	—		R.I.P.R.O Vol. 1
2015	"Y a R"	151	—	—		R.I.P.R.O Vol. 1
2015	"Sale époque Part. 2"	154	—	—		R.I.P.R.O Vol. 1
2015	"Mon fils"	158	—	—		R.I.P.R.O Vol. 1
2015	"J'ai mal"	49	—	—		R.I.P.R.O Vol. 2
2015	"Gustavo Gaviria"	68	—	—		R.I.P.R.O Vol. 2
2015	"Poutine"	116	—	—		R.I.P.R.O Vol. 2
2015	"Brasse au max"	86	—	—		R.I.P.R.O Vol. 2
2015	"Marabout"	69	—	—		R.I.P.R.O Vol. 2
2015	"C'est ma vie"	146	—	—		R.I.P.R.O Vol. 2
2015	"Adieu"	147	—	—		R.I.P.R.O Vol. 2
2015	"Petit jaloux" (featuring Maître Gims)	64	—	—		R.I.P.R.O Vol. 2
2015	"En la calle" (featuring Yandel)	180	—	—		R.I.P.R.O Vol. 2
2015	"On y est" (featuring SCH, Rimkus & Walid)	103	—	—		R.I.P.R.O Vol. 2
2017	"Oh bah oui" (featuring Booba)	10	—	—	SNEP: Platinum	Force & Honneur
2017	"La dolce vita"	9	—	—	SNEP: Gold	Force & Honneur
2017	"20 bouteilles"	12	—	—	SNEP: Gold	Force & Honneur
2017	"Laisse-les" (featuring SCH)	27	—	—		Force & Honneur
2017	"Pardon..."	28	—	—		Force & Honneur
2017	"Rockefeller"	21	—	—		Force & Honneur
2017	"Tristi" (featuring Ghali)	13	—	91	SNEP: Gold	Force & Honneur
2017	"Papa Trabaja" (featuring Bruluxx)	44	—	—		Force & Honneur
2017	"2 Pac"	7	—	—	SNEP: Gold	Force & Honneur
2017	"Solitaire"	48	—	—		Force & Honneur
2017	"Ça paie pas"	26	—	—		Force & Honneur
2017	"Kim Jong Un"	22	—	—		Force & Honneur
2017	"Histoire de"	55	—	—		Force & Honneur
2017	"Mythone pas" (featuring Rimkus)	46	—	—		Force & Honneur
2017	"Cohiba"	33	—	—		Force & Honneur
2017	"Nuit blanche"	40	—	—		Force & Honneur
2017	"Gericault"	37	—	—	SNEP: Gold	R.I.P.R.O Vol. 3
2017	"Veux-tu ?" (featuring Ninho)	6	—	—	SNEP: Gold	R.I.P.R.O Vol. 3
2017	"Partis de rien"	16	—	—		R.I.P.R.O Vol. 3
2017	"La valise"	25	—	—		R.I.P.R.O Vol. 3
2017	"J'essaie"	14	—	—		R.I.P.R.O Vol. 3
2017	"Vory V Zakone"	27	—	—		R.I.P.R.O Vol. 3
2017	"Rio"	17	—	—		R.I.P.R.O Vol. 3
2017	"Mode S"	30	—	—		R.I.P.R.O Vol. 3
2017	"Intocable" (feat. Mister You)	5	—	—	SNEP: Gold	R.I.P.R.O Vol. 3
2017	"London Blues" (feat. Paigey Cakey)	62	—	—		R.I.P.R.O Vol. 3
2017	"3dabi" (feat. Shayfeen & Madd)	63	—	—		R.I.P.R.O Vol. 3
2017	"Audemars piguet"	22	—	—		R.I.P.R.O Vol. 3
2019	"Bloody" (featuring 6ix9ine)	11	17* (Ultratip)	—		Lacrim
2019	"Maladie" (featuring Soolking)	15	—	—	SNEP: Gold	Lacrim
2019	"RS6"	24	—	—		Lacrim
2019	"Patrizia"	25	—	—		Lacrim
2019	"Pardon mama"	61	—	—		Lacrim
2019	"Granada"	57	—	—		Lacrim
2019	"Puerto Rico" (featuring French Montana)	50	—	—		Lacrim
2019	"Miami"	65	—	—		Lacrim
2019	"Eprouvé" (featuring Kayna Samet)	43	—	—		Lacrim
2019	"Adjida"	85	—	—		Lacrim
2019	"Jvlius"	51	—	—		Lacrim
2019	"West Coast" (featuring Snoop Dogg)	31	—	—		Lacrim
2019	"Never Personal" (featuring Rick Ross)	46	—	—		Lacrim
2019	"Trabaja"	74	—	—		Lacrim
2019	"Kounti" (featuring Cheb Mami)	94	—	—		Lacrim
2019	"Fugazi" (featuring M Huncho and 3robi)	115	—	—		Lacrim
2019	"26 décembre 1999" (featuring Oxmo Puccino)	130	—	—		Lacrim
2019	"Tootsie's"	152	—	—		Lacrim
2019	"Philippins"	125	–	–		
2020	"Jacques Chirac"	20	7* (Ultratip)	—		R.I.P.R.O Vol. 4
2020	"Boston George" (with Maes)	3	—	64		R.I.P.R.O Vol. 4
2020	"Dadinho" (with Ninho)	4	—	—		R.I.P.R.O Vol. 4
2020	"Eric Cantona" (with Jul)	13	—	—		R.I.P.R.O Vol. 4
2020	"Végéta" (with Jul)	21	—	—		R.I.P.R.O Vol. 4
2020	"Nipsey Hussle"	22	—	—		R.I.P.R.O Vol. 4
2020	"Rafa & Carlos"	23	—	—		R.I.P.R.O Vol. 4
2020	"El Professor"	28	—	—		R.I.P.R.O Vol. 4
2020	"Penelope Cruz"	41	—	—		R.I.P.R.O Vol. 4
2020	"Picasso"	42	—	—		R.I.P.R.O Vol. 4
2020	"Big Meech"	52	—	—		R.I.P.R.O Vol. 4
2020	"Dracula" (feat. Vladimir Cauchemar & Sfera Ebbasta)	63	—	—		R.I.P.R.O Vol. 4
2020	"Zizou"	71	—	—		R.I.P.R.O Vol. 4
2020	"Sam & Driss"	83	—	—		R.I.P.R.O Vol. 4
2023	"Main Motte"	79	—	—		

*Did not appear in the official Belgian Ultratop 50 charts, but rather in the bubbling under Ultratip charts.

=== Featured in ===
Year	Single	Peak positions		Certifications	Album
Year	Single	FR	BEL (Wa)	Certifications	Album
2014	"Merci" (Alonzo feat. Lacrim)	111	—		
2015	"La douille" (Gradur feat. Lacrim)	85	—		
2015	"El Chapo" (Kaaris feat. Lacrim)	123	—		
2016	"Tony" (Kore, Lacrim & SCH)	13	35* (Ultratip)		Pattaya (soundtrack)
2016	"Mon frelo" (Kore, Lapso Laps, Lacrim, Sadek & SCH)	75	—		Packman (Lapso Lap album)
2017	"Ça va" (SCH feat. Lacrim)	42	—		
2017	"Snitch" (Kalash feat. Lacrim)	109	—		
2018	"Dix millions de dollars" (3robi feat Lacrim)	8	—		
2018	"VLT" (Dosseh feat. Lacrim)	48	—		
2018	"Maradona" (AM La Scampia feat. Lacrim)	62	—		
2018	"Rolls" (Hornet La Frappe feat. Lacrim)	15	25* (Ultratip)	SNEP: Gold	
2018	"Cosa nostra" (Soolking feat. Sofiane, Lacrim)	5	—		
2019	"Fortuné" (Naps feat. Lacrim)	124	—		Naps album On est fait pour ça
2020	"Validé" (Sam's feat. Lacrim)	90	—		Soundtrack; Validé
2020	"Qu'est-ce qu'ils connaissent?" (Sose Maness feat. Lacrim)	57	—		Soso Maness album Mistral
2020	"Big Money" (Leto feat. Lacrim)	57	—		Leto album 100 visages

*Did not appear in the official Belgian Ultratop 50 charts, but rather in the bubbling under Ultratip charts.

=== Others ===
- 2012: "On se rattrape" (Mister You feat. Lacrim and Seth Gueko) (in Mister You album MDR Mec de rue 2)
- 2013: "Un arabe à Miami" (in compilation album Planète Rap 2013)
