= Niska (rapper) =

French rapper (born 1994)

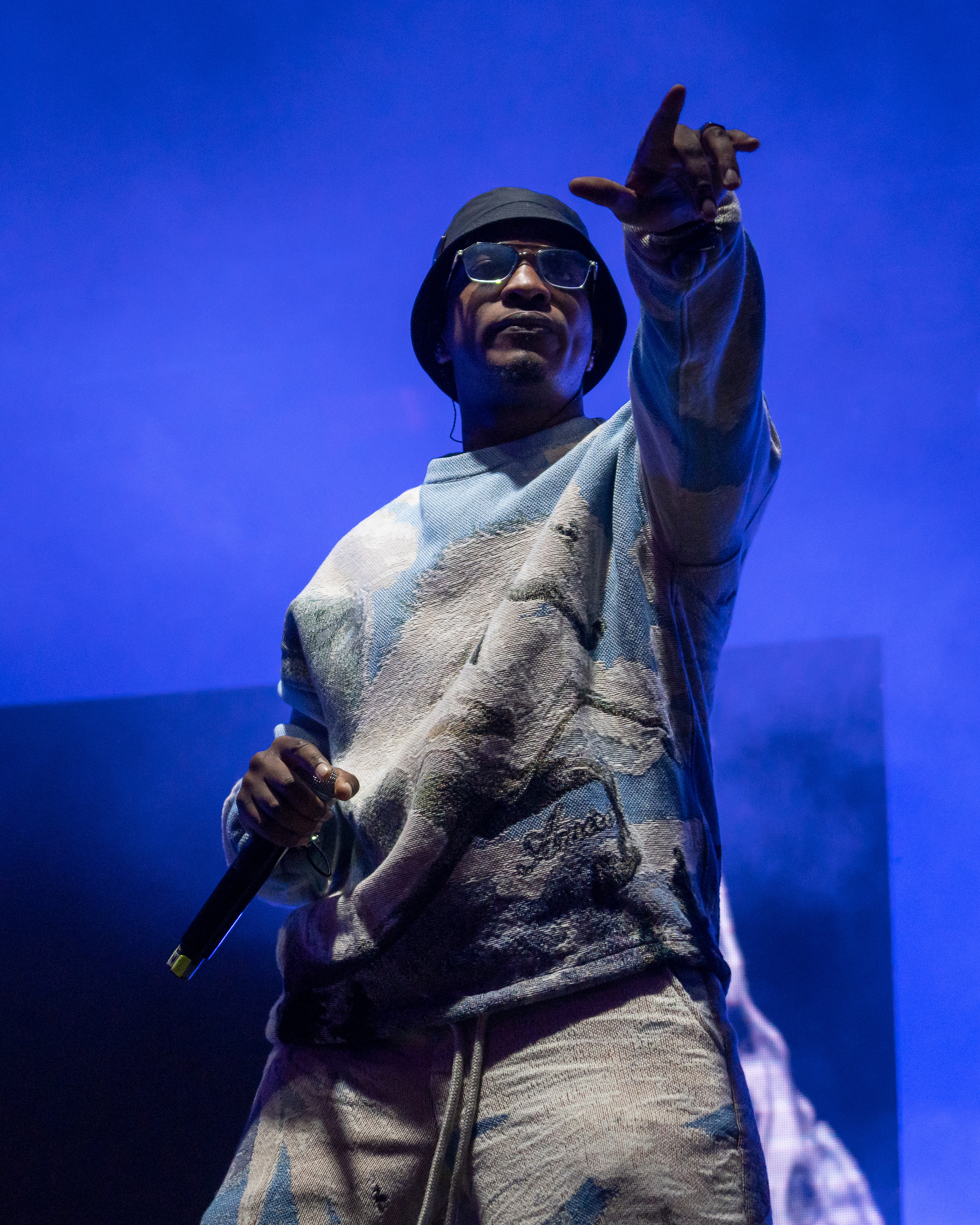

Background information
- Also known as: Zifukoro; Korozif N.S; Koro; Zifu; Charo
- Born: Stanislas Georges Dinga-Pinto; 6 April 1994 (age 32); Villeneuve-Saint-Georges, France
- Origin: Évry, Île-de-France, France
- Genre: French hip hop
- Occupation: Rapper
- Label: Universal Music

Stanislas Georges Dinga-Pinto (French pronunciation: [stanislas ʒɔʁʒ malik diŋɡa pinto]; born 6 April 1994), better known by the stage name Niska (French pronunciation: [niska]), is a French rapper from Évry-Courcouronnes, Essonne. He is signed to Universal Music France and Barclay Records. He was initially in the rap group Negro Deep before going solo. Niska is an anagram of the shortened version of his name (Stani) with the syllables in reverse (Nista). He then replaced the "t" with a "k". Niska has released four albums, Charo Life (2015), Zifukoro (2016), Commando (2017), Mr Sal (2019), and Le monde est méchant (2021) with the first two reaching number 3 on SNEP, the official French Albums chart and the third and fourth topping the French chart.

== Biography ==
Niska was born to Congolese parents in Évry-Courcouronnes, Essonne, in the southern suburbs of Paris. In 2010, he became a father at the age of 16.

== Discography ==
=== Albums ===
Year	Album	Peak positions						Units	Certifications
Year	Album	FRA	BEL (Fl)	BEL (Wa)	CAN	NLD	SWI	Units	Certifications
2015	Charo Life	3	—	10	—	—	—		
2016	Zifukoro	3	187	12	—	—	37		SNEP: Platinum
2017	Commando	1	23	3	—	88	6		SNEP: Diamond
2019	Mr Sal	1	11	1	36	46	4	FRA: 156,930	SNEP: 2× Platinum
2021	Le monde est méchant	2	31	3	—	—	4		
2024	GOAT (with Ninho)	1	67	1	—	—	—		

=== Singles ===
Year	Title	Peak positions			Certifications	Album
Year	Title	FRA	BEL (Wa)	SWI	Certifications	Album
2015	"Gros bonnets" (featuring Madrane)	80	—	—		Non-album single
2015	"Ochoa"	74	—	—		Charo Life
2015	"Jsuis dans l'truc (Freestyle)"	78	—	—		Non-album singles
2016	"Maître chien (Freestyle)"	191	—	—		Non-album singles
2016	"Zifukoro" (featuring Madrane)	120	—	—		Zifukoro
2016	"Elle avait son Djo" (featuring Maître Gims)	9	—	—	SNEP: Gold	Zifukoro
2016	"Commando"	37	32 (Ultratip*)	—	SNEP: Gold	Non-album single
2017	"B.O.C"	35	40	—	SNEP: Platinum	Commando
2017	"J'suis dans l'baye"	81	—	—	SNEP: Gold	Non-album single
2017	"Chasse à l'homme"	71	39	—	SNEP: Platinum	Commando
2017	"Réseaux"	1	1	23	SNEP: Diamond	Commando
2018	"W.L.G"	4	37	85	SNEP: Gold	Commando
2019	"Boom Bye Bye" (with Diplo)	21	20 (Ultratip*)	—	SNEP: Gold	Non-album singles
2019	"Giuseppe"	5	—	—	SNEP: Gold	Non-album singles
2019	"Médicament" (featuring Booba)	1	26	43	SNEP: Platinum	Mr Sal
2019	"Du lundi au lundi"	5	32	68	SNEP: Platinum	Mr Sal
2019	"Passa Passa (#BooskaMechant)"	14	—	—	SNEP: Platinum	Non-album single
2019	"La zone est minée"	27	36	—		Mr Sal
2020	"Bandit chef" (feat. Madrane)	26	—	—		Non-album singles
2021	"Chargé"	31	—	—		Non-album singles
2021	"Mapess"	9	—	—		Le monde est méchant
2022	"Genkidama"	5	—	—		Non-album singles
2024	"Coco" (with Ninho)	3	25	—		Non-album singles
2024	"911" (with Ninho and Koba LaD)	3	6	—		Non-album singles
2024	"Unrappeurcarap #2" (with Ninho)	34	—	—		Non-album singles
2025	"Adriano"	3	20	48		Non-album singles
2025	"OG" (with Genezio)	8	30	77		Non-album singles

*Did not appear in the official Belgian Ultratop 50 charts, but rather in the bubbling under Ultratip charts.

=== Other charting songs ===
Year	Title	Peak positions			Certifications	Album
Year	Title	FRA	BEL (Wa)	SWI	Certifications	Album
2015	"Matuidi Charo (PSG)" (featuring Rako, Brigi, Trafiquinte & Madrane)	34	8 (Ultratip*)	—		Charo Life
2016	"Mustapha Jefferson"	111	—	—	SNEP: Gold	Zifukoro
2016	"M.L.C" (featuring Booba)	46	—	—		Zifukoro
2016	"Elle avait son djo" (featuring Maître Gims)	127	—	—		Zifukoro
2016	"Mauvais payeur" (featuring SCH)	128	—	—		Zifukoro
2016	"Cala boca" (featuring Gradur)	136	—	—		Zifukoro
2016	"Italia"	138	—	—		Zifukoro
2016	"L'ennemi" (featuring Kalash & Skaodi)	182	—	—		Zifukoro
2017	"Tuba Life" (featuring Booba)	2	9 (Ultratip*)	29	SNEP: Diamond	Commando
2017	"Medellin"	3	36 (Ultratip*)	30	SNEP: Diamond	Commando
2017	"Salé"	2	42	62	SNEP: Diamond	Commando
2017	"Story X"	4	—	—	SNEP: Platinum	Commando
2017	"Versus" (featuring MHD)	9	—	—	SNEP: Gold	Commando
2017	"Amour X"	13	—	—	SNEP: Platinum	Commando
2017	"Ah bon?"	6	—	—	SNEP: Gold	Commando
2017	"Snapchat"	8	—	—	SNEP: Gold	Commando
2017	"La wewer"	7	—	—	SNEP: Gold	Commando
2017	"H&M"	20	—	—	SNEP: Gold	Commando
2017	"Twerk dans l'binks"	12	—	—	SNEP: Gold	Commando
2017	"Favélas" (featuring Skaodi)	14	—	—	SNEP: Gold	Commando
2017	"D.M.B"	24	—	—		Commando
2018	"Country"	23	—	—	SNEP: Gold	
2019	"Vrai"	7	—	—		Mr Sal
2019	"Siliconé"	4	—	—	SNEP: Platinum	Mr Sal
2019	"Bâtiment"	2	—	40	SNEP: Diamond	Mr Sal
2019	"Mendoza"	6	—	—	SNEP: Gold	Mr Sal
2019	"Tous les couler" (featuring Koba LaD)	10	—	—		Mr Sal
2019	"Valise"	16	—	—		Mr Sal
2019	"Méchant" (featuring Ninho)	1	—	24		Mr Sal
2019	"Mr Sal"	3	—	41	SNEP: Gold	Mr Sal
2019	"Moula" (featuring Heuss l'Enfoiré)	9	—	—		Mr Sal
2019	"Hasta luego"	11	—	—		Mr Sal
2019	"Stop"	15	—	—		Mr Sal
2019	"Tellement gang"	20	—	—		Mr Sal
2019	"J'suis dans les wayes"	22	—	—		Mr Sal
2019	"Manu le Coq" (featuring Skaodi)	25	—	—		Mr Sal
2019	"Des flingues et des roses"	26	—	—		Mr Sal
2019	"Bon déjà"	99	—	—		Mr Sal
2020	"Monter le son" (with DJ Kayz)	50	—	—		
2021	"Bolivienne"	71	—	—		
2021	"De bon matin" (feat. Guy2Bezbar)	21	—	—		
2021	"Blue Magic" (featuring Maes)	—	47	61		Le monde est méchant
2021	"Jota" (featuring Hamza)	10	44	54		Le monde est méchant
2021	"N.I" (featuring Ninho)	2	16	19		Le monde est méchant
2024	"Collabo" (with Ninho)	4	—	—		GOAT
2024	"Boucherie" (with Ninho)	5	—	—		GOAT
2024	"Jungle" (with Ninho)	7	—	—		GOAT
2024	"Ghetto Star" (with Ninho)	13	—	—		GOAT
2024	"Malsain" (with Ninho)	14	—	—		GOAT
2024	"Guitare" (with Ninho)	15	—	—		GOAT
2024	"Waribana" (with Ninho)	16	—	—	SNEP: Gold	GOAT
2024	"Haq" (with Ninho)	22	—	—		GOAT
2024	"Du Sal" (with Ninho)	23	—	—		GOAT
2024	"Broly" (with Ninho)	24	—	—		GOAT
2024	"Opinel 12" (with Ninho)	25	—	—		GOAT
2024	"Authentique" (with Ninho)	26	—	—		GOAT
2024	"Loin D'eux" (with Niska)	39	—	—		GOAT

*Did not appear in the official Belgian Ultratop 50 charts, but rather in the bubbling under Ultratip charts.

=== As featured artist ===
Year	Title	Peak positions			Certifications	Album
Year	Title	FRA	BEL (Wa)	SWI	Certifications	Album
2015	"Sapés comme jamais" (Maître Gims featuring Niska)	3	2	—	BEA: Gold; SNEP: Diamond	Maître Gims album Mon cœur avait raison
2015	"Philly" (Gradur featuring Niska)	138	—	—		Gradur mixtape ShegueyVara Vol. 2
2016	"Elle a mal" (Ninho featuring Niska)	196	—	—		
2017	"Walou" (KeBlack featuring Niska)	118	—	—		KeBlack album Premier étage
2017	"En leuleu" (Sadek featuring Niska)	49	28 (Ultratip*)	—	SNEP: Gold	Sadek album #VVRDL
2017	"Koussi koussa" (Kalash featuring Niska)	52	—	—	SNEP: Gold	Kalash album Mwaka Moon
2017	"Sous contrôle" (Dadju featuring Niska)	19	19 (Ultratip*)	—	SNEP: Gold	Dadju album Gentleman 2.0
2017	"Ça va aller" (Booba featuring Niska & Sidiki Diabaté)	9	—	—	SNEP: Gold	Booba album Trône
2018	"Zoum" (Soprano featuring Niska)	42	41	—	SNEP: Gold	Soprano album Phoenix
2018	"Sucette" (Aya Nakamura featuring Niska)	4	—	—	SNEP: Gold	Aya Nakamura album Nakamura
2019	"Maman ne le sait pas" (Ninho featuring Niska)	2	24	44	SNEP: Platinum	Ninho album Destin
2019	"Vréalité" (Kekra feat. Niska)	38	—	—		Kekra album L'affranchi
2019	"RR 9.1" (Koba LaD featuring Niska)	3	25	75	SNEP: Diamond	Koba LaD album L'affranchi
2019	"Liquide" (Shay featuring Niska)	21	—	—	SNEP: Gold	Shay album Antidote
2019	"Méchant Sheguey" (Gradur featuring Niska)	85	—	—		Gradur album Zone 59
2019	"MD" (4Keus featuring Niska)	21	—	75	SNEP: Diamond	4Keus album Vie d'artiste
2020	"Criminel" (Bramsito featuring Niska)	5	—	86		SNEP: Gold
2020	"Nouveaux riches" (Leto featuring Niska)	17	—	—		Leto album 100 visages
2020	"Tieks" (13 Block featuring Niska)	18	16 (Ultratip*)	—		13 Block album BLO II
2020	"On sait jamais" (PLK featuring Niska)	3	46	37	SNEP: Gold	PLK album Enna
2020	"Joli bébé" (Naza featuring Niska)	2	17	19	SNEP: Diamond	Naza album Gros bébé
2020	"Tu paniques" (Kalash Criminel featuring Niska)	24	—	—		Kalash Criminel; Sélection naturelle
2020	"Millions d'euros" (Landy featuring Niska)	7	—	—		Landy album A-One
2022	"Allez dehors" (Fresh featuring Niska)	12	24	—		
2022	"Balader" (Soolking featuring Niska)	2	22	72		
2023	"Rebelote" (featuring Niska and IDS)	75	—	—		
2023	"Sans Coeur" (Shay featuring Niska)	5	—	—		

*Did not appear in the official Belgian Ultratop 50 charts, but rather in the bubbling under Ultratip charts.
