= Gambi (rapper) =

French rapper

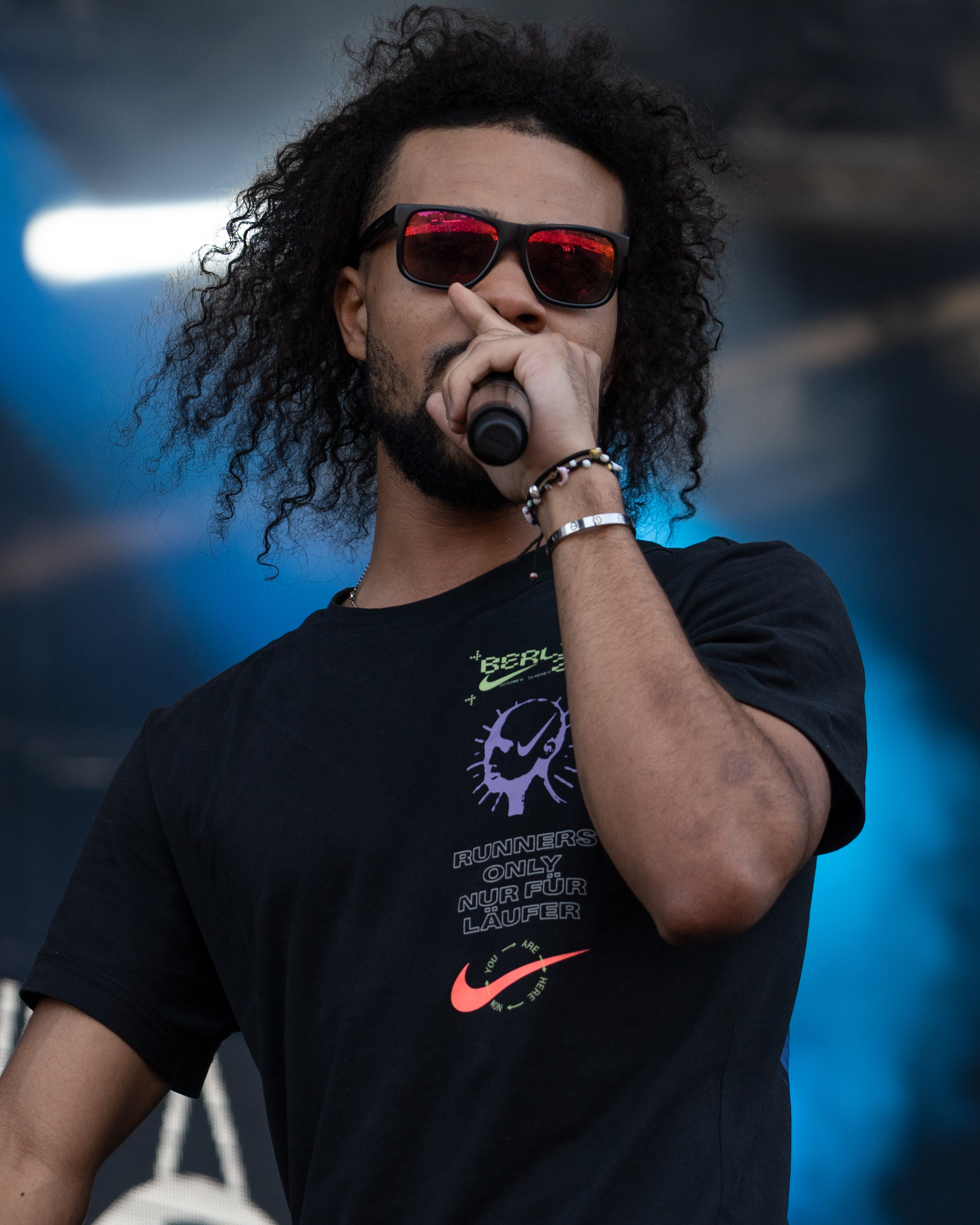

Background information
- Born: Camille Djamal M’Babou
- Origin: Fontenay-sous-Bois, Île-de-France, France
- Genres: French rap, hip hop, trap
- Occupation: Rapper
- Years active: 2018–present
- Label: Rec. 118

Gambi is a French rapper and hip hop artist from Fontenay-sous-Bois. His 2019 singles "Hé oh" and "Popopop" have both topped SNEP, the French Singles Chart. Gambi started his music career in 2018 with a series of Makak clips on YouTube. In May 2019, he was signed to the label Rec. 118, an affiliate of Warner Music France. In 2019 edition of Paris Fashion Week, he became the face of the brand AfterHomeWork.

== Discography ==
=== Albums ===
Title	Details	Peak chart positions		
Title	Details	FRA	BEL (Wa)	SWI
La vie est belle	Released: 10 July 2020; Label: Warner Music France; Formats: Digital download, streaming	1	1	7
N'a stragia	Released: 9 June 2023; Label: Rec. 118, Warner Music France; Formats: Digital download, streaming	5	75	—

=== Singles ===
Title	Year	Peak positions				Album
Title	Year	FRA	BEL (Fl)	BEL (Wa)	SWI	Album
"Hé oh"	2019	1	Tip	13	43	La vie est belle
"Popopop"	2019	1	18* (Ultratip)	3	15	La vie est belle
"La Guenav"	2019	47	—	15* (Ultratip)	—	Non-album singles
"Stevez" (with TK)	2019	26	—	Tip	—	Non-album singles
"Dans l'espace" (featuring Heuss l'Enfoiré)	2020	1	—	15	28	Non-album singles
"Macintosh"	2020	5	—	—	—	La vie est belle
"Petete"	2022	1	—	14	28	Non-album singles
"Bonjour" (with NLE Choppa)	2023	23	—	—	100	Non-album singles
"Tentation" (featuring Hamza)	2024	19	—	50	—	Non-album singles
"René Caovilla"	2026	5	—	—	—	Non-album singles

*Did not appear in the official Belgian Ultratop 50 charts, but rather in the bubbling under Ultratip charts.

=== Featured in ===
Title	Year	Peak positions	Album
Title	Year	FRA	Album
"Bouge-moi de là" (Jul feat. Gips, Houari GP, Le K, Gambi, TK, Moubarak, Miklo, A-Deal & Kamikaz)	2019	52	C'est pas des lol
"Gasolina" (Hamza feat. Gambi)	2019	27	Santa Sauce 2
"Chihuahua" (Soolking feat. Gambi)	2020	65	Vintage
"Servis" (Squeezie feat. Gambi)	2020	120	

=== Other charted songs ===
Title	Year	Peak positions	Album
Title	Year	FRA	Album
"Oulalah"	2019	126	
"Tout doux"	2019	94	La relève
"Puf puf puf"	2020	9	La vie est belle
"On s'taille"	2020	27	La vie est belle
"J'deviens fou"	2020	46	La vie est belle
"Vivre"	2020	77	La vie est belle
"Festival"	2020	78	La vie est belle
"Ouh"	2020	79	La vie est belle
"Côte d'Azur"	2020	102	La vie est belle
"Bienvenue"	2020	108	La vie est belle
"La vie est belle"	2020	111	La vie est belle
"Merci la hess"	2020	119	La vie est belle
"Loin d'ici"	2020	170	La vie est belle
"Paris la nuit"	2020	192	La vie est belle
