= List of artists who reached number one on the French Singles Chart =

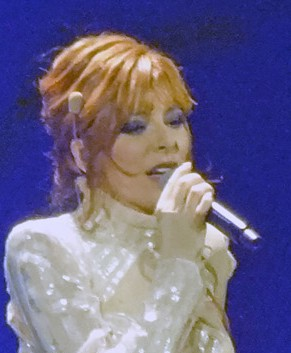
Mylène Farmer is the artist who has the most number-one hits in France with 15

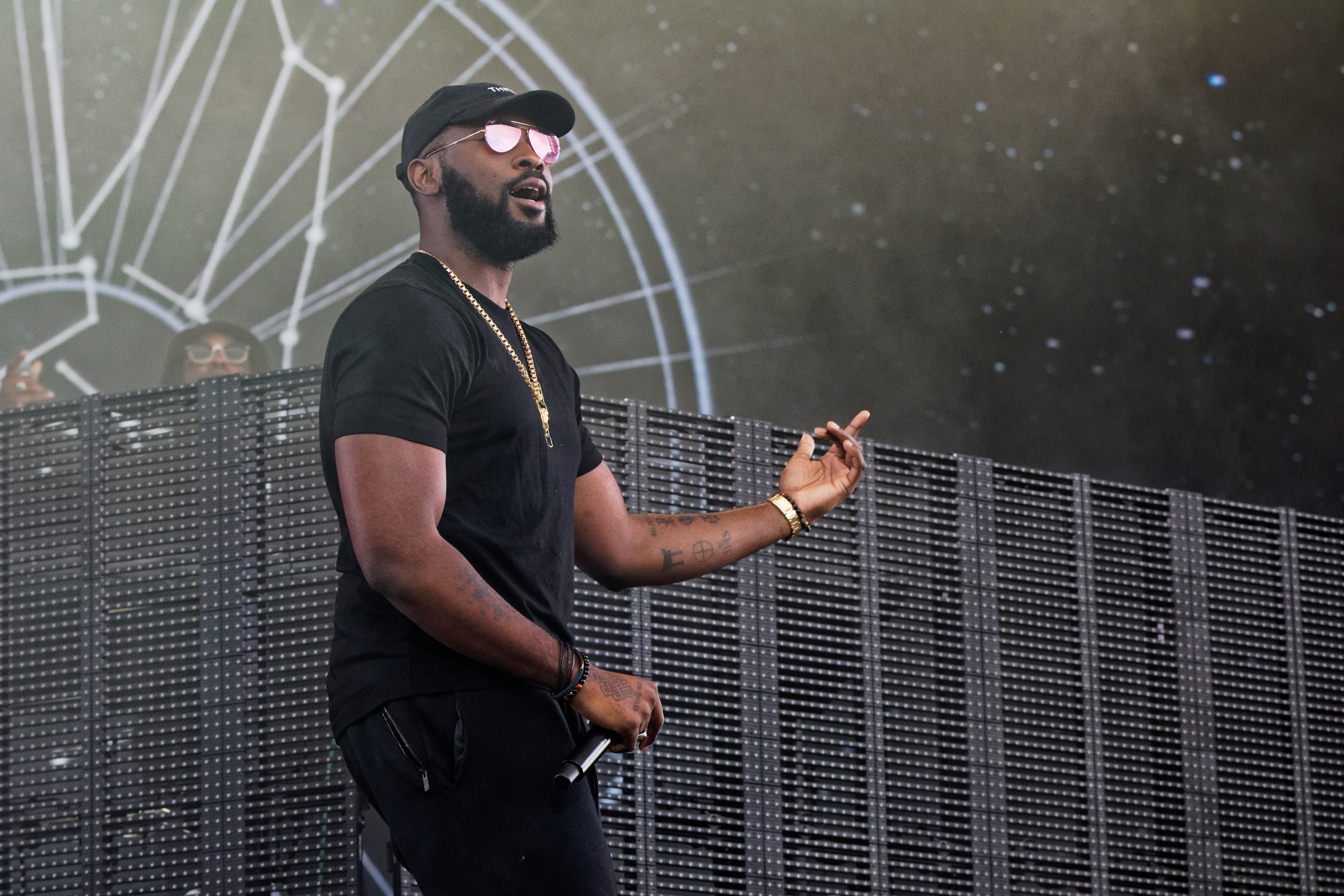
Damso holds the record for the most number-one songs by a male artist with 14.

== List inclusion ==
- All acts are listed alphabetically.
- Solo artists are alphabetized by last name (unless they use only their first name, e.g. Alizée, listed under A), Groups by group name excluding "A," "An", "The" (in English), "Le", "La" and "Les" (in French).
- Featurings are also listed if they appear on the cover of the single.
- All artists are listed separately, unless their names are inextricably linked (e.g. MC Miker G & DJ Sven).

== 0–9 ==
Artist	Country	Number-one single(s)	Year	Weeks at #1
2 Unlimited	Netherlands	"No Limit"	1993	5
20 Fingers	United States	"Short Dick Man"	1994	3

== A ==
Artist	Country	Number-one single(s)	Year	Weeks at #1
Ace of Base	Sweden	"Happy Nation"	1993	4
Adams, Bryan	Canada	"(Everything I Do) I Do It for You"	1991	8
Adams, Bryan	Canada	"Please Forgive Me"	1993	2
Adele	United Kingdom	"Someone like You"	2011	4
Adele	United Kingdom	"Skyfall"	2012	6
Adele	United Kingdom	"Hello"	2015	12
Alizée	France	"L'Alizé"	2000	2
Alonzo	France	"Tout va bien"	2022	5
Alonzo	France	"Petit Génie"	2023	18
Amine	Morocco	"J'voulais"	2006	4
Angèle	Belgium	"Tout oublier"	2019	2
Angèle	Belgium	"Fever"	2020	6
Antonn, Kareen	France	"Si demain... (Turn Around)"	2004	10
Aqua	Denmark/Norway	"Barbie Girl"	1997	1
Audin, Jean-Philippe	France	"Song of Ocarina"	1991	2
Avalanche	Norway	"Johnny Johnny Come Home"	1989	8
Aventura	United States	"Obsesión"	2004	7
Avicii	Sweden	"Wake Me Up"	2013	2
Aznavour, Charles	France	"Pour toi Arménie"	1989	10

== B ==
Artist	Country	Number-one single(s)	Year	Weeks at #1
B.o.B.	United States	"Price Tag"	2011	1
Babylon Zoo	United Kingdom	"Spaceman"	1996	1
Bad Bunny	United States	"DTMF"	2025	1
Bakermat	Netherlands	"Vandaag"	2013	1
Badi, Chimène	France	"Entre nous"	2003	2
Balavoine, Daniel	France	"L'Aziza"	1986	8
Baldé, William	Guinea	"Rayon de soleil"	2008	9
Baltimora	Italy	"Tarzan Boy"	1985	5
Baquet, Grégori	France	"Les Rois du monde"	2000	17
Barbelivien, Didier	France	"À toutes les filles..."	1990	2
Barbelivien, Didier	France	"Il faut laisser le temps au temps"	1991	2
Barney, Phil	France	"Un enfant de toi"	2002	3
Beatles, The	United Kingdom	"Michelle"	1966	5
Beatles, The	United Kingdom	"Hello Goodbye"	1968	4
Beatles, The	United Kingdom	"Lady Madonna"	1968	1
Beatles, The	United Kingdom	" Let It Be "	1970	4
Bega, Lou	Germany	"Mambo No. 5 (A Little Bit of...)"	1999	20
Bénabar	France	"Un arc en ciel"	2013	1
Bent, Amel	France	"Ma Philosophie"	2005	6
Beyoncé	United States	"Beautiful Liar"	2007	2
Bieber, Justin	Canada	"Baby"	2010	2
Bieber, Justin	Canada	"Let Me Love You"	2016	1
Black Eyed Peas, The	United States	"Shut Up"	2004	1
Black Eyed Peas, The	United States	"Just Can't Get Enough"	2011	4
Blige, Mary J.	United States	"Family Affair"	2001	1
Bocelli, Andrea	Italy	"Con te partirò"	1997	5
Bocelli, Andrea	Italy	"Vivo per lei (je vis pour elle)"	1998	5
Booba	France	"OKLM"	2014	1
Booba	France	"E.L.E.P.H.A.N.T"	2016	1
Booba	France	"DKR"	2016	1
Booba	France	"Madrina"	2018	2
Booba	France	"Sale Mood"	2019	1
Booba	France	"PGP"	2019	1
Booba	France	"Médicament"	2019	1
Booba	France	"Arc-en-Ciel"	2019	1
Booba	France	"Jauné"	2020	2
Booba	France	"5G"	2020	1
Booba	France	"Ratpi World"	2021	2
Booba	France	"Mona Lisa"	2021	2
Boney M	Germany	"Megamix"	1989	6
Benson Boone	United States	"Beautiful Things"	2024	5
Boris	France	"Soirée disco"	1996	1
Bosh	France	"Djomb"	2020	5
David Bowie	United Kingdom	"Space Oddity"	2016	1
Naughty Boy	United Kingdom	"Runnin' (Lose It All)"	2017	1
Bramsito	France	"Sale Mood"	2019	1
Bratisla Boys	France	"Stach Stach"	2002	10
Brown, Alphonse	France	"Le Frunkp"	2003	7
Bruel, Patrick	France	"Qui a le droit... (live)"	1991	7
Bruel, Patrick	France	"Un arc en ciel"	2013	1
Burna Boy	Nigeria	"Dai Dai"	2026	9

== C ==
Artist	Country	Number-one single(s)	Year	Weeks at #1
C2C	France	"Down the Road"	2012	1
Camila Cabello	United States	"Havana"	2018	2
Cali	France	"Un arc en ciel"	2013	1
Carbonne	France	"Imagine"	2024	7
Carrapicho	Brazil	"Tic, Tic Tac"	1996	3
Mariah Carey	United States	"All I Want for Christmas Is You"	2018,2022 and 2023	3
Caroliina	France	"Mafiosa"	2018	5
Cascada	Germany	"Miracle"	2006	1
Cauet	France	"Zidane y va marquer"	2006	2
Central Cee	United Kingdom	"Let Go"	2022	1
Central Cee	United Kingdom	"Eurostar"	2023	2
Century	France	"Lover Why"	1985	7
Chanteurs sans Frontières	France	"Éthiopie"	1995	8
Chaplin, Charlie	United Kingdom	"Modern Times"^{1}	2004	1
Cheela	Africa	"Laisse parler les gens"	2003	3
Cher	United States	"Believe"	1999	1
Cherry, Neneh	Sweden	"7 Seconds"	1994	16
Christians, The	United Kingdom	"Words"	1990	2
Ch'ti DJ	France	"Hé, biloute ! Monte l'son ! Hein !"	2008	1
CKay	Nigeria	"Love Nwantiti (Ah Ah Ah)"	2021	5
Le Classico Organisé	France	"Loi de la Calle"	2021	1
Le Classico Organisé	France	"Le Classico Organisé"	2021	2
Cliff, Jimmy	Jamaica	"I Can See Clearly Now"	1994	3
Cœur de pirate	Canada	"Pour un infidèle"	2010	1
Leonard Cohen	Canada	"Hallelujah"	2016	1
Collectif Métissé	France	"Debout pour danser"	2010	1
Coolio	United States	"Gangsta's Paradise"	1995	13
Freeze Corleone	France	"Mannschaft"	2021	1
Corley, Al	United States	"Square Rooms"	1985	5
Cranberries, The	Ireland	"Zombie"	1994	9
Crazy Frog	Sweden	"Axel F"	2005	13
Crazy Frog	Sweden	"Popcorn"	2005	7
Crazy Frog	Sweden	"We Are the Champions (Ding a Dang Dong)"	2006	5
Miley Cyrus	United States	"Flowers"	2023	8

== D ==
Artist	Country	Number-one single(s)	Year	Weeks at #1
D'Avilla, Philippe	France	"Les Rois du monde"	2000	17
Dadju	France			
Dadju	France	"Jaloux	2018	5
Dadju	France	"Grand bain"	2020	1
Daft Punk	France	"One More Time"	2000	1
Daft Punk	France	"Get Lucky"	2013	8
Daft Punk	France	"Starboy"	2016	1
Daft Punk	France	"I Feel It Coming"	2017	1
Damso	Congo/Belgium	"Mwaka Moon"	2017	8
Damso	Congo/Belgium	"Ipséité"	2018	1
Damso	Congo/Belgium	"Smog"	2018	1
Damso	Congo/Belgium	"Rêves bizarres"	2018	2
Damso	Congo/Belgium	"Tricheur"	2019	2
Damso	Congo/Belgium	"Σ. Morose"	2021	1
Damso	Congo/Belgium	"Dégaine"	2022	2
Damso	Congo/Belgium	"Rencontre"	2022	4
Damso	Congo/Belgium	"Nocif"	2023	3
Damso	Congo/Belgium	"Coeur de ice"	2023	1
Damso	Congo/Belgium	"La rue"	2023	2
Damso	Congo/Belgium	"Pyramide"	2024	1
Damso	Congo/Belgium	"Alpha"	2024	1
Damso	Congo/Belgium	"Triple V"	2025	1
Dave	United Kingdom	"Meridan"	2023	2
Abou Debeing	France	"Petit Génie"	2023	18
Début de Soirée	France	"Nuit de folie"	1988	9
Desvarieux, Jacob	France	"Laisse parler les gens"^{1}	2003	3
Diam's	Cyprus	"La Boulette"	2006	3
Dinos	France	"Moins Un"	2020	1
Dion, Céline	Canada	"Pour que tu m'aimes encore"	1995	12
Dion, Céline	Canada	"Je sais pas"	1995	7
Dion, Céline	Canada	"The Reason" / "My Heart Will Go On"	1998	13
Dion, Céline	Canada	"Sous le vent"	2001	3
Dion, Céline	Canada	"Et s'il n'en restait qu'une (je serais celle-là)"	2007	1
Dion, Céline	Canada	"Encore un soir"	2016	4
Dire Straits	United Kingdom	"Encores (EP)"	1993	6
Disiz	France	"Rencontre"	2022	4
Disiz	France	"Melodrama"	2025	28
DJ BoBo	Switzerland	"Chihuahua"	2003	10
DJ Snake	France	"Let Me Love You"	2016	1
DJ Snake	France	"Loco Contigo"	2019	1
Doré, Julien	France	"Pour un infidèle"	2010	1
Doré, Julien	France	"Le lac"	2016	1
Dosseh	France	"Habitué"	2018	4
Drake	Canada	"One Dance"	2016	1
Duval, Marlène	France	"Un enfant de toi"	2002	3
Dystinct	France	"Spider"	2024	7

== E ==
Artist	Country	Number-one single(s)	Year	Weeks at #1
East 17	United Kingdom	"It's Alright"	1994	1
Eiffel 65	Italy	"Blue (Da Ba Dee)"	1999	3
Eiffel 65	Italy	"Move Your Body"	2000	4
Elams	France	"Bande organisée"	2020	12
Elsa	France	"T'en va pas"	1986	8
Elsa	France	"Un Roman d'amitié"	1988	6
Roméo Elvis	Belgium	"Tout oublier"	2019	2
Eminem	United States	"The Monster"	2013	3
Enigma	Germany	"Sadeness (Part I)"	1990	5
Imen Es	France	"Petit Génie"	2023	18
Europe	Sweden	"The Final Countdown"	1986	8
Eva	France	"On Fleek"	2019	1

== F ==
Artist	Country	Number-one single(s)	Year	Weeks at #1
Farmer, Mylène	France	"Pourvu qu'elles soient douces"	1988	5
Farmer, Mylène	France	"Désenchantée"	1991	9
Farmer, Mylène	France	"XXL"	1995	1
Farmer, Mylène	France	"Slipping Away (Crier la vie)"	2006	1
Farmer, Mylène	France	"Dégénération"	2008	1
Farmer, Mylène	France	"Appelle mon numéro"	2008	1
Farmer, Mylène	France	"Si j'avais au moins..."	2009	1
Farmer, Mylène	France	"C'est dans l'air"	2009	1
Farmer, Mylène	France	"Sextonik"	2009	1
Farmer, Mylène	France	"Oui mais... non"	2010	3
Farmer, Mylène	France	"Bleu Noir"	2011	1
Farmer, Mylène	France	"Lonely Lisa"	2011	1
Farmer, Mylène	France	"À l'ombre"	2012	1
Farmer, Mylène	France	"Stolen Car"	2015	2
Farmer, Mylène	France	"City of Love"	2016	1
Fatal Bazooka	France	"Fous ta cagoule"	2006	8
Fatal Bazooka	France	"Mauvaise foi nocturne"	2007	5
Fatal Bazooka	France	"Parle à ma main"	2007	7
Faudel	France	"Mon Pays"	2006	1
Feder	France	"Goodbye"	2015	6
Feldman, François	France	"Les Valses de Vienne"	1989	6
Feldman, François	France	"Petit Frank"	1990	3
Feldman, François	France	"Joy"	1992	8
Félicien	France	"Cum-cum mania"	2002	1
Alex Ferrari	Brazil	"Bara Bará Bere Berê"	2012	2
Fergie	United States	"Gettin' Over You"^{1}	2010	1
Fiori, Patrick	France	"Belle"	1998	18
Fiori, Patrick	France	"4 Mots sur un piano"	2007	2
FloyyMenor	Chile	"Gata Only"	2024	1
Luis Fonsi	United States	"Despacito"	2017	18
Frager, Tom	France	"Lady Melody"	2009	4
Fresh	France	"Chop"	2022	3
Franglish	France	"Boucan"	2024	1
Freshlyground	South Africa	"Waka Waka (This Time for Africa)"^{1}	2010	6
Fritz, Helmut	France	"Ça m'énerve"	2009	4
Fugees, The	United States	"Killing Me Softly"	1996	5
Furtado, Nelly	Canada	"Say It Right"	2007	1

== G ==
Artist	Country	Number-one single(s)	Year	Weeks at #1
G.O.Culture	France	"Darla dirladada"	1993	5
Lady Gaga	United States	"Poker Face"	2008	4
Lady Gaga	United States	"Bad Romance"	2010	1
Lady Gaga	United States	"Perfect Illusion"	2016	1
Gala	Italy	"Freed from Desire"	1996	13
Gala	Italy	"Let a Boy Cry"	1997	2
Gambi	France	"Hé oh"	2019	2
Gambi	France	"Popopop"	2019	5
Gambi	France	"Dans l'espace"	2020	3
Gambi	France	"Petete"	2022	1
Pierre Garnier	France	"Ceux Qu'On Était	2024	4
Garou	Canada	"Belle"	1998	18
Garou	Canada	"Seul"	2001	11
Garou	Canada	"Sous le vent"	2001	3
Garou	Canada	"La Rivière de notre enfance"	2004	5
Gaulois	France	"Jolie"	2023	1
Gazo	France	"Filtré"	2022	2
Gazo	France	"Celine 3x"	2022	1
Gazo	France	"Die"	2022	13
Gazo	France	"C'est carré le S"	2023	1
Gazo	France	"Casanova"	2023	6
Gazo	France	"Notre Dame"	2023	1
Gazo	France	"Nanani Nanana"	2024	7
Gillette	United States	"Short Dick Man"^{1}	1994	3
Gims	Congo/France	"J'me tire"	2013	4
Gims	Congo/France	"Game Over"	2013	1
Gims	Congo/France	"La même"	2018	1
Gims	Congo/France	"Spider"	2024	7
Gims	Congo/France	"Sois pas timide"	2024	7
Gims	Congo/France	"Ciel"	2025	6
Gims	Congo/France	"Ninao"	2025	7
Gims	Congo/France	"Air Force blanche"	2025	3
Gims	Congo/France	"Parisienne"	2025	6
Gims	Congo/France	"Un Monde à L'Autre"	2025	2
Gold	France	"Capitaine abandonné"	1986	4
Goldman, Jean-Jacques	France	"Je te donne"	1985	8
Goldman, Jean-Jacques	France	"4 Mots sur un piano"	2007	2
Gotye	Australia	"Somebody That I Used to Know"	2012	9
GP Explorer	France	"Un Monde à L'Autre"	2025	2
Gradur	France	"Ne reviens pas	2019	9
Gray, Félix	France	"À toutes les filles..."	1990	2
Gray, Félix	France	"Il faut laisser le temps au temps"	1991	2
Guetta, David	France	"Gettin' Over You"	2010	1
Guetta, David	France	"Sweat"^{1}	2011	2
Guetta, David	France	"Dangerous"	2014	6
Guetta, David	France	"This One's For You"	2016	3
Guru Josh Project	United Kingdom	"Infinity 2008"	2008	2
Gwayav'	France	"Lady Melody"	2009	4

== H ==
Artist	Country	Number-one single(s)	Year	Weeks at #1
Haddaway	Trinidad and Tobago	"What Is Love"	1993	5
Halliwell, Geri	United Kingdom	"It's Raining Men"	2001	5
Hallyday, David	France	"High"	1988	5
Hallyday, David	France	"Tu ne m'as pas laissé le temps"	1999	1
Hallyday, Johnny	France	"Tous ensemble"	2002	1
Hallyday, Johnny	France	"Marie"	2003	3
Hallyday, Johnny	France	"Mon Plus Beau Noël"	2005	1
Hallyday, Johnny	France	"La Loi du silence"	2006	1
Hallyday, Johnny	France	"Ça n'finira jamais"	2008	2
Hallyday, Johnny	France	"Je te promets"	2017	2
Hamza	Morocco/Belgium	"Nocif"	2023	3
Hamza	Morocco/Belgium	"Kyky2bondy"	2025	6
Calvin Harris	United Kingdom	"Feels"	2017	2
Calvin Harris	United Kingdom	"Promises"	2018	1
Hatik	France	"Angela"	2020	2
Houari	France	"Bande organisée"	2020	12
Houston, Whitney	United States	"I Will Always Love You"	1992	8

== I ==
Artist	Country	Number-one single(s)	Year	Weeks at #1
IAM	France	"Je danse le Mia"	1994	8
Imany	France	"Don't Be So Shy" (Filatov & Karas Remix)	2016	1
Iglesias, Enrique	Spain	"Tired of Being Sorry (Laisse le destin l'emporter)"	2008	11
Iglesias, Enrique	Spain	"El Perdón"	2015	6
Images	France	"Les Démons de minuit"	1986	13
Inconnus, Les	France	"Auteuil, Neuilly, Passy (rap BCBG)"	1991	4
Indians Sacred Spirit	United States	"Yeha-Noha"	1995	6
Indochine	France	"J'ai demandé à la lune"	2002	1
Indochine	France	"La vie est belle"	2017	1

== J ==
Artist	Country	Number-one single(s)	Year	Weeks at #1
J-five	United States	"Modern Times"	2004	1
Jackson, Jermaine	United States	"When the Rain Begins to Fall"	1984	3
Jackson, Michael	United States	"Billie Jean"	1983	4
Jackson, Michael	United States	"Thriller"	1984	4
Jackson, Michael	United States	"Black or White"	1992	2
Jackson, Michael	United States	"Heal The World"	1995, 1996	2
Jackson, Michael	United States	"You Are Not Alone"	1995	2
Jackson, Michael	United States	"You Rock My World"	2001	3
Jain	France	"Come"	2016	1
Nicky Jam	United States	"El Perdón"	2015	6
Parson James	United States	"Stole the Show"	2015	1
J Balvin	Colombia	"Loco Contigo"	2019	1
Jean, Wyclef	Haiti	"Hips Don't Lie"^{1}	2006	1
Carly Rae Jepsen	Canada	"Call Me Maybe"	2012	11
Jessie J	United Kingdom	"Price Tag"	2011	1
Jigulina, Vika	Romania	"Stereo Love"	2009	4
Jive Bunny and the Mastermixers	United Kingdom	"Swing the Mood"	1989	5
John, Elton	United Kingdom	"Je Veux De La Tendresse"	1981	2
John, Elton	United Kingdom	"Sacrifice"	1990	3
John, Elton	United Kingdom	"Don't Let the Sun Go Down on Me"	1991	7
John, Elton	United Kingdom	"Can You Feel the Love Tonight"	1993	10
John, Elton	United Kingdom	"Something About the Way You Look Tonight" / "Candle in the Wind 1997"	1997	6
Jones, Michael	United Kingdom	"Je te donne"	1985	8
Jones, Tom	United Kingdom	"Sex Bomb"	2000	7
Jordy	France	"Dur dur d'être bébé!"	1992	15
Jordy	France	"Alison"	1993	5
Juanes	Colombia	"La Camisa Negra"	2005	2
Jul	France	"Toto et Ninetta"	2018	1
Jul	France	"Bande organisée"	2020	12
Jul	France	"Mother Fuck"	2020	3
Jul	France	"Phénoménal"	2025	1
Jul	France	"Air Force blanche"	2025	3
Jungeli	France	"Petit Génie"	2023	18

== K ==
Artist	Country	Number-one single(s)	Year	Weeks at #1
Kalash	France	"Mwaka Moon"	2017	1
Kalash	France	"Alpha"	2024	1
Israel Kamakawiwoʻole	Hawaii	"Somewhere Over the Rainbow/What a Wonderful World"	2010	10
Kamini	France	"Marly-Gomont"	2007	4
Kaoma	Brazil	"Lambada"	1989	12
Marina Kaye	France	"Homeless"	2015	2
Kayliah	France	"Qui est l'exemple ?"	2002	3
KeBlack	France	"Boucan"	2024	1
Kesha	United States	"Tik Tok"	2010	2
Khaled	Algeria	"Aïcha"	1996	1
Khaled	Algeria	"Même pas fatigué !!!"	2009	7
Kimbra	New Zealand	"Somebody That I Used to Know"	2012	9
K.Maro	Canada	"Femme Like U (Donne-moi ton corps)"	2004	1
Kofs	France	"Bande organisée"	2020	12
Koxie	France	"Garçon"	2007	7
Kungs	France	"This Girl"	2016	2
Kygo	Norway	"Stole the Show"	2015	1

== L ==
Artist	Country	Number-one single(s)	Year	Weeks at #1
L5	France	"Toutes les femmes de ta vie"	2001	1
L.E.J	France	"Summer 2015"	2015	2
L.V.	United States	"Gangsta's Paradise"^{1}	1995	13
Labylle, Jocelyne	Guadeloupe	"Laisse parler les gens"	2003	3
Lafontaine, Philippe	Belgium	"Cœur de loup"	1989	2
Lagaf'	France	"Bo le lavabo (WC Kiss)"	1990	1
Lagaf'	France	"La Zoubida"	1991	11
Lahaye, Jean-Luc	France	"Papa chanteur"	1986	1
Lalanne, Francis	France	"On se retrouvera"	1987	6
Larage, Faf	France	"Pas le temps"	2006	6
Larusso	France	"Tu m'oublieras"	1999	12
Las Ketchup	Spain	"Aserejé (The Ketchup Song)"	2002	11
Lartiste	France	"Mafiosa"	2018	5
Lartiste	France	"On Fleek"	2019	1
Lavoie, Daniel	Canada	"Belle"	1998	18
Lavoine, Marc	France	"J'ai tout oublié"	2002	2
Lee, Jena	France	"J'aimerais tellement"	2009	11
Lee, Rita	Brazil	"Lança Perfume"	1981	1
Heuss l'Enfoiré	France	"Khapta"	2019	3
Heuss l'Enfoiré	France	"Ne reviens pas"	2019-2020	9
Heuss l'Enfoiré	France	"Dans l'espace"	2020	3
Lemarchal, Grégory	France	"De temps en temps"	2007	1
Leroy, Nolwenn	France	"Cassé"	2003	2
Leroy, Nolwenn	France	"Nolwenn Ohwo!"	2006	1
Lewis, Charles D.	Barbados	"Soca Dance"	1990	6
Lewis, Leona	United Kingdom	"Bleeding Love"	2008	1
Licence IV	France	"Viens boire un p'tit coup à la maison"	1987	13
Lil Nas X	United States	"Old Town Road"	2019	8
Lil Nas X	United States	"Montero (Call Me by Your Name)"	2021	3
Lilly Wood and the Prick	Israel	"Prayer in C"	2014	15
Gusttavo Lima	Brazil	"Balada"	2012	2
Linkup	France	"Mon étoile"	2003	3
Dua Lipa	United Kingdom/Albania	"Fever"	2020	6
LMFAO	United States	"Gettin' Over You"^{1}	2010	1
LMFAO	United States	"Party Rock Anthem"	2011	9
Lomepal	France	"Trop beau"	2018	1
Louane	France	"Avenir"	2015	2
Lobos, Los	United States	"La Bamba"	1987	11
Loconte, Mikelangelo	Italy	"Tatoue-moi"	2009	5
Lofteurs, Les	France	"Up and Down"	2001	7
Jennifer Lopez	United States	"On the Floor"	2011	1
Lorie	France	"Sur un air latino"	2003	2
Lorna	Panama	"Papi chulo... (te traigo el mmmm...)"	2003	1
Los Del Rio	Spain	"Macarena"	1996	7
Lossa	France	"Petit Génie"	2023	18
LP	United States	"Lost on You"	2016	6
Ludacris	United States	"Baby"^{1}	2010	2
Luiza	France	"Bleu Soleil"	2025	5
Luna, Sherifa	France	"Quelque part"	2007	4
Luna, Sherifa	France	"Il avait les mots"	2008	8
Lyse	France	"Goodbye"	2015	6

== M ==
Artist	Country	Number-one single(s)	Year	Weeks at #1
Black M	France	"Sur Ma Route"	2014	4
Melissa M	France	"Elle"	2007	1
Macklemore & Ryan Lewis	United States	"Thrift Shop"	2013	4
Madcon	Norway	"Beggin"	2008	7
Mad Stuntman, The	Trinidad and Tobago	"I Like to Move It"^{1}	1994	5
Madonna	United States	"La Isla Bonita"	1986	3
Madonna	United States	"Don't Cry for Me Argentina"	1997	4
Madonna	United States	"Hung Up"	2005	5
Maes	France	"Madrina"	2018	2
Maes	France	"Galactic"	2023	1
Magic System	Ivory Coast	"Même pas fatigué !!!"	2009	7
Maé, Christophe	France	"On s'attache"	2007	1
Maé, Christophe	France	"Dingue, dingue, dingue"	2010	3
Maná	Mexico	"Baila morena"	2006	4
Manau	France	"La Tribu de Dana"	1998	12
Manau	France	"Mais qui est la belette ?"	1999	1
La Mano 1.9	France	"Parisienne"	2025	6
La Mano 1.9	France	"Un Monde à L'Autre"	2025	2
Marocco, Cristina	France	"J'ai tout oublié"	2002	2
Soso Maness	France	"Bande organisée"	2020	12
Soso Maness	France	"Petrouchka"	2021	6
Bruno Mars	United States	"Uptown Funk"	2014	10
Bruno Mars	United States	"24K Magic"	2016	2
Martin, Ricky	Puerto Rico	"María"	1997	9
Martin, Ricky	Puerto Rico	"La Copa de la Vida"	1998	6
Mas, Jeanne	France	"Johnny, Johnny"	1985	4
Mas, Jeanne	France	"En Rouge et Noir"	1985	2
Matador, Jessy	Democratic Republic of the Congo	"Allez Ola Olé"	2010	5
Mauvais Djo	France	"Pilé"	2026	3
Mauvais Djo	France	"Maladie"	2026	2
Maya, Edward	Romania	"Stereo Love"	2009	4
MC Miker G & DJ Sven	Netherlands	"Holiday Rap"	1986	2
MC Solaar	France	"Hasta la Vista"	2001	5
MC Solaar	France	"Inch'Allah"	2002	4
Mecano	Spain	"Une femme avec une femme"	1990	7
Medeiros, Glenn	United States	"Nothing's Gonna Change My Love for You"	1988	8
Medeiros, Glenn	United States	"Un Roman d'amitié"	1988	6
Mercury, Freddie	United Kingdom	"Living on My Own"	1993	15
Alice Merton	Germany	"No Roots"	2017	2
Michael, George	United Kingdom	"Don't Let the Sun Go Down on Me"	1991	7
Milky Chance	Germany	"Stolen Dance"	2014	3
Mika	United Kingdom	"Relax, Take It Easy"	2007	2
Mika	United Kingdom	"Elle me dit"	2011	5
Miles, Robert	Switzerland, Italy	"Children"	1996	11
Minogue, Kylie	Australia	"Can't Get You Out of My Head"	2001	1
Mitrecey, Ilona	France	"Un monde parfait"	2005	15
Cris MJ	Chile	"Gata Only"	2024	1
Moby	United States	"Slipping Away (Crier la vie)"	2006	1
Modena, Diego	France	"Song of Ocarina"	1991	2
Moha K	France	"Vroum Vroum"	2021	1
Moos	France	"Au nom de la rose"	1999	9
Mousse T.	Germany	"Sex Bomb"	2000	7

== N ==
Artist	Country	Number-one single(s)	Year	Weeks at #1
N'Dour, Youssou	Senegal	"7 Seconds"	1994	16
Nâdiya	France	"Tired of Being Sorry"^{1}	2008	11
Aya Nakamura	France	"Djadja"	2018	2
Aya Nakamura	France	"Copines"	2018	1
Aya Nakamura	France	"Jolie nana"	2020	4
Aya Nakamura	France	"Plus jamais"	2020	1
Aya Nakamura	France	"Dégaine"	2022	2
Aya Nakamura	France	"Sexy Nana"	2026	4
Naps	France	"6.3"	2020	2
Naps	France	"Bande organisée"	2020	12
Naps	France	"La Kiffance"	2021	10
Naps	France	"Tout va bien"	2022	5
Naps	France	"C'est carré le S"	2023	1
Nekfeu	France	"Tricheur"	2019	2
Nekfeu	France	"Moins Un"	2020	1
Ninho	France	"Air Max"	2018	3
Ninho	France	"Goutte d'eau"	2019	4
Ninho	France	"Méchant"	2019	1
Ninho	France	"6.3"	2020	2
Ninho	France	"Lettre à une femme"	2020	6
Ninho	France	"Grand bain"	2020	1
Ninho	France	"C'est carré le S"	2023	1
Ninho	France	"Jefe"	2021	9
Ninho	France	"Tout va bien"	2022	5
Ninho	France	"Jolie"	2023	1
Ninho	France	"Freestyle Lvl Up 1"	2023	1
Ninho	France	"Eurostar"	2023	2
Ninho	France	"Triple V"	2025	1
Nirvana	United States	"Smells Like Teen Spirit"	1992	4
Niska	France	"Médicament"	2019	1
Niska	France	"Méchant"	2019	1
Noah, Yannick	France	"Aux arbres citoyens"	2007	3
No Limit	France	"La Rue"	2023	2

== O ==
Artist	Country	Number-one single(s)	Year	Weeks at #1
Obispo, Pascal	France	"Fan"	2003	1
Obispo, Pascal	France	"Mauvaise foi nocturne"^{1,2}	2007	5
Oboy	France	"TDB"	2021	5
Ofenbach	France	"Katchi"	2017	4
Omi	Jamaica	"Cheerleader"	2015	10
One Direction	United Kingdom	"Drag Me Down"	2015	1
Opus	Austria	"Live Is Life"	1985	7
Ora Maté	France	"Kamate"	2007	1
Orelsan	France	"Rêves bizarres"	2018	2
Orelsan	France	"L'odeur de l'essence"	2021	1
Orelsan	France	"Jour Meilleur"	2021	1
Richard Orlinski	France	"Heartbeat"	2016	3
O-Zone	Moldova	"Dragostea din tei"	2004	15

== P ==
Artist	Country	Number-one single(s)	Year	Weeks at #1
Paco	Vietnam	"Amor de mis amores"	1988	5
Pagny, Florent	France	"N'importe quoi"	1988	8
Pagny, Florent	France	"Savoir aimer"	1997	9
Pagny, Florent	France	"Ma liberté de penser"	2003	6
Pakito	France	"Living on Video"	2004	4
Paradis, Vanessa	France	"Joe le taxi"	1987	11
Parker Jr., Ray	United States	"Ghostbusters"	1984	5
Parker, Tony	France	"Balance-toi"	2007	1
Passi	France	"Laisse parler les gens"^{1}	2003	3
Patti, Guesch	France	"Étienne"	1987	5
Pep's	France	"Liberta"	2009	2
Katy Perry	United States	"Feels"	2017	2
Peter and Sloane	France	"Besoin de rien, envie de toi"	1984	9
Pietri, Julie	France	"Ève lève-toi"	1986	1
Pigloo	France	"Le Papa Pingouin"	2006	3
Pitbull	United States	"I Know You Want Me (Calle Ocho)"	2009	8
Pitbull	United States	"On the Floor"	2011	1
Plage, La	France	"Coup de Boule"	2006	3
PLK	France	"Un peu de haine"	2019	1
PLK	France	"Petrouchka"	2022	1
PLK	France	"Demain"	2023	2
PLK	France	"Pocahontas"	2026	3
PNL	France	"À l'ammoniaque"	2018	3
PNL	France	"91's"	2018	3
PNL	France	"Au DD"	2019	7
M. Pokora	France	"Dangerous"	2008	1
Pomme	France	"Ma meilleure ennemie"	2024	1
Pow woW	France	"Le Chat"	1992	7
Prince	United States	"Purple Rain"	2016	1
Product G&B, The	United States	"Maria Maria"^{1}	2000	4
Pronto & Eunique	Germany	"Love Nwantiti German Remix"	2021	1
Prydz, Eric	Sweden	"Call on Me"	2004	3
Psy	South Korea	"Gangnam Style"	2012	6
Charlie Puth	United States	"Marvin Gaye"	2015	1

== Q ==
Artist	Country	Number-one single(s)	Year	Weeks at #1
Íñigo Quintero	Spain	"Si No Estás"	2023	2

== R ==
Artist	Country	Number-one single(s)	Year	Weeks at #1
Reel 2 Real	United States	"I Like to Move It"	1994	5
Regg'Lyss	France	"Mets de l'huile"	1993	2
Renaud	France	"Toujours debout"	2016	1
René la Taupe	France	"Mignon, Mignon"	2010	13
Colonel Reyel	France	"Celui..."	2011	1
Colonel Reyel	France	"Toutes Les Nuits"	2011	1
Ricol, Christine	France	"4 Mots sur un piano"	2007	2
Rihanna	Barbados	"Don't Stop the Music"	2007	2
Rihanna	Barbados	"Man Down"	2011	5
Rihanna	Barbados	"We Found Love"	2011	5
Rihanna	Barbados	"Diamonds"	2012	3
Rihanna	Barbados	"The Monster"	2013	3
Rihanna	Barbados	"Work"	2016	2
Rikrok	United Kingdom	"It Wasn't Me"^{1}	2001	10
Rim'K	France	"Air Max"	2018	3
Rohff	France	"Qui est l'exemple ?"	2002	3
Mark Ronson	United Kingdom	"Uptown Funk"	2014	10
La Rvfleuze	France	"Sexy Nana"	2026	4
La Rvfleuze	France	"Fille À Papa"	2026	8

== S ==
Artist	Country	Number-one single(s)	Year	Weeks at #1
Sabrina	Italy	"Boys (Summertime Love)"	1987	5
Sandy	United Kingdom	"J'ai faim de toi"	1988	2
Santana	United States	"Maria Maria"	2000	4
Sardou, Michel	France	"La Rivière de notre enfance"	2004	5
Sargue, Damien	France	"Les Rois du monde"	2000	17
Scatman John	United States	"Scatman (Ski Ba Bop Ba Dop Bop)"	1995	1
Scatman John	United States	"Scatman's World"	1995	1
SCH	France	"Bande organisée"	2020	12
SCH	France	"9 1 1 3"	2020	1
SCH	France	"Mother Fuck"	2020	3
SCH	France	"Marché noir"	2021	1
SCH	France	"Mannschaft"	2021	1
SCH	France	"Lif"	2022	1
SCH	France	"Un Monde à L'Autre"	2025	2
Robin Schulz	Germany	"Prayer in C"	2014	15
Scorpions	Germany	"Wind of Change"	1991	7
SDM	France	"Bolide allemand"	2023	5
SDM	France	"Pour Elle"	2024	2
SDM	France	"Cartier Santos"	2024	5
Big Sean	United States	"Feels"	2017	2
Sebastian	United States	"Dangerous"^{1}	2008	1
Sébastien, Patrick	France	"Ah... si tu pouvais fermer ta gueule..."	2008	1
Ségara, Hélène	France	"Vivo per lei (je vis pour elle)"	1998	5
Ségara, Hélène	France	"Il y a trop de gens qui t'aiment"	2000	2
Shaggy	Jamaica	"It Wasn't Me"	2001	10
Shakira	Colombia	"Whenever, Wherever"	2002	4
Shakira	Colombia	"Hips Don't Lie"	2006	1
Shakira	Colombia	"Beautiful Liar"	2007	2
Shakira	Colombia	"Waka Waka (This Time for Africa)"	2010	6
Shakira	Colombia	"Je l'aime à mourir"	2011	7
Shakira	Colombia	"Dai Dai"	2026	9
Ed Sheeran	United Kingdom	"Shape of You"	2017	15
Ed Sheeran	United Kingdom	"Perfect"	2017	8
Sia	Australia	"Chandelier"	2014	3
Sia	Australia	"Cheap Thrills"	2016	2
Eva Simons	Netherlands	"Heartbeat"	2016	3
Matt Simons	United States	"Catch & Release"	2016	2
Smith, Will	United States	"Men in Black"	1997	3
Snap!	Germany	"Rhythm Is a Dancer"	1992	6
Snoop Dogg	United States	"Sweat"	2011	2
Snow, Mark	United States	"The X-Files"	1996	1
Sofiane	France	"Khapta"	2019	3
Souchon, Alain	France	"Foule sentimentale"	1993	1
Solda	France	"Bande organisée"	2020	12
Soolking	Algeria	"Suavemente"	2022	2
Soolking	Algeria	"Casanova"	2023	6
Spears, Britney	United States	"...Baby One More Time"	1999	2
Spears, Britney	United States	"Womanizer"	2008	5
Spears, Britney	United States	"Scream & Shout"	2013	1
Spice Girls	United Kingdom	"Wannabe"	1996	3
Springsteen, Bruce	United States	"Streets of Philadelphia"	1994	5
Moha La Squale	France	"Ma belle"	2019	4
Star Academy 1	France	"La Musique (Angelica)"	2001	9
Star Academy 1	France	"Gimme! Gimme! Gimme! (A Man After Midnight)"	2002	2
Star Academy 2	France	"Paris Latino"	2002	5
Star Academy 3	France	"L'Orange" / "Wot"	2003	4
Star Academy 4	France	"Laissez-moi danser"	2004	6
Star Academy 4	France	"Adieu monsieur le professeur"	2004	1
Star Academy 5	France	"Santiano"	2005	2
Starsailor	United Kingdom	"Four to the Floor"	2004	1
Stéphanie	Monaco	"Ouragan"	1986	10
Sting	United Kingdom	"Stolen Car"	2015	2
Stromae	Belgique	"Alors on danse"	2010	10
Stromae	Belgique	"Papaoutai"	2013	4
Stromae	Belgique	"Formidable"	2013	6
Stromae	Belgique	"Tous les mêmes"	2013	1
Stromae	Belgique	"L'enfer"	2022	2
Stromae	Belgique	"Ma meilleure ennemie"	2024	1
Stormzy	United Kingdom	"Plus jamais"	2020	1
Harry Styles	United Kingdom	"As It Was"	2022	1

== T ==
Artist	Country	Number-one single(s)	Year	Weeks at #1
T.I.	United States	"Blurred Lines"	2013	1
Tacabro	Italy	"Tacata'"	2012	1
Tayc	France	"Le Temps"	2021	1
Michel Teló	Brazil	"Ai Se Eu Te Pego"	2012	9
Ten Sharp	Netherlands	"You"	1992	2
Theodora	France	"Melodrama"	2025	28
Robin Thicke	United States	"Blurred Lines"	2013	6
Tiakola	France	"Meridan"	2023	2
Tiakola	France	"Notre Dame"	2023	1
Timal	France	"Filtré"	2022	2
Justin Timberlake	United States	"Can't Stop the Feeling!"	2016	7
Timbaland	United States	"Dangerous"^{1}	2008	1
Tones and I	Australia	"Dance Monkey"	2019	2
Tragédie	France	"Hey Oh"	2003	9
Tragédie	France	"Sexy pour moi"	2003	1
Tragédie	France	"Gentleman"	2004	1
Tribal King	France	"Façon Sex"	2006	5
Meghan Trainor	United States	"Marvin Gaye"	2015	1
Tyga	United States	"Loco Contigo"	2019	1
Tyler, Bonnie	United Kingdom	"Si demain... (Turn Around)"	2004	10

== U ==
Artist	Country	Number-one single(s)	Year	Weeks at #1
UB40	United Kingdom	"Kingston Town"	1990	3
USA for Africa	United States	"We Are the World"	1985	3
Usher	United States	"Yeah!"	2004	1

== V ==
Artist	Country	Number-one single(s)	Year	Weeks at #1
Vacra	France	"Fille À Papa"	2026	8
Vagabonds, Les	France	"Le temps des yéyés"	1990	7
Vald	France	"Désaccordé"	2018	7
Vald	France	"Peon"	2022	1
Vegedream	France	"Ramenez la coupe à la maison"	2018	5
Vianney	France	"La même"	2018	1
Vitaa	France	"Game Over"	2013	1
Voisine, Roch	Canada	"Hélène"	1989	9

== W ==
Artist	Country	Number-one single(s)	Year	Weeks at #1
Alan Walker	Norway	"Faded"	2016	4
Nick Waterhouse	United States	"Katchi"	2017	4
Wes	Cameroon	"Alane"	1997	10
Wanz	United States	"Thrift Shop"	2013	4
The Weeknd	Canada	"Starboy"	2016	1
The Weeknd	Canada	"I Feel It Coming"	2017	1
The Weeknd	Canada	"Blinding Lights"	2020	4
Werenoi	France	"Pyramide"	2024	1
Werenoi	France	"Triple V"	2025	1
Whatfor	France	"Plus haut"	2002	1
Willem, Christophe	France	"Double Je"	2007	7
Will.I.Am	United States	"Scream & Shout"	2013	1
Pharrell Williams	United States	"Blurred Lines"	2013	6
Pharrell Williams	United States	"Happy"	2013	22
Pharrell Williams	United States	"Feels"	2017	2
Willis, Chris	United States	"Gettin' Over You"	2010	1
Winston, Charlie	United Kingdom	"Like a Hobo"	2009	1
Winter, Ophélie	France	"Dieu m'a donné la foi"	1995	1
Wolf, Laurent	France	"No Stress"	2008	1
Wonder, Stevie	United States	"I Just Called to Say I Love You"	1984	1

== Y ==
Artist	Country	Number-one single(s)	Year	Weeks at #1
Yannick	France	"Ces soirées-là"	2000	15
Daddy Yankee	Puerto Rico	"Despacito"	2017	18
Yelle	France	"Parle à ma main"^{1}	2007	7

== Z ==
Artist	Country	Number-one single(s)	Year	Weeks at #1
Zadora, Pia	United States	"When the Rain Begins to Fall"	1984	3
Zebda	France	"Tomber la chemise"	1999	3
Zeg P	France	"Fade Up"	2022	3
Zouk Machine	Guadeloupe	"Maldòn (la musique dans la peau)"	1990	9
Zola	France	"9 1 1 3"	2020	1
Zola	France	"Amber"	2022	5
Zola	France	"Coeur De Ice"	2023	1
Zucchero	Italy	"Baila morena"	2006	4

^{1} Appears on the single cover as "featuring"
^{2} Credited as Vitoo

== See also ==
- List of number-one hits (France)
- Syndicat National de l'Édition Phonographique

== Sources ==
- Title Snep Chart Main Page
- Syndicat National de l'Édition Phonographique, official site (provides number-ones from June 2000)
- Habib, Elia (2002). Muz hit. tubes (in French). Alinea Bis. pp. 563–66. ISBN 2-9518832-0-X.
- Toutes les Chansons N° 1 des Années 50's, 60's, 70's, 80's 90's, 2000's, 2010's
