= List of number-one hits of 2020 (France) =

This is a list of the French SNEP Top 200 Singles and Top 200 Albums number-ones of 2020.

== Number ones by week ==
=== Singles chart ===
Week	Issue date	Download + Streaming		
Week	Issue date	Artist(s)	Title	Ref.
1	3 January	Gradur featuring Heuss l'Enfoiré	"Ne reviens pas"	
2	10 January	Gradur featuring Heuss l'Enfoiré	"Ne reviens pas"	
3	17 January	Gradur featuring Heuss l'Enfoiré	"Ne reviens pas"	
4	24 January	Gambi featuring Heuss l'Enfoiré	"Dans l'espace"	
5	31 January	Gambi featuring Heuss l'Enfoiré	"Dans l'espace"	
6	7 February	Gambi featuring Heuss l'Enfoiré	"Dans l'espace"	
7	14 February	Gradur featuring Heuss l'Enfoiré	"Ne reviens pas"	
8	21 February	The Weeknd	"Blinding Lights"	
9	28 February	Naps featuring Ninho	"6.3"	
10	6 March	Naps featuring Ninho	"6.3"	
11	13 March	Ninho	"Lettre à une femme"	
12	20 March	Ninho	"Lettre à une femme"	
13	27 March	Ninho	"Lettre à une femme"	
14	3 April	Ninho	"Lettre à une femme"	
15	10 April	Ninho	"Lettre à une femme"	
16	17 April	Ninho	"Lettre à une femme"	
17	24 April	The Weeknd	"Blinding Lights"	
18	1 May	The Weeknd	"Blinding Lights"	
19	8 May	The Weeknd	"Blinding Lights"	
20	15 May	Booba featuring Zed	"Jauné"	
21	22 May	Booba featuring Zed	"Jauné"	
22	29 May	Hatik	"Angela"	
23	5 June	Hatik	"Angela"	
24	12 June	Bosh	"Djomb"	
25	19 June	Bosh	"Djomb"	
26	26 June	Bosh	"Djomb"	
27	3 July	Bosh	"Djomb"	
28	10 July	Bosh	"Djomb"	
29	17 July	Dadju and Ninho	"Grand bain"	
30	24 July	Aya Nakamura	"Jolie nana"	
31	31 July	Aya Nakamura	"Jolie nana"	
32	7 August	Aya Nakamura	"Jolie nana"	
33	14 August	Aya Nakamura	"Jolie nana"	
34	21 August	Jul featuring SCH, Naps, Kofs, Elams, Solda, Houari and Soso Maness	"Bande organisée"	
35	28 August	Jul featuring SCH, Naps, Kofs, Elams, Solda, Houari and Soso Maness	"Bande organisée"	
36	4 September	Jul featuring SCH, Naps, Kofs, Elams, Solda, Houari and Soso Maness	"Bande organisée"	
37	11 September	Jul featuring SCH, Naps, Kofs, Elams, Solda, Houari and Soso Maness	"Bande organisée"	
38	18 September	Jul featuring SCH, Naps, Kofs, Elams, Solda, Houari and Soso Maness	"Bande organisée"	
39	25 September	Jul featuring SCH, Naps, Kofs, Elams, Solda, Houari and Soso Maness	"Bande organisée"	
40	2 October	Jul featuring SCH, Naps, Kofs, Elams, Solda, Houari and Soso Maness	"Bande organisée"	
41	9 October	Jul featuring SCH, Naps, Kofs, Elams, Solda, Houari and Soso Maness	"Bande organisée"	
42	16 October	Jul featuring SCH, Naps, Kofs, Elams, Solda, Houari and Soso Maness	"Bande organisée"	
43	23 October	Jul featuring SCH, Naps, Kofs, Elams, Solda, Houari and Soso Maness	"Bande organisée"	
44	30 October	Jul featuring SCH, Naps, Kofs, Elams, Solda, Houari and Soso Maness	"Bande organisée"	
45	6 November	Jul featuring SCH, Naps, Kofs, Elams, Solda, Houari and Soso Maness	"Bande organisée"	
46	13 November	Booba	"5G"	
47	20 November	Aya Nakamura featuring Stormzy	"Plus jamais"	
48	27 November	Zola featuring SCH	"9 1 1 3"	
49	4 December	Dinos featuring Nekfeu	"Moins un"	
50	11 December	Dua Lipa and Angèle	"Fever"	
51	18 December	Jul and SCH	"Mother Fuck"	
52	25 December	Jul and SCH	"Mother Fuck"	

=== Albums chart ===
Week	Issue date	Artist(s)	Album	Ref.
1	3 January	Vitaa and Slimane	Versus	
2	10 January	Vitaa and Slimane	Versus	
3	17 January	Vitaa and Slimane	Versus	
4	24 January	Maes	Les derniers salopards	
5	31 January	Maes	Les derniers salopards	
6	7 February	Mister V	MVP	
7	14 February	Vitaa and Slimane	Versus	
8	21 February	Vitaa and Slimane	Versus	
9	28 February	BTS	Map of the Soul: 7	
10	6 March	Vitaa and Slimane	Versus	
11	13 March	Les Enfoirés	Le Pari(s) des Enfoirés	
12	20 March	Ninho	M.I.L.S 3	
13	27 March	Ninho	M.I.L.S 3	
14	3 April	Ninho	M.I.L.S 3	
15	10 April	Da Uzi	Architecte	
16	17 April	Ninho	M.I.L.S 3	
17	24 April	Ninho	M.I.L.S 3	
18	1 May	Ninho	M.I.L.S 3	
19	8 May	Ninho	M.I.L.S 3	
20	15 May	Ninho	M.I.L.S 3	
21	22 May	Ninho	M.I.L.S 3	
22	29 May	Ninho	M.I.L.S 3	
23	5 June	Lady Gaga	Chromatica	
24	12 June	Hatik	Chaise pliante	
25	19 June	Johnny Hallyday	Happy Birthday Live	
26	26 June	Jul	La machine	
27	3 July	Benjamin Biolay	Grand Prix	
28	10 July	Jul	La machine	
29	17 July	Gambi	La vie est belle	
30	24 July	Jul	La machine	
31	31 July	Jul	La machine	
32	7 August	Jul	La machine	
33	14 August	Jul	La machine	
34	21 August	Vitaa and Slimane	Versus	
35	28 August	Eva	Feed	
36	4 September	Indochine	Singles Collection (2001–2021)	
37	11 September	Julien Doré	Aimée	
38	18 September	Grand Corps Malade	Mesdames	
39	25 September	Damso	QALF	
40	2 October	Damso	QALF	
41	9 October	Vitaa and Slimane	Versus	
42	16 October	13 Organisé	13 Organisé	
43	23 October	Francis Cabrel	À l'aube revenant	
44	30 October	Johnny Hallyday	Son rêve américain	
45	6 November	Vianney	N'attendons pas	
46	13 November	Ninho	M.I.L.S 3	
47	20 November	AC/DC	Power Up	
48	27 November	Zola	Survie	
49	4 December	AC/DC	Power Up	
50	11 December	Calogero	Centre ville	
51	18 December	Indochine	Singles Collection (1981–2001)	
52	25 December	Indochine	Singles Collection (1981–2001)	

== See also ==
- 2020 in music
- List of number-one singles in France
- List of top 10 singles in 2020 (France)
