= List of top 10 singles in 2020 (France) =

This is a list of singles that have peaked in the top 10 of the French Singles Chart in 2020. 100 singles were in the top 10 this year which 14 were on the number-one spot.

== Top 10 singles ==
Artist(s)	Single	Peak	Peak date	Ref.
Major Lazer featuring J Balvin and El Alfa	"Que Calor"	7	11 January	
Heuss l'Enfoiré featuring Jul	"Moulaga"	8	18 January	
Justin Bieber	"Yummy"	5	18 January	
Alicia Keys	"Underdog"	6	25 January	
Gambi featuring Heuss l'Enfoiré	"Dans l'Espace"	9	1 February	
Black Eyed Peas and J Balvin	"Ritmo (Bad Boys for Life)"	7	1 February	
BTS	"Black Swan"	3	1 February	
Billie Eilish and Khalid	"Lovely"	8	15 February	
Nea	"Some Say"	5	22 February	
Soolking and Dadju	"Meleğim"	4	22 February	
Clara Luciani	"Ma soeur"	8	29 February	
Clara Luciani	"Nue"	6	29 February	
Billie Eilish	"No Time to Die"	3	29 February	
BTS	"On"	2	7 March	
Lady Gaga	"Stupid Love"	1	14 March	
Les Enfoirés	"Mourir sur scène (live)"	6	21 March	
Les Enfoirés	"À côté de toi"	4	21 March	
Karol G and Nicki Minaj	"Tusa"	3	21 March	
Vitaa and Slimane	"Avant toi"	2	21 March	
V	"Sweet Night"	9	28 March	
Ninho	"Lettre à une femme"	5	28 March	
Manu Dibango	"Soul Makossa"	8	4 April	
Calogero	"On fait comme si"	1	4 April	
Kygo, Zara Larsson and Tyga	"Like It Is"	10	11 April	
Grover Washington Jr. and Bill Withers	"Just the Two of Us"	10	18 April	
Bill Withers	"Ain't No Sunshine"	3	18 April	
Florent Pagny, Pascal Obispo and Marc Lavoine	"Pour les Gens du Secours"	1	18 April	
Zazie	"Après la pluie"	7	25 April	
Grand Corps Malade	"Effets secondaires"	5	25 April	
Lara Fabian	"Nos coeurs à la fenêtre"	3	25 April	
Et demain ? Le collectif	"Et demain ?"	1	25 April	
Christophe	"Petite fille du Soleil"	9	2 May	
Christophe	"Succès fou"	8	2 May	
Christophe	"Les marionettes"	4	2 May	
Christophe	"Aline"	3	2 May	
Christophe	"Les paradis perdus"	2	2 May	
Christophe	"Les mots bleus"	1	2 May	
Young T & Bugsey featuring Headie One	"Don't Rush"	2	9 May	
The Rolling Stones	"Living in a Ghost Town"	1	9 May	
Doja Cat	"Say So"	2	16 May	
Idir	"A Vava Inouva"	1	16 May	
Booba and Zed	"Jauné"	6	23 May	
6ix9ine	"Gooba"	3	23 May	
Ariana Grande and Justin Bieber	"Stuck with U"	1	23 May	
M	"Croîs au Printemps"	8	30 May	
Surf Mesa featuring Emilee	"ILY (I Love You Baby)"	5	30 May	
The Weeknd	"In Your Eyes"	2	30 May	
Camélia Jordana	"Facile"	10	6 June	
T Garcia and DJ Assad	"Candela"	7	6 June	
Agust D	"Daechwita"	6	6 June	
Mory Kanté	"Yé ké yé ké"	4	6 June	
Lady Gaga and Ariana Grande	"Rain on Me"	1	6 June	
Topic and A7S	"Breaking Me"	7	13 June	
Saint Jhn	"Roses" (Imanbek remix)	4	13 June	
Indochine	"Nos célébrations"	1	13 June	
Sheila	"7ème Continent"	8	20 June	
Hatik	"Angela"	4	20 June	
Bosh	"Djomb"	4	27 June	
Kendji Girac	"Habibi"	2	27 June	
6ix9ine and Nicki Minaj	"Trollz"	1	27 June	
Black Eyed Peas featuring Ozuna and J. Rey Soul	"Mamacita"	2	4 July	
Grand Corps Malade and Camille Lellouche	"Mais je t'aime"	1	4 July	
Julien Doré	"La fièvre"	4	11 July	
Louane	"Donne-moi ton coeur"	8	18 July	
Ava Max	"Kings & Queens"	7	25 July	
Master KG featuring Nomcebo Zikode and Burna Boy	"Jerusalema"	1	25 July	
Keen'V	"Tahiti"	7	1 August	
Aya Nakamura	"Jolie nana"	2	1 August	
Jawsh 685 and Jason Derulo	"Savage Love (Laxed – Siren Beat)"	2	8 August	
Wes and Robin Schulz	"Alane"	5	15 August	
Miley Cyrus	"Midnight Sky"	5	29 August	
BTS	"Dynamite"	2	5 September	
Blackpink and Selena Gomez	"Ice Cream"	7	12 September	
Jul featuring SCH, Kofs, Naps, Soso Maness, Elams, Solda and Houari	"Bande organisée"	2	12 September	
Tayc	"N'y pense plus"	8	19 September	
Ofenbach and Quarterhead featuring Norma Jean Martine	"Head Shoulders Knees & Toes"	5	19 September	
David Guetta and Sia	"Let's Love"	4	26 September	
Mylène Farmer	"L'âme dans l'eau"	2	3 October	
Asaf Avidan featuring MC Solaar	"Lost Horse"	8	10 October	
Naza featuring Niska	"Joli bébé"	3	10 October	
Van Halen	"Jump"	7	17 October	
Purple Disco Machine and Sophie and the Giants	"Hypnotized"	6	17 October	
Akhenaton featuring Jul, L'Algérino, Alonzo, Shurik'n, Fahar, SCH and Le Rat Luciano	"Je suis Marseille"	9	24 October	
Patrick Fiori and Florent Pagny	"J'y vais"	4	24 October	
Fleetwood Mac	"Dreams"	3	24 October	
Zoe Wees	"Control"	2	24 October	
U2	"One"	2	31 October	
Ariana Grande	"Positions"	4	7 November	
Booba	"5G"	3	21 November	
Billie Eilish	"Therefore I Am"	7	28 November	
Vianney	"Beau-papa"	3	28 November	
Manu Chao	"La Vida Tombola"	10	5 December	
BTS	"Life Goes On"	3	5 December	
Richard Cocciante	"Il Mio Refugio"	10	12 December	
Indochine and Christine and the Queens	"3SEX"	3	12 December	
Gims	"Jusqu'ici tout va bien"	2	19 December	
Dua Lipa and Angèle	"Fever"	1	19 December	
Jul and SCH	"Mother Fuck"	9	26 December	
Kendji Girac and Gims	"Dernier métro"	8	26 December	
Grand Corps Malade	"Pas essentiel"	3	26 December	

== Entries by artists ==
The following table shows artists who achieved two or more top 10 entries in 2020. The figures include both main artists and featured artists and the peak position in brackets.

Entries	Artist	Singles
6	Christophe	"Les mots bleus" (1), "Les paradis perdus" (2), "Aline" (3), "Les marionettes" (4), "Succès fou" (8), "Petite fille du Soleil" (9)
4	BTS	"Black Swan" (3), "On" (2), "Dynamite" (2), "Life Goes On" (3)
4	Jul	"Moulaga" (8), "Bande organisée" (2), "Je suis Marseille" (9), "Mother Fuck" (9)
3	Ariana Grande	"Stuck with U" (1), "Rain on Me" (1), "Positions" (4)
3	Billie Eilish	"Lovely" (8), "No Time to Die" (3), "Therefore I Am" (7)
3	Grand Corps Malade	"Effets secondaires" (5), "Mais je t'aime" (1), "Pas essentiel" (3)
3	SCH	"Bande organisée" (2), "Je suis Marseille" (9), "Mother Fuck" (9)
2	Bill Withers	"Ain't No Sunshine" (3), "Just the Two of Us" (10)
2	Black Eyed Peas	"Ritmo (Bad Boys for Life) (7), "Mamacita" (2)
2	Booba	"Jauné" (6), "5G" (3)
2	Clara Luciani	"Ma soeur" (8), "Nue" (6)
2	Les Enfoirés	"Mourir sur scène (live)" (6), "À côté de toi" (4)
2	Florent Pagny	"Pour les gens du secours" (1), "J'y vais" (4)
2	Gims	"Jusqu'ici tout va bien" (2), "Dernier métro" (8)
2	Heuss l'Enfoiré	"Moulaga" (8), "Dans l'Espace" (9)
2	Indochine	"Nos célébrations" (1), "3Sex" (3)
2	J Balvin	"Que Calor" (7), "Ritmo (Bad Boys for Life)" (7)
2	Justin Bieber	"Yummy" (5), "Stuck with U" (1)
2	Kendji Girac	"Habibi" (2), "Dernier métro" (8)
2	Lady Gaga	"Stupid Love" (1), "Rain on Me" (1)
2	Nicki Minaj	"Tusa" (3), "Trollz" (1)
2	6ix9ine	"Gooba" (3), "Trollz" (1)

== See also ==
- 2020 in music
- List of number-one hits of 2020 (France)
