= Anarchie =

Anarchie may refer to:

- Interarchy, a FTP client, formerly named Anarchie
- Anarchie (album), a 2016 album by SCH

== See also ==
- Anarchy (disambiguation)
