= Tout va bien (disambiguation) =

Tout Va Bien may refer to:

- Tout Va Bien, a 1972 film directed by Jean-Luc Godard and Jean-Pierre Gorin
- "Tout Va Bien", a song by Pizzicato Five, appearing on their 1992 album Sweet Pizzicato Five
- "Tout va bien" (Alonzo song), a 2022 single by Alonzo featuring Ninho and Naps
