= Tout va bien (Alonzo song) =

Single by Alonzo featuring Ninho and Naps

from the album QUARTIERS NORD
- Language: French
- Released: 21 May 2022
- Genre: French hip hop
- Length: 3:13
- Songwriters: Alonzo; Ninho; Naps; SHK
- Producer: Spike Miller

Music video
- "Tout va bien" on YouTube

"Tout va bien" is a song by French artists Alonzo, Ninho and Naps released in May 2022. The song peaked at number one on the French Singles Chart. It was later included on Alonzo's ninth studio album, QUARTIERS NORD.

== Charts ==
Chart performance for "Tout va bien"
Chart (2022)	Peak position
Belgium (Ultratop 50 Wallonia)	3
France (SNEP)	1
Switzerland (Schweizer Hitparade)	4
