= 13 Organisé =

Studio album by Jul and various artists
- Released: 9 October 2020
- Recorded: 2020
- Genre: Hip hop; trap
- Length: 60:32
- Label: Rien 100 rien
- Producer: Jul

Jul chronology
La machine (2020)	13 Organisé (2020)	Loin du monde (2020)

13 Organisé chronology
13 Organisé (2020)	Le clasico organisé (2021)

Singles from 13 Organisé
- 1. "Bande organisée" Released: 15 August 2020

13 Organisé (French pronunciation: [ôrɡəˌnī.ze]) (stylized as 13'Organisé) is a French rap album, released on 9 October 2020 by the Rien 100 Rien label. The album is the result of a collaboration among approximately 50 French rappers, predominantly from Marseille.

== 13 Organisé collective ==
The project was launched by rapper Jul in mid-August 2020. He announced the project, naming the initial participants as SCH, Naps, Soprano, Alonzo, Soso Maness, Kofs, L'Algérino, as well as groups and collectives like IAM, Fonky Family, and Ghetto Phénomène. Additional artists were later added to the project, including Elams, Solda, Houari, Stone Black, Le Rat Luciano, Veazy, Many, Moubarak, Jhonson, As, Fahar, Friz, Vincenzo, Drime, Oussagaza, Don Choa, SAF, 2Bang, Youzi, Sysa, Thabiti, Zbig, AM La Scampia, Keny Arkana, Graya, 100 Blaze, Sauzer, Sat L'Artificier, Banguiz, Kamikaz, Moh, Dadinho, A-Deal, Zak, Diego, Tonyno, Kara, Daz, Bylk, Djiha, Akhenaton, and Shurik'n.

== Release ==
On 15 August 2020, Jul released the single "Bande organisée," featuring SCH, Kofs, Naps, Soso Maness, Elams, Houari, and Solda. The song was an immediate success, topping the French Singles Chart for several weeks. It achieved platinum certification, later upgraded to diamond, making it the fastest single in French music history to earn diamond status. The accompanying music video, released on the same day, accumulated over 148 million views on YouTube by the end of 2020.

The album 13 Organisé quickly gained commercial success, selling over 20,000 copies within three days of release and 36,000 copies in its first week. It was certified gold just two weeks after its release and debuted at number one on the French Albums Chart.

== Track list ==
13 Organisé track listing
No.	Title	Artist featuring	Length
1.	"Bande organisée"	Sch, Kofs, Jul, Naps, Soso Maness, Elams, Solda and Houari	5:56
2.	"L'étoile sur le maillot"	L'Algérino, Alonzo, Stone Black, Le Rat Luciano, Sch, Jul, As and Veazy	5:53
3.	"Combien"	Many, Jul, Solda, Moubarak, Soprano, Elams, Soso Maness, Veazy and Johnson	7:18
4.	"Partout c'est la même"	Saf, Jul, As, Elams, Fahar, Friz, Vincenzo and Drime	5:21
5.	"Ma gadji"	Kofs, Oussagaza, Don Choa, Saf, Soso Maness, 2Bang, Youzi and Jul	5:57
6.	"Tout a changé"	Le Rat Luciano, Soprano, Jul, L'Algérino, Sysa, Solda, Menzo, Stone Black and Fahar	7:23
7.	"War Zone"	Thabiti, Naps, Alonzo, Houari, Jul, As, Zbig and AM La Scampia	4:33
8.	"Heat"	Keny Arkana, Graya, 100 Blaze, Sauzer, Jul, Elams, Sat L'Artificier and Banguiz	4:57
9.	"Miami Vice"	Thabiti, Sysa, Drime, Jul, Kamikaz, Zbig and Moubarak	5:58
10.	"C'est maintenant"	Sat L'Artificier, Alonzo, Kofs, Naps, Sch, Jul, Kamikaz and L'Algérino	4:50
11.	"13 balles"	Kofs, Moh, 100 Blaze, Jul, Naps, Dadinho, A-Deal & Zak and Diego	4:27
12.	"La nuit"	Tonyno, Soso Maness, Kara, Jul, Daz, Bylk, Fahar, Kamikaz and Djiha	5:31
13.	"Je suis Marseille"	Akhenaton, Jul, L'Algérino, Alonzo, Shurik'n, Fahar, Sch and Le Rat Luciano	5:24

== Charts ==
=== Weekly charts ===
Chart (2020)	Peak position
Belgian Albums (Ultratop Flanders)	56
Belgian Albums (Ultratop Wallonia)	6
French Albums (SNEP)	1
Swiss Albums (Schweizer Hitparade)	14

=== Year-end charts ===
Chart (2020)	Position
Belgian Albums (Ultratop Wallonia)	83
French Albums (SNEP)	25

Chart (2021)	Position
Belgian Albums (Ultratop Wallonia)	170
French Albums (SNEP)	52

=== Top positions of tracks ===
Year	Title	Peak positions				Artists
Year	Title	FRA	BEL (Fl)	BEL (Wa)	SWI	Artists
2020	"Bande organisé"	1	Tip	2	7	Sch - Kofs - Jul - Naps - Soso Maness - Elams - Solda - Houari
2020	"L'étoile sur le maillot"	3	—	48	71	L'Algérino - Alonzo - Stone Black - Le Rat Luciano - Sch - Jul - As - Veazy
2020	"13 balles"	4	—	—	—	Kofs - Moh - 100 Blaze - Jul - Naps - Dadinho - A-Deal - Zak - Diego
2020	"Combien"	6	—	—	—	Many - Jul - Solda - Moubarak - Soprano - Elams - Soso Maness - Veazy - Jhonson
2020	"Ma gadji"	10	—	—	—	Kofs - Oussagaza - Don Choa - SAF - Soso Maness - 2Bang - Le Rat Luciano - Jul
2020	"Je suis Marseille"	12	—	—	—	Akhenaton - Jul - L'Algérino - Alonzo - Shurik'n - Fahar - Sch - Le Rat Luciano
2020	"War Zone"	14	—	—	—	Thabiti - Naps - Alonzo - Houari - Jul - As - Zbig - AM La Scampia
2020	"Tout a changé"	18	—	—	—	Le Rat Luciano - Soprano - Jul - L'Algérino - Sysa - Solda - Menzo - Stone Black - Fahar
2020	"Partout c'est le même"	20	—	—	—	SAF - Jul - As - Elams - Fahar - Friz - Vincenzo - Drime
2020	"C'est maintenant"	21	—	—	—	Sat l'Artificier - Alonzo - Kofs - Naps - Sch - Jul - Kamikaz - L'Algérino
2020	"Miami Vice"	25	—	—	—	Thabiti - Sysa - Drime - Jul - Kamikaz - Zbig - Moubarak
2020	"Heat"	30	—	—	—	Keny Arkana - Graya - 100 Blaze - Sauzer - Jul - Elams - Sat l'Artificier - Banguiz
2020	"La nuit"	36	—	—	—	Tonyno - Soso Maness - Kara - Jul - Jazzy Jazz - Bilk - Fahar - Kamikaz - Djiha

=== Certifications and sales ===
Region	Certification	Certified units/sales
France	Gold	50,000
