= Psy 4 de la Rime =

French hip hop band

- Also known as: KDB (Kid Dog Black) (original name)
- Origin: Marseille, France
- Genres: Rap, urban music
- Years active: 2001–2015
- Labels: 361 Records
- Past members: Segnor Alonzo; Don Vincenzo; Soprano; DJ Sya Styles

Psy 4 de la Rime (French pronunciation: [psi kat(ʁ) də la ʁim]) are a French hip hop band formed 1995 in Marseille comprising several rappers with immigrant backgrounds from former French colonies. Their original name was KDB, Kid Dog Black. The band was signed to 361 Records, a Marseille-based independent label founded by fellow rapper Akhenaton. The group had three albums, the debut Block Party (2002), Enfants de la lune (2005) and Les cités d'or (2008). After split, members particularly Soprano and Alonzo went on to have very successful solo careers with their own albums and single hits. The formation got together in 2013 to release a fourth album called 4eme Dimension that made to number 3 on the French Albums Chart.

== Formation and beginnings (1995–2001) ==
The group formed under the name of KDB (Kids Dog Black) in 1995, in Plan d'Aou in the northern districts of Marseille, in the Bouches-du-Rhône. The group begins with the scene, in particular in the first part of groups like the Sages Poètes de la Rue, the Fonky Family or the DJ Cut Killer. Thereafter, they will be brought to work with the Sad Hill Records label and get closer to DJ Kheops. From 1998, they madevarious titles on the soundtracks of films such as Zonzon by Laurent Bouhnikor Like a magnet with Akhenaton and Kamel Saleh at the helm, but also on the compilations Vague Nocturne, La Cosca, Time Bomb, Groove 100% Marseille hip hop, Sad Hill Impact, Turntable Dragun'z and Sur un air positive. Armed with these first experiences, the four rappers got down to their first album, Block Party, which was released in March 2002.

== Solo careers of members ==
Even before the split-up, some of the individual rappers in the band have continued their solo careers.

- Most notable of them was Soprano who had already released a solo album while in the band titled Puisqu'il faut vivre that had made it to #2 in the SNEP French Albums Chart. His album La Colombe released in 2010 has even topped the French Albums Chart, with the follow-up 2011 album Le Corbeau making to number 3 on the same chart. In 2012 he had a joint album with R.E.D.K. titled E=2MC's making it to number 6 and a solo album Cosmopolitanie reaching number 2 in 2014. Soprano has had ten singles reach the Top 20 of the French Singles charts, including "Cosmo", "Fresh Prince", and "Le Diable ne s'habille plus en Prada" cracking the Top 10.
- In similar fashion, Segnor Alonzo has continued to enjoy a good career under the shortened name Alonzo releasing three albums of his own starting with his 2009 solo album Un dernier coup d'œil dans le rétroviseur immediately after the split-up followed by the successful and critically acclaimed Les temps modernes in 2010, Amour, gloire & cité in 2012 making it to number 9 and the hugely successful Règlement de comptes reaching number 2 in the French Albums Chart.
- Sya Styles continued to collaborate in a number of productions including with IAM, Freeman and DJ Abdel. On 26 October 2015, DJ Sya Styles, the DJ of the formation died of cancer. He was 37. Soprano said it would be impossible to release a "Psy4 with 3 members" album, meaning an album without Sya Styles.

== Discography ==
=== Albums ===
Year	Albums	Charts				Certification
Year	Albums	FR	BEL Vl	BEL Wa	SWI	Certification
2002	Block Party	7	–	–	–	
2005	Enfants de la lune	3	–	50	78	
2008	Les cités d'or	1	–	10	21	
2013	4eme dimension	3	179	6	31	

Live albums

Year	Albums	Charts			Certification
Year	Albums	FR	BEL Wa	SWI	Certification
2002	Autour des cités d'or - Live au Dôme de Marseille	52	45	–	

=== Singles ===
Year	Singles	Charts	Certification	Album
Year	Singles	FR	Certification	Album
2002	"Le son des bandits" (feat. Saleem)	34		Block Party
2002	"Block Party"	91		Block Party
2003	"La vengeance aux deux visages"	40		Block Party
2003	"Sale bête (Live)"	70		From a live performance
2005	"Le monde est..."	44		Enfants de la lune
2006	"Enfants de la lune" (feat. Ana Torroja)	43		Enfants de la lune
2006	"Effet de style, effet de mode"	70		Enfants de la lune
2013	"Crise de nerfs"	48		4ème Dimension
2013	"Le retour des blocks"	175		4ème Dimension
2013	"Visage de la honte"	48		4ème Dimension
2013	"Le temps d'un instant"	63		4ème Dimension
2013	"Follow Me"	26		4ème Dimension
