= A7 (mixtape) =

Mixtape by SCH
- Released: 13 November 2015
- Recorded: 2015
- Genre: French hip-hop, Gangsta rap, Trap
- Label: Braabus Music, Def Jam France, Universal Records

SCH chronology
A7 (2015)	Anarchie (2016)

Singles from A7
- 1. "Gomorra"; 2. "Liquide"; 3. "A7"; 4. "Champs-Élysées"; 5. "Solides"; 6. "Fusil"

A7 is the debut mixtape of French rapper SCH, released on November 13, 2015 by Braabus Music, Def Jam and Universal.

The mixtape was called A7 after the motorway linking Lyon to Marseille. The mixtape is a reflection of SCH's upbringing in Marseille. It was a critical and commercial success, and helped to establish SCH as one of the most promising new rappers in France.

A7 was certified diamond in France, selling more than 500,000 copies.

== Track list ==
1. "John Lennon" (2:09)
2. "A7" (4:44)
3. "Solides" (4:07)
4. "Gedeon" (3:19)
5. "Rêves de gosse" (3:47)
6. "Genny & Ciiro" (1:20)
7. "Gomorra" (3:42)
8. "Mauvaises idées" (2:21)
9. "Liquide" (featuring Lacrim) (4:43)
10. "Pas de manières" (featuring Sadek & Lapso Laps) (3:52)
11. "Drogue prohibée" (3:22)
12. "Champs-Élysées" (3:45)
13. "J'reviens de loin" (4:18)
14. "Fusil" (4:12)

== Charts ==
=== Weekly charts ===
Chart (2015)	Peak position
Belgian Albums (Ultratop Wallonia)	12
French Albums (SNEP)	7
Swiss Albums (Schweizer Hitparade)	18

=== Year-end charts ===
Chart (2015)	Position
Belgian Albums (Ultratop Wallonia)	196
French Albums (SNEP)	104
Chart (2016)	Position
Belgian Albums (Ultratop Wallonia)	111
French Albums (SNEP)	30
