= Mother Fuck (song) =

2020 single by Jul

Single by Jul featuring SCH

from the album Loin du monde
- Released: 11 December 2020
- Length: 3:44
- Label: D'or et de platine
- Songwriters: Julien Maris; Julien Schwarzer
- Producer: Jul

Jul singles chronology
"Bande organisée" (2020)	"Mother Fuck" (2020)	"GJS" (2021)

SCH singles chronology
"American Airlines" (2020)	"Mother Fuck" (2020)	"9 1 1 3" (2020)

Music video
- "M*ther F**k" on YouTube

"Mother Fuck" (stylized as "M*ther F**k") is a song by French rapper Jul featuring vocals from French rapper SCH. It was released on 11 December 2020, as a single from Jul's album Loin du monde. It topped the French Singles Chart.

== Charts ==
Chart performance for "Mother Fuck"
Chart (2020)	Peak position
Belgium (Ultratop 50 Wallonia)	32
France (SNEP)	1
Switzerland (Schweizer Hitparade)	59
