= Cum-cum mania =

Single by Félicien
- B-side: "Remix + Instrumental"
- Released: 1 July 2002
- Recorded: France, 2002
- Genre: Pop
- Length: 3:23
- Label: M6
- Songwriter(s): Thierry Dauga

Félicien singles chronology
"Cum-cum mania" (2002)	"Tranquille Émile" (2003)

"Cum-cum mania" is the name of a 2002 song recorded by Félicien, a contestant of the French reality show Loft Story, broadcast during the spring of that year. Released as his debut single in June 2002, it surprisingly became a huge hit in France and Belgium.

== Background and writing ==
While he was still in the competition, Félicien decided on his own to leave the reality show. However, at his exit of the loft, he recorded a song, "Cum cum mania". Written by Thierry Dauga, arranged by Christian Ramis and published by M6, this popular song, that mixes good mood and sense of humour, is based on a traditional festival named Peña cum cum, celebrated every year in the Landes, South-West of France (Félicien lives in this region). The Peña cum cum of Amou and 'Les Faïences' bands also participated in the background vocals. As it was frequently sung by the contestants and the show was regularly seen by most of people in France, the song became successful, although there was no music video.

The song was part of the Belgian compilation Hitbox 2002, Vol. 4, Best of and the French compilations Hits 2002 and NonStop Hits 2002.

== Chart performance ==
In France, it started at #98 on the French Single Chart on 29 June 2002, although il was officially released a few days later. It climbed to #4, then topped the chart and stayed there for one week. After that, it didn't stop to drop on the chart, totaling six weeks in the top ten, 11 weeks in the top 50 and 17 weeks in the top 100. Thanks to this song, Félicien became the second contestant of Loft Story 2 to reach #1 in France (another entrant, Marlène Duval, also topped the chart two weeks before with "Un Enfant de toi", a duet with Phil Barney).

In Belgium (Wallonia), the single went to #12 on 20 July 2002, then jumped to the top five and eventually hit #2 in its fourth and fifth weeks, but its sales were less than Indochine's #1 hit "J'ai demandé à la lune". It dropped first slowly, then more quickly on the chart, remaining for seven weeks in the top ten and 12 weeks in the top 40.

Félicien was unable to duplicate this feat with his next two singles, "Tranquille Émile" and "Mi casa es su casa", which were failures, remaining at the bottom of the charts.

== Track listings ==
CD single

1. "Cum-cum mania" (radio edit) — 3:23
2. "Cum-cum mania" (tribal mix) by Shanon and R.One —5:08
3. "Cum-cum mania" (instrumental) — 3:23

7" maxi

1. "Cum-cum mania" (radio edit) — 3:23
2. "Cum-cum mania" (tribal mix) by Shanon and R.One —5:08
3. "Cum-cum mania" (instrumental) — 3:23

== Charts ==
Chart (2002)	Peak position
Belgian (Wallonia) Singles Chart	2
French SNEP Singles Chart	1

End of year chart (2002)	Position
Belgian (Wallonia) Singles Chart	31
French Singles Chart	52
