= Marché noir =

2021 single by SCH

Single by SCH

from the album Jvlivs II
- Released: 4 February 2021
- Length: 3:31
- Label: Rec. 118; Warner Music France
- Songwriter: Julien Schwarzer
- Producers: Katrina Squad; DJ Ritmin

SCH singles chronology
"9 1 1 3" (2020)	"Marché noir" (2021)	"Mannschaft" (2021)

Music video
- "Marché noir" on YouTube

"Marché noir" is a song by French rapper SCH. It was released on 4 February 2021, as a single off his fifth studio album Jvlivs II and peaked atop the French Singles Chart.

== Charts ==
=== Weekly charts ===
Weekly chart performance for "Marché noir"
Chart (2021)	Peak position
Belgium (Ultratop 50 Wallonia)	19
France (SNEP)	1
Switzerland (Schweizer Hitparade)	58

=== Year-end charts ===
Year-end chart performance for "Marché noir"
Chart (2021)	Position
France (SNEP)	57
