= Timal =

French rapper

- Born: Ruben Louis; 10 July 1997 (age 29); Saint-Denis, Seine-Saint-Denis, France
- Origin: Champs-sur-Marne, Seine-et-Marne, France
- Genres: French rap, trap
- Occupation: Rapper
- Years active: 2016-present
- Labels: Elektra, Warner Music

Ruben Louis (born 10 July 1997) better known by the stage name Timal is a French rapper born in Saint-Denis, Seine-Saint-Denis and grew up in Champs-sur-Marne, Seine-et-Marne. His Guadeloupean origin inspired him to take the name Timal. In 2016, he started posting freestyles on Daymolition's YouTube channel, which gives coverage to young rappers, and became popular with the freestyle series "Rapport". On 27 April 2018, he released his first studio album Trop chaud that was certified gold. He followed it up with album Caliente in 2020 with collaborations from Maes, Leto and PLK.

== Discography ==
=== Albums ===
Title	Year	Peak positions			
Title	Year	FRA	BEL (Fl)	BEL (Wa)	SWI
Trop Chaud	2018	2	—	9	54
Caliente	2020	2	98	4	13
Arès	2021	2	98	5	6
Darvaza	2024	9	—	32	63

=== Singles ===
==== As lead artist ====
Title	Year	Peak positions		Album
Title	Year	FRA	BEL (Wa)	Album
"Arrivant"	2018	28	15* (Ultratip)	Trop chaud
"Cavaler"	2020	20	36* (Ultratip)	Caliente
"Routine"	2020	40	37* (Ultratip)	Caliente
"Ailleurs" (featuring Maes)	2020	7	—	Caliente
"Bresom"	2021	131	—	non-album releases
"Fuego"	2021	20	—	non-album releases
"Filtré" (with Gazo)	2022	1	45	non-album releases
"R R Phantom"	2024	18	—	
"Sicario"	2026	2	—	

*Did not appear in the official Belgian Ultratop 50 charts, but rather in the bubbling under Ultratip charts.

==== As featured artist ====
Title	Year	Peak positions	Album
Title	Year	FRA	Album
"Dis-moi où tu pécho" (Sofiane featuring YL & Timal)	2016	—	#JesuispasséchezSo (Sofiane mixtape)
"#SixièmeOinj" (COR featuring Timal)	2018	—	—N/a
"Pas pareil" (YL featuring Timal)	2018	113	Nyx & Érèbe (YL album)
"Trafiquante" (Badjer featuring Timal)	2019	—	O.D (Badjer album)
"Toute l'année" (PLK featuring Timal)	2019	—	Mental (PLK album)
"Nuit" (Boumso featuring Timal)	2019	—	—N/a
"La vie de rêve" (Kaza featuring Timal)	2020	—	Heartbreak Life (Kaza album)

=== Other charted songs ===
Title	Year	Peak positions		Album
Title	Year	FRA	BEL (Wa)	Album
"Rapport n°5"	2017	120	—	Non-album song
"Vatos"	2017	49	Tip	Non-album song
"La 6"	2017	91	Tip	Non-album song
"La 7"	2018	151	—	Non-album song
"La 8 (Chivas)"	2018	54	Tip	Non-album song
"Dans la ville"	2018	56	—	Trop chaud
"Rien de nouveau"	2018	49	—	Trop chaud
"La 9 (Ruinart)"	2018	55	—	Trop chaud
"Cartel" (feat. Meryl)	2018	66	—	Trop chaud
"Maria"	2018	69	—	Trop chaud
"Du rire aux larmes"	2018	85	—	Trop chaud
"Timal"	2018	87	—	Trop chaud
"Lyca"	2018	89	—	Trop chaud
"Pirate"	2018	96	—	Trop chaud
"Je sais"	2018	104	—	Trop chaud
"La zone"	2018	124	—	Trop chaud
"Suarez"	2018	129	—	Trop chaud
"Trop chaud"	2018	158	—	Trop chaud
"Flics & stups"	2018	86	—	Non-album song
"La 10"	2018	25	Tip	Non-album song
"Overdose"	2019	159	—	Non-album song
"Story"	2019	101	—	Non-album song
"La 11"	2019	51	Tip	Non-album song
"La 12"	2019	105	36* (Ultratip)	Non-album song
"Week-end" (feat. Leto)	2020	16	Tip	Caliente
"Promis" (feat. PLK)	2020	17	—	Caliente
"La 13"	2020	26	—	Caliente
"Copilote"	2020	32	—	Caliente
"Disponible"	2020	34	—	Caliente
"Le temps passe"	2020	49	—	Caliente
"Caliente"	2020	50	—	Caliente
"Tu me connais"	2020	55	—	Caliente
"Sale"	2020	58	—	Caliente
"Souvenirs"	2020	59	—	Caliente
"Vida"	2020	61	—	Caliente
"Jour de paye"	2020	63	—	Caliente
"TBA"	2020	70	—	Caliente
"La maille"	2020	91	—	Caliente

*Did not appear in the official Belgian Ultratop 50 charts, but rather in the bubbling under Ultratip charts.
