= Toujours debout =

Single by Renaud
- Released: 26 January 2016
- Genre: Pop
- Length: 3:42
- Songwriters: Renaud Séchan; Michaël Ohayon
- Producer: Michaël Ohayon

"Toujours debout" is a song by Renaud released in 2016. It peaked at No 1 on the French Singles Chart on 29 January 2016.

== Charts ==
| Chart (2016) | Peak position |
|---|---|
| Belgium (Ultratop 50 Wallonia) | 2 |
| France (SNEP) | 1 |
| Switzerland (Schweizer Hitparade) | 48 |
