= Hé, biloute! Monte l'son! Hein! =

"Hé, biloute ! Monte l'son ! Hein !"

Single by Ch'ti DJ

from the album L'Album des Ch'tis
- B-side: "Remix"
- Released: 13 March 2008
- Recorded: France, 2008
- Genre: Pop, house, dance
- Length: 3:29
- Label: Nord-way Productions
- Songwriters: Krista Cappan, Fabrice Nyiri, Joël Guidon

"Hé, biloute ! Monte l'son ! Hein !" is a French 2008 song. It was the soundtrack of the 2008 motion picture comedy Bienvenue chez les Ch'tis and was recorded by Ch'ti DJ, a French DJ. It achieved success in France.

== Song information ==
It was written by Krista Cappan, Fabrice Nyiri and Joël Guidon and was released on March 13, 2008 in the Nord-Pas-de-Calais, then the whole of France in April, under Nord-Way Productions label.

It was a surprise hit in France, probably through the film success: it entered the SNEP singles chart at number nine on 5 April 2008, with 2,475 sales, then jumped directly to number one, selling 7,643 units this week, then dropped slowly, totaling nine weeks in the top ten, 23 weeks in the top 50 and 38 weeks on the chart. In Belgium (Wallonia), the song debuted on the chart on 24 May 2008, peaked at number seven in its fourth week and remained on the chart for 12 weeks.

Ch'ti DJ toured in France to promote his song, particularly devoted to the discothèques. The song is characterized by minimal lyrics with phrases taken from the film, and house and rap sonorities inspired by tecktonik. The song was generally well received by the media, although the commercial aspect of the single was deemed obvious. It was also stated by Ozap that the song was "a little opportunist".

== Track listings ==
CD single

1. "Hé, biloute ! Monte l'son ! Hein !" (Ch'ti edit radio) — 3:29
2. "Hé, biloute ! Monte l'son ! Hein !" (Ch'ti jump tonic mix) — 5:37
3. "Hé, biloute ! Monte l'son ! Hein !" (video)

Digital download

1. "Hé, biloute ! Monte l'son ! Hein !" (Ch'ti edit radio) — 3:36
2. "Hé, biloute ! Monte l'son ! Hein !" — 3:11
3. "Hé, biloute ! Monte l'son ! Hein !" (Ch'ti dub edit) — 3:16

== Charts and sales ==
=== Peak positions ===
Chart (2008)	Peak position
Belgian (Wallonia) Singles Chart	7
Eurochart Hot 100	8
French SNEP Singles Chart	1

=== Year-end charts ===
Chart (2008)	Position
Eurochart Hot 100	93
French Singles Chart	23
