= Anarchie (album) =

Studio album by SCH
- Released: 27 May 2016
- Recorded: 2015–2016
- Label: Braabus Music; Def Jam France; Universal

SCH chronology
A7 (2015)	Anarchie (2016)	Deo Favente (2017)

Singles from Anarchie
- 1. "Anarchie"; 2. "Je la connais" 3. "Dix-neuf"; 4. "Cartine Cartier"; 5. "Allô Maman"

Anarchie is the debut studio album by French rapper SCH, released on 27 May 2016 by Braabus Music, Def Jam and Universal.

== Track listing ==
1. "Anarchie" – 5:48
2. "Trop énorme" – 3:33
3. "Je la connais" – 3:39
4. "Cartine Cartier" (featuring Sfera Ebbasta) – 3:29
5. "Le doc" – 4:38
6. "Neuer" – 3:30
7. "Alleluia" – 3:59
8. "Allô Maman" – 3:24
9. "Quand on était mômes" – 5:22
10. "Dix-neuf" – 3:36
11. "Himalaya" – 4:38
12. "Essuie tes larmes" – 2:36
13. "Murcielago" – 3:33

== Charts ==
=== Weekly charts ===
Weekly chart performance for Anarchie
Chart (2016)	Peak position
Belgian Albums (Ultratop Flanders)	88
Belgian Albums (Ultratop Wallonia)	2
French Albums (SNEP)	2
Swiss Albums (Schweizer Hitparade)	8

=== Year-end charts ===
Year-end chart performance for Anarchie
Chart (2016)	Position
Belgian Albums (Ultratop Wallonia)	79
French Albums (SNEP)	36
Charts (2017)	Position
French Albums (SNEP)	161

== Certifications ==
Sales certifications for Anarchie
Region	Certification	Certified units/sales
France (SNEP)	2× Platinum	200,000^{‡}
^{‡} Sales+streaming figures based on certification alone.
