= Ne reviens pas =

- Remix version cover

Single by Gradur featuring Heuss l'Enfoiré

from the album Zone 59
- Language: French
- Released: 29 November 2019
- Genre: French rap
- Length: 3:08
- Label: Legévara
- Songwriters: Gradur; Zeg P; Heuss l'Enfoiré
- Producer: Gradur

Gradur singles chronology
"Rari" (2019)	"Ne reviens pas" (2019)

Music video
- "Ne reviens pas" on YouTube

"Ne reviens pas" is a song by French artists Gradur and Heuss l'Enfoiré. Released in November 2019, the song peaked at number-one on the French Singles Chart.

== Charts ==
=== Weekly charts ===
Chart (2019–2020)	Peak position
Belgium (Ultratop 50 Wallonia)	2
France (SNEP)	1
Germany (GfK)	99
Switzerland (Schweizer Hitparade)	21

=== Year-end charts ===
Chart (2020)	Position
Belgium (Ultratop Wallonia)	19
France (SNEP)	6
Switzerland (Schweizer Hitparade)	88
