= Jauné =

2019 song by Booba

Single by Booba
- Released: 2020
- Recorded: 2020
- Genre: French hip hop
- Length: 3:34
- Label: Universal
- Songwriters: Booba; Zed
- Producer: Booba

Booba singles chronology
"Cavaliero" (2020)	"Jauné" (2020)	"Dolce vita" (2020)

"Jauné" is a song by French artist Booba released in 2020. The song features vocals from Zed. The song reached number one on the French Singles Chart.

== Charts ==
Chart performance for "Jauné"
Chart (2020)	Peak position
Belgium (Ultratop 50 Wallonia)	25
France (SNEP)	1
Switzerland (Schweizer Hitparade)	26

== Certifications ==
Region	Certification	Certified units/sales
France (SNEP)	Diamond	333,333^{‡}
^{‡} Sales+streaming figures based on certification alone.
