= Bande organisée =

2020 song by Kofs, Soso Maness, Elams, Jul, SCH, Naps, Solda and Houari

Single by Kofs, Soso Maness, Elams, Jul, SCH, Naps, Solda and Houari

from the album 13 Organisé
- Language: French
- Released: 15 August 2020
- Length: 5:56
- Songwriters: Jul; SCH; Elams; Kofs; Houari; Naps; Soso Maness; Solda

Music video
- "Bande organisée" on YouTube

"Bande organisée" is a song by Marseille-based rappers Kofs, Soso Maness, Elams, Jul, SCH, Naps, Solda and Houari. It was released on 15 August 2020, as the lead single off the collective studio album 13 Organisé. The song spent twelve consecutive weeks atop the French Singles Chart and was certified Diamond in France within five weeks.

== Charts ==
=== Weekly charts ===
Chart performance for "Bande organisée"
Chart (2020)	Peak position
Belgium (Ultratip Bubbling Under Flanders)	9
Belgium (Ultratop 50 Wallonia)	2
France (SNEP)	1
Global 200 (Billboard)	115
Switzerland (Schweizer Hitparade)	7

=== Year-end charts ===
2020 year-end chart performance for "Bande organisée"
Chart (2020)	Position
Belgium (Ultratop Wallonia)	30
France (SNEP)	1
Switzerland (Schweizer Hitparade)	61

2021 year-end chart performance for "Bande organisée"
Chart (2021)	Position
France (SNEP)	4

== Certifications ==
Certifications for "Bande organisée"
Region	Certification	Certified units/sales
Belgium (BRMA)	Platinum	40,000^{‡}
France (SNEP)	Diamond	333,333^{‡}
^{‡} Sales+streaming figures based on certification alone.
