= Grand bain =

Single by Dadju featuring Ninho

from the album Toxic ou Antidote
- Released: 19 June 2020
- Recorded: 2019
- Length: 3:27
- Label: Amaterasu; Polydor
- Songwriters: Djuna Nsungula; William Nzabolazo
- Producer: MKL

Dadju featuring Ninho singles chronology
| "Bobo au coeur" (2020) | "Grand bain" (2020) | "Amour toxic" (2020) |

Music video
- "Grand bain" on YouTube

"Grand bain" is a song by French singer Dadju featuring French rapper Ninho. It was released on 19 June 2020.

== Charts ==
=== Weekly charts ===
Weekly chart performance for "Grand bain"
| Chart (2020) | Peak position |
|---|---|
| Belgium (Ultratop 50 Wallonia) | 14 |
| France (SNEP) | 1 |
| Switzerland (Schweizer Hitparade) | 53 |

=== Year-end charts ===
2020 year-end chart performance for "Grand bain"
| Chart (2020) | Position |
|---|---|
| Belgium (Ultratop Wallonia) | 83 |
| France (SNEP) | 11 |

2021 year-end chart performance for "Grand bain"
| Chart (2021) | Position |
|---|---|
| France (SNEP) | 117 |

== Certifications ==
Certifications for "Grand bain"
| Region | Certification | Certified units/sales |
|---|---|---|
| France (SNEP) | Diamond | 333,333^{‡} |
^{‡} Sales+streaming figures based on certification alone.
