= Soso Maness =

French rapper (born 1987)

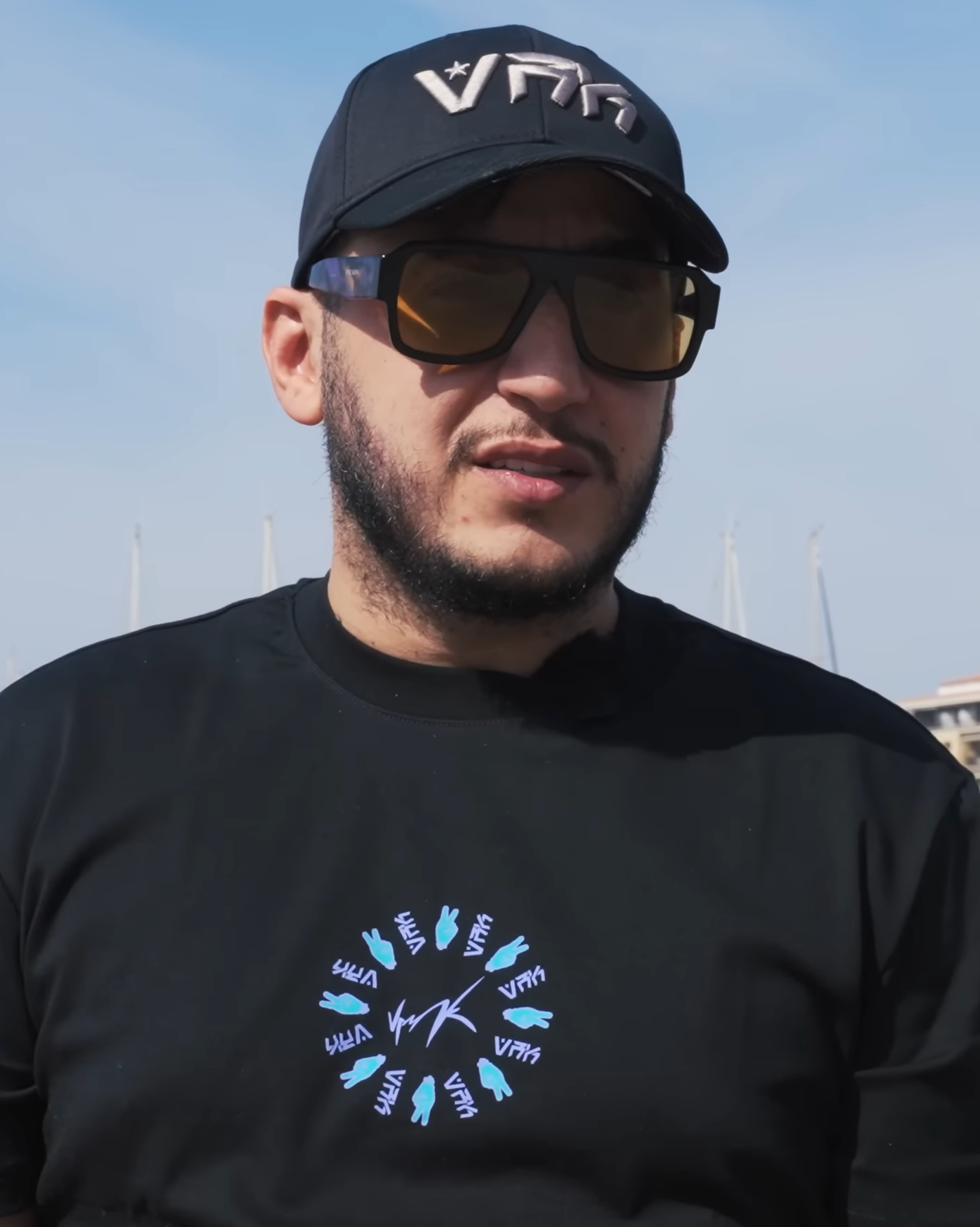
- Soso Maness in 2024
- Born: Sofien Hakim Manessour; 21 March 1987 (age 38); Marseille, France
- Occupation: Rapper
- Years active: 2014–present
- Musical career
- Genres: Hip hop
- Labels: Sony Entertainment France

Sofien Hakim Manessour (born 21 March 1987 in Marseille), known professionally as Soso Maness (French pronunciation: [soso manɛs]), is a French rapper and actor. He has released three albums, Rescapé in 2019, Mistral in 2020 and Avec le temps in 2021. Mistral reached number 2 on the French Albums Chart. His song "Petrouchka" featuring rapper PLK reached number 1 on the French Singles Chart.

Born in France, Soso Maness is of Algerian descent.

== Discography ==
=== Albums ===
Title	Year	Peak positions			Certifications
Title	Year	FRA	BEL (Wa)	SWI	Certifications
Rescapé	2019	49	—	—	
Mistral	2020	2	14	47	
Avec le temps	2020	1	5	12	
À L'aube	2022	—	38	73	

=== Singles ===
Title	Year	Peak positions			Album
Title	Year	FRA	BEL (Wa)	SWI	Album
"Zumba cafew"	2021	90	—	—	Avec le temps
"Petrouchka" (featuring PLK)	2021	1	1	19	Avec le temps

=== Other charting songs ===
Title	Year	Peak positions		Album
Title	Year	FRA	BEL (Wa)	Album
"So Maness"	2020	19	—	Mistral
"Zodiaque" (feat. Da Uzi)	2020	50	—	Mistral
"Dans mes rêves"	2020	55	—	Mistral
"Qu'est-ce qu'ils connaissent?" (feat. Lacrim)	2020	65	—	Mistral
"Mistral"	2020	75	—	Mistral
"Boussole" (feat. Alonzo)	2020	78	—	Mistral
"Pinpon"	2020	80	—	Mistral
"Balance"	2020	102	—	Mistral
"Le sang appelle le sang"	2020	122	—	Mistral
"Fucked Up"	2020	125	—	Mistral
"Interlude"	2020	126	—	Mistral
"Ecouté par les vrais"	2020	183	—	Mistral
"Sadio Maness"	2020	196	—	Mistral
"DDD" (feat. Hornet La Frappe)	2020	198	—	Mistral
"Lewandowski" (with Kore feat. Nahir)	2021	145	—	En Passant Pécho (soundtrack)
"Les derniers marioles" (feat. SCH)	2021	15	—	Avec le temps
"Puta Madre" (feat. Jul)	2021	13	—	Avec le temps
"Dlb13"	2021	35	—	Avec le temps
"Toute la noche" (feat. Gims)	2021	41	—	Avec le temps
"3x filtre"	2021	67	—	Avec le temps
"Fils de voyou"	2021	74	—	Avec le temps
"Clair-obscur"	2021	82	—	Avec le temps
"Sur la tête de mon ex"	2021	84	—	Avec le temps
"Reveiller"	2021	89	—	Avec le temps
"J'amerais tellement te dire"	2021	94	—	Avec le temps
"Interlude (ô Baumettes)"	2021	100	—	Avec le temps
"Outro"	2021	120	—	Avec le temps
"Avec le temps"	2021	121	—	Avec le temps
"Het gaat goed"	2021	127	—	Avec le temps
"Madame Maness"	2021	133	—	Avec le temps

=== Featured in ===
Title	Year	Peak positions			Album
Title	Year	FRA	BEL (Wa)	SWI	Album
"Allez nique ta mère" (Lacrim feat. Soso Maness)	2020	15	—	—	Lacrim album R.I.P.R.O. 4
"Bande organisée" (SCH - Kofs - Jul - Naps - Soso Maness - Elams - Solda - Houari)	2020	1	2	7	13 Organisé album 13 Organisé
"Combien" (Many - Jul - Solda - Moubarak - Soprano - Elams - Soso Maness - Veazy - Jhonson)	2020	6	—	—	13 Organisé album 13 Organisé
"Ma gadji" (Kofs - Oussagaza - Don Choa - SAF - Soso Maness - 2Bang - Le Rat Luciano - Jul)	2020	10	—	—	13 Organisé album 13 Organisé
"La nuit" (Tonyno - Soso Maness - Kara - Jul - Jazzy Jazz - Bilk - Fahar - Kamikaz - Djiha)	2020	36	—	—	13 Organisé album 13 Organisé
"Nineta " (Alonzo feat. Soso Maness)	2021	173	—	—	Alonzo album Capo dei capi - Vol. II & III
"Du nord au sud" (Da Uzi feat. Soso Maness & ZKR)	2021	64	—	—	Da Uzi album Vrai 2 vrai
