= Alonzo (rapper) =

French rapper and singer

- Alonzo in 2025.

Background information
- Also known as: Alonz', ALZ, Segnor Alonzo, El Capo, Papé, Guinomo
- Born: Kassim Djae; 25 July 1982 (age 44); Marseille, Provence-Alps-French Riviera, France
- Origin: Marseille
- Genres: Hip hop, gangsta rap
- Occupations: Rapper, singer, songwriter
- Years active: 2002–present
- Labels: Def Jam, Universal Music
- Formerly of: Psy 4 de la Rime

Kassim Djae (born 25 July 1982), better known by his stage name Alonzo, is a French rapper and singer. He was signed to Def Jam Recordings France.

== Career ==
He started rapping from 2002 onwards and was part of the Marseille-based hip hop band Psy 4 de la Rime as Segnor Alonzo alongside band members Don Vincenzo (real name Illiassa Issilame), Soprano (real name Saïd M'Roubaba) and DJ Sya Styles (real name Rachid Aït Baar).

In 2010, he released a solo album Les temps modernes. His 2012 album Amour, gloire & cité (aka AG&C) contains collaborations with a number of artists such as Kenza Farah, Soprano and L'Algérino. His two next albums Règlement de comptes and Avenue de Saint-Antoine are certified gold and double platinum.

== Childhood and family ==
Kassim Djae was born on 25 July 1982 in Marseille, in the Bouches-du-Rhône. He grew up in Plan d'Aou in the 15th arrondissement of Marseille and was the youngest of seven children of Comorian origin, of Muslim faith. His mother was a housewife and his father a sailor.

== Discography ==
=== Albums ===
As part of Psy 4 de la Rime

- 2002: Block Party
- 2005: Enfants de la lune
- 2008: Les cités d'or
- 2013: 4eme dimension

Solo

Year	Albums	Charts			Certifications
Year	Albums	FRA	BEL (Wa)	SWI	Certifications
2009	Un dernier coup d'œil dans le rétroviseur	46	—	—	
2010	Les temps modernes	7	46	—	
2012	Amour, gloire & cité	9	71	—	
2014	La belle vie - EP	—	—	—	
2015	Règlement de comptes	2	12	45	
2015	Capo del capi - Volume 1	4	11	—	
2016	Avenue de St Antoine	3	9	34	SNEP: 2xPlatinum
2017	100%	3	5	50	SNEP: Platinum
2019	Stone	9	23	63	SNEP: Gold
2021	Capo dei capi - Vol. II & III	3	34	71	SNEP: Gold
2022	Quartiers nord	3	21	34	

=== EPs ===
Year	Albums	Charts	
Year	Albums	FRA	BEL (Wa)
2009	Pack de 6 (EP)	62	168

=== Singles ===
Year	Single	Charts		Certifications	Album
Year	Single	FRA	BEL (Wa)	Certifications	Album
2012	"Avoir une fille"	—	—		Amour, gloire & cité
2012	"Alors on sort..."	196	—		Amour, gloire & cité
2014	"La belle vie"	24	—		Règlement de comptes
2014	"Y'a rien à faire"	12	32 (Ultratip)		Règlement de comptes
2014	"Même tarif" (featuring Booba)	8	39		Règlement de comptes
2015	"Normal" (with Jul)	7	34 (Ultratip)		Capo del capi - Volume 1
2015	"Finis les"	23	—		Capo del capi - Volume 1
2016	"On met les voiles"	62	—	SNEP: Gold	Pattaya soundtrack
2016	"Vaillant"	45	—	SNEP: Gold	Avenue de St Antoine
2016	"Regarde-moi"	66	—	SNEP: Gold	Avenue de St Antoine
2017	"Batard"	66	—		Non-album singles
2017	"DLG"	65	—		Non-album singles
2017	"Feu d'artifice" (with MHD)	19	25 (Ultratip)	SNEP: Platinum	100%
2017	"J'écris"	42	—		100%
2017	"Bagarre"	44	—	SNEP: Gold	100%
2017	"Suis-moi"	24	26 (Ultratip)	SNEP: Platinum	100%
2017	"Papa allo"	38	40	SNEP: Platinum	100%
2018	"Santana"	56	—	SNEP: Platinum	Taxi 5
2019	"Assurance vie"	29	—	SNEP: Gold	Stone
2021	"Criminel"	87	—		Non-album single
2022	"Tout va bien" (with Ninho and Naps)	1	3		Quartiers nord
2024	"Hasta La Vista"	38	—		Non-album single

*Did not appear in the official Belgian Ultratop 50 charts, but rather in the bubbling under Ultratip charts.

=== Other songs ===
Year	Single	Charts	Certifications	Album
Year	Single	FRA	Certifications	Album
2014	"Dans son sac" (featuring Maître Gims)	78		Règlement de comptes
2015	"Tu vas parler"	66		Règlement de comptes
2015	"Brinks" (featuring Gradur)	90		Règlement de comptes
2015	"Merci" (featuring Lacrim)	111		Règlement de comptes
2015	"RDC"	164		Règlement de comptes
2015	"Marseille"	167		Règlement de comptes
2015	"En boucle"	190		Règlement de comptes
2015	"Il le fallait"	195		Règlement de comptes
2015	"Y'en a assez"	42		Capo del capi - Volume 1
2015	"Cauchemar" (featuring Benash)	131		Capo del capi - Volume 1
2015	"On craint degun" (featuring Le Rat Luciano)	145		Capo del capi - Volume 1
2015	"Elle t'a tué"	163		Capo del capi - Volume 1
2015	"Mauvais"	195		Capo del capi - Volume 1
2016	"Ils le savent" (featuring Jul)	35		Avenue de Saint Antoine
2016	"Binta"	25	SNEP: Diamond	Avenue de Saint Antoine
2016	"Jupiter"	96		Avenue de Saint Antoine
2016	"Madame Alonzo" (featuring Leslie)	101		Avenue de Saint Antoine
2016	"Reste tranquille"	109		Avenue de Saint Antoine
2016	"ALZ"	113		Avenue de Saint Antoine
2016	"Comme avant"	158		Avenue de Saint Antoine
2016	"La guerre"	179		Avenue de Saint Antoine
2017	"Génération X-Or"	48		100%
2017	"La vaillance"	33		100%
2017	"La vraie vie"	85		100%
2017	"Dalé" (featuring Lartiste)	69		100%
2017	"La paix n'a pas de prix" (featuring Dadju)	53		100%
2017	"Ma famille"	92		100%
2017	"Elvira"	67	SNEP: Gold	100%
2017	"Jalousie"	89		100%
2017	"100%" (feat. Amel Bent)	102		100%
2019	"Malaga"	130		Stone
2019	"C'est elle" (with Ninho)	42	SNEP: Gold	Stone
2019	"M.D.V" (feat. Dadju)	120		Stone
2019	"Sur la moto" (feat. Jul)	123		Stone
2019	"Compliqué"	159		Stone
2019	"Stone III"	176		Stone
2019	"Training Day"	179		Stone
2019	"Stone II"	190		Stone
2020	"OOP"	106		
2020	"Dernière fois" (feat. Imen Es)	41		SNEP: Platinum
2021	"Capo"	31		Capo dei capi - Vol. II & III
2021	"La seleçao" (feat. Jul & Naps)	2		Capo dei capi - Vol. II & III
2021	"Goyard" (feat. SCH)	83		Capo dei capi - Vol. II & III
2021	"Marié à la street" (feat. Bosh & Da Uzi)	106		Capo dei capi - Vol. II & III
2021	"Ami ou ennemi" (feat. Tiakola)	111		Capo dei capi - Vol. II & III
2021	"280" (feat. ZKR)	112		Capo dei capi - Vol. II & III
2021	"Dinero" (feat. Soolking & L'Algérino)	118		Capo dei capi - Vol. II & III
2021	"Mayday" (feat. Franglish)	139		Capo dei capi - Vol. II & III
2021	"Arrivederci"	145		Capo dei capi - Vol. II & III
2021	"Vérifié"	151		Capo dei capi - Vol. II & III
2021	"Comme un loup" (feat. Kofs)	186		Capo dei capi - Vol. II & III
2021	"Je tourne"	187		Capo dei capi - Vol. II & III
2021	"Fournisseur"	188		Capo dei capi - Vol. II & III
2021	"Dangereuse"	193		Capo dei capi - Vol. II & III
2021	"Filature"	196		Capo dei capi - Vol. II & III
2021	"V.D.S. V.D.V."	199		Capo dei capi - Vol. II & III
2022	"Traficante"	10		Quartiers nord
2022	"Plaqué 13"	45		Quartiers nord
2022	"Bali"	55		Quartiers nord

=== As featured artist ===
Year	Single	Charts	Certifications	Album
Year	Single	FRA	Certifications	Album
2015	"J'donne ça" (Gradur featuring Alonzo)	134		Gradur album L'homme au bob
2015	"Comme d'hab" (Jul featuring Alonzo)	37		Jul album My World
2016	"Oh My God" (DJ Spike Miller featuring Alonzo)	21		DJ Spike Miller album Avenue de St. Antoine
2016	"La frappe" (Elam featuring Alonzo)	114		
2016	"Rihanna" (Soprano featuring Alonzo)	86		Soprano album L'Everest
2016	"Savastano" (L'Algérino featuring Alonzo)	102		L'Algérino album Banderas
2016	"Tout ce qu'il faut" (Black M featuring Abou Debeing, Alonzo & Gradur)	146		
2016	"Oblah" (Gradur feat. MHD, Alonzo & Nyda)	19	SNEP: Platinum	Gradur album Where Is l'album de Gradur
2017	"Ce soir" (Ninho featuring Alonzo)	12: SNEP: Gold		Ninho album Comme prévu
2017	"Ma fierté" (Dadju featuring Maître Gims & Alonzo)	28	SNEP: Gold	Dadju album Gentleman 2.0
2018	"Donne-nous le" (YL featuring Alonzo)	102		YL album Confidences
2018	"Ça va" (Naza featuring Alonzo)	92		
2018	"Les 4 fantastiques" (L'Algérino featuring Soprano, Naps & Alonzo)	101		L'Algérino album International
2018	"Quelqu'un d'autre t'aimera" (Jul featuring Alonzo)	32		Jul album Inspi d'ailleurs
2018	"Amigo" (Rim'K featuring Alonzo)	181		
2018	"Oh fou" (Jul featuring Alonzo)	50		Jul album La zone en personne
2019	"Comme tu es" (Jok'Air featuring Alonzo)	94		Jok'air album Jok'Travolta
2019	"10/10" (Maître Gims featuring Dadju & Alonzo)	94	SNEP: Gold	Maître Gims album Ceinture noire (Transcendance - Ré-édition)
2020	"F.L.P" (Da Uzi featuring Alonzo)	85		Da Uzi album Architecte
2020	"Maman dort" (S.Pri Noir & Alonzo)	62	SNEP: Gold	S.Pri Noir album État d'esprit
2020	"Boussole" (Soso Maness featuring Alonzo)	78		Soso Maness album Mistral
2020	"Toi t'es chelou" (Landy featuring Alonzo)	82		
2020	"L'étoile sur le maillot" (L'Algérino - Alonzo - Stone Black - Le Rat Luciano - SCH - Jul - As - Veazy)	3		13 Organisé album 13 Organisé
2020	"Je suis Marseille" (Akhenaton - Jul - L'Algérino - Alonzo - Shurik'n - Fahar - SCH - Le Rat Luciano)	12		13 Organisé album 13 Organisé
2020	"War Zone" (Thabiti - Naps - Alonzo - Houari - Jul - As - Zbig - AM La Scampia)	14		13 Organisé album 13 Organisé
2020	"C'est maintenant" (Sat l'Artificier - Alonzo - Kofs - Naps - Sch - Jul - Kamikaz - L'Algérino)	21		13 Organisé album 13 Organisé
2020	"Hold-Up" (Jul feat. Alonzo & L'Algérino)	26		Jul album Loin du monde
2023	"Petit Génie" (Jungeli feat. Imen Es and Alonzo)	1		
