= Lettre à une femme =

Single by Ninho

from the album M.I.L.S 3
- Language: French
- Released: 7 March 2020
- Length: 2:37
- Songwriters: Heezy Lee; Ninho; Crxsade

Music video
- "Lettre à une femme" on YouTube

"Lettre à une femme" is a song by Ninho released in 2020. It has peaked at number-one on the French Singles Chart where he stayed for six weeks.

== Charts ==
=== Weekly charts ===
Weekly Chart performance for "Lettre à une femme"
Chart (2020)	Peak position
Belgium (Ultratop 50 Wallonia)	1
France (SNEP)	1
Switzerland (Schweizer Hitparade)	4

=== Year-end charts ===
2020 year-end chart performance for "Lettre à une femme"
Chart (2020)	Position
Belgium (Ultratop Wallonia)	52
France (SNEP)	5

2021 year-end chart performance for "Lettre à une femme"
Chart (2021)	Position
France (SNEP)	106

== Certifications ==
Region	Certification	Certified units/sales
Belgium (BRMA)	Platinum	40,000^{‡}
Canada (Music Canada)	Gold	40,000^{‡}
France (SNEP)	Diamond	333,333^{‡}
^{‡} Sales+streaming figures based on certification alone.
