= SCH (rapper) =

French rapper (born 1993)

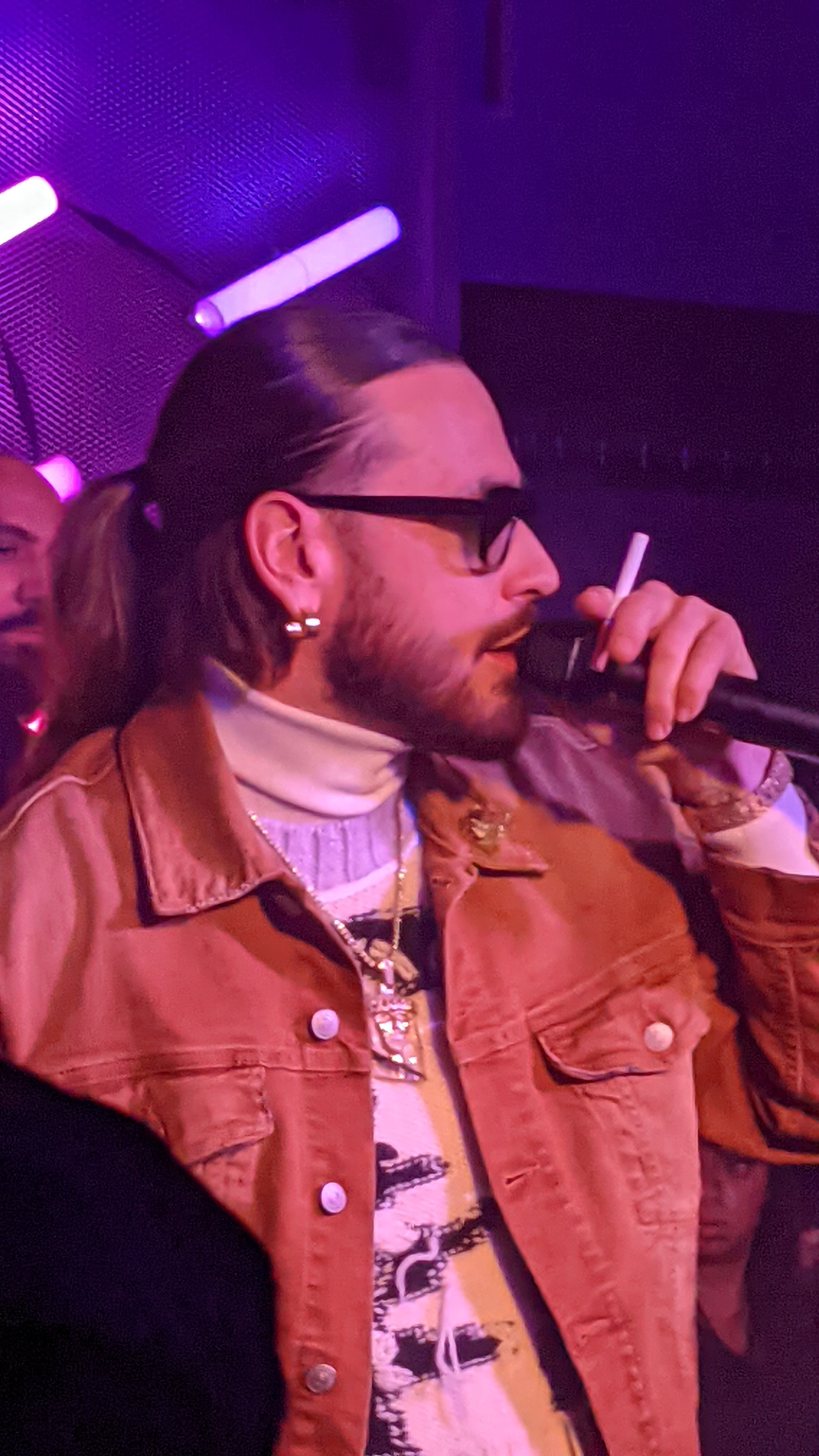

Background information
- Born: Julien Schwarzer; 6 April 1993 (age 33); Marseille, France
- Genre: Hip hop
- Occupation: Rapper
- Years active: 2008–present
- Labels: Maison Baron Rouge, Warner Music, Rec. 118

Julien Schwarzer (French pronunciation: [ʒyljɛ̃ ʃvaʁtsɛʁ], German: [ˈʃvaʁtsɐ]; born 6 April 1993), known professionally as SCH (French: [ɛ(s) se aʃ]), is a French rapper from Marseille.

== Early life ==
Julien Schwarzer was born in the Marseille suburb of Saint-Barnabé in the 12th arrondissement of the city to a nurse mother and a truck driver father. Julien moved with his family to Aubagne when he was 10. His paternal grandfather was a native of Berlin, Germany, who migrated to France and ultimately started a family there, hence his typically German-sounding surname.

== Career ==
He started writing songs at 13 and rapping by age 15. He posted his material on the Skyblog site using the pseudonym Schneider, and in 2014 chose his stage name SCH. He became known in 2015 by appearing on Lacrim's mixtape R.I.P.R.O. Volume 1.

He released his first mixtape, A7, on 13 November 2015, certified gold with over 68,000 copies sold. Eight of the 14 tracks were produced by Katrina Squad and the other six by DJ Kore. Many of the tracks were co-written with the Toulouse beatmakers Guilty and DJ Ritmin. He released his first studio album, Anarchie, on 27 May 2016. The album was produced by DJ Kore, with compositions by DJ Bellek, Tshek, Double X, Mr Punisher and Ozhora Miyagi.

== Discography ==
=== Studio albums ===
List of albums, with selected chart positions, sales and certifications
Title	Album details	Peak chart positions				Units	Certifications
Title	Album details	FRA	BEL (Fl)	BEL (Wa)	SWI	Units	Certifications
Anarchie	Released: 27 May 2016; Label: Braabus Music, Def Jam France, Universal Records; Format: CD, Digital download	2	88	2	8		SNEP: 3× Platinum
Deo Favente	Released: 5 May 2017; Label: Braabus Music, Millenium Capitol; Format: CD, digital download	1	—	2	8		SNEP: 2× Platinum
Jvlivs	Released: 19 October 2018; Label: Maison Baron Rouge, Warner Music France; Format: CD, digital download	2	72	7	11		SNEP: 3× Platinum
Rooftop	Released: 29 November 2019; Label: Maison Baron Rouge, Warner Music France; Format: CD, digital download	3	89	14	9	FRA: 45,502	SNEP: 2× Platinum
Jvlivs II	Released: 19 March 2021; Label: Maison Baron Rouge, Warner Music France; Format: CD, digital download	1	7	1	2		SNEP: Diamond
Jvlivs Prequel: Giulio	Released: 31 May 2024; Label: Warner Music France, Rec 118; Format: CD, digital download	1	118	1	2		SNEP: Platinum
Jvlivs III: Ad finem	Released: 6 December 2024; Label: Warner Music France, Rec 118; Format: CD, digital download	1	123	1	1		SNEP: Platinum

=== Mixtape ===
Year	Album	Peak position				Certification
Year	Album	FRA	BEL (Fl)	BEL (Wa)	SWI	Certification
2015	A7	2	—	12	18	SNEP: Diamond
2022	Autobahn	1	141	2	8	SNEP: Platinum

=== Singles ===
==== As lead artist ====
Year	Title	Peak positions			Certifications	Album
Year	Title	FRA	BEL (Wa)	SWI	Certifications	Album
2015	"A7"	77	—	—		A7
2015	"Champs-Élysées"	61	23* (Ultratip)	—		A7
2015	"Fusil"	44	8* (Ultratip)	—		A7
2016	"Anarchie"	24	7* (Ultratip)	—	SNEP: Platinum	Anarchie
2016	"Je la connais"	42	33* (Ultratip)	—	SNEP: Diamond	Anarchie
2016	"6.45i"	14	8* (Ultratip)	—	SNEP: Diamond	Deo Favente
2017	"Comme si"	5	5* (Ultratip)	—	SNEP: Diamond	Deo Favente
2018	"Mort de rire"	23	35* (Ultratip)	—	SNEP: Gold	Jvlivs
2018	"Otto"	3	41	79	SNEP: Diamond	Jvlivs
2019	"Haut Standing"	19	27* (Ultratip)	—	SNEP: Platinum	Non-album single
2019	"R.A.C."	5	6* (Ultratip)	—	SNEP: Platinum	Rooftop
2019	"Ça ira"	6	8* (Ultratip)	98	SNEP: Platinum	Rooftop
2019	"Mayday" (featuring Ninho)	9	31	54	SNEP: Diamond	Rooftop
2021	"Marché noir"	1	19	58	SNEP: Diamond	Jvlivs II
2021	"Mannschaft" (featuring Freeze Corleone)	1	4	19	SNEP: Platinum	Jvlivs II
2021	"GJS" (with Gims & Jul)	41	—	—		
2021	"Sapapaya" (with L'Algérino & Jul)	7	—	—		Non-album single
2022	"Lif"	1	35	43	SNEP: Platinum	Autobahn
2022	"Niobe"	7	34	—	SNEP: Gold	Autobahn
2022	"Magnum"	4	45	69	SNEP: Gold	Autobahn
2022	"Autobahn"	8	—	85	SNEP: Diamond	Autobahn
2023	"Dernière ligne droite"	—	50	—	SNEP: Gold	Non-album single
2024	"Cannelloni"	11	—	—	SNEP: Goldm	Jvlivs Prequel: Giulio
2024	"Prequel"	7	—	—	SNEP: Gold	Jvlivs Prequel: Giulio
2024	"Stigmates"	15	—	—	SNEP: Gold	Jvlivs III: Ad finem
2024	"2:00"	5	—	—	SNEP: Platinum	Jvlivs III: Ad finem

*Did not appear in the official Belgian Ultratop 50 charts, but rather in the bubbling under Ultratip charts.

==== As featured artist ====
Year	Title	Peak position					Certifications	Album
Year	Title	FRA	BEL (Wa)	SWI	GER	AUT	Certifications	Album
2015	"6.35" (Lacrim featuring SCH & Sadek)	134	—	—	—	—		R.I.P.R.O. Volume 1
2015	"Où sont les €" (Kaaris featuring SCH & Worms-T)	171	—	—	—	—		Double Fuck
2015	"On y est" (Lacrim featuring SCH, Rimkus & Walid)	103	—	—	—	—		R.I.P.R.O. Volume 2
2016	"Tony" (Kore, Lacrim & SCH)	13	35* (Ultratip)	—	—	—		Pattaya (film soundtrack)
2016	"Mon frelo" (A.W.A Gang Remix) (Kore, Lapso Laps, Lacrim, Sadek & SCH)	75	—	—	—	—		Pattaya (film soundtrack)
2016	"Mauvais payeur" (Niska featuring SCH)	128	—	—	—	—		Zifukoro
2016	"Balenciaga" (Sfera Ebbasta featuring SCH)	—	—	—	—	—		Sfera Ebbasta
2016	"La paresse" (Sadek featuring SCH)	130	—	—	—	—	SNEP: Gold	Nique le casino
2017	"Rien de lavable" (Rim'k feat. SCH)	70	—	—	—	—		Fantôme
2017	"Laisse-les" (Lacrim feat. SCH)	27	—	—	—	—		Force & honneur
2018	"International Gangstas" (Farid Bang featuring Capo, 6ix9ine & SCH)	133	—	8	5	11		International Gangstas
2018	"Hier" (PLK feat. SCH)	16	—	—	—	—	SNEP: Platinum	Polak
2018	"Caractère" (Kofs feat. SCH)	128	—	—	—	—		V
2019	"Cigarette" (Kaaris feat. SCH)	12	—	—	—	—		Or noir Part 3
2019	"HS" (Hamza feat. SCH)	7	20	—	—	—	SNEP: Platinum	Paradise
2019	"Dernier retrait" (Vald feat. SCH)	5	—	93	—	—		Ce monde est cruel
2019	"Solvable, partie 1" (Niro feat. SCH)	67	—	—	—	—		
2020	"Maryline" (Soolking feat. SCH)	70	—	—	—	—		non-album release
2020	"Smile" (Lefa feat. SCH)	35	29* (Ultratip)	—	—	—	SNEP: Platinum	Lefa album Famous
2020	"Bande organisée" (Jul, SCH, Naps, Kofs, Elams, Solda, Houari and Soso Maness)	1	2	7	—	—	SNEP: Diamond; BRMA: Platinum	
2020	"L'étoile sur le maillot" (L'Algérino - Alonzo - Stone Black - Le Rat Luciano - SCH - Jul - As - Veazy)	3	48	71	—	—		13 Organisé
2020	"C'est maintenant" (Sat l'Artificier - Alonzo - Kofs - Naps - Sch - Jul - Kamikaz - L'Algérino)	21	—	—	—	—		13 Organisé
2020	"Je suis Marseille" (Akhenaton - Jul - L'Algérino - Alonzo - Shurik'n - Fahar - Sch - Le Rat Luciano)	12	—	—	—	—		13 Organisé
2020	"American Airlines" (Sofiane feat. SCH)	18	19* (Ultratip)	—	—	—		non-album release
2020	"9 1 1 3" (Zola feat. SCH)	1	38	51	—	—	SNEP: Diamond	
2020	"Valise" (Rim'K feat. Koba LaD and SCH)	46	—	—	—	—	SNEP: Gold	
2021	"La vie du binks" (Da Uzi, Ninho & SCH feat. Hornet La Frappe, Leto, Sadek & Soprano)	5	6* (Ultratip)	—	—	—	SNEP: Platinum	non-album release
2021	"Kimono" (Sadek feat. SCH & Ninho)	8	—	—	—	—		Sadek album Aimons-nous vivants
2021	"Avengers" (Naps feat. Jul, Sch & Kalif Hardcore)	12	—	—	—	—	SNEP: Gold	Naps album Best Life
2022	"Speciale" (Fresh featuring Sch)	40	—	—	—	—		

*Did not appear in the official Belgian Ultratop 50 charts, but rather in the bubbling under Ultratip charts.

=== Other charted songs ===
Year	Title	Peak position			Certifications	Album
Year	Title	FRA	BEL (Wa)	SWI	Certifications	Album
2015	"Millions"	172	—	—		R.I.P.R.O. Volume 1
2015	"Gomorra"	118	—	—		A7
2015	"Liquide" (featuring Lacrim)	59	—	—		A7
2015	"Solides"	191	—	—		A7
2015	"Rêves de gosse"	180	—	—		A7
2015	"Drogue prohibée"	179	—	—		A7
2015	"J'reviens de loin"	128	—	—		A7
2015	"Pas de manières" (featuring Sadek + Lapso)	119	—	—		A7
2016	"Allô maman"	29	43* (Ultratip)	—	SNEP: Diamond	Anarchie
2016	"Dix-neuf"	53	—	—	SNEP: Gold	Anarchie
2016	"Himalaya"	84	—	—	SNEP: Gold	Anarchie
2016	"Cartine Cartier" (featuring Sfera Ebbasta)	88	—	—	SNEP: Gold	Anarchie
2016	"Murcielago"	106	—	—		Anarchie
2016	"Neuer"	113	—	—		Anarchie
2016	"Trop énorme"	117	—	—		Anarchie
2016	"Essuie tes larmes"	136	—	—		Anarchie
2016	"Le doc"	179	—	—	SNEP: Gold	Anarchie
2017	"Poupee russe"	17	8* (Ultratip)	—	SNEP: Gold	Deo Favente
2017	"Nino Brown"	20	—	—	SNEP: Gold	Deo Favente
2017	"Mac 11"	23	—	—	SNEP: Platinum	Deo Favente
2017	"J'attends"	29	—	—	SNEP: Gold	Deo Favente
2017	"Allez leur dire"	34	—	—		Deo Favente
2017	"Les années de plomb"	41	—	—		Deo Favente
2017	"Ça va" (featuring Lacrim)	42	—	—		Deo Favente
2017	"Day Date"	47	—	—		Deo Favente
2017	"Pas la paix"	49	—	—		Deo Favente
2017	"Météore"	70	—	—		Deo Favente
2017	"Temps mort"	76	—	—		Deo Favente
2017	"La nuit"	80	—	—	SNEP: Gold	Deo Favente
2017	"Ma kush"	85	—	—		Deo Favente
2017	"Slow mo"	89	—	—		Deo Favente
2018	"Pharmacie"	19	15* (Ultratip)	—	SNEP: Gold	Jvlivs [Tome 1 - Absolu]
2018	"Prêt à partir" (feat. Ninho)	2	—	—	SNEP: Diamond	Jvlivs [Tome 1 - Absolu]
2018	"Vntm"	8	—	—	SNEP: Gold	Jvlivs [Tome 1 - Absolu]
2018	"Le code"	10	—	—	SNEP: Diamond	Jvlivs [Tome 1 - Absolu]
2018	"Tokarev"	18	—	—	SNEP: Gold	Jvlivs [Tome 1 - Absolu]
2018	"Facile"	23	—	—		Jvlivs [Tome 1 - Absolu]
2018	"Skydweller"	24	—	—	SNEP: Platinum	Jvlivs [Tome 1 - Absolu]
2018	"Ivresse & Hennessy"	29	—	—		Jvlivs [Tome 1 - Absolu]
2018	"Incompris"	35	—	—		Jvlivs [Tome 1 - Absolu]
2018	"Bénéfice"	38	—	—	SNEP: Platinum	Jvlivs [Tome 1 - Absolu]
2018	"Ciel rouge"	41	—	—	SNEP: Gold	Jvlivs [Tome 1 - Absolu]
2018	"J't'en prie"	48	—	—		Jvlivs [Tome 1 - Absolu]
2019	"Cervelle"	29	—	—	SNEP: Gold	Rooftop
2019	"Petit coeur"	40	—	—	SNEP: Gold	Rooftop
2019	"All Eyes on Me"	42	—	—	SNEP: Gold	Rooftop
2019	"Baden Baden" (feat. Maître Gims)	59	16* (Ultratip)	—	SNEP: Gold	Rooftop
2019	"Interlude"	65	—	—	SNEP: Platinum	Rooftop
2019	"Tant pis"	68	—	—		Rooftop
2019	"Paye"	87	—	—		Rooftop
2019	"Ciment"	109	—	—		Rooftop
2019	"Ah gars"	111	—	—		Rooftop
2019	"Tirer un trait"	120	—	—		Rooftop
2019	"Mother Fuck" (with Jul)	1	32	59	SNEP: Diamond	Rooftop
2021	"Loup noir"	4	—	—	SNEP: Platinum	Jvlivs II
2021	"Mode akimbo" (feat. Jul)	2	—	29	SNEP: Diamond	Jvlivs II
2021	"Crack"	3	—	30	SNEP: Platinum	Jvlivs II
2021	"Grand bain"	5	—	—	SNEP: Gold	Jvlivs II
2021	"Fournaise"	6	—	—	SNEP: Gold	Jvlivs II
2021	"Zone à danger"	8	—	—	SNEP: Gold	Jvlivs II
2021	"Parano"	9	—	—	SNEP: Gold	Jvlivs II
2021	"Aluminium"	10	—	—	SNEP: Gold	Jvlivs II
2021	"Corrida"	11	—	—	SNEP: Platinum	Jvlivs II
2021	"Euro"	12	—	—	SNEP: Gold	Jvlivs II
2021	"Assoces"	13	—	—	SNEP: Gold	Jvlivs II
2021	"Raisons"	16	—	—	SNEP: Gold	Jvlivs II
2021	"Mafia"	17	—	—	SNEP: Gold	Jvlivs II
2021	"Plus rien à se dire"	18	—	—	SNEP: Gold	Jvlivs II
2021	"La battue"	21	—	—		Jvlivs II
2021	"Le coup d'avance"	22	—	—		Jvlivs II
2021	"Gibraltar"	18	—	—		Jvlivs II
2022	"Offshore"	14	—	—		Autobahn
2022	"Transmission Automatique"	16	—	—		Autobahn
2022	"Vivienne Westwood"	24	—	—		Autobahn
2022	"83K"	28	—	—		Autobahn
2022	"Blue Bahamas"	30	—	—		Autobahn
2022	"Lilou Dallas"	31	—	—		Autobahn
2022	"Blanc Bleu"	34	—	—		Autobahn
2022	"Actes"	35	—	—	SNEP: Gold	Autobahn
2022	"Cóur de Móme"	37	—	—		Autobahn
2024	"Crois-Moi"	11	—	—		Jvlivs Prequel: Giulio
2024	"Les Hommes Aux Yeux Noirs"	13	—	—		Jvlivs Prequel: Giulio
2024	"Garcimore"	16	—	—		Jvlivs Prequel: Giulio
2024	"Beaux-Arts"	20	—	—		Jvlivs Prequel: Giulio
2024	"Quoi"	28	—	—		Jvlivs Prequel: Giulio
2024	"Balafres"	29	—	—		Jvlivs Prequel: Giulio
2024	"Gris"	32	—	—		Jvlivs Prequel: Giulio
2024	"Ciel Bleu"	36	—	—		Jvlivs Prequel: Giulio
2024	"Jimmy Twice"	41	—	—		Jvlivs Prequel: Giulio
2024	"Calabre"	43	—	—		Jvlivs Prequel: Giulio
2024	"Hells Kitchen"	53	—	—		Jvlivs Prequel: Giulio
2024	"Batterie Vide"	60	—	—		Jvlivs Prequel: Giulio
2024	"La Recette"	65	—	—		Jvlivs Prequel: Giulio
2024	"Le Baptéme"	66	—	—		Jvlivs Prequel: Giulio
2024	"La Renaissance"	71	—	—		Jvlivs Prequel: Giulio
2024	"L'Opinel"	91	—	—		Jvlivs Prequel: Giulio
2024	"Deux Mille"	8	—	—	SNEP: Gold	Jvlivs III: Ad finem
2024	"La Pluie"	12	—	—	SNEP: Gold	Jvlivs III: Ad finem
2024	"Soldi Famiglia" (with Sfera Ebbasta)	18	—	—		Jvlivs III: Ad finem
2024	"Miroirs"	21	—	—		Jvlivs III: Ad finem
2024	"Dans La Tête"	23	—	—		Jvlivs III: Ad finem
2024	"Le Taulier"	25	—	—		Jvlivs III: Ad finem
2024	"Multirècidiviste"	29	—	—		Jvlivs III: Ad finem
2024	"Rose Noire"	31	—	—		Jvlivs III: Ad finem
2024	"Missles"	32	—	—		Jvlivs III: Ad finem
2024	"Anamnèse"	34	—	—		Jvlivs III: Ad finem
2024	"Quartiers Nord"	36	—	—		Jvlivs III: Ad finem
2024	"D’Hier a Aujourd’Hui"	37	—	—		Jvlivs III: Ad finem
2024	"Lumière Blanche (Ad Finem)"	42	—	—		Jvlivs III: Ad finem
2024	"Interlude - Avversita"	46	—	—		Jvlivs III: Ad finem
2024	"Interlude - Jour D’Octobre"	50	—	—		Jvlivs III: Ad finem
2024	"Intro - Ego Sum"	64	—	—		Jvlivs III: Ad finem

*Did not appear in the official Belgian Ultratop 50 charts, but rather in the bubbling under Ultratip charts.

== August 2024 shootout ==
In the early morning of August 26th, 2024, on a road in the Grand Travers district of Mauguio-Carnon, following a showcase by SCH in a nearby La Grande-Motte nightclub, a car transporting several members of the rapper's entourage was hit by automatic gunfire from another vehicle transporting four people. The vehicle's passenger was killed, while the driver sustained life-threatening injuries. SCH was likely targeted, but changed cars at the end of his performance, which may have saved his life. A police investigation into the matter was opened.
