= Naps (rapper) =

French rapper (born 1986)

- Born: Nabil Boukhobza; 15 February 1986 (age 40); Marseille, France
- Genres: Hip hop, French rap, gangsta rap
- Occupation: Rapper
- Years active: 2014–present
- Labels: Talent Factory Ltd, Charo Prod, Capitol, Universal

Nabil Boukhobza (born 15 February 1986), better known by the stage name Naps, is a French rapper of Algerian origin. Coming from a suburb that is home to the Bel Air housing estate in Marseille, he started rapping in 2001 at the age of 15. Two years later he formed Click 11.43 with two other rappers, KOFS and Sahime. The formation had considerable following particularly with the incarcerated population in France. Naps also released his own solo materials and collaborated with many other artists.

Starting in 2021, he was accused of rape and sexual assault by several women and was imprisoned on multiple occasions beginning in 2024.,,,

== Discography ==
=== Albums ===
Title	Year	Peak positions			Certification
Title	Year	FRA	BEL (Wa)	SWI	Certification
Ma ville & ma vie	2015	166	—	—	
Pochon bleu	2017	4	46	—	2× Platinum
À l'instinct	2018	3	27	—	Platinum
On est fait pour ça	2019	2	20	27	
SUI VIP	2020	3	14	30	
Les mains faites pour l'or	2021	1	13	13	
Best Life	2021	1	7	19	
La TN (Team Naps)	2022	2	13	14	
En temps réel	2023	1	12	12	
Mec de cité simple	2024	4	15	65	

=== Singles ===
==== As lead artist ====
Title	Year	Peak positions			Album
Title	Year	FRA	BEL (Wa)	SWI	Album
"Ciao"	2017	47	Tip	—	Pochon bleu
"Pochon bleu" (featuring 13ème Art, Graya, Kalif, Raisse & YL)	2017	91	Tip	—	Pochon bleu
"Recherché"	2018	13	32 (Ultratip*)	—	À l'instinct
"Carré VIP"	2020	25	—	—	Carré VIP
"6.3" (featuring Ninho)	2020	1	31	37	Carré VIP
"La Kiffance"	2021	1	5	18	
"Ma play" (with Naza & KeBlack)	2021	130	—	—	
"Best Life" (featuring Gims)	2021	5	39	—	Best Life
"Vamos" (featuring Gazo)	2021	4	—	—	
"C'est carré le S" (featuring Gazo and Ninho)	2023	1	21	27	En temps réel

*Did not appear in the official Belgian Ultratop 50 charts, but rather in the bubbling under Ultratip charts.

==== As featured artist ====
Title	Year	Peak positions		Album
Title	Year	FRA	BEL (Wa)	Album
"Les 4 fantastiques" (L'Algérino featuring Soprano, Naps & Alonzo)	2018	101	—	L'Algérino album International
"Riz au lait" (Kofs feat. Naps)	2020	104	—	Kofs album Santé & bonheur
"J'me casse" (YL feat. Naps)	2020	134	—	YL album Compte de faits
"Mi corazon" (Bramsito feat. Naps)	2020	173	—	Bramsito album Losa
"Bande organisée" (Jul, SCH, Naps, Kofs, Elams, Solda, Houari and Soso Maness)	2020	1	2	13 Organisé
"13 balles" (Kofs - Moh - 100 Blaze - Jul - Naps - Dadinho - A-Deal - Zak & Diego)	2020	4	—	13 Organisé
"War Zone" (Thabiti - Naps - Alonzo - Houari - Jul - As - Zbig - AM La Scampia)	2020	14	—	13 Organisé
"C'est maintenant" (Sat l'Artificier - Alonzo - Kofs - Naps - Sch - Jul - Kamikaz - L'Algérino)	2020	21	—	13 Organisé
"Guytoune" (Jul feat. Naps)	2020	16	—	Jul album Loin du monde
"Ça suffit pas" (Benab feat. Naps)	2021	56	—	Benab album Au clair de la rue (Part. 1)
"La seleçao" (Alonzo feat. Jul & Naps)	2021	2	36	Alonzo album Capo dei capi - Vol. II & III
"En bas d'chez moi" (Zaho feat. Naps)	2021	118	—	
"C'est la cité" (Jul feat. Naps)	2021	13	—	Jul album Demain ça ira
"Mexico" (Thabiti feat. Naps)	2021	13	—	
"DouDou" (Koba LaD feat. Naps)	2021	4	—	
"On a l'Habitude (Ok Many)" (Vegedream feat. Naps)	2022	94	—	
"Blue" (Kaneki feat. Ninho and Naps)	2023	11	—	

=== Other charted songs ===
Title	Year	Peak positions		Album
Title	Year	FRA	BEL (Wa)	Album
"Caprisun"	2017	68	—	
"À part ça"	2017	69	—	Pochon bleu
"Vroum vroum"	2017	87	—	Pochon bleu
"Ma bella"	2017	90	—	Pochon bleu
"Elvira"	2017	95	—	Pochon bleu
"Je repense à tout" (feat. Medi Meyz)	2017	135	—	Pochon bleu
"LV" (feat. Dika)	2017	150	—	Pochon bleu
"Folle"	2017	157	—	Pochon bleu
"Le zin / La zine"	2017	162	—	Pochon bleu
"Elle t'a piqué" (feat. 13ème Art)	2017	165	—	Pochon bleu
"Raisse" (feat. 13ème Art)	2017	181	—	Pochon bleu
"Pas bella" (feat. Kalif)	2017	188	—	Pochon bleu
"Zeillo" (feat. Kalif & Graya)	2017	198	—	Pochon bleu
"Le sens des affaires" (feat. Rim'K)	2017	116	—	
"Dans le block" (feat. Alonzo)	2018	24	—	À l'instinct
"Favela" (feat. Soolking)	2018	21	Tip	À l'instinct
"Marseille City"	2018	50	—	À l'instinct
"Mektoub" (feat. Kalif)	2018	79	—	À l'instinct
"Ma bella"	2018	90	—	À l'instinct
"Non non"	2018	97	—	À l'instinct
"Coché"	2018	109	—	À l'instinct
"Drive"	2018	110	—	À l'instinct
"Parle pas de nous" (feat. Fianso & Le Rat Luciano)	2018	116	—	À l'instinct
"Le fixe"	2018	118	—	À l'instinct
"Poto" (feat. Raisse)	2018	124	—	À l'instinct
"Abandonne"	2018	125	—	À l'instinct
"Drogua"	2018	132	—	À l'instinct
"9 milli"	2018	133	—	À l'instinct
"Je suis"	2018	141	—	À l'instinct
"Oulala" (feat. Messao)	2018	160	—	À l'instinct
"Piste blanche"	2018	165	—	À l'instinct
"Des fois"	2018	166	—	À l'instinct
"Le couz"	2018	94	—	Taxi 5
"On est fait pour ça"	2019	74	—	On est fait pour ça
"Rappelle-toi" (feat. Heuss L'Enfoiré)	2019	25	32 (Ultratip*)	On est fait pour ça
"Vovo"	2019	101	—	On est fait pour ça
"C'est la guerre" (feat. Rohff)	2019	120	—	On est fait pour ça
"Malade" (feat. AM La Scampia)	2019	122	—	On est fait pour ça
"Fortuné" (feat. Lacrim)	2019	124	—	On est fait pour ça
"On passe le temps" (feat. Mister You)	2019	129	—	On est fait pour ça
"Vito"	2019	136	—	On est fait pour ça
"Evidemment" (feat. Kalif Hardcore)	2019	140	—	On est fait pour ça
"Tokyo"	2019	151	—	On est fait pour ça
"Destination"	2019	170	—	On est fait pour ça
"Sur le banc" (feat. Sofiane, Dika & Kalif)	2019	172	—	On est fait pour ça
"Medellin" (feat. Soolking)	2019	176	—	On est fait pour ça
"Cap Canaveral"	2019	177	—	On est fait pour ça
"Pourcent" (feat. Maes)	2020	38	—	Carré VIP
"Pour eux (Naps feat. Vald)" (feat. Vald)	2020	90	—	Carré VIP
"Coffre-fort" (feat. SCH)	2020	95	—	Carré VIP
"Monica"	2020	110	—	Carré VIP
"Dans la villa"	2020	119	—	Carré VIP
"C'est ça les z'hommes"	2020	122	—	Carré VIP
"Sans toi"	2020	130	—	Carré VIP
"En fumette"	2020	142	—	Carré VIP
"En boucle"	2020	165	—	Carré VIP
"Polia"	2020	166	—	Carré VIP
"Carbone"	2020	190	—	Carré VIP
"Varadero"	2020	196	—	Carré VIP
"La danse des bandits"	2021	9	—	Les mains faites pour l'or
"Sans limites" (feat. Jul)	2021	62	—	Les mains faites pour l'or
"Tu connait les bails"	2021	66	—	Les mains faites pour l'or
"Mek du binks" (feat. Jul)	2021	98	—	Les mains faites pour l'or
"J'fait la passe"	2021	103	—	Les mains faites pour l'or
"Bandit crush"	2021	141	—	Les mains faites pour l'or
"5G"	2021	154	—	Les mains faites pour l'or
"Wesh wesh"	2021	156	—	Les mains faites pour l'or
"Perquè"	2021	165	—	Les mains faites pour l'or
"Elle"	2021	171	—	Les mains faites pour l'or
"Vodka cerise"	2021	171	—	Les mains faites pour l'or
"Tagada" (feat. Le Rat Luciano & Soolking)	2021	184	—	Les mains faites pour l'or
"Montagne d'euros"	2021	197	—	Les mains faites pour l'or
"C'est rien c'est la rue"	2021	25	—	Les mains faites pour l'or
"En détente"	2021	115	—	On est fait pour ça
"Avengers" (feat. Jul, Sch & Kalif Hardcore)	2021	12	—	Best Life
"C'est rien c'est la rue"	2021	25	—	Best Life
"Chicha kaloud" (feat. Sofiane & Kalif Hardcore)	2021	34	—	Best Life
"Chiron" (feat. Wejdene)	2021	37	—	Best Life
"Ma wife"	2021	65	—	Best Life
"Artiste"	2021	84	—	Best Life
"Okay Okay"	2021	91	—	Best Life
"Nous aussi"	2021	93	—	Best Life
"J'dis ça j'dis rien"	2021	95	—	Best Life
"Ambiance vandale"	2021	96	—	Best Life
"Jet privé"	2021	112	—	Best Life
"A / R"	2021	120	—	Best Life
"Vie de reusta"	2021	135	—	Best Life
"Certification"	2021	178	—	Best Life
"Pépita"	2021	189	—	Best Life
"Je suis cramé" (feat. Ivory)	2021	196	—	Best Life
"Top artiste"	2021	199	—	Best Life
"Ma Belleuh"	2023	55	—	En temps réel
"Purple"	2023	68	—	En temps réel
"Le Fruit De Mon Époque"	2023	76	—	En temps réel

*Did not appear in the official Belgian Ultratop 50 charts, but rather in the bubbling under Ultratip charts.

== Legal issues ==
=== Disruption of a TGV train and theft ===
In 2013, after disrupting TGV traffic near Marseille, and attacking the occupants of a stopped TGV, Naps is arrested and charged with theft committed by a group, intentional damage to public property committed by a group, obstruction of rail traffic, and participation in a gathering with the intent to commit vandalism.

=== Rape ===
On 19 February 2026, Naps is found guilty of raping a 20-year-old woman on 30 September 2021 in Paris. He is sentenced to 7 years in jail with immediate incarceration, 7 years of ineligibility in France, and will be registered as a sex offender in France.
