= Leïla Sy =

French film director (born 1977)

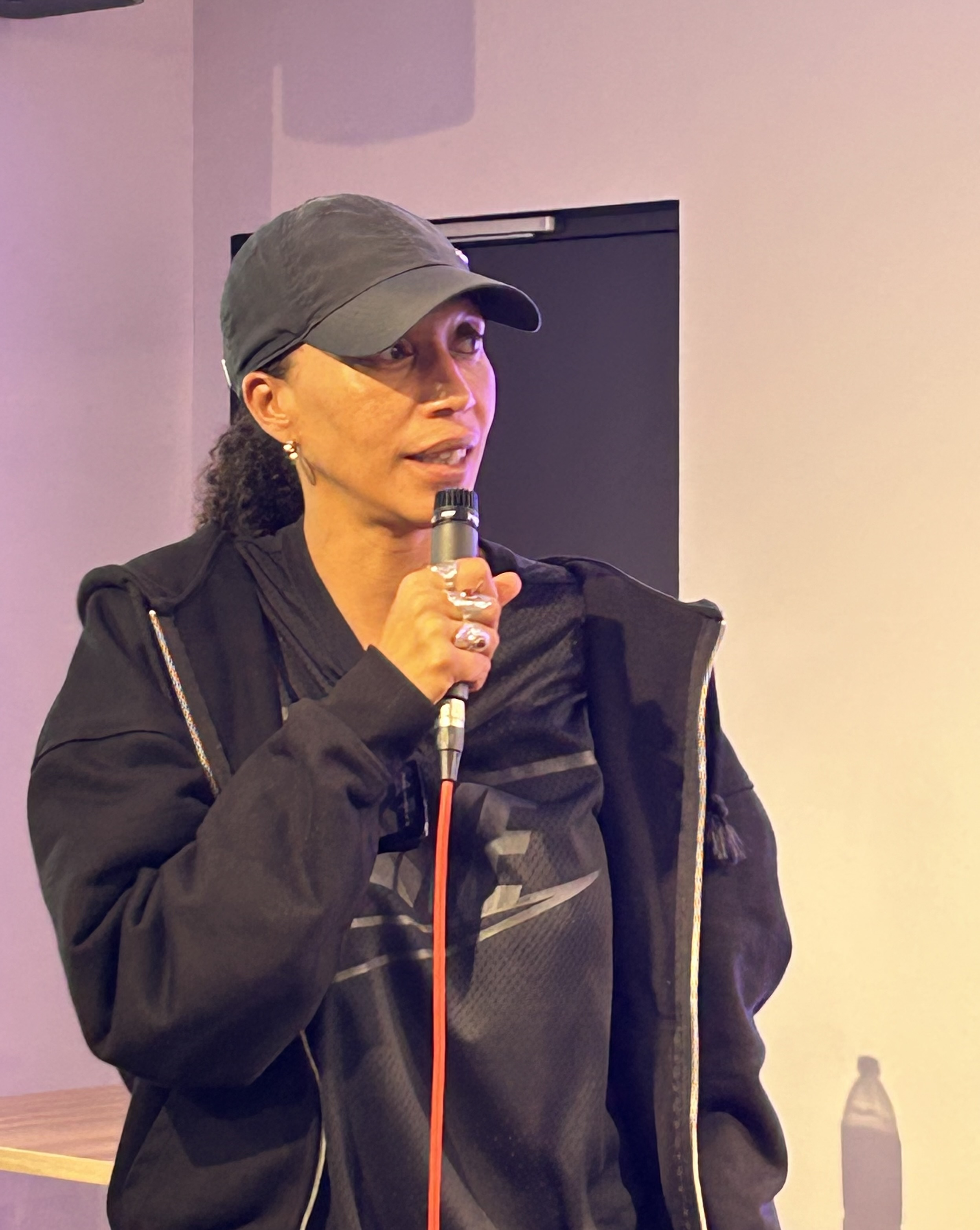
- Born: Leïla Dixmier; June 30, 1977 (age 49)
- Occupations: Film director; Screenwriter; Editor
- Known for: French director and activist
- Notable work: Street Flow (2019)

Leïla Sy (born Leïla Dixmier; 30 June 1977), is a French director and activist. She is known for her work with rapper Kery James, including co-directing the film Street Flow.

== Biography ==
Leïla Sy was born Leïla Dixmier on June 30, 1977 to a French mother and Senegalese father.

After attending the arts school Penninghen, she began her career in French hip hop in the press: first working at Track List, she later became the artistic director of the French version of The Source.

In 2005, she founded, along with Joeystarr whom she is in a relationship with, the organization Devoirs de mémoires. Sy serves as the organization's president. In 2017, Sy was named a member of the public interest group creating the Fondation pour la mémoire de l'esclavage (Foundation for the memory of slavery).

Since 2016, she has created music videos for rapper Kerry James such as "Musique nègre" ("Black Music"), for whom she is the artistic director. They created their first feature film in 2019, Street Flow, with a script written by the rapper and directed by James and Sy. The film was released on Netflix in October, 2019.

== Filmography ==
=== Fiction ===
- 2019 : Je t'aim3, épisode Entre chien et Lou (court métrage) with Vald (rapper)
- 2019 : Street Flow, with Kery James
- 2023 : Yo Mama, with Amadou Mariko
- 2023 : Street Flow 2, with Kery James

=== Documentary ===
- 2011 : Rîmes et Châtiments

=== Music videos ===
List is not exhaustive

- 2009 : Je représente by Kery James
- 2009 : Le Retour du rap français by Kery James
- 2012 : Heart Stop by Wax Tailor, co-directed by Mathieu Foucher
- 2012 : Lettre à la République by Kery James, directed by Mathieu Foucher
- 2012 : Dernier MC by Kery James
- 2013 : Constat amer by Kery James
- 2013 : À l'horizon by Kery James ft. Corneille
- 2013 : Mystère féminin by Kery James ft. Imany
- 2013 : Contre nous by Kery James ft. Youssoupha & Médine, directed by Kub&Cristo
- 2013 : Post Scriptum by Kery James
- 2014 : Paris by Tunisiano
- 2014 : Bolchoï by Soviet Suprem
- 2016 : Vivre ou mourir ensemble by Kery James
- 2016 : N'importe quoi by Kery James
- 2016 : Racailles by Kery James
- 2016 : Musique nègre by Kery James ft. Lino & Youssoupha
- 2016 : J'suis pas un héros by Kery James
- 2016 : Game of Bells by LEJ
- 2016 : Le Prix by Rockin' Squat
- 2018 : PDM by Kery James
- 2018 : J'rap encore by Kery James
- 2018 : Amal by Kery James
- 2018 : Sur le drapeau by 93 Empire (Suprême NTM x Sofiane)
- 2018 : À la Ideal J by Kery James
- 2018 : Le jour où j'arrêterai le rap by Kery James
- 2018 : Woah by 93 Empire (Sofiane, Vald, Soolking, Sadek, Mac Tyer, Heuss l'Enfoiré, Kalash Criminel)
- 2018 : Rêves de gamin by Nassi
- 2019 : Khapta by Heuss l'Enfoiré ft. Sofiane
- 2019 : À qui la faute by Kery James ft. Orelsan
- 2019 : Les Yeux mouillés by Kery James ft. Youssoupha
- 2019 : Le Mélancolique by Kery James (réalisé avec Julien Faustino)
- 2020 : Calumet by Hornet La Frappe
- 2020 : Blues by Kery James ft. Féfé
- 2020 : Lundi méchant by Gaël Faye
- 2020 : Outro by Lyna Mahyem
- 2020 : Control by Bilal Hassani
- 2021 : Le Goût de vivre by Kery James
- 2021 : Boomer by Gaël Faye

=== Awareness campaign ===
- 2016 : The Sound of Silence for the Centre Primo Levi
