= The Misadventures of Hedi and Cokeman =

2021 French film

- Film poster
- French: En Passant Pécho: Les Carottes Sont Cuites
- Directed by: Julien Hollande
- Written by: Julien Hollande; Nassim Lyes
- Starring: Nassim Lyes; Fred Testot; Julie Ferrier
- Release date: 10 February 2021
- Running time: 99 minutes
- Country: France
- Language: French

The Misadventures of Hedi and Cokeman (French: En Passant Pécho: Les Carottes Sont Cuites) is a 2021 French film directed by Julien Hollande, written by Julien Hollande and Nassim Lyes and starring Nassim Lyes, Fred Testot and Julie Ferrier.

== Synopsis ==
In Paris, two dysfunctional drug dealers use family ties to try and boost their business.

== Cast ==
- Nassim Lyes as Cokeman
- Fred Testot
- Julie Ferrier
- Hedi Bouchenafa as Hedi
- Julie Maes as Voisine de derrière
- Aymen Rahoui
- Ali Damiche

== Soundtrack ==
ِThe soundtrack album peaked at number 5 in the French Albums Chart and also charted in Belgium and Switzerland. All album tracks are by producer Kore in collaboration with artists indicated below:

- Sadek - "Gambas"
- Lacrim - "Mango"
- Timal - "Cramé"
- Heuss L'Enfoiré - "Gucci Versace"
- Stavo feat. Ashe 22 - "Balafre"
- Ninho - "Mon poto"
- PLK - "Pas bien"
- Gazo - "Message groupé"
- RK - "Mañana"
- Vald- "Baby"
- Da Uzi - "Perdu"
- Kore - Hedi, Cokeman "Interlude"
- Soso Maness feat. Nahir - "Lewandowski"
- Zola - "Adelanto"
- Leto - "On ira loin"
- Lyonzon - "Astrid Chanel Elodie"
- Naza - "Nouvelle séquence"
- Luv Resval, Alkpote - "Célébration 2"
- Doria, Sifax - "Tout va vite"
- Kalash Criminel - "Netflix"
- Werenoi - "Tucibi"
- Zoupouti, Fetiche - "Zone 6"
