= Dinos (rapper) =

French rapper

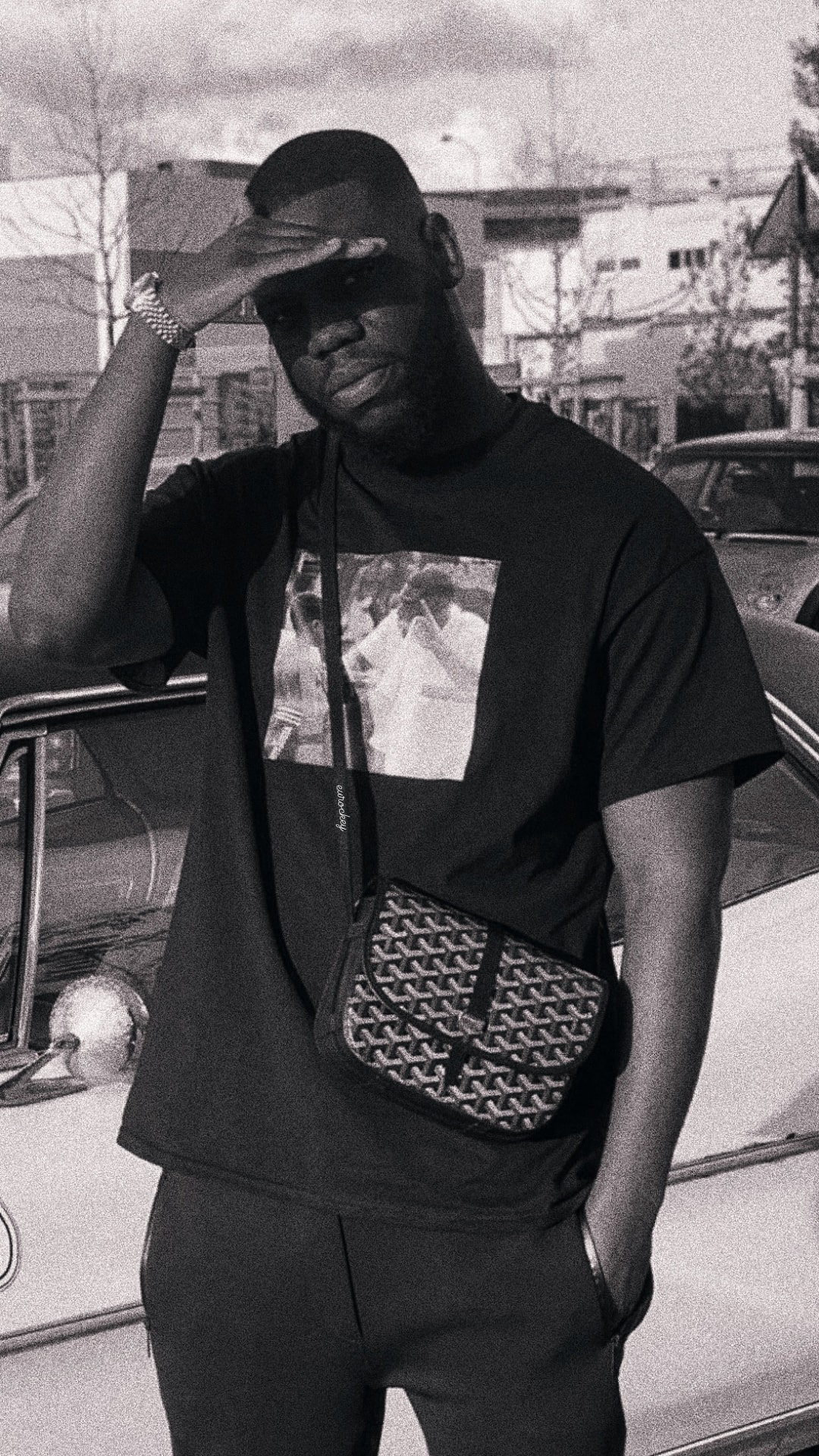
- Dinos in 2020

Background information
- Also known as: Dinos Punchlinovic
- Born: Jules Jomby; 30 November 1993 (age 32); Douala, Cameroon
- Origin: La Courneuve, France
- Genre: French rap
- Occupation: Rapper
- Years active: 2011-present
- Labels: SPKTAQLR, Capitol Music France

Jules Jomby (born 30 November 1993), better known by the stage name Dinos (formerly known as Dinos Punchlinovic), is a French rapper from La Courneuve, Seine-Saint-Denis.

== History ==
=== Early life ===
Dinos was born in Douala, Cameroon. He moved to La Courneuve, France at the age of 4.

=== Career ===
He released his first project called Thumb Up in 2011, and began to make a name for himself in Paris' underground rap battles.

In May 2013, Dinos signed to Def Jam France, and on 3 June 2013 he released an EP titled L'Alchimiste in reference to Paulo Coelho's book of the same name.

In 2014, Dinos left Def Jam France for Capitol Music France and released, on 14 April 2014, a second EP titled Appearances, supported by the song "Namek"; which was Dinos' first success.

After a two-year hiatus, Dinos announced his debut album Imany. Between the announcement of this album and its release, he dropped Pas Imany mais presque in 2016. Dinos marked his return on 8 December 2017 with the single Flashé. On 30 March 2018 he unveiled the single Les pleurs du mal. On 27 April 2018 Dinos finally released Imany, his first studio album. On 20 August 2018 Dinos appeared in "Colors", a popular German music show on YouTube, and delivered a live performance of his song Argentique. On 7 December 2018 the artist released a "Deluxe" edition of Imany.

On 29 November 2019 Dinos released his second studio album, Taciturne.

== Discography ==
=== Studio albums ===
Title	Year	Peak positions			
Title	Year	FRA	BEL (Fl)	BEL (Wa)	SWI
Imany	2018	24	—	65	—
Taciturne	2019	16	—	20	62
Stamina, Memento	2020	3	63	3	10
Hiver à Paris	2022	1	169	2	6
Kintsugi	2024	2	—	10	10

=== Singles ===
Title	Year	Peak positions			Album
Title	Year	FRA	BEL (Wa)	SWI	Album
"Moins un" (feat. Nekfeu)	2020	1	27	49	Stamina,

=== Featuring in ===
Title	Year	Peak positions		Album
Title	Year	FRA	BEL (Wa)	Album
"Kash" (Youssoupha feat. Dinos & Lefa)	2021	96	—	
"Number" (Kaza feat. Dinos)	2021	105	—	Toxic
"DM" (Bolémvn feat. Dinos)	2021	156	—	

=== Other charted songs ===
Title	Year	Peak positions		Album
Title	Year	FRA	BEL (Wa)	Album
"Drive By" (with Sadek & Ixzo)	2018	103	—	93 Empire
"Viens dans mon 93" (with Hornet La Frappe & Sofiane)	2018	159	—	93 Empire
"Placebo"	2018	181	—	
"XNXX"	2019	128	—	Taciturne
"Oskur"	2019	183	—	Taciturne
"Inachevé"	2020	187	—	
"Paranoïaque"	2020	9	—	Stamina,
"Prends soin de toi"	2020	10	—	Stamina,
"Diptyque"	2020	11	—	Stamina,
"Maman m'aime" (feat. Da Uzi)	2020	12	—	Stamina,
"93 mesures"	2020	14	—	Stamina,
"Demain n'existe plus"	2020	19	—	Stamina,
"Césaire"	2020	23	22* (Ultratip)	Stamina,
"Ciel pleure" (feat. Laylow)	2020	24	—	Stamina,
"Le nord se souvient" (feat. Leto)	2020	29	—	Stamina,
"Judas" (feat. Zefor & Zikxo)	2020	31	—	Stamina,
"Madone"	2020	39	—	Stamina,
"Corbillard"	2020	47	—	Stamina,
"No Love" (feat. Marie Plassard)	2021	164	—	Taciturne
"Du mal à te dire" (feat. Damso)	2021	16	—	Stamina,
"El pichichi"	2021	85	—	Stamina,
"Prends mes lovés" (feat. Tiakola)	2021	88	—	Stamina,
"5711"	2021	95	—	Stamina,
"FMR"	2021	98	—	Stamina,
"Future ex"	2021	109	—	Stamina,
"Tulum"	2021	125	—	Stamina,
"Memento Interlude" (feat. Charlotte Cardin)	2021	155	—	Stamina,
"Surcoté"	2021	161	—	Stamina,
"Serpentaire" (feat. Lossapardo)	2021	168	—	Stamina,
"Walther PP" (feat. Benjamin Epps)	2021	169	—	Stamina,
"Chrome Hearts" (feat. Hamza)	2022	3	34	Hiver à Paris
"Portes suicide" (feat. Ninho)	2022	5	48	Hiver à Paris
"Ma Baby"	2022	9	—	Hiver à Paris
"Pichichi Anderson"	2022	10	—	Hiver à Paris
"L'Univers Ne Nous Voit Pas Danser"	2022	13	—	Hiver à Paris
"Amg Performance"	2022	18	—	Hiver à Paris
"Modus Vivendi"	2022	22	—	Hiver à Paris
"Simyaci"	2022	23	—	Hiver à Paris
"Quatre Saisons"	2022	25	—	Hiver à Paris
"Par Amour"	2022	30	—	Hiver à Paris
"Rouge Drama"	2022	37	—	Hiver à Paris
"Ctrl + V"	2022	39	—	Hiver à Paris
"Solitaire 1895"	2022	43	—	Hiver à Paris
"Rue De Sevres"	2022	45	—	Hiver à Paris
"Future Nostalgia"	2022	52	—	Hiver à Paris
"Triste Anniversaire"	2022	55	—	Hiver à Paris
"Rive Droite"	2022	58	—	Hiver à Paris
"Rive Gauche"	2022	69	—	Hiver à Paris
"Aquarius"	2022	71	—	Hiver à Paris
"And"	2022	73	—	Hiver à Paris
"Interlude"	2022	77	—	Hiver à Paris

*Did not appear in the official Belgian Ultratop 50 charts, but rather in the bubbling under Ultratip charts.
