= Leto (rapper) =

French rapper

- Born: Henoc Pierrick Bofenda; November 27, 1997 (age 28); France
- Genres: Hip hop, trap, drill
- Occupation: Rapper
- Years active: 2014-present
- Label: Rec. 118

Henoc Pierrick Bofenda, better known by his stage name Leto, is a French rapper and part of the duo PSO Thug, a French hip-hop duo from the 17th arrondissement of Paris. PSO part refers to their origin as they come from Porte de Saint-Ouen (aka PSO) and are made up of Leto alongside Aéro. In 2014, they started with "Hors la loi". In February 2015, they published the precursor to their mixtape, entitled En attendant Demoniak. The duo released their first mixtape, named Demoniak, on May 20, 2016, and sold 1,319 copies in its first week of release.

Signed with Rec. 118, an affiliation of Warner Music France, Leto has pursued, besides his collaboration with Aero in PSO Thug, his solo career by releasing two separate mixtapes, Trap$tar and Trap$tar 2, in 2018 and 2019, respectively. Trap$tar 2 is a collaboration with Ninho in "Tes parents", giving him a charting hit in the Top 20 in France. In 2020, he released his EP Virus as an "avant-album" in preparation for a major release scheduled later this year with "Train de vie" featuring rapper PLK, reaching as high as #11 on the French charts. He is collaborating with Cheu-B, part of group XVBarbar, now known since 2019 as XV.

== Discography ==
=== Albums ===
Year	Title	Peak positions				Certifications
Year	Title	FR	BEL (FL)	BEL (WA)	SWI	Certifications
2020	100 visages	3	50	4	13	SNEP: Gold
2021	17%	1	36	4	10	SNEP: Platinum
2022	Jusqu'aux étoiles (with Guy2Bezbar)	6	—	15	30	
2024	Capitaine fait de l'art	—	—	16	—	SNEP: Gold
2025	Life	—	—	—	21	

=== EPs ===
Year	Title	Peak positions	
Year	Title	FR	BEL (WA)
2020	Virus: avant l'album	8	13

=== Mixtapes ===
As PSO Thug

- Demoniak (2016)
- Pause (2018)

Solo

Year	Title	Peak positions			Certifications
Year	Title	FR	BEL (WA)	SWI	Certifications
2018	Trap$tar	30	103	—	
2019	Trap$tar 2	10	26	52	SNEP: Platinum
2023	Trap$tar 3	—	4	7	

=== Singles ===
As part of PSO Thug

- 2016: "Plein les poches" (featuring Sadek) - Reached #184 in the French Singles chart

Solo

Year	Title	Peak positions			Certifications	Album / Mixtape
Year	Title	FR	BEL (WA)	SWI	Certifications	Album / Mixtape
2020	"Double Binks" (feat. Ninho & Zed)	18	—	—		Virus: avant l'album [EP]
2020	"Train de vie" (feat. PLK)	11	—	—	SNEP: Gold	Virus: avant l'album [EP]
2020	"Changer de vie"	27	—	—		Virus: avant l'album [EP]
2020	"Mec de la rue"	57	—	—		Virus: avant l'album [EP]
2020	"Drill Papers"	62	—	—		Virus: avant l'album [EP]
2020	"Paris c'est magique"	30	—	—		
2020	"Rock N Puff" (with RK)	123	—	—		
2020	"Nouveaux riches" (feat. Niska)	17	38* (Ultratip)	—		
2020	"Macaroni" (feat. Ninho)	2	40	36	SNEP: Platinum	100 visages
2021	"Sale histoire"	59	—	—		
2021	"Double L" (with Larry)	43	—	—		
2024	"Monaco"	4	—	—		
2024	"J'crois qu'ils ont pas compris"	—	13	—		
2026	"Pineapple"	4	41	52		

*Did not appear in the official Belgian Ultratop 50 charts, but rather in the bubbling under Ultratip charts.

=== Other charting songs ===
Year	Title	Peak positions			Certifications	Album / Mixtape
Year	Title	FR	BEL (WA)	SWI	Certifications	Album / Mixtape
2018	"Avon Barksdale"	124	—	—		Trap$tar
2019	"Double Bang 5"	164	—	—		
2019	"Double Bang 6"	152	—	—		
2019	"Double Bang 7"	184	—	—		
2019	"A&H"	184	—	—	SNEP: Gold	Trap$tar 2
2019	"Tes parents" (feat. Ninho)	18	9* (Ultratip)	—	SNEP: Platinum	Trap$tar 2
2019	"Tu déconnes" (feat. Rim'K)	125	—	—		Trap$tar 2
2020	"Double Bang 8"	89	—	—		
2020	"Booska 100 visages"	179	—	—		
2020	"Charbon" (feat. Booba)	27	—	—		100 visages
2020	"Mélodie"	33	—	—		100 visages
2020	"100 visages"	38	—	—		100 visages
2020	"Mozart"	44	—	—		100 visages
2020	"Tristesse"	51	—	—		100 visages
2020	"Nicki"	55	—	—		100 visages
2020	"Big Money" (feat. Lacrim)	57	—	—		100 visages
2020	"Le nord"	61	—	—		100 visages
2020	"T'es allée où?" (feat. Soolking)	74	—	—		100 visages
2020	"Détruire et aimer"	78	—	—		100 visages
2020	"Trafiquants"	84	—	—		100 visages
2020	"Gangsta"	89	—	—		100 visages
2021	"Vie de star" (feat. Ninho)	22	26 (Ultratip)	—		
2021	"Double bang 10"	12	—	—		
2021	"On ira loin" (with Kore	149	—	—		En Passant Pécho: Les Carottes Sont Cuites (soundtrack)
2021	"La calle 4 (favelas de Paname)" (with Guy2Bezbar)	92	—	—		non-album release
2021	"Tout recommencer"	67	—	—		non-album release
2021	"Mapessa" (feat. Tiakola)	6	—	64		17%
2021	"17%"	11	—	—		17%
2021	"Derrière nos tours" (feat. Maes)	16	—	—		17%
2021	"Power"	20	—	—		17%
2021	"Ouais Ouais" (feat. Hamza)	24	—	—		17%
2021	"Tout recommencer"	25	—	—		17%
2021	"Rihanna"	28	—	—		17%
2021	"Petit frère"	37	—	—		17%
2021	"Christian Dior" (feat. MHD)	42	—	—		17%
2021	"All Eyez On Me"	43	—	—		17%
2021	"Prada"	44	—	—		17%
2021	"T'avais raison"	46	—	—		17%
2021	"Jeune soldat"	52	—	—		17%
2021	"Franklin Saint"	56	—	—		17%
2021	"Truc en moi" (feat. Cheu-b & Kepler)	57	—	—		17%
2021	"Vibes"	58	—	—		17%
2021	"Outro"	59	—	—		17%

*Did not appear in the official Belgian Ultratop 50 charts, but rather in the bubbling under Ultratip charts.

=== Featured in ===
Year	Title	Peak positions		Certifications	Album / Mixtape
Year	Title	FR	BEL (WA)	Certifications	Album / Mixtape
2013	"Beckenpower" (XVBarbar feat. Leto)	—	—		Non-album single
2014	"Och Bad 2 (Bourbier)" (Hayce Lemsi feat. Skro, KranMax, A.D.K, Leso, Jack Mess, Leto, Papis, Cheu-B, Black D & Rislo)	—	—		Hayce Lemsi mixtape Électron libre
2015	"Ça sert à quoi ?" (Volts Face feat. PSO Thug)	—	—		Volts Face EP; Avant Trafalgar
2015	"Walking Dead" (Hayce Lemsi feat. Le S, A.D.K, Cheu-B, Black-D, Leto, Pispa, Aero, Leso, Jack Mess, Layone & KranMax)	—	—		Hayce Lemsi album L'Or des rois
2015	"Montre-moi" (KranMax feat. Leto)	—	—		Non-album single
2016	"Tej ta conss" (Coyote Jo Bastard feat. Leto)	—	—		Coyote Jo Bastard mixtaper La Mort avant la vie
2016	"Snitch" (BSK feat. Leto)	—	—		Non-album single
2016	"Sous mes draps" (La Massfa feat. Cheu-B, Leto & Jack Mess)	—	—		La Massfa mixtape Frères d'armes
2016	"10 minutes" (Black D feat. Leto)	—	—		Non-album single
2016	"C'est trop" (Sadek feat. Leto & Ninho)	—	—		Sadek album Nique le casino
2016	"Crésus" (Ninho feat. Leto)	—	—		Ninho mixtape M.I.L.S
2016	"String 2 cougar" (Alkpote feat. Leto)	—	—		Alkpote album Les Marches de l'Empereur
2016	"Daddy" (Coyote Jo Bastard feat. Leto & Sfera Ebbasta)	—	—		Coyote Jo Bastard album L'Enfer avant le paradis
2016	"Légendaires" (Cheu-B feat. Leto)	—	—		Non-album single
2017	"Extendo" (Jack Mess feat. Leto & The S)	—	—		Non-album single
2017	"Oseille" (GLK feat. Leto)	—	—		GLK album Murder (Réédition)
2017	"Boston George" (Cheu-B feat. Leto & Black D)	—	—		Cheu-B album Welcome to Skyland
2017	"Nous deux" (The S feat. Leto)	—	—		Non-album single
2018	"WOW" (The S feat. Leto & Volts Face)	—	—		Non-album single
2018	"Hood" (4Keus feat. Leto)	186	—		4Keus album La vie continue
2018	"Négro" (Ismo feat. Leto)	—	—		Non-album single
2018	"Old Up" (The S feat. Bosh, Elams, Riane, Zeguerre, Dabs, Krilino, Douma Kalash, Dibson, Leto, Grizzly942, Brvmsoo & Yaro)	—	—		Non-album single
2018	"Mauvaise influence" (Irvin de l'Impasse feat. Leto)	—	—		Non-album single
2018	"Non stop" (Myth Syzer feat. Leto)	—	—		Myth Syzer album Bisous mortels
2018	"Freestyle légendaire #5 (Dinero)" (O.R feat. Leto & Bosh)	—	—		Non-album single
2018	"Por favor" (Kino feat. Leto)	—	—		Non-album single
2018	"Dsquared" (Cheu-B feat. Leto)	—	—		Non-album single
2018	"Minuit" (Arka feat. Leto)	—	—		Arka mixtape Allen
2019	"Cash N Kush" (Junior Bvndo feat. Leto)	—	—		Junior Bvndo mixtape Direct t'es refait
2019	"Ultimate Trap" (Cheu-B feat. Leto, Kodes, Cinco & 100 Blaze)	—	—		Non-album single
2019	"Far West" (Brvmsoo feat. Leto)	—	—		Brvmsoo album Voilà
2019	"Allez" (Mel feat. Leto)	—	—		Non-album single
2019	"Bâtiment" (Cirfa feat. Leto, Cheu-B & Sadjo)	—	—		Non-album single
2019	"Splash" (Cheu-B feat. Leto)	—	—		Cheu-B album Icône
2019	"Benef" (Dinor feat. Leto)	—	—		Dinor album Lunettes 2 ski
2019	"Récidive" (Ismo feat. Leto)	—	—		Non-album single
2019	"Bâtiment" (Still Fresh feat. Leto & Yaro)	—	—		Still Fresh album Trapop 2
2019	"Gaine 'D 2.0" (Kingzer feat. Ninho & Leto)	—	—		Non-album single
2019	"Jeune papa" (Jok'Air feat. Leto & Kitsune Kendra)	—	—		Jok'Air album La fièvre
2019	"Touché coulé" (TLZ Clan feat. Leto)	—	—		Non-album single
2019	"Pour un jeu" (Kaza feat. Leto)	186	Tip		Non-album single
2019	"Si tu savais" (Ikaz Boi feat. Leto)	—	—		Ikaz Boi album Brutal 2
2019	"Alibi" (Rémy feat. Leto)	—	19* (Ultratip)	SNEP: Gold	Rémy album Rémy d'Auber
2020	"Mariah" (Still Fresh feat. Jok'Air & Leto)	—	—		Non-album single
2020	"Flashback" (4Keus feat. Leto)	57	—		4Keus album Vie d'artiste
2020	"C'est mort" (Hornet La Frappe feat. Leto & RK)	42	13* (Ultratip)		Hornet La Frappe album Ma ruche
2020	"Bad Bitch" (Yaro feat. Leto)	—	—		Yaro album La spé
2020	"Week-end" (Timal feat. Leto)	33	Tip		Timal album Caliente
2020	"Mauvaise humeur" (Josman feat. Leto)	—	—		Josman album Split
2020	"Mannequin" (with S.Pri Noir)	67	—		S.Pri Noir album État d'Esprit
2020	"Four" (Cinco feat. Leto)	159	—		Non-album release
2020	"Ma jolie" (Zola feat. Leto)	7	—		Zola album Survie
2020	"Le nord se souvient" (Dinos feat. Leto)	29	—		Dinos album Stamina,
2020	"Côté noir" (Maître Gims feat. Leto)	38	—		Maître Gims album Le Fléau
2021	"La vie du binks" (Da Uzi, Ninho & SCH feat. Hornet La Frappe, Leto, Sadek & Soprano)	5	6* (Ultratip)		Non-album release
2021	"HLM" (ZKR feat. Leto)	73	–		ZKR album Dans les mains

*Did not appear in the official Belgian Ultratop 50 charts, but rather in the bubbling under Ultratip charts.
