= Da Uzi =

French rapper

- Also known as: Le Libanais
- Born: Davy Ngoma Di Malonda; 29 August 1992 (age 34); Angers, Maine-et-Loire, Pays de la Loire, France
- Genres: Hip hop, trap
- Occupation: Rapper
- Years active: 2009–present
- Labels: Vrai2Vrai Industry; Rec. 118; Warner Music France

Davy Ngoma Di Malonda (born 29 August 1992), better known by his stage name Da Uzi (sometimes stylized as DA Uzi and pronounced Dé-A Uzi), is a French rapper.

== Early years ==
Davy Ngoma Di Malonda was born in 1992 in Angers, Pays de la Loire. He spent his early years until 11 years old in Villemomble and Villeparisis where he played soccer (soccer) in a local sports team. He then moved to live with his aunts in a community in Seine-et-Marne, and a year at Poitiers where he enrolled in a soccer school. At fifteen, he moved to Trois Tours, Sevran, Paris Region.

He wanted to pursue a career in soccer, but after an injury, he was dropped for treatment and spent the remaining part of his short sports career in third level competition at his club before quitting altogether at 15. After that, he started rapping and taking part in rap competitions specially at Villeparisis.

== Career ==
His beginnings in rap are still sketchy as he was imprisoned several times. But in 2016, he was noted for several freestyles efforts collected in the self-release La D en personne in 2017. At the end of that year, he was signed to Vrai2Vrai Industry and the rap label Rec 118, an affiliate of Warner Music. With the signing, he was featured in releases by of Sevran artists, including Maes and the 13 Block collective. His single with Ninho titled "Entre les murs" charted peaking at #62 on the SNEP French singles chart in 2018.

In 2019, DA Uzi released his mixtape Mexico that peaked at number 5 on the French Albums Chart in addition to 4 freestyle releases titled WeLaRue. His debut studio album Architecte was released on 3 April 2020 peaking at #1 in France, selling 9,700 copies in its first week of release, and eventually more than 50,000 copies and certified gold. "Crois-moi" featuring is his highest charting single reaching #3 in France.

== Discography ==
=== Albums ===
Year	Album	Peak positions				Certification
Year	Album	FRA	BEL (Fl)	BEL (Wa)	SWI	Certification
2020	Architecte	1	129	3	13	SNEP: Gold
2021	Vrai 2 vrai	3	—	3	22	SNEP: Gold
2022	Le chemin des braves	3	—	20	36	SNEP: Gold
2025	Original Gangster	4	—	—	—	

=== Mixtapes ===
Year	Album	Peak positions			Certification
Year	Album	FRA	BEL (Wa)	SWI	Certification
2018	La D en personne	—	—	—	
2019	Mexico	5	22	55	

Other releases

- 2014: Sans prétention Vol. 1 (self-published)

=== Singles ===
Year	Title	Peak positions		Album / Mixtape
Year	Title	FRA	BEL (Wa)	Album / Mixtape
2018	"Entre les murs" (feat. Ninho)	62	25* (Ultratip)	Mexico
2018	"La vraie vie"	74	—	Mexico
2019	"Mexico"	38	—	Mexico
2019	"WeLaRue#3 (Vilain)"	152	—	Non-album release
2019	"Plus belle la vie"	94	—	Architecte
2020	"Le dire" (feat. Maes)	28	33* (Ultratip)	Architecte
2020	"Crois-moi" (feat. Ninho)	3	13* (Ultratip)	Architecte
2021	"La vie du binks" (with Ninho & SCH feat. Hornet La Frappe, Leto, Sadek & Soprano)	5	6* (Ultratip)	Non-album release
2021	"Fermez-la"	157	—	Non-album release
2022	"On Se Reverra Plus (Feat. Gazo)	8	—	Non-album release
2025	"OTF" (Da Uzi feat. Ninho)	37	—	Original Gangster

*Did not appear in the official Belgian Ultratop 50 charts, but rather in the bubbling under Ultratip charts.

=== Featured in ===
Year	Title	Peak positions		Album / Mixtape
Year	Title	FRA	BEL (Wa)	Album / Mixtape
2018	"Dinero" (Lartiste, Da Uzi & Don Milli)	143	–	93 Empire
2019	"93% (Tijuana)" (GLK feat. Landy, Da Uzi & Hornet La Frappe)	13	9* (Ultratip)	GLK album Indécis
2020	"Zodiaque" (Soso Maness feat. Da Uzi)	50	–	Soso Maness album Mistral
2020	"Malfaiteurs" (YL feat. Da Uzi)	168	–	YL album Compte de faits
2020	"Maman m'aime" (Dinos feat. Da Uzi)	12	–	Dinos album Stamina,

*Did not appear in the official Belgian Ultratop 50 charts, but rather in the bubbling under Ultratip charts.

=== Other charting songs ===
Year	Title	Peak positions	Album / Mixtape
Year	Title	FRA	Album / Mixtape
2019	"D'une autre manière" (feat. Kaaris)	101	Mexico
2019	"J'entends des voix"	115	Mexico
2019	"Bonita"	116	Mexico
2019	"Dans la tour"	119	Mexico
2019	"Wey wey wey"	129	Mexico
2019	"Vrai 2 vrai"	132	Mexico
2019	"Cicatrices"	133	Mexico
2019	"La loi du talion" (feat. Sadek)	154	Mexico
2019	"Les ténèbres"	155	Mexico
2019	"Vision"	158	Mexico
2019	"Dernier samouraï"	168	Mexico
2019	"Mal aimé"	195	Mexico
2020	"Architecte"	44	Architecte
2020	"Style Haussmannien"	52	Architecte
2020	"Camila"	55	Architecte
2020	"Ni amour ni amité" (feat. SCH)	56	Architecte
2020	"Da Vinci"	59	Architecte
2020	"Culiacan" (feat. Mister You)	67	Architecte
2020	"Pleine lune"	71	Architecte
2020	"Soirées des cités"	73	Architecte
2020	"En +"	75	Architecte
2020	"Laisse tomber"	76	Architecte
2020	"Tommy Shelby"	77	Architecte
2020	"En avance"	79	Architecte
2020	"F.L.P" (feat. Alonzo)	85	Architecte
2020	"Du passé au futur"	93	Architecte
2020	"Berline"	121	Architecte
2020	"J'ai pris la route"	134	Architecte
2021	"L'impasse"	97	Vrai 2 vrai
2021	"Jeune d'en bas" (feat. Nekfeu)	21	Vrai 2 vrai
2021	"27" (feat. Freeze Corleone)	28	Vrai 2 vrai
2021	"Du nord au sud" (feat. Soso Maness & ZKR)	64	Vrai 2 vrai
2021	"Génération 90"	85	Vrai 2 vrai
2021	"Costa Rica" (feat. Heuss l'Enfoiré)	113	Vrai 2 vrai
2021	"La vie de Bobby"	115	Vrai 2 vrai
2021	"Moi-même"	128	Vrai 2 vrai
2021	"Tellement"	129	Vrai 2 vrai
2021	"Le dehors"	130	Vrai 2 vrai
2021	"Ça tombe bien"	134	Vrai 2 vrai
2021	"Ils l'ont pas"	139	Vrai 2 vrai
2021	"La calle"	141	Vrai 2 vrai
2021	"Yes"	151	Vrai 2 vrai
2021	"Carabine" (feat. MHD)	160	Vrai 2 vrai
2021	"Fuck Love"	169	Vrai 2 vrai
2021	"Danse lugubre"	179	Vrai 2 vrai
