= Enfoiré =

Enfoiré or Enfoirés (meaning tosser(s) or bastard(s) ) may refer to:

- Heuss l'Enfoiré (born 1992), French rapper of Algerian descent
- Les Enfoirés, the singers and performers in the yearly French charity concert founded in 1986, with first concert held in 1989
