= 93 Empire =

Compilation album by Various Artists
- Released: 5 October 2018
- Recorded: 2017–2018
- Genre: Rap, French hip hop
- Length: 1:17:00
- Label: Capitol Music, Affranchis Music
- Producer: Diias, Zeg P, Nock-Pi & Yasser Beats

#93 Empire is a French hip hop compilation joining some 40 hip hop artists mostly from Seine-Saint-Denis, released on 5 October 2018. French rapper Sofiane wrote the lead single from the album and who launched the project. The album sold 130,000 copies and was certified platinum. Three tracks, "Woah", "Sur le drapeau" and "Empire" were released as main singles from the album in 2018, although 18 of the album's 22 total tracks charted in the French SNEP Top 200 on the basis of downloads of individual tracks.

== Tracklist ==
(Peak positions in SNEP French singles charts)

1. "Empire" (Sofiane & Kaaris) (3:12, peak #8)
2. "Woah" (Sofiane feat. Vald, Mac Tyer, Soolking, Kalash Criminel, Sadek & Heuss L'Enfoiré (4:06, peak #7)
3. "Nouvelle monnaie" (Landy, Kaaris & Sofiane) (3:17, peak #34)
4. "Iencli" (Vald & Sofiane) (3:42, peak #11)
5. "Crépuscule des empires" (Alpha 5.20 & Sofiane) (3:41, peak #88)
6. "Apollonia" (Dadju & Sofiane) (3:48, peak #48)
7. "Maman veut pas" (Q.E Favelas, Sadek & GLK) (3:57, peak #52)
8. "Pas le choix" (Lartiste, Sofiane & Kaaris) (3:03, peak #90)
9. "La maille" (Rémy, Hornet La Frappe & Kalash Criminel) (3:23, peak #83)
10. "Drive By" (Sadek, Dinos & Ixzo) (4:19, #103)
11. "Jusqu'ici tout va bien" (Vegedream & Sofiane) (2:40, peak #114)
12. "Rafaler" (Kaaris, 4Keus Gang, Q.E Favelas & Mac Kregor) (4:16, #131)
13. "Sur le drapeau" (Suprême NTM & Sofiane) (3:19, peak #4)
14. "Dinero" (Lartiste, Da Uzi & Don Milli) (3:18, peak #143)
15. "93 Coast" (Hornet La Frappe & Sofiane) (2:26, peak #94)
16. "Jay-Z" (Busta Flex, Shone, Sofiane & Nakk Mendosa) (3:09, peak #179)
17. "Viens dans mon 93" (Dinos, Hornet La Frappe & Sofiane) (3:23, peak #159)
18. "Tout le monde sait" (Kalash Criminel, GS CLAN, Brvbus & Kosi) (2:40 – Did not chart)
19. "Dans le bat" (Dabs & Sofiane) (3:08, peak 149)
20. "El mero mero" (Sifax, Bakyl, Worms-T & Sofiane) (3:25 – Did not chart)
21. "Vif" (Mayo, Sofiane & Solo Le Mythe) (3:29 – Did not chart)
22. "93 Empire (Remix)" (Boozoo Bakhaw, Goulag, Mansly, Benzo, Sofiane & Kalash Criminel) (5:37 – Did not chart)

== Music videos ==
- "Woah" – Sofiane, Vald, Mac Tyer, Soolking, Sadek, Heuss l'Enfoiré & Kalash Criminel) released on 3 August 2018
- "Sur le drapeau" – Suprême NTM & Sofiane released 26 September 2018
- "Empire" – Sofiane & Kaaris released on 5 October 2018
- "Maman veut pas" – Q.E Favelas, Sadek & GLK released on 23 November 2018
- "Iencli" – Vald & Sofiane released on 7 December 2018

== Charts ==
=== Weekly charts ===
Chart (2018)	Peak position
Belgian Albums (Ultratop Wallonia)	10
French Albums (SNEP)	2
Swiss Albums (Schweizer Hitparade)	39

=== Year-end charts ===
Chart (2018)	Position
Belgian Albums (Ultratop Wallonia)	157
French Albums (SNEP)	56

Chart (2019)	Position
French Albums (SNEP)	103
