= YL (rapper) =

French rapper (born 1996)

Jawad (born on April 6, 1996), better known by his stage name YL or Yamine l'Artyste, is a French rapper of Algerian descent who gained fame with his freestyle during All Stars events in Marseille. His release Traficante was used in the soundtrack of the film Chouf released in October 2016. He has collaborated with a great number of rappers. One of his notable and most popular songs “Nina” has had many fans confused as to the meaning of the song.

== Discography ==
Title	Details	Peak position			Certifications
Title	Details	FRA	BEL (WA)	SWI	Certifications
Confidences	Released: 23 February 2018; Label: Def Jam, Jive, Small Stone; Formats: CD, streaming	2	24	90	
Nyx & Érèbe / Æther & Héméra	Released: 3 February 2019; Label: Def Jam, Jive-Epic; Formats: CD, streaming	11	28	69	
Vaillants	Released: 16 April 2020; Label: Blue Hills; Formats: Digital download, streaming	17	36	—	
Compte de faits	Released: 18 September 2020; Label: Blue Hills; Formats: CD, streaming	10	32	85	
Yamine	Released: 25 February 2022; Label: Blue Hills; Formats: Digital download, streaming	—	83	—	

=== Singles ===
Year	Title	Peak positions	Album
Year	Title	FRA	Album
2018	"Pas pareil" (feat. Timal)	113	Nyx & Érèbe
2019	"Regarde moi"	126	Nyx & Érèbe
2019	"Mala" (feat. RK)	83	Aether & Héméra

=== Other charted songs ===
Year	Title	Peak positions		Album
Year	Title	FRA	BEL (WA)	Album
2018	"Fruit d'mon époque"	75	—	Confidences
2018	"Vai nova" (feat. Soolking)	38	—	Confidences
2018	"La hagra" (feat. Sofiane & Niro)	45	—	Confidences
2018	"Sicario" (feat. Ninho)	25	31 (Ultratip*)	Confidences
2018	"Donne-nous le" (feat. Alonzo)	71	—	Confidences
2018	"Oublie-moi"	87	—	Confidences
2018	"Elle me ment"	93	—	Confidences
2018	"Favelas"	102	—	Confidences
2018	"Ciel"	118	—	Confidences
2018	"Escort"	119	—	Confidences
2018	"Zanotti"	120	—	Confidences
2018	"Métaux"	143	—	Confidences
2018	"Yamine"	154	—	Confidences
2018	"Ahmed Othman"	159	—	Confidences
2018	"Mon barrio"	168	—	Confidences
2018	"La cause de mon père"	184	—	Confidences
2019	"Nina"	21	—	Nyx & Érèbe
2019	"Regarde moi"	90	—	Nyx & Érèbe
2019	"On fait l'mal" (feat. Niro)	103	—	Nyx & Érèbe
2019	"3min6"	115	—	Nyx & Érèbe
2019	"Tôt ou tard"	163	—	Nyx & Érèbe
2019	"Bénéfices"	191	—	Nyx & Érèbe
2019	"Pas pareil" (feat. Timal)	196	—	Nyx & Érèbe
2020	"Vaillante"	19	—	

*Did not appear in the official Belgian Ultratop 50 charts, but rather in the bubbling under Ultratip charts.

=== Featured in ===
Year	Title	Peak positions	Album
Year	Title	FRA	Album
2017	"Le cercle" (Sofiane feat. Hornet La Frappe, GLK & YL)	46	Sofiane album Bandit saleté
2017	"Pochon bleu" (Naps feat. 13ème Art, Graya, Kalif, Raisse & YL)	91	
2018	"Immigri" (Rim'K feat. YL)	165	Rim'k album Mutant
