= Andale (song) =

Single by Sadek

from the album Nique le casino
- Released: October 16, 2016
- Recorded: 2016
- Genre: Trap-pop
- Length: 3:18
- Label: Rec 118, Warner Music France
- Songwriter(s): Sadek Bourghuiba; Wanani Gradi Mariadi
- Producer(s): Hammadoun Sidibé

Sadek singles chronology
"La presse" (2016)	"Andale" (2016)	"La bise" (2016)

Gradur singles chronology
"Cala boca" (2016)	"Andale" (2016)	"Tous ce qu'il faut" (2016)

Music video
- Andale on YouTube

"Andale" is a song by French rapper Sadek featuring Gradur, released on November 23, 2018, as him, Nique le casino mixtape single.

== Writing and composition ==
"Andale" is a trap-pop song with hip-hop influences written in the key of B♭m major with a moderate tempo of 102 beats per minute.

== Music video ==
As of December 2022, the music video for Andale had over 53 million views on YouTube.

== Charts ==
Chart (2016)	Peak position
Belgium (Ultratip Bubbling Under Wallonia)	39
France (SNEP)	23

== Certifications ==
Region	Certification	Certified units/sales
France (SNEP)	Diamond	233,333^{‡}
^{‡} Sales+streaming figures based on certification alone.
