= Landy (rapper) =

- Born: Dylan Gahoussou Sylla; 14 February 1996 (age 30); Paris, France
- Genres: Hip hop, Trap, Pop rap
- Occupation: Rapper
- Years active: 2016–present
- Label: Universal Music France

Landy, pseudonym of Dylan Gahoussou Sylla (born 14 February 1996 in Paris), is a French rapper of Ivorian and Congolese origins.

== Biography ==
Dylan Gahoussou Sylla was born in Paris, to a mother of Ivorian descent and a Congolese father. At the age of six he moved to Joliot-Curie, in the municipality of Saint-Denis. In 2013 he committed some thefts, which led him to serve his sentence in prison in 2014.

== Career ==
Landy released his first single, Vaisseau mère, on November 21, 2017. In the following months, several singles and freestyles were released, allowing him to gain visibility. On March 8, 2019, he released his first studio album, Assa baing, including collaborations with Dadju, Heuss l'Enfoiré, Jul, Naza and Marwa Loud.

His second album, A-One, was made available on December 18, 2020. The album, whose title referred to the A1 autoroute, consisted of 17 tracks like the previous one, and featured artists such as Koba LaD, Soolking, Ninho and Niska. In 2021 and 2022 his releases became sporadic, with only a few singles and some featurings.

In December 2022 he released Vie d'avant, the first title from his third album. The project, entitled Brave, was released on February 14, 2023, and was characterized by the features of Gazo, SDM, Leto, Rsko and Ronisia.

=== Musical style ===
Landy said he considers himself both a rapper and a singer, drawing inspiration from Ivorian music such as zouglou and coupé-decalé. He stated that he listens to different types of music, such as Afro, Congolese, Ivorian and Nigerian music, as well as US hip hop and R&B. A recurring topic in Landy's lyrics is love.

== Discography ==
=== Studio albums ===
- Assa baing (2019)
- A-One (2020)
- Brave (2023)
