= L'homme au bob =

Studio album by Gradur
- Released: 23 February 2015
- Recorded: 2014–2015
- Genre: French rap
- Label: Barclay Records

Gradur chronology
ShegueyVara (2014)	L'homme au bob (2015)	ShegueyVara Vol. 2

Singles from L'homme au bob
- 1. "Terrasser" Released: 2014; 2. "Jamais" Released: 2014; 3. "Priez pour moi" Released: 2015; 4. "Stringer Bell" Released: 2015

L'homme au bob (literally The men with bucket hat) is the first studio album of Gradur, a French rapper of Congolese descent.

== Track list ==
1. "Calibré" (2:51)
2. "Terrasser" (3:41)
3. "J'donne ça" (feat. Alonzo) (4:39)
4. "Jamais" (3:07)
5. "Militarizé" (feat. Niro) (4:30)
6. "Bloody Murder" (4:12)
7. "R.D.C." (3:07)
8. "Priez Pour Moi" (3:36)
9. "Bang Bang" (feat. Chief Keef) (3:45)
10. "Stringer Bell" (4:22)
11. "Verre de Sky" (3:54)
12. "La Douille" (feat. Lacrim) (4:54)
13. "Beef" (5:09)
14. "Makak" (3:56)
15. "#Lhommeaubob" (feat. Migos) (4:24)
16. "Secteur" (feat. Kayna Samet) (3:57)
17. "Confessions" (5:04)

== Charts ==
=== Weekly charts ===
Chart (2015)	Peak position
Belgian Albums (Ultratop Flanders)	54
Belgian Albums (Ultratop Wallonia)	2
French Albums (SNEP)	1
Swiss Albums (Schweizer Hitparade)	12

=== Year-end charts ===
Chart (2015)	Position
Belgian Albums (Ultratop Wallonia)	62
French Albums (SNEP)	40
