= Moulaga =

2019 single by Heuss l'Enfoiré feat. Jul

Single by Heuss l'Enfoiré featuring Jul
- Released: 13 December 2019
- Recorded: 2019
- Genre: Alternative hip hop; dance pop
- Length: 2:57
- Label: Midi Midi; 150 Productions
- Songwriters: Karim Djeriou; Jul; Zeg P; Wiils
- Producers: Zeg P; Wiils

Heuss l'Enfoiré singles chronology
"Ne reviens pas" (2019)	"Moulaga" (2019)	"Super Silver Maze" (2019)

Jul singles chronology
"Ibiza" (2019)	"Moulaga" (2019)	"Sousou" (2020)

Music video
- "Moulaga" on YouTube

"Moulaga" (pronounced [mulaɡa]) is a song by French-Algerian rapper Heuss l'Enfoiré featuring vocals from French rapper Jul. It was released on 13 December 2019 and peaked at number 2 in France.

== Charts ==
Chart performance for "Moulaga"
Chart (2019–2023)	Peak position
Austria (Ö3 Austria Top 40)	49
Belgium (Ultratip Bubbling Under Flanders)	14
Belgium (Ultratop 50 Wallonia)	13
Czech Republic Singles Digital (ČNS IFPI)	26
France (SNEP)	2
Germany (GfK)	46
Netherlands (Single Tip)	16
Poland (Polish Streaming Top 100)	52
Slovakia Singles Digital (ČNS IFPI)	69
Switzerland (Schweizer Hitparade)	42

== Certifications ==
Region	Certification	Certified units/sales
France (SNEP)	Diamond	333,333^{‡}
^{‡} Sales+streaming figures based on certification alone.
