= Gradur =

French rapper (born 1990)

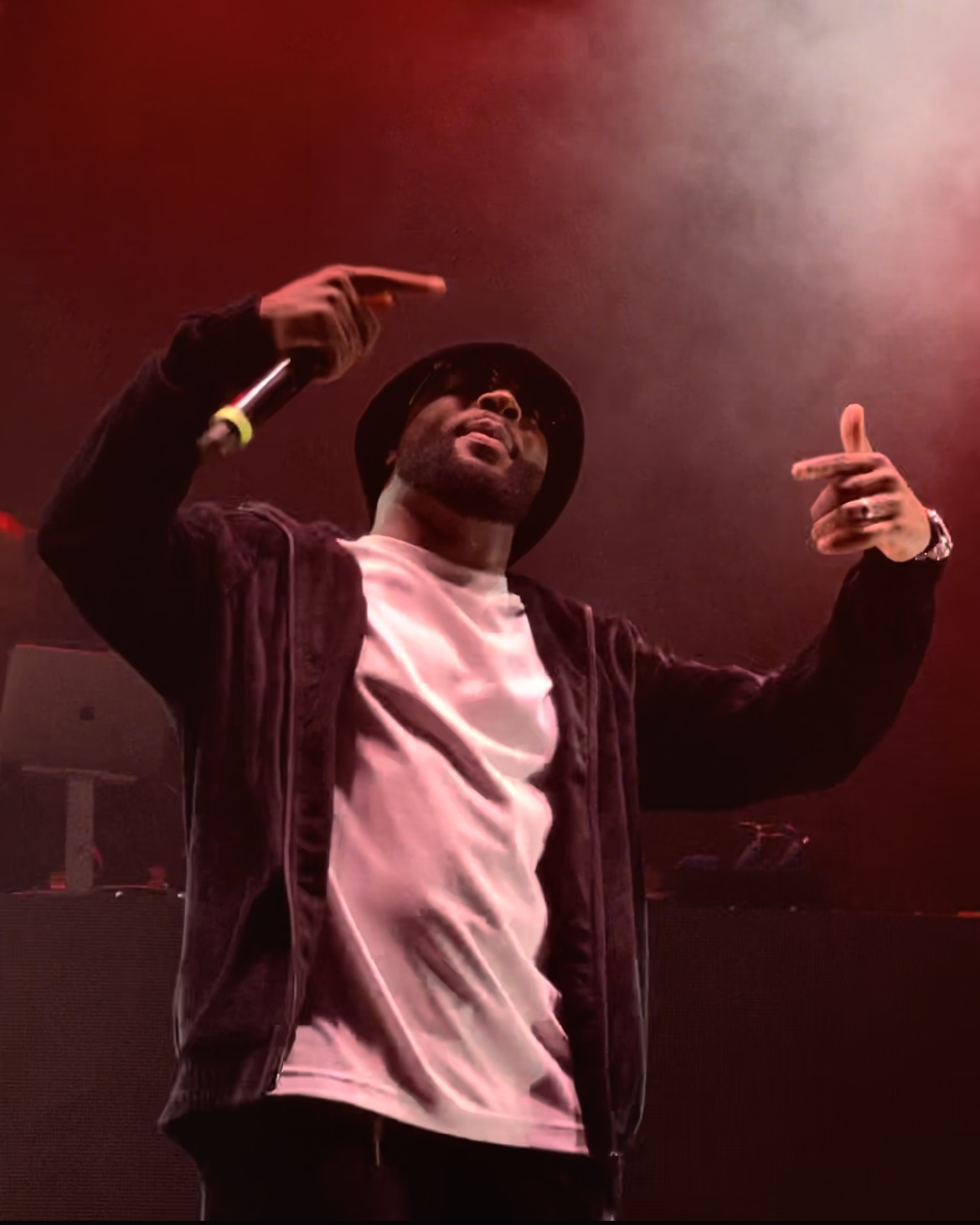
- Gradur at Fluo Openair in Switzerland in 2023

Background information
- Also known as: Grady
- Born: Wanani Gradi Mariadi; 28 November 1990 (age 35)
- Origin: Roubaix, Hauts-de-France, France
- Genres: French hip hop; trap
- Occupation: Rapper
- Years active: 2013–present
- Label: Millenium Barclay

Wanani Gradi Mariadi (born 28 November 1990), better known by his stage name Gradur (French pronunciation: [ɡʁadyʁ]), is a French rapper of Congolese origin from Roubaix, Hauts-de-France. He first gained recognition from a series of freestyles called Sheguey.

== Career ==
He started as part of the rap band 59. Enjoying great following online, he formed his own entourage dubbed Sheguey Squad sheguey meaning "child of the street" in Congolese lingo and released his mixtape ShegueyVara in 2014 with the music video "Traction". His greatly expected debut album L'homme au Bob was released on 23 February 2015 with collaborations from Niro, Lacrim, Alonzo (from Psy4 de la Rime), Kayna Samet, Chief Keef and Migos.

== Discography ==
=== Albums ===
Year	Album	Peak positions				Units
Year	Album	FRA	BEL (Fl)	BEL (Wa)	SWI	Units
2015	L'homme au bob	1	54	2	12	
2016	Where Is l'album de Gradur	3	—	18	27	
2019	Zone 59	5	153	20	35	FRA: 29,565
2026	Décennie	2	—	14	35	

=== Mixtapes ===
Year	Album	Peak positions		
Year	Album	FRA	BEL (Wa)	SWI
2014	ShegueyVara	—	—	—
2015	ShegueyVara Vol. 2	7	10	24

=== Singles ===
Year	Single	Peak positions				Album / Mixtape
Year	Single	FRA	BEL (Fl)	BEL (Wa)	SWI	Album / Mixtape
2014	"Terrasser"	27	—	—	—	L'homme au bob
2014	"Jamais"	40	—	—	—	L'homme au bob
2015	"Rosa"	19	—	15* (Ultratip)	—	ShegueyVara Vol. 2
2015	"Je m'en vais"	69	—	—	—	ShegueyVara Vol. 2
2016	"Bigo"	48	—	—	—	Where Is l'album
2016	"Dans ma vie"	45	—	—	—	Where Is l'album
2019	"Voyou"	94	—	—	—	Non-album single
2019	"Rari"	6	—	—	78	Zone 59
2019	"Ne reviens pas" (featuring Heuss l'Enfoiré)	1	6* (Ultratip)	2	21	Zone 59
2021	"Trucs de choses" (with Franglish)	22	—	—	—	Non-album single
2023	"Mon BB" (with Hamza)	14	—	—	—	Non-album single
2024	"Ti Ti Ti" (with SDM and RSKO)	18	—	—	—	

*Did not appear in the official Belgian Ultratop 50 charts, but rather in the bubbling under Ultratip charts.

Featured in

Year	Single	Peak positions		Album
Year	Single	FRA	BEL (Wa)	Album
2014	"Le coup du patron" (Dosseh, Gradur & Joke)	10	35* (Ultratip)	Perestroïka
2015	"Brinks" (Alonzo feat. Gradur)	90	—	Règlement de comptes
2015	"Voyous" (Lacrim feat. Gradur)	89	—	Lacrim mixtape Ripro Vol.1
2015	"Chintawaz" (Seth Gueko feat. Gradur)	82	—	Seth Gueko album Professeur Punchline
2015	"Wesh (#TuMeDisDesWesh)" (Mokobé feat. Gradur)	8	—	TBA
2016	"Aime moi demain" (The Shin Sekaï feat. Gradur)	46	28* (Ultratip)	The Shin Sekaï album Indéfini
2016	"Coller serrer" (DJ Kayz feat. Gradur)	17	—	TBA
2016	"Super héros" (Aya Nakamura feat. Gradur)	34	—	TBA
2016	"Cala boca" (Niska feat. Gradur)	136	—	Niska album Zifukoro
2016	"Andale" (Sadek feat. Gradur)	23	39* (Ultratip)	Sadek album Nique le casino
2018	"47AK" (Kalash Criminel feat. Gradur)	47	—	Kalash Criminel album La fosse aux lions

*Did not appear in the official Belgian Ultratop 50 charts, but rather in the bubbling under Ultratip charts.

=== Other songs ===
Year	Single	Peak positions	Album / Mixtape
Year	Single	FRA	Album / Mixtape
2015	"Priez pour moi"	81	L'homme au bob
2015	"La douille" (feat. Lacrim)	85	L'homme au bob
2015	"Militarizé" (feat. Niro)	99	L'homme au bob
2015	"#lhommeaubob" (feat. Migos)	103	L'homme au bob
2015	"Calibré"	122	L'homme au bob
2015	"J'donne ça" (feat. Alonzo)	134	L'homme au bob
2015	"Tu crois que je mens"	125	ShegueyVara Vol. 2
2015	"Los Santos"	187	ShegueyVara Vol. 2
2015	"Philly" (featuring Niska)	138	ShegueyVara Vol. 2
2015	"D'or et de platine" (featuring Jul)	16	ShegueyVara Vol. 2
2016	"Illegal" (featuring Black M)	134	ShegueyVara Vol. 2
2016	"Oblah"	19	Where Is l'album
2016	"Encore"	93	Where Is l'album
2016	"Ken"	142	Where Is l'album
2016	"Maman"	165	Where Is l'album
2016	"Cherche la monnaie"	142	Where Is l'album
2016	"Never Change"	181	Where Is l'album
2018	"Sheguey 12"	13	
2019	"Voyou"	94	
2019	"Sheguey 13"	181	Zone 59
2019	"BLH" (feat. Ninho)	50	Zone 59
2019	"Méchant Sheguey" (feat. Niska)	85	Zone 59
2019	"Zone 59"	113	Zone 59
2019	"Ma petite" (feat. Naza)	129	Zone 59
2019	"The Wire" (feat. Koba LaD)	176	Zone 59
2020	"Pas assez"	95	
