= Sousou (song) =

Single by Jul

from the album La machine
- Released: 26 March 2020
- Genre: French rap; R&B
- Length: 3:58
- Label: D'or et de platine
- Songwriter: Julien Maris
- Producer: Jul

Jul singles chronology
"Moulaga" (2019)	"Sousou" (2020)	"De l'or" (2020)

Music video
- "Sousou" on YouTube

"Sousou" is a song by French rapper Jul released on 26 March 2020, alongside a music video. It peaked at number three in the French SNEP Singles.

== Charts ==
Chart (2020)	Peak position
Belgium (Ultratip Bubbling Under Wallonia)	12
France (SNEP)	3

== Certifications ==
Region	Certification	Certified units/sales
France (SNEP)	Platinum	200,000^{‡}
^{‡} Sales+streaming figures based on certification alone.
