= Khapta =

2019 single by Heuss l'Enfoiré featuring Sofiane

Single by Heuss l'Enfoiré featuring Sofiane

from the album En esprit
- Released: 8 March 2019
- Length: 2:43
- Label: Midi Midi, 150 Productions
- Songwriters: Karim Djeriou; Sofiane
- Producer: Heuss l'Enfoiré

Heuss l'Enfoiré featuring Sofiane singles chronology
| "Les méchants" (2018) | "Khapta" (2019) | "BX Land 4" (2019) |

Music video
- "Khapta" on YouTube

"Khapta" (Arabic: خبطة, ḵabṭa) is a song by French-Algerian rapper Heuss l'Enfoiré featuring vocals from French rapper Sofiane. It was released on 8 March 2019 and topped the French SNEP chart.

== Charts ==
Chart performance for "Khapta"
| Chart (2019) | Peak position |
|---|---|
| Belgium (Ultratop 50 Wallonia) | 16 |
| France (SNEP) | 1 |

== Certifications ==
| Region | Certification | Certified units/sales |
|---|---|---|
| France (SNEP) | Diamond | 333,333^{‡} |
^{‡} Sales+streaming figures based on certification alone.
