= Street Flow =

French drama film

- Film poster
- Directed by: Leïla Sy; Kery James
- Written by: Kery James
- Produced by: Toufik Ayadi
- Starring: Jammeh Diangana; Bakary Diombera; Kery James
- Production companies: Srab Films; Les Films Velvet; L’Insensé Films
- Distributed by: Netflix
- Release date: October 12, 2019
- Running time: 96 minutes
- Country: France
- Language: French

Street Flow (French: Banlieusards) is a French drama film directed by Leïla Sy and Kery James and written by Kery James. The plot revolves around fifteen-year-old Noumouké from the suburb of Paris who is about to decide which brother's foot steps to follow - the lawyer student Soulaymaan or the gangster Demba.

The film was released on October 12, 2019 on Netflix.

== Cast ==
- Jammeh Diangana
- Bakary Diombera
- Kery James
- Dali Benssalah
- Cherine Ghemri
- Chloé Jouannet
- Pierre Rousselet

== Release ==
Street Flow was released on October 12, 2019 on Netflix. According to Netflix, over 2.6 million accounts watched Street Flow within the first week of release.

== Music ==
Kery James records three previously unreleased tracks for the film. The first is À qui la faute? in collaboration with Orelsan. The second is a duet with Youssoupha, Les Yeux mouillés, also directed by Leïla Sy. The third is Tuer un homme with Lacrim.

Unreleased songs also feature in the film, including Lettre à la République by Kery James, After Laughter (Comes Tears) by Wendy Rene, Little Ghetto Boy by Donny Hathaway, etc.
