= Kaza (rapper) =

French musician

Anthony Kazadi, better known as Kaza, is a French rapper from Fontenay-sous-Bois, Île-de-France.

== Career ==
Starting in a career in basketball, he moved to rapping with the 2018 series HRTBRK with notable chart success from his starts. He was signed to Elektra France and was close to Gambi and said he was greatly influenced by group XV Barbar. His freestyles series led to a first studio album Heartbreak Life on 6 March 2020, reaching the Top 10 in the French Albums Chart, followed by a deluxe edition on 23 October 2020 titled Heartbreak Life: Winter Edition. His second album T*X*C dropped on 30 April 2021. His third album Titled Heartbreak Life 2 was released in on 12 January 2024.

== Discography ==
=== Albums ===
Year	Title	Peak positions			Certification
Year	Title	FRA	BEL (Wa)	SWI	Certification
2020	Heartbreak Life	9	20	26	
2021	Toxic	5	21	20	
2024	Heartbreak Life II	7	64	—	

=== Singles ===
Year	Title	Peak positions		Album
Year	Title	FRA	BEL (Wa)	Album
2019	"Pour un jeu" (feat. Leto)	27	–	-
2019	"Combien"	64	–	HEARTBREAK LIFE
2020	"3-5-7"	52	–	HEARTBREAK LIFE
2020	"Dans tes yeux"	44	39 (Ultratip*)	HEARTBREAK LIFE
2020	"Pare-balles"	40	–	HEARTBREAK LIFE
2021	"Certifié toxic"	64	–	TOXIC
2021	"Bandida"	104	–	TOXIC
2021	"Elle avait les mots"	93	–	-
2022	"Sincère"	97	–	TOXIC
2023	"HRTBRK #6"	14	–	-
2023	"Douleur"	183	–	-
2023	"Luva"	138	–	HEARTBREAK LIFE II
2023	"HRTBRK #7"	63	–	HEARTBREAK LIFE II

=== Other songs ===
Year	Title	Peak positions	Album
Year	Title	FRA	Album
2019	"HRTBRK #2"	70	HEARTBREAK LIFE
2019	"HRTBRK #3"	53	-
2020	"HRTBRK #4"	70	HEARTBREAK LIFE
2020	"Béni" (feat. Maes)	53	HEARTBREAK LIFE
2020	"La vie de rêve" (feat. Timal)	86	HEARTBREAK LIFE
2020	"Idiot"	109	HEARTBREAK LIFE
2020	"Copa"	156	HEARTBREAK LIFE
2020	"Rolling Stone"	157	HEARTBREAK LIFE
2020	"Lafayette"	166	HEARTBREAK LIFE
2020	"Calibré"	174	HEARTBREAK LIFE
2020	"La Bibi"	197	HEARTBREAK LIFE
2020	"J'aimerais tellement"	43	HEARTBREAK LIFE
2020	"Bebecita"	137	HEARTBREAK LIFE
2021	"N26" (feat. Maes)	91	TOXIC
2021	"Number" (feat. Dinos)	105	TOXIC
2021	"HRTBRK #5"	114	TOXIC
2021	"100 Carats"	143	TOXIC
2021	"Elle veut" (feat. Sasso)	21	Enfant de la Rue Vol.2 (Sasso)
2024	"CALMANT" (feat. Naza)	124	HERATBREAK LIFE II
2024	"DOUBLE JEU" (feat. Franglish)	160	HERATBREAK LIFE II
