= Mac Tyer =

French rapper

Socrate Petnga (born 23 April 1979), better known as Mac Tyer (/ˈtaɪər/), is a French rapper of Cameroonian descent, from Aubervilliers, Île-de-France. He is also known as Monsieur Socrate or mononym Socrate.

He was also member of Perestroika, a hip hop trio made up of Mac Tyer, Mac Kregor (real name Makenzy Guerrier), also from Aubervilliers, France but of Haitian descent and Dontcha. The band was formed in 1999, and active initially for one year, with very rare appearances later on.

With Dontcha opting to continue on a solo career, Mac Tyer and Mac Kregor turned it into a rap duo renaming it Tandem in 2000. Tandem remained active until 2014, although its members also released solo albums of their own. Tandem was signed at various times to Because Music, Première Classe and Hostile Records.

== Discography ==
=== Albums ===
as part of duo Tandem

- 2005: C'est toujours pour ceux qui savent

Solo

Year	Album	Peak positions	
Year	Album	FR	BEL (Wa)
2006	Le général (credited to Socrate AKA Mac Tyer)	28	—
2008	D'où je viens	28	—
2010	Hat-Trick	28	—
2012	Untouchable	66	—
2013	Banger #1	66	—
2014	Banger II	54	—
2015	Je suis une légende	6	76
2017	Banger 3	12	—
2018	C'est la street mon pote	55	—
2020	Noir	33	—
2021	Noir. II	133	—
2021	Noir. III	57	—

=== Mixtapes / EPs ===
as part of duo Tandem

- 2001: Ceux qui savent m'ecoutent (EP)
- 2004: Tandematique Modéle Vol. 1 (Mixtape)
- 2005: La Trilogie (Maxi)

Solo

- 2005: Patrimoine du ghetto (produced by Jo Le Balafré)

=== Singles ===
Solo

Year	Single	Peak positions	Album
Year	Single	FR	Album
2014	"Laisse-moi te dire" (feat. Maître Gims)	37	
2015	"Un jour peut-être"	92	Je suis une légende
2015	"Je suis une légende"	190	Je suis une légende
2015	"Fantômes" (Mac Tyer / Blacko)	153	
2020	"Moto" (feat. Ninho)	7	Noir

Featured in

Year	Single	Peak positions	Album
Year	Single	FR	Album
2013	"On s'en bat les couilles 2013" (La Fouine feat. Mac Tyer)	183	La Fouine album Drôle de parcours
2017	"Comme à l'ancienne" (Rémy feat. Mac Tyer)	176	Rémy album C'est Rémy
2018	"Woah" (Sofiane feat. Vald, Mac Tyer, Soolking, Kalash Criminel, Sadek & Heuss L'Enfoiré)	5	93 Empire (by Various Artists)
2019	"Briganté" (Kaaris feat. Mac Tyer & Sofiane)	33	Kaaris album Or Noir Part 3

=== Other releases and charted songs ===
Solo

Year	Single	Peak positions	Album
Year	Single	FR	Album
2018	"Il se passe quoi" (feat. Kaaris & Sofiane)	107	C'est la street mon pote
2021	"Grammy" (feat. Freeze Corleone)	84	Noir 3
