= Sofiane (rapper) =

French rapper (born 1986)

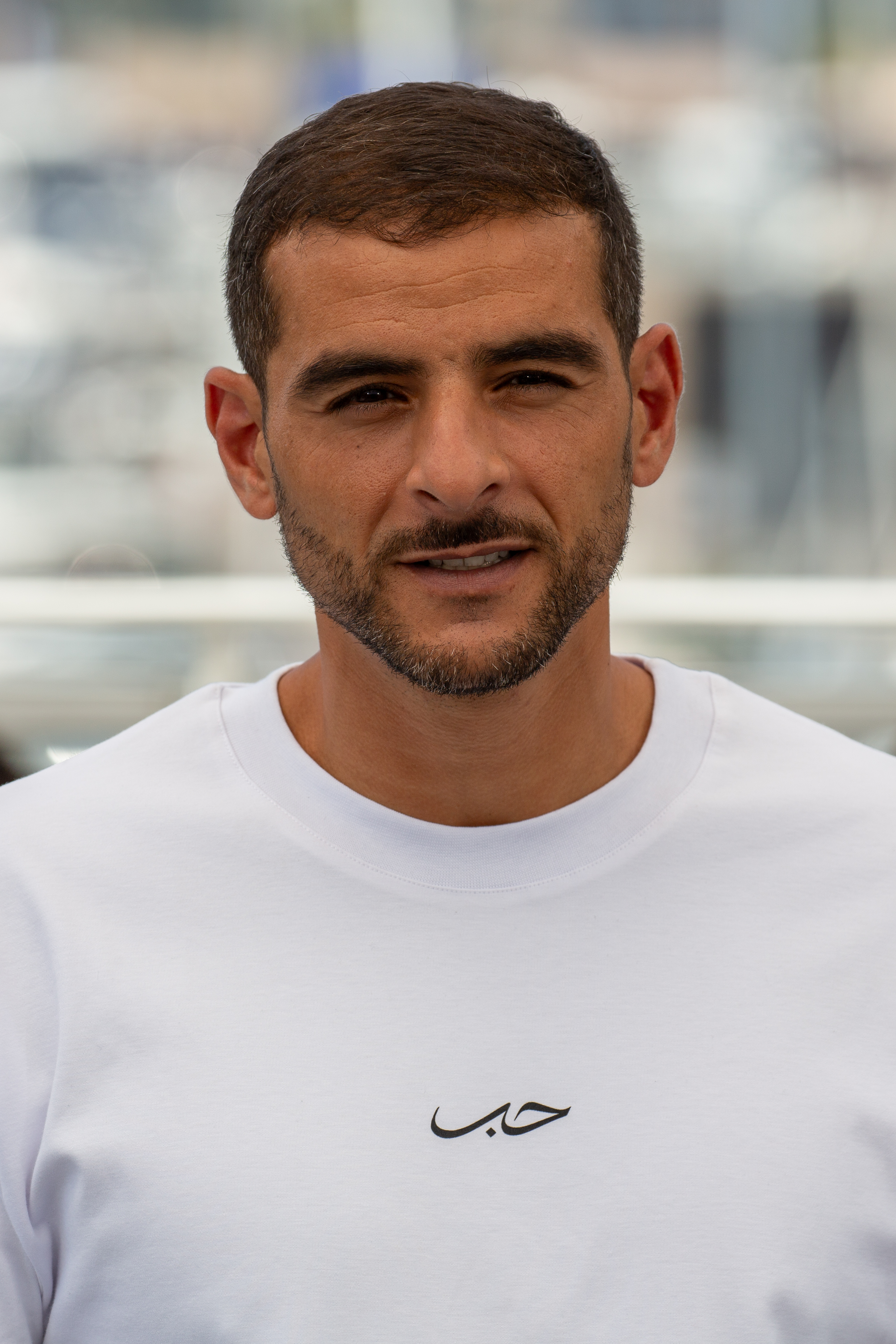

Background information
- Also known as: Fianso, So
- Born: Sofiane Zermani; 21 July 1986 (age 40); Saint-Denis, Île-de-France, France
- Origin: Le Blanc-Mesnil, France, Algérien
- Genres: French rap, trap, gangsta rap
- Occupation: Rapper
- Years active: 2004–present
- Labels: Suther Kane, Millenium, Capitol, Universal

Sofiane Zermani (French pronunciation: [sɔfjan zɛʁmani], Arabic: سفيان زرماني; born 21 July 1986) is a French rapper. He is also known as Fianso (pronounced [fjanso]; verlan of his first name). Born in Saint-Denis, Paris Region, he lived in the nearby Stains until age 13 when he moved to Le Blanc-Mesnil.

In 2011, Sofiane released independently the album Blacklist followed by Blacklist II in 2013. In 2016, he launched a series of videos titled #JeSuisPasséChezSo inviting other less-known rappers to take part. In November 2016, he was signed to Capitol Records, an affiliate of Universal Music France. In January 2017, he released "Ma cité a craqué" featuring Bakyl. The album #JeSuisPasséChezSo, with same title as the earlier series, peaked at #2 on SNEP, the French Albums Chart. The album was certified Platinum in May 2017 for selling over 100,000 copies internationally.

In May 2017 Sofiane released the album Bandit saleté ("Filth bandit"), which again was certified platinum. For the music video for the song "Toka" from the album, Sofiane and around 10 of his crew stood in the middle of the A3 autoroute, blocking cars, while Sofiane rapped the song in front of cameras. The filming was done without a permit. In February 2018 he was fined €1,500 and given a suspended sentence of four months in jail for obstructing traffic. At the sentencing, Sofiane apologized for his actions, and said that the decision to film there had come to him in a moment of "bad inspiration".

== Discography ==
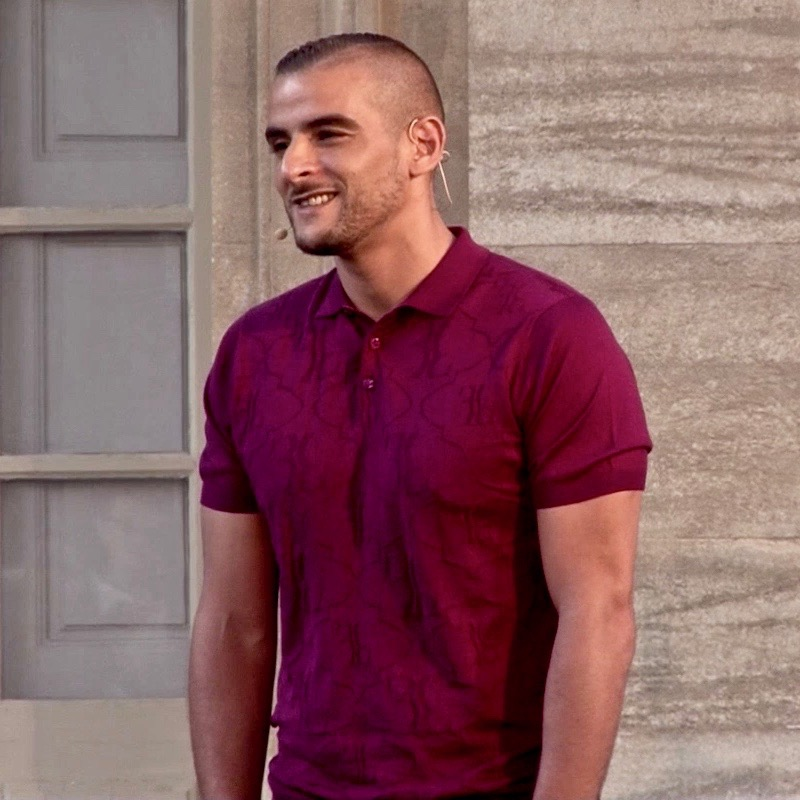
Sofiane (2018)

=== Albums ===
Album details	Charts			Certifications	Details
Album details	FRA	BEL Wa	SWI	Certifications	Details
Bandit saleté: Date released: 12 May 2017; Record label: Suther Kane, Capitol	1	15	13	SNEP: Platinum	
Affranchis: Date released: 26 January 2018; Record label: Suther Kane, Capitol	1	2	13	SNEP: Platinum	
La direction: Date released: 21 May 2021; Record label: Capitol	1	9	23		

=== Mixtapes and EPs ===
Album details	Charts			Certifications	Details
Album details	FRA	BEL Wa	SWI	Certifications	Details
Première claque: Date released: 2007; Record label:	—	—	—		
La vie de cauchemar: Date released: 2009; Record label:	—	—	—		
Blacklist: Date released: 2011; Record label: I Need Money	—	—	—		Track listing: Blacklist; 1. "Intro (Réveillez-vous)"; 2. "M.Fiansooo"; 3. "Normal natural"; 4. "En ouvrant les bras"; 5. "Quaterback"; 6. "Aide moi"; 7. "Elle était belle"; 8. "Mon jnoun"; 9. "I Need Money"; 10. "N'oublie jamais l'homme" feat. BR; 11. "Ghettoyouth" (Remix); 12. "Falestini"; 13. "Need Money Gang"; 14. "Des regrets" feat. Soumia; 15. "Aller retour"; 16. "Outro"
Blacklist II: Date released: 2013; Record label: I Need Money	79	—	—		Track listing: Blacklist II; 1. "Echec et mat"; 2. "So"; 3. "Une balle dans la tête"; 4. "Cio bonne vie" feat. Léa Castel; 5. "Lionne"; 6. "Yema" feat. Gregz & Trade Union; 7. "On veut du gen-art"; 8. "Tout ce que j'ai fait" feat. Mac Tyer; 9. "Love et haine"; 10. "Boxe avec les mots (Remix)" feat. Dosseh; 11. "Juste une larme" feat. Léa Castel; 12. "La rue parle" feat. Rohff; 13. "Un ami à nous"; 14. "#FTGNTM"; 15. "Toujours en Zga" feat. Blankok All-Star; 16. "Lettre à un jeune rappeur"
#JeSuisPasséChezSo (EP): Date released: 27 January 2017; Record label: Suther Kane, Capitol	2	12	39	SNEP: Platinum	Track listing: #JesuispasséchezSo; 1. "Un boulot sérieux"; 2. "93 Empire" feat. Kalash Criminel; 3. "Fais le mouv" feat. MHD; 4. "Rebeulotte"; 5. "Savastano"; 6. "Dis-moi où tu pécho" feat. YL & Timal; 7. "C'est nous les condés"; 8. "DZ Mafia"; 9. "Ça bicrave la mort"; 10. "X"; 11. "Ma cité a craqué" feat. Bakyl; 12. "Mortal Kombat" feat. Graya, Ninho, GLK, Riane & Le S; 13. "Bakhaw" feat. Boozoo; 14. "Tout l'monde s'en fout"

=== Collective albums ===
Album details	Charts			Details
Album details	FRA	BEL Wa	SWI	Details
93 Empire: Date released: 2018; Type: Collective album (project organized by Sofiane); Record label: Affranchis / Capitol	2	10	39	Track listing: #93 Empire; 1. "Empire" (Sofiane & Kaaris) (3:12); 2. "Woah" (Sofiane feat. Vald, Mac Tyer, Soolking, Kalash Criminel, Sadek & Heuss L'Enfoiré (4:06); 3. "Nouvelle monnaie" (Landy, Kaaris & Sofiane) (3:17); 4. "Iencli" (Vald & Sofiane) (3:42); 5. "Crépuscule des empires" (Alpha 5.20 & Sofiane) (3:41); 6. "Apollonia" (Dadju & Sofiane) (3:48); 7. "Maman veut pas" (Q.E Favelas, Sadek & GLK) (3:57); 8. "Pas le choix" (Lartiste, Sofiane & Kaaris) (3:03); 9. "La maille" (Rémy, Hornet La Frappe & Kalash Criminel) (3:23); 10. "Drive By" (Sadek, Dinos & Ixzo) (4:19); 11. "Jusqu'ici tout va bien" (Vegedream & Sofiane) (2:40); 12. "Rafaler" (Kaaris, 4Keus Gang, Q.E Favelas & Mac Kregor) (4:16); 13. "Sur le drapeau" (Suprême NTM & Sofiane) (3:19); 14. "Dinero" (Lartiste, Da Uzi & Don Milli) (3:18); 15. "93 Coast" (Hornet La Frappe & Sofiane) (2:26); 16. "Jay-Z" (Busta Flex, Shone, Sofiane & Nakk Mendosa) (3:09); 17. "Viens dans mon 93" (Dinos, Hornet La Frappe & Sofiane) (3:23); 18. "Tout le monde sait" (Kalash Criminel, GS CLAN, Brvbus & Kosi) (2:40); 19. "Dans le bat" (Dabs & Sofiane) (3:08); 20. "El mero mero" (Sifax, Bakyl, Worms-T & Sofiane) (3:25); 21. "Vif" (Mayo, Sofiane & Solo Le Mythe) (3:29); 22. "93 Empire (Remix)" (Boozoo Bakhaw, Goulag, Mansly, Benzo, Sofiane & Kalash Criminel) (5:37)

=== Singles ===
Year	Single	Charts			Certification	Album
Year	Single	FRA	BEL Wa	SWI	Certification	Album
2017	"Tout l'monde s'en fout"	3	7 (Ultratip*)	–	SNEP: Diamond	#JeSuisPasséChezSo
2017	"Bandit saleté"	115	–	–		Bandit saleté
2018	"Longue vie" (feat. Ninho & Hornet La Frappe)	2	45	–	SNEP: Platinum	Affranchis
2020	"#JeSuisPasséChezSo Ep 12"	43	–	–		Non-album singles
2020	"Remontada" (feat. Azet)	–	–	95		Non-album singles
2020	"American Airlines" (feat. SCH)	18	19 (Ultratip*)	–		Non-album singles
2020	"Nouveaux parrains" (feat. Soolking)	42	–	–		Non-album singles
2021	"#Attrape-moi si tu peux"	56	–	–		La direction

*Did not appear in the official Belgian Ultratop 50 charts, but rather in the bubbling under Ultratip charts.

=== Featured in ===
Year	Single	Charts			Certification	Album
Year	Single	FRA	BEL Wa	SWI	Certification	Album
2017	"Grand Paris" (Médine feat. Lartiste, Lino, Sofiane, Alivor, Seth Gueko, Ninho & Youssoupha)	64	–		SNEP: Gold	
2017	"Laisse pas traîner ton fils" (Ninho feat. Sofiane)	8	14 (Ultratip*)	–	SNEP: Gold	Ninho album Comme prévu
2017	"T'es un marrant" (Hornet La Frappe feat. Sofiane)	54	–	–		Hornet La Frappe album Nous-mêmes
2017	"Bling Bling" (Kaaris feat. Kalash Criminel & Sofiane)	9	3 (Ultratip*)	–	SNEP: Platinum	Kaaris album Dozo
2018	"Dragon" (Vald feat. Sofiane)	4	–	–	SNEP: Gold	Vald album Xeu
2018	"La hagra" (YL feat. Sofiane & Niro)	45	–	–		YL album Confidences
2018	"Loup Garou" (Maître Gims feat. Sofiane)	3	38	86	SNEP: Gold	Maître Gims album Ceinture noire
2018	"ALZ" (Caballero & JeanJass feat. Sofiane)	132	–	–		Caballero & JeanJass album Double hélice 3
2018	"Encore" (Sadek feat. Sofiane)	110	–	–		Sadek album Johnny de Janeiro
2018	"Woah" (Sofiane, Vald, Mac Tyer, Soolking, Kalash Criminel, Sadek & Heuss L'Enfoiré)	7	12 (Ultratip*)	–	SNEP: Gold	93 Empire (by Various Artists)
2018	"Sur le drapeau" (Suprême NTM & Sofiane)	4	–	–	SNEP: Platinum	93 Empire (by Various Artists)
2018	"Empire" (Sofiane & Kaaris)	8	–	–		93 Empire (by Various Artists)
2018	"Iencli" (Vald & Sofiane)	11	–	–		93 Empire (by Various Artists)
2018	"Nouvelle monnaie" (Landy, Kaaris & Sofiane)	34	–	–		93 Empire (by Various Artists)
2018	"Apollonia" (Dadju & Sofiane)	48	–	–		93 Empire (by Various Artists)
2018	"Crépuscule des empires" (Alpha 5.20 & Sofiane)	88	–	–		93 Empire (by Various Artists)
2018	"Pas le choix" (Lartiste, Sofiane & Kaaris)	90	–	–		93 Empire (by Various Artists)
2018	"93 Coast" (Hornet La Frappe & Sofiane)	94	–	–		93 Empire (by Various Artists)
2018	"Jusqu'ici tout va bien" (Vegedream & Sofiane)	114	–	–		93 Empire (by Various Artists)
2018	"Dans le bat" (Dabs & Sofiane)	149	–	–		93 Empire (by Various Artists)
2018	"Viens dans mon 93" (Dinos, Hornet La Frappe & Sofiane)	159	–	–		93 Empire (by Various Artists)
2018	"Jay-Z" (Busta Flex, Shone, Sofiane & Nakk Mendosa)	179	–	–		93 Empire (by Various Artists)
2018	"Fashion Week Rmx" (Tedua & Chris Nolan feat. Sofiane)	–	–	–		
2018	"Cosa nostra" (Soolking feat. Sofiane, Lacrim)	39	–	–		Soolking album Fruit du démon
2018	"Il se passe quoi" (Mac Tyer feat. Kaaris & Sofiane)	107	–	–		Mac Tyer album C'est la street mon pote
2019	"Briganté" (Kaaris feat. Mac Tyer & Sofiane)	33	–	–		Kaaris album Or Noir Part 3
2019	"Khapta" (Heuss l'Enfoiré feat. Sofiane)	7	–	–	SNEP: Platinum; BEA: Gold	Heuss l'Enfoiré album En esprit
2019	"C'est mon sang" (RK feat. Sofiane)	3	10 (Ultratip*)	99	SNEP: Gold	
2019	"Sur le banc" (Naps feat. Sofiane, Dika & Kalif)	172	–	–		
2020	"Mecs de cités" (Sifax feat. Sofiane)	38	–	–	SNEP: Gold	Sifax album La mentale

*Did not appear in the official Belgian Ultratop 50 charts, but rather in the bubbling under Ultratip charts.

=== Other charted songs ===
Year	Single	Charts		Certifications	Album
Year	Single	FRA	BEL Wa	Certifications	Album
2017	"X"	84		SNEP: Gold	#JeSuisPasséChezSo
2017	"Jesuispasséchezso: Episode 5" / "Police Nationale"	94		SNEP: Gold	#JeSuisPasséChezSo
2017	"Ma cité a craqué" (feat. Bakyl)	96			#JeSuisPasséChezSo
2017	"Un boulot sérieux"	110			#JeSuisPasséChezSo
2017	"93 Empire" (feat. Kalash Criminel)	121		SNEP: Gold	#JeSuisPasséChezSo
2017	"Fais le mouv"	186			#JeSuisPasséChezSo
2017	"DZ Mafia"	198			#JeSuisPasséChezSo
2017	"Toka"	16	6 (Ultratip*)	SNEP: Platinum	Bandit saleté
2017	"Mon p'tit loup"	9	16 (Ultratip*)	SNEP: Platinum	Bandit saleté
2017	"Dis-leur"	81			Bandit saleté
2017	"Pegase"	83			Bandit saleté
2017	"Cordelette"	105			Bandit saleté
2017	"Parti de rien"	106			Bandit saleté
2017	"Le bruit des blocks"	113			Bandit saleté
2017	"Poto"	42			Bandit saleté
2017	"Marion maréchal"	22		SNEP: Gold	Bandit saleté
2017	"Bois d'argent"	122			Bandit saleté
2017	"Le cercle" (feat. Hornet La Frappe, GLK & YL)	46			Bandit saleté
2017	"Bain de sang" (feat. feat. Bakyl & Samat)	156			Bandit saleté
2018	"Lundi"	3	2 (Ultratip*)	SNEP: Diamond	Affranchis
2018	"#JesuispasséchezSo EP 11"	27			Affranchis
2018	"T'es une galère"	38			Affranchis
2018	"200"	41			Affranchis
2018	"Sous contrôle"	42			Affranchis
2018	"Je fais la fête"	56			Affranchis
2018	"Coluche"	57			Affranchis
2018	"Sa mère"	68			Affranchis
2018	"Arafricain" (feat. Maître Gims)	22			Affranchis
2018	"Cramé"	32			Affranchis
2018	"Mistigris" (feat. Kaaris)	13			Affranchis
2018	"Madame courage" (feat. Soolking)	35			Affranchis
2018	"IDF" (feat. Heuss l'Enfoiré)	49			Affranchis
2018	"#cpasdmafaute" (feat. Bakyl)	82			Affranchis
2020	"Training Day"	133			Non-album singles
2020	"Des malades"	113			Non-album singles
2021	"Case départ"	40			La direction
2021	"Windsor"	57			La direction
2021	"Zidane"	58			La direction
2021	"XIII"	64			La direction
2021	"Monsieur Alexandre"	71			La direction
2021	"Bout de papier" (feat. Sifax)	79			La direction
2021	"C'est la loi" (feat. Zeguerre)	82			La direction
2021	"I.R.F"	83			La direction
2021	"Traumatisé"	91			La direction
2021	"J'te raconte pas" (feat. Kenem)	104			La direction
2021	"Windsor - A Colors Show"	182			La direction
2021	"Ouais Igo"	88			

*Did not appear in the official Belgian Ultratop 50 charts, but rather in the bubbling under Ultratip charts.

== Filmography ==
- 2014: Terremère by Aliou Sow
- 2018: Frères Ennemis (English title Close Enemies) by David Oelhoffen
- 2018: Mauvaises herbes (English title Bad Seeds) by Kheiron
- 2019: Les Sauvages (TV series) (English title Savages) by Sabri Louatah and Rebecca Zlotowski
- 2022: Sous emprise (English title No limit) by David M. Rosenthal
- 2022: Hors Saison (TV series) (English title Off season) by Sarah Farkas, Marine Flores-Ruimi et Claire Kanny
- 2023: La Vénus d'argent (English title Spirit of ectasy) by Héléna Klotz
- 2024: The Wages of Fear as Gauthier
- 2024: Barbès, little Algérie (English title Barbès little Algeria) by Hassan Guerrar
- 2024: Reine mère by Manele Labidi
- 2025: Le roi soleil (English title No one will know) by Vincent Maël Cardona
- 2025: Les règles de l'art (English title The Rules of Art) by Dominique Baumard

== Theatre ==
- 2018: Le Magnifique, adaptation of The Great Gatsby of F. Scott Fitzgerald, at Festival d'Avignon
- 2019: La Mort d'Achille, by Wajdi Mouawad, at Festival d'Avignon

== Videography ==
- 2011: En ouvrant les bras
- 2012: Aller retour
- 2012: Elle était belle
- 2013: Échec et Mat
- 2013: So
- 2013: Ciao bonne vie (feat. Léa Castel)
- 2016: Rapass
- 2016: #JeSuisPasséChezSo (video series)
- 2017: Ma cité a craqué (feat. Bakyl)
- 2017: Tout l'monde s'en fout
- 2017: Bakhaw (feat. Boozoo)
- 2017: Toka
- 2017: Mon ptit loup
- 2017: Bandit saleté
- 2017: Pégase
- 2017: Le cercle (feat. Hornet La Frappe, GLK & YL)
- 2017: Bois d'argent
- 2017: Parti de rien
- 2020: American Airlines Ft. SCH
- 2021: Nouveaux Parrains Ft. Soolking
