= PSO Thug =

- Origin: Porte de Saint-Ouen, 17th arrondissement of Paris
- Genres: French hip hop, Trap
- Years active: 2013-present
- Members: Aéro; Leto
- Website: www.psothug.fr

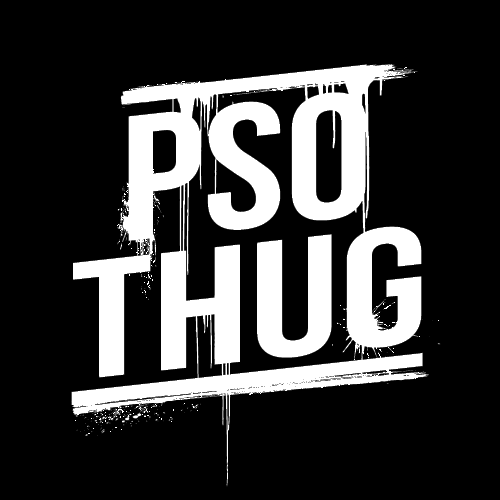
Official logo

PSO Thug is a French hip-hop duo from the 17th arrondissement of Paris, made up of Aéro and Leto. PSO part refers to their origin as they come from Porte de Saint-Ouen (aka PSO)

== Biography ==
In 2014 they started with "Hors la loi". In February 2015, they published the precursor to their mixtape, entitled En attendant Demoniak. In late 2015, they are invited on featuring by KranMax in the track Montre-moi and appear on the Double Fuck mixtape of Kaaris on which they interpret the track Finition. In April 2016, the group released the song "Plein les poches" in featuring with Sadek, accumulating 8 million views in 1 month. The duo released their first mixtape named Demoniak on May 20, 2016, and sell 1,319 copies in its first week of release.

== Members ==
=== Aéro ===
Aéro has produced his own separate material starting 2017 in collaboration with Seul, Money ou Bad Boy. In 2020 he proceeded in his solo 6-track EP Prologue.

=== Leto ===
Signed with Rec. 118, an affiliation of Warner Music France, Leto has pursued besides his collaboration with Aero in PSO Thug, his own solo career by releasing two separate mixtapes Trap$tar and Trap$tar 2 in 2018 and 2019 respectively. Trap$tar 2 had given a collaboration with Ninho in "Tes parents" giving him a charting hit in the Top 20 in France. In 2020 he released his EP Virus as an "avant-album" in preparation of a major release scheduled later this year. with "Train de vie" featuring rapper PLK reaching as high as #11 on the French charts. He is collaborating with Cheu-B, part of group XVBARBAR now known since 2019 as XV.

== Discography: PSO Thug ==
=== Mixtapes ===
Year	Album	Peak positions	
Year	Album	FR	BEL (WA)
2016	Demoniak	43	50
2018	Pause	106	182
2020	Code1.8.7: l'introduction		

=== Singles ===
Year	Single	Peak positions
Year	Single	FR
2016	"Plein les poches" (featuring Sadek)	184

== Discography: Aéro ==
=== EPs ===
- 2020: Prologue EP
