= Demoniak =

Mixtape by PSO Thug
- Released: 20 May 2016
- Recorded: 2015–2016
- Genre: French hip hop, trap
- Label: Independent

PSO Thug chronology
En attendant Demoniak (2015)	Demoniak (2016)

Singles from Demoniak
- 1. "Thuggin"; 2. "Plein les poches" 3. "LGL"; 4. "Tous les jours" 5. "Cauchemar"

Demoniak is the debut mixtape of French trap duo PSO Thug (made up of Aero and Leto), released on May 20, 2016.

== Track listing ==
1. "Demoniak" (2:32)
2. "Cauchemar" (3:36)
3. "Règles du jeu" (3:41)
4. "Autour de moi" (3:12)
5. "Juste après" (3:49)
6. "Thuggin" (2:52)
7. "LGL" (3:43)
8. "Plein les poches" (4:21) (featuring Sadek)
9. "Le magot" (2:35)
10. "Après ce ca$h" (featuring Hayce Lemsi) (4:38)
11. "Tous les jours" (2:43)
12. "Bless" (4:55) (featuring XV Barbar & KranMax)
13. "Numéro uno" (2:20)

== Charts ==
Chart (2016)	Peak position
Belgian Albums (Ultratop Wallonia)	50
French Albums (SNEP)	43
