= Rémy (rapper) =

French rapper

- Also known as: Réminem
- Born: Rémy Camus; 13 January 1997 (age 29); Le Blanc-Mesnil, Seine-Saint-Denis
- Origin: Aubervilliers, Seine-Saint-Denis
- Genres: French rap, conscious rap
- Occupation: Rapper
- Years active: 2017–present
- Label: Def Jam France

Rémy Camus (born 13 January 1997), known mononymously as Rémy, is a French rapper from Aubervilliers, Seine-Saint-Denis.

== History ==
Rémy was born on January 13, 1997, to an assembly line worker father and a mother who was a caretaker of a building in the Pont-blanc neighborhood in Aubervilliers, Seine-Saint-Denis where he grew up. He wrote his first rap songs at the age of 10–11. While a first-year professional baccalaureate student at the Lycée Suger in Saint-Denis, Seine-Saint-Denis, Rémy decided to end his studies to devote himself to a career in hip-hop. He was spotted by emblematic Aubervilliers rapper Mac Tyer, who gave him a solo track on his studio album "Banger 3". The success of his first single "Je vois" earned him to be signed on the label Def Jam France. On July 28, 2017, Rémy released his second single entitled "On traîne". In October 2017, Rémy, invited by Hornet La Frappe, made a much remarked performance when he interpreted the unreleased song "Réminem", on the instrumental of Eminem's "Mockingbird", in live from the "Planète Rap" show on the radio station Skyrock.

Rémy unveiled the singles : "Je te raconte", "Comme à l'Ancienne" featuring Mac Tyer, "Rappelle-toi" and "Un peu ivre", before releasing his first studio album "C'est Rémy" on March 23, 2018. "C'est Rémy" sold 10,191 albums during its first week. During an interview with the Swiss daily newspaper 20 minutes, Rémy reported that the album sold more than 40,000 copies between March and October 2018. The album was finally certified gold on August 5, 2019.

On October 25, 2019, Rémy released his second studio album "Rémy d'Auber".

== Discography ==
=== Studio albums ===
Title	Year	Peak positions		
Title	Year	FRA	BEL (Wa)	SWI
C'est Rémy	2018	6	19	77
Rémy d'Auber	2019	26	55	—
Renaissance	2022	17	74	—
Camus	2023	11	151	—
Le fils de la gardienne	2023	24	—	—
