= Sadek (rapper) =

French rapper

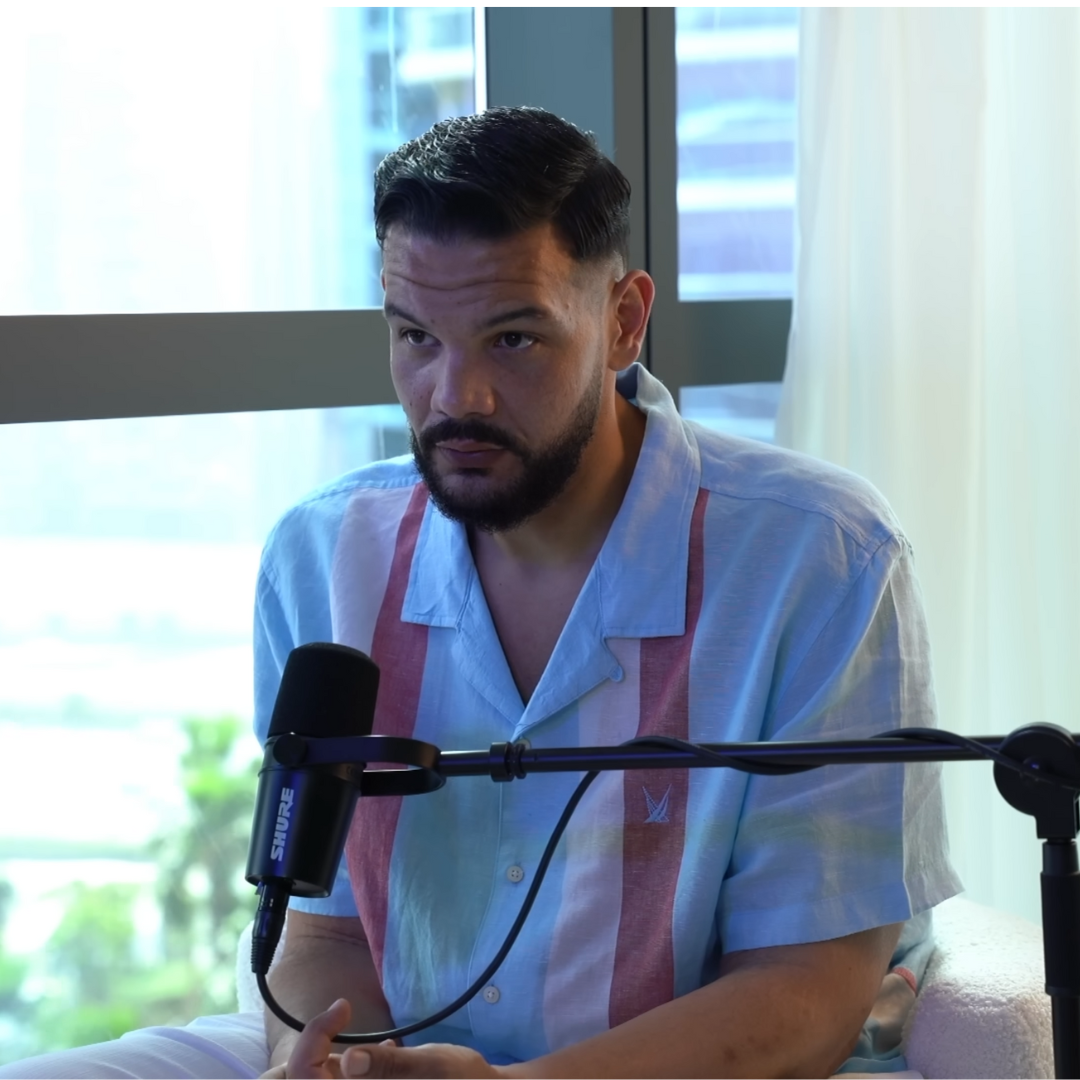
- Sadek (2025)

Background information
- Also known as: Johnny Niuuum, Sadek Niuum
- Born: Sadek Bourguiba; 25 May 1991 (age 35); Neuilly-Plaisance, France
- Genres: Hip hop
- Occupations: Rapper; actor
- Years active: 2012-present

Sadek Bourguiba (born 25 May 1991), known by the mononym Sadek (French pronunciation: [sadɛk]), is a French rapper from Neuilly-Plaisance, also known by aliases Johnny Niuuum and Sadek Niuum. He was signed to Hostile Records.

== Career ==
In 2007, he started in battle rap and freestyle rap, and performed during the streetball tournament "Le Quai 54" gaining favour when Mokobé asked for rappers to perform for 5 minutes. He also caught the attention of the event organizer Hammadoun Sidibé who encouraged him to launch a music project. He appeared on various compilations such as Street lourd, Capitale du Crime and cooperated with DJ Abdel for an album. Since then, he has released 3 mixtapes and one studio album with considerable chart success in France.

End of 2015, Sadek released 6 freestyle tracks under the collective title Roulette-Russe to announce his next project for 2016, Nique le Casino. Six tracks were chosen being a reference to the number of bullets that can be inserted in the cylinder of a .357 Magnum gun, a popular arm in practice of this deadly game.

In 2016, he co-starred with Gérard Depardieu in the film Tour de France.

On February 10, 2020, Sadek and three other people took part in the assault of French YouTuber Bassem Braïki. This attack comes after the cancellation on February 8 of a showcase in Saint-Priest, Rhône that Bassem called to disturb. After exchanging messages and sending an address, the rapper and his team went to the blogger's home and beat him on the ground with batons and kicks. Videos of the attack taken by Sadek himself were posted on Snapchat and Twitter.

In January 2023, he announced that his album Changement de propriétaire will be released on 27 January. The album does not include any featuring.

== Discography ==
=== Albums ===
Year	Album	Peak positions			Certification
Year	Album	FRA	BEL (Wa)	SWI	Certification
2013	Les frontières du réel	29	–	–	
2017	#VVRDL	5	16	–	
2018	Johnny de Janeiro	–	–	–	
2021	Aimons-nous vivants	5	13	25	
2023	Changement de propriétaire	8	49	–	
2023	Ouvert tout l'été	4	93	–	

== Mixtapes ==
Year	Album / Mixtape	Type	Peak positions			Certification
Year	Album / Mixtape	Type	FRA	BEL (Wa)	SWI	Certification
2012	La légende de Johnny Niuuum	Mixtape	70	–	–	
2015	En Attendant JNNMJ2 (in preparation for Johnny Niuuum ne meurt jamais)	Mixtape	–	–	–	
2015	Johnny Niuuum ne meurt jamais	Mixtape	18	35	–	
2015	Roulette Russe	Freestyle mixtape	–	–	–	
2016	Nique Le Casino	Mixtape	13	22	–	FR: Gold

=== Singles ===
Year	Single	Peak positions		Album
Year	Single	FRA	BEL (Wa)	Album
2013	"Mektoub"	184	—	Les frontières du réel
2016	"Andale" (featuring Gradur)	24	39* (Ultratip)	Nique le casino
2016	"La paresse" (featuring SCH)	130	39* (Ultratip)	Nique le casino
2016	"La bise" (featuring Brulux)	166	36* (Ultratip)	Nique le casino
2017	"Petit prince"	114		
2017	"Dans la lune"	73		
2017	"En leuleu" (featuring Niska)	49	—	#VVRDL
2017	"Madre mia" (featuring Ninho)	7	—	#VVRDL
2017	"La vache"	26	—	#VVRDL
2018	"Bep bep"	71	—	Non-album release
2021	"Kimono" (feat. SCH & Ninho)	8	—	Aimons-nous vivants
2023	"TP"	6	—	Ouvert tout l'été

*Did not appear in the official Belgian Ultratop 50 charts, but rather in the bubbling under Ultratip charts.

=== Other songs ===
Year	Single	Peak positions		Album
Year	Single	FRA	BEL (Wa)	Album
2017	"Napoli"	76	—	#VVRDL
2017	"Bender"	86	—	#VVRDL
2017	"Les gants"	87	—	#VVRDL
2017	"La rue c'est paro"	99	—	#VVRDL
2017	"Cartier panthère"	112	—	#VVRDL
2017	"Maladie"	113	—	#VVRDL
2017	"Sanz"	126	—	#VVRDL
2017	"La tour" (feat. Jok'Air)	137	—	#VVRDL
2017	"Imma"	142	—	#VVRDL
2017	"Zahouania"	144	—	#VVRDL
2018	"9 milli" (feat. Kofs)	151	—	
2018	"Tentacíon"	55	—	Johnny de Janeiro
2018	"JDJ"	66	—	Johnny de Janeiro
2018	"Encore" (feat. Sofiane)	110	—	Johnny de Janeiro
2018	"Kameha"	123	—	Johnny de Janeiro
2018	"Ariva" (feat. MHD)	163	—	Johnny de Janeiro
2018	"Somnambule"	185	—	Johnny de Janeiro
2019	"Roulette Russe 6.5"	123	—	TBA
2019	"Roulette Russe 7 #Thanos"	144	—	TBA
2019	"Roulette Russe 8 #Smitters"	175	—	TBA
2020	"Roulette Russe 11 #Trophées"	200	—	TBA
2021	"Alliance" (feat. Vald)	53	—	Aimons-nous vivants
2021	"Soutien" (feat. Fianso & Heuss l'Enfoiré)	88	—	Aimons-nous vivants
2021	"Aller-retour"	86	—	Aimons-nous vivants
2021	"Scottie Pippen"	121	—	Aimons-nous vivants
2021	"Robuste"	125	—	Aimons-nous vivants
2021	"Intro"	152	—	Aimons-nous vivants
2021	"La source"	155	—	Aimons-nous vivants
2021	"CBD"	162	—	Aimons-nous vivants
2021	"Croisière"	171	—	Aimons-nous vivants
2021	"Abu Dhabi"	188	—	Aimons-nous vivants

=== Featured in ===
Year	Single	Peak positions		Album
Year	Single	FRA	BEL (Wa)	Album
2015	"6.35" (Lacrim featuring SCH & Sadek)	134	—	R.I.P.R.O. Volume 1
2015	"Pas de manières" (SCH featuring Sadek & Lapso)	119	—	A7
2015	"Boulette en métal" (Seth Gueko featuring Sadek & Joke)	—	—	Professeur Punchline
2016	"Mon frelo" (Kore, Lapso Laps, Lacrim, Sadek & SCH)	75	—	Packman
2016	"Plein les poches" (PSO Thug feat. Sadek)	184	—	Demoniak
2018	"Tout est neuf" (Dosseh feat. Sadek)	36	—	
2018	"Woah" (Sofiane feat. Vald, Mac Tyer, Soolking, Kalash Criminel, Sadek & Heuss l'Enfoiré)	5	—	93 Empire
2018	"Maman veut pas" (Q.E Favelas, Sadek & GLK)	52	—	93 Empire
2018	"Drive by" (Sadek, Dinos & Ixzo)	102	—	93 Empire
2019	"La loi du talion" (Da Uzi feat. Sadek)	154	—	Mexico
2020	"Ça recommence" (Brulux feat. Sadek)	149	—	Brulux album Le sans pitax
2021	"La vie de binks" (Da Uzi, Ninho & SCH feat. Hornet La Frappe, Leto, Sadek & Soprano)	5	6* (Ultratip)	Non-album release

*Did not appear in the official Belgian Ultratop 50 charts, but rather in the bubbling under Ultratip charts.
