= Hornet La Frappe =

French rapper of Algerian descent

- Born: Mounir Ben Chettouh; December 5, 1992 (age 33)
- Origin: Orgemont, Epinay-sur-Seine, Seine-Saint-Denis, Paris
- Genres: French rap
- Years active: 2012-present
- Labels: Diez Peufra, Rec. 118, Warner

Hornet La Frappe (French pronunciation: [ɔʁnɛt la fʁap]) is a French rapper of Algerian descent from Epinay-sur-Seine, Seine-Saint-Denis, in the northern suburbs of Paris. He started rapping in 2012 and released his first mixtape Réussir ou Mounir in 2014 and the follow-up mixtape Nous-mêmes on 29 September 2017. "Gramme 2 Peuf" was his first big success as a single.

== Discography ==
=== Studio albums ===
Year	Album	Peak positions		
Year	Album	FRA	BEL (Wa)	SWI
2018	Dans les yeux	4	13	43
2020	Ma ruche	5	13	&1
2021	Toujours nous-mêmes	3	28	—
2023	Avant cités d'or	39	170	—

=== Mixtapes ===
Year	Album	Peak positions	
Year	Album	FRA	BEL (Wa)
2014	Réussir ou Mounir	—	—
2017	Nous-mêmes	17	22

=== Singles ===
Year	Title	Peak positions		Album
Year	Title	FRA	BEL (Wa)	Album
2017	"Gramme 2 peuf"	48	25 (Ultratip)*	Nous-mêmes
2017	"Je pense à toi"	9	13 (Ultratip)*	Nous-mêmes
2018	"Valise" (with Vald)	66	—	non-album single
2018	"Taga"	148	16 (Ultratip)*	Dans les yeux
2019	"La peuf 4"	126	—	non-album singles
2020	"C'est mort" (featuring Leto and RK)	42	13 (Ultratip)*	non-album singles
2020	"Calumet"	15		non-album singles
2020	"Tourner la tête"	40	—	non-album singles
2021	"Kedaba"	53	—	

*Did not appear in the official Belgian Ultratop 50 charts, but rather in the bubbling under Ultratip charts.

=== Featured in ===
Year	Title	Peak positions		Album
Year	Title	FRA	BEL (Wa)	Album
2017	"Le cercle" (Sofiane feat. Hornet La Frappe, GLK & YL)	134	—	
2018	"Longue vie" (Sofiane feat. Ninho & Hornet La Frappe)	2	45	
2018	"Larry Hoover" (Hooss feat. Hornet La Frappe)	161	—	Hoos album Woodstock
2019	"93% (Tijuana)" (GLK feat. Landy, Da Uzi & Hornet La Frappe)	13	9* (Ultratip)	GLK album Bedo
2020	"DDD" (Soso Maness feat. Hornet La Frappe)	198	—	Soso Maness album Mistral
2021	"La vie de binks" (Da Uzi, Ninho & SCH feat. Hornet La Frappe, Leto, Sadek & Soprano)	5	6* (Ultratip)	Non-album release

*Did not appear in the official Belgian Ultratop 50 charts, but rather in the bubbling under Ultratip charts.

=== Other charting songs ===
Year	Title	Peak positions		Album
Year	Title	FRA	BEL (Wa)	Album
2017	"Maghrébin"	42	—	Nous-mêmes
2017	"Igo"	76	—	Nous-mêmes
2017	"Boca"	82	—	Nous-mêmes
2017	"T'as géchan"	92	—	Nous-mêmes
2017	"Ça passe"	97	—	Nous-mêmes
2017	"Poukie"	101	—	Nous-mêmes
2017	"Sale idée"	103	—	Nous-mêmes
2017	"2 fois plus"	120	—	Nous-mêmes
2017	"Mon ex"	100	—	Nous-mêmes
2017	"T'es un marrant" (feat. Sofiane)	148	—	Nous-mêmes
2017	"Misère"	155	—	Nous-mêmes
2017	"Dead ça"	35	—	Nous-mêmes
2017	"Terrain glissant" (feat. Kalash Criminel)	181	—	Nous-mêmes
2018	"Bourgeoisie"	166	—	
2018	"Sheitana" (feat. Ninho)	12	28 (Ultratip*)	Dans les yeux
2018	"Rolls" (feat. Lacrim)	15	25 (Ultratip*)	Dans les yeux
2018	"Même secteur" (feat. Heuss l'Enfoiré)	43	—	Dans les yeux
2018	"Joe Dassin"	82	—	Dans les yeux
2018	"Ce matin"	83	—	Dans les yeux
2018	"Flash à la main"	97	—	Dans les yeux
2018	"T'as qu'à tirer"	99	—	Dans les yeux
2018	"Échographie"	114	—	Dans les yeux
2018	"Bandit"	141	—	Dans les yeux
2018	"Avec des si"	148	—	Dans les yeux
2018	"Neuf trois huit"	158	—	Dans les yeux
2018	"Hanoute"	172	—	Dans les yeux
2018	"Sale gosse" (feat. Rh Las)	176	—	Dans les yeux
2018	"Warning"	185	—	Dans les yeux
2018	"40 ans"	193	—	Dans les yeux
2018	"La maille" (with Rémy & Kalash Criminel)	83	—	93 Empire
2018	"93 Coast" (with Sofiane)	94	—	93 Empire
2018	"Viens dans mon 93" (with Dinos & Sofiane)	159	—	93 Empire
2019	"Bedo"	120	—	non-album singles
2019	"Bonnie"	96	—	non-album singles
2020	"Ma racli"	90	—	Ma ruche
2020	"Plus fort"	98	—	Ma ruche
2020	"G.M."	136	—	Ma ruche
2020	"Deux secondes"	178	—	Ma ruche
2020	"Gardav"	190	—	Ma ruche
2020	"Divorce"	194	—	Ma ruche
2020	"La médicale"	198	—	Ma ruche
2021	"Le big mif" (feat. Zaho)	159	—	non-album singles
2021	"Maison d'arrêt" (feat. Maes)	63	—	non-album singles
2021	"Gasolina" (feat. Ninho)	8	—	Toujours nous-mêmes
2021	"Main de fer"	84	—	Toujours nous-mêmes
2021	"Charcleur"	108	—	Toujours nous-mêmes
2021	"D'un trait"	113	—	Toujours nous-mêmes
2021	"Riche comme un tuche" (feat. Dwen)	119	—	Toujours nous-mêmes
2021	"Schott"	129	—	Toujours nous-mêmes
2021	"Image"	133	—	Toujours nous-mêmes
2021	"Jasmin"	134	—	Toujours nous-mêmes
2021	"Machiavélique"	135	—	Toujours nous-mêmes
2021	"Raton"	136	—	Toujours nous-mêmes
2021	"Sort de mon sommeil"	141	—	Toujours nous-mêmes
2021	"Restez comme t'es"	153	—	Toujours nous-mêmes

*Did not appear in the official Belgian Ultratop 50 charts, but rather in the bubbling under Ultratip charts.
