= Vald (rapper) =

French rapper

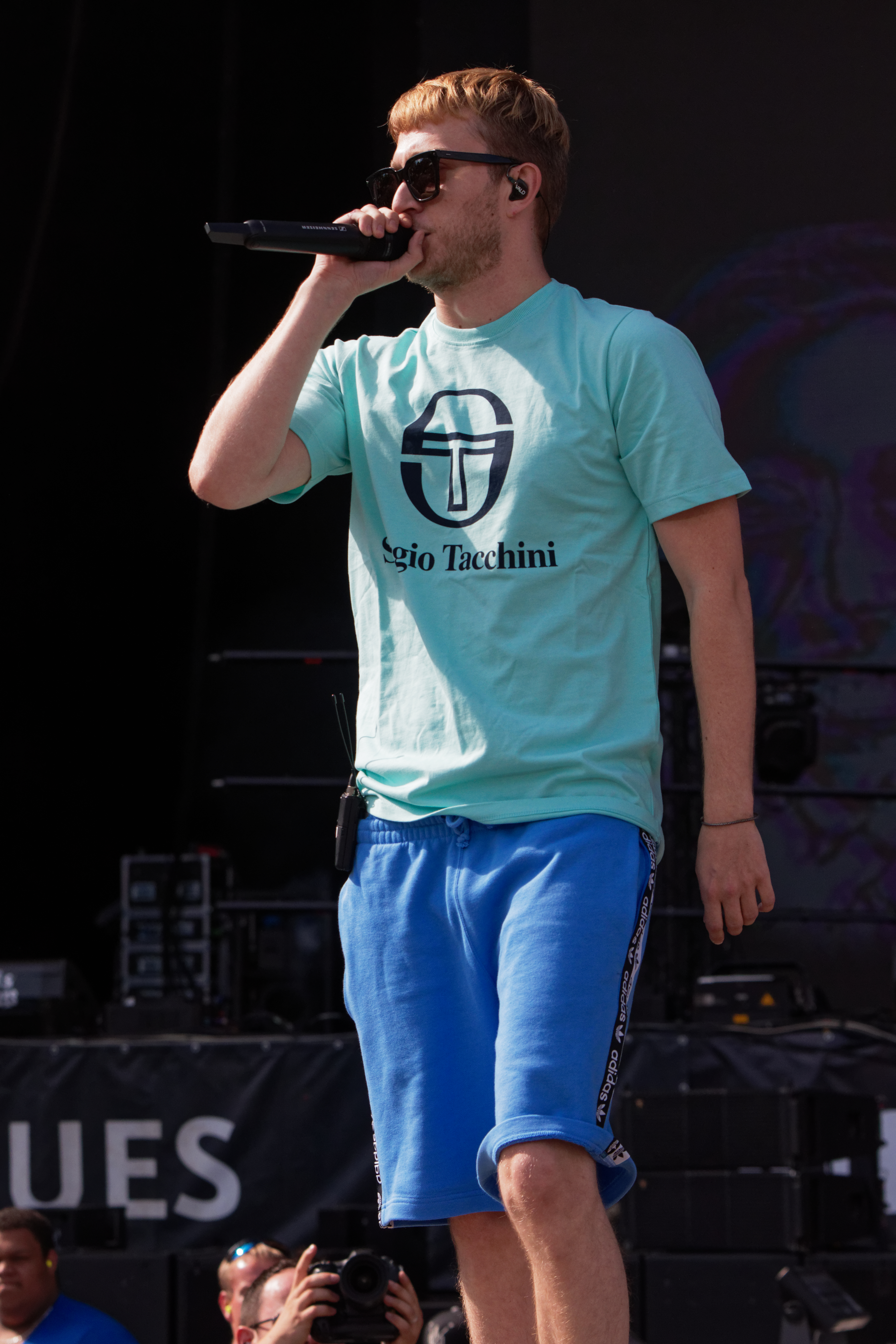
- Vald performing live in 2019

Background information
- Born: Valentin Le Du; 15 July 1992 (age 34); Le Blanc-Mesnil, Seine-Saint-Denis, France
- Genres: Cloud rap, comedy rap
- Occupation: Rapper
- Years active: 2010-present
- Labels: Mezoued Records, Millenium, Capitol, Universal Music
- Website: vald.tv

Valentin Le Du (French pronunciation: [valɑ̃tɛ̃ lə dy]; born 15 July 1992), better known by his stage name Vald (French: [vald]; sometimes stylized as VALD), is a French rapper.

== Life and Career ==
Raised in Aulnay-sous-Bois, in Seine-Saint-Denis, Île-de-France, he studied at Lycée privé catholique l'Espérance where he received a Baccalauréat S (Sciences). He then studied medicine for a semester before moving to Mathematics/computer science, graduating with a bachelor's degree, known in France as a licence. He also studied sound engineering.

He started rapping at age 17. He released a mixtape, NQNTMQMQMB (Ni Queue Ni Tête Mais Qui Met Quand Même Bien) in 2012, followed by another mixtape Cours de rattrapage the same year. Both were re-edited in 2016 as a double CD released through his website. On 27 October 2014, he released his debut EP NQNT (Ni Queue Ni Tête) with a music video, Bonjour, finding success. It was followed by the release of EP NQNT 2 on 25 September 2015. On 20 January 2017, he released his debut album Agartha on Mezoued Records & Suther Kane Films, and on Millenium, Capitol, Universal; the album earned a platinum certification in France. A leak of song material resulted in the release of the EP project NQNT 3. On 2 February 2018, Vald released his second album XEU featuring collaborations with rappers Sirius, Suik'on Blaz AD and Sofiane; the album received a double platinum certification. This was followed by the mixtape NQNT33 in September 2018. In October 2019, he released a third album, Ce monde est cruel (This world is cruel).

== Personal life ==
Vald is of Breton descent through his father. In an interview with radio station Mouv', he stated he has a son, Charles, born in 2014.

== Discography ==
=== Albums ===
Year	Album	Peak positions				Certification
Year	Album	FRA	BEL (Fl)	BEL (Wa)	SWI	Certification
2017	Agartha	2	—	6	15	FRA: 3× Platinum
2018	XEU	1	98	1	4	FRA: 4× Platinum
2019	Ce monde est cruel	1	28	1	3	FRA: 2× Platinum
2020	Horizon vertical (joint album with Heuss l'Enfoiré)	20	—	20	71	FRA: Gold
2022	V	1	43	1	1	FRA: 2× Platinum
2025	Pandémonium	1	—	2	6	
2025	Magnificat	23	—	32	37	

=== EPs ===
Year	Album	Peak positions	
Year	Album	FRA	BEL (Wa)
2014	NQNT	66	139
2015	NQNT 2	11	24
2018	NQNT 33	8	10

=== Singles ===
Year	Title	Peak positions			Album
Year	Title	FRA	BEL (Wa)	SWI	Album
2017	"Trophée"	37	—	—	XEU
2018	"Désaccordé"	1	9	75	XEU
2019	"Journal perso II"	4	29	91	Ce monde est cruel
2021	"Footballeur"	31	—	—	
2022	"Anunnaki"	4	37	66	V
2022	"Peon" (featuring Orelsan)	1	33	67	V
2025	"Gauche droite"	46	—	—	Pandémonium

=== Other charted songs ===
Year	Title	Peak positions			Album
Year	Title	FRA	BEL (Wa)	SWI	Album
2016	"Eurotrap"	118	—	—	Agartha
2017	"Je t'aime"	171	—	—	Agartha
2017	"Ma meilleure amie"	49	—	—	Agartha
2017	"Vitrine" (feat. Damso)	71	17 (Ultratip*)	—	Agartha
2018	"Primitif"	5	—	—	XEU
2018	"Dragon" (feat. Sofiane)	4	—	—	XEU
2018	"Possédé"	9	—	—	XEU
2018	"Gris"	10	—	—	XEU
2018	"Résidus"	12	—	—	XEU
2018	"Seum"	13	—	—	XEU
2018	"Offshore" (feat. Suikon Blaz AD)	15	—	—	XEU
2018	"Chépakichui"	20	—	—	XEU
2018	"Réflexions basses"	21	—	—	XEU
2018	"Dqtp"	24	—	—	XEU
2018	"Deviens génial"	26	—	—	XEU
2018	"Rituel" (feat. Sirius)	30	—	—	XEU
2018	"J'entertain"	31	—	—	XEU
2018	"Rocking Chair"	32	—	—	XEU
2018	"Ne me déteste pas"	48	—	—	XEU
2018	"Valise" (with Hornet La Frappe)	66	—	—	Game Over
2018	"Non Stop"	54	—	—	NQNT 33
2018	"Mana"	63	—	—	NQNT 33
2018	"YAX3"	76	—	—	NQNT 33
2018	"Berflam"	107	—	—	NQNT 33
2018	"Foie gras"	112	—	—	NQNT 33
2018	"Rhumance"	114	—	—	NQNT 33
2018	"Rechute"	122	—	—	NQNT 33
2018	"No Tube Zone"	139	—	—	NQNT 33
2018	"Vlad"	173	—	—	NQNT 33
2018	"Baby Squirt"	186	—	—	NQNT 33
2018	"MacDo"	199	—	—	NQNT 33
2018	"Iencli" (with Sofiane)	11	—	—	93 Empire
2019	"Poches pleines"	16	—	—	Ce monde est cruel
2019	"NQNTMQMQMB" (featuring Suikon Blaz AD)	11	—	—	Ce monde est cruel
2019	"Ce monde est cruel"	9	—	—	Ce monde est cruel
2019	"Pensionman"	19	—	—	Ce monde est cruel
2019	"Ma star"	27	—	—	Ce monde est cruel
2019	"Ignorant"	13	—	—	Ce monde est cruel
2019	"Halloween"	10	—	—	Ce monde est cruel
2019	"Dernier retrait" (featuring SCH)	5	—	93	Ce monde est cruel
2019	"Keskivonfer"	14	—	—	Ce monde est cruel
2019	"Pourquoi"	31	—	—	Ce monde est cruel
2019	"J'pourrai"	28	—	—	Ce monde est cruel
2019	"No Friends"	26	—	—	Ce monde est cruel
2019	"ASB" (featuring Maes)	18	—	—	Ce monde est cruel
2019	"Royal Bacon"	36	—	—	Ce monde est cruel
2019	"Rappel"	38	—	—	Ce monde est cruel
2020	"Gotaga"	6	43	—	
2020	"C'est pas nous les méchants"	131	—	—	
2020	"Guccissima" (with Heuss L'Enfoiré)	27	—	—	
2020	"Matrixé" (with Heuss L'Enfoiré)	33	—	—	
2020	"Canada" (with Heuss L'Enfoiré)	16	—	—	
2022	"Maudit"	5	—	—	V
2022	"La Faux Le Fer"	6	—	—	V
2022	"Pandemie"	7	—	94	V
2022	"Papoose"	9	—	—	V
2022	"Sur Un Nouvel Album"	10	—	—	V
2022	"Un Mot"	11	—	—	V
2022	"Regarde Toi"	13	—	—	V
2022	"Rappeur Conscient"	15	—	—	V
2022	"Je Ressens Rien"	19	—	—	V
2022	"Happy End"	22	—	—	V
2022	"Laisse Tomber"	23	—	—	V
2022	"Bien Sur"	24	—	—	V
2022	"Pas Deux Fois"	27	—	—	V
2022	"Qui Ecoute ?"	30	—	—	V
2025	"Dieu Merci"	24	—	—	Pandémonium
2025	"Regulation"	34	—	—	Pandémonium
2025	"Lethargie"	43	—	—	Pandémonium
2025	"Roche Noire"	47	—	—	Pandémonium
2025	"Pandemonium"	49	—	—	Pandémonium
2025	"Fumee"	53	—	—	Pandémonium
2025	"Flpvcof"	55	—	—	Pandémonium
2025	"Darknet"	56	—	—	Pandémonium
2025	"Prozaczopixan"	58	—	—	Pandémonium
2025	"Superman"	63	—	—	Pandémonium
2025	"Que Des Problemes"	64	—	—	Pandémonium
2025	"Ufov"	75	—	—	Pandémonium
2025	"93 Milliards"	87	—	—	Pandémonium
2025	"Interlude"	92	—	—	Pandémonium
2025	"Paradis Perdu"	98	—	—	Pandémonium

*Did not appear in the official Belgian Ultratop 50 charts, but rather in the bubbling under Ultratip charts.

=== Featured in ===
Year	Title	Peak positions		Album
Year	Title	FRA	BEL (Wa)	Album
2018	"Bizarre" (Lorenzo feat. Vald)	4	17 (Ultratip*)	Lorenzo album Rien à branler
2018	"Woah" (Sofiane feat. Vald, Mac Tyer, Soolking, Kalash Criminel, sadek & Heuss l'Enfoiré)	7	12 (Ultratip*)	93 Empire
2018	"L'addition" (Heuss L'Enfoiré feat. Vald)	84	—	Heuss L'Enfoiré album En esprit
2018	"Qui dit mieux" (Gringe feat. Orelsan, Vald & Suikon Blaz AD)	24	15 (Ultratip*)	Gringe album Enfant lune
2018	"Un jour de plus" (Kalash Criminel feat. Vald)	124	—	Kalash Criminel album La fosse aux lions
2019	"Elévation" (Vald x Vladimir Cauchemar)	64		
2019	"J'suis loin " (Jul feat. Vald)	31		
2019	"Bitch" (Lefa feat. Vald)	10	12 (Ultratip*)	
2020	"Pour eux" (Naps feat. Vald)	90		Naps album Carré VIP
2020	"Pas de reine" (Koba LaD feat. Vald)	5		Koba LaD album Détail
2020	"Jetez pas l'oeil" (Maître Gims feat. Vald)	52		Maître Gims album Le Fléau
2021	"Alliance" (Sadek feat. Vald)	53		Sadek album Aimons-nous vivants

*Did not appear in the official Belgian Ultratop 50 charts, but rather in the bubbling under Ultratip charts.

== Awards and nominations ==
=== Berlin Music Video Awards ===
The Berlin Music Video Awards is an international festival that promotes the art of music videos.

Year	Nominated work	Award	Result	Ref.
2026	"PROZACZOPIXAN"	Best Concept	Won	
