= Kalash Criminel =

French rapper

Amira Kiziamina, known better by his stage name Kalash Criminel, is a French rapper. He was born with the melanin deficient condition albinism, and is usually seen wearing a balaclava. When his musical activities began, he had to hide his face as his mother did not want him to rap. However, he received positive reactions for wearing the balaclava, and now wears it by choice, including during press interviews. He is signed to Def Jam Recordings and Universal Music. He collaborates often with Kaaris, with whom he notably made the song "Arrêt du Cœur" on his album R.A.S, in addition to collaborations with numerous peers.

== Biography ==
Kalash Criminel was born in Zaïre, now known as the Democratic Republic of the Congo on 14 February 1995. Initially, he lived in Kinshasa with his family, but with the onset of the First Congo War, he and his family fled to France. He and his family arrived in Rougemont, in Sevran and have been living there since. In his youth, he began to rap, initially becoming a part of the group Hall 14 with the rappers Daystiil, Kifa, Krimo JS et Zino5. This group was later signed to the label 10/12 Records. In 2012, they released a demo, titled Traumatiser, which solidified their collaboration and work.

In 2015, Kiziamina began his solo career and released the song "10 12 14 Bureau", and subsequently released a series of freestyles titled Sauvagerie. He subsequently collaborated with rappers Ixzo, Sofiane, Kaaris and Jul.

His collaboration with Kaaris yielded the song "Arrêt du cœur" which guaranteed and launched his career in French rap. On 23 September 2016, he released his first music video titled "Sale Sonorité". This video has in excess of 10 million views on YouTube. On 26 September 2016, he announced the release of his first mixtape, titled R.A.S., which was slated for release on 28 October 2016. In its first week, R.A.S sold 2,970 copies.

On 23 November 2018, Kiziamina released his first studio album, La Fosse aux lions, under his label, Sale sonorité Records. Response was favourable, with 13,388 copies sold in the first week.

== Discography ==
=== Albums and mixtapes ===
Year	Album	Peak positions				Certification	Notes
Year	Album	FR	BEL (FL)	BEL (Wa)	SWI	Certification	Notes
2016	R.A.S	22	–	29	100		Track listing: 1. "Famas" (2:51); 2. "Tu sais où nous trouver" (4:14); 3. "Makila" (feat. Douma) (3:12); 4. "Sauvagerie 2" (2:57); 5. "Sale sonorité" (3:12); 6. "Carré vip" (4:16); 7. "Arrêt du cœur" (feat. Kaaris) (4:23); 8. "10 12 14 bureau" (3:24); 9. "Shabba" (feat. Hall 14) (4:40); 10. "Guedro" (3:57)
2017	Oyoki	25	–	23	79		Track listing: 1. "Polnareff" (1:34); 2. "Euphorie" (4:01); 3. "Bénéfice" (4:15); 4. "Enterrez-les" (3:05); 5. "Nada" (feat. Douma) (3:55); 6. "Glové - Tchernobyl" (3:43); 7. "Piano sombre" (1:40); 8. "Je ne comprends pas" (feat. Jul) (4:26); 9. "Shottas" (3:29); 10. "Guedro (Remix)" (feat. Mac Tyer, Sofiane & Vald) (5:15); 11. "Docks - Chacun ses raisons" (3:45); 12. "Ce genre de mec" (2:40); 13. "Mélanger" (feat. Keblack) (3:12); 14. "Hood" (3:19); 15. "T'es mort" (4:48)
2018	La fosse aux lions	7	149	28	44		Track listing: 1. "La SACEM de Florent Pagny" (3:07); 2. "Ahou" (3:11); 3. "Dans la fosse" (3:17); 4. "Aucun lien" (2:57); 5. "Coltan" (3:17); 6. "47 AK" (feat. Gradur) (3:54); 7. "Sombre" (3:28); 8. "A dix" (3:28); 9. "Ça va ma chérie" (3:16); 10. "Plus loin" (3:47); 11. "On fait la fête" (3:41); 12. "Savage" (feat. Soolking) (2:49); 13. "Homicide volontaire" (3:02); 14. "Un jour de plus" (feat. Vald) (2:45); 15. "Tête Brûlée" (4:11); 16. "Encore" (3:08); 17. "Vrai" (feat. Douma) (3:20); 18. "Avant que j'parte" (4:19)
2020	Sélection naturelle	4	120	5	35		Track listing: 1. "Insta Twitter" (2:57); 2. "Doute" (3:14); 3. "Tarifs" (3:23); 4. Tu paniques" (feat. Niska (3:29); 5. "J'oublie pas" (2:44); 6. "But en or"(feat. Damso) (2:59); 7. "Sale boulot" (3:12); 8. "Shooter" (3:27); 9. "Dans la zone" (feat. Jul (2:53); 10. "Elle est gang" (3:00); 11. "Droga" (feat. 26 Keuss) (3:26); 12. "Death Note" (2:56); 13. "Moments" (feat. Bigflo & Oli) (4:58); 14. "Incompris" (3:03); 15. "Très mauvais" (2:59); 16. "Turn Up" (feat. Nekfeu) (3:30); 17. "Finish Him" (2:41)
2024	Bon courage	—	—	7	10		

=== Singles ===
Year	Title	Peak positions			Album
Year	Title	FR	BEL (Wa)	SWI	Album
2016	"Arrêt du cœur" (with Kaaris)	61	32* (Ultratip)		R.A.S
2016	"Sale sonorité"	104	–		R.A.S
2017	"Euphorie"	76	–		Oyoki
2017	"Enterrez-les"	91	29* (Ultratip)		Oyoki
2018	"Tête brûlée"	111	–		La fosse aux lions
2018	"Sombre"	16	–		La fosse aux lions
2020	"But en or" (with Damso)	10	34	92	Sélection naturelle
2022	"Apocalypse" (with Kaaris and Freeze Corleone)	2	46		

*Did not appear in the official Belgian Ultratop 50 charts, but rather in the bubbling under Ultratip charts.

=== Other charted songs ===
Year	Title	Peak positions		Album
Year	Title	FR	BEL (Wa)	Album
2016	"Tu sais où nous trouver "	157	–	R.A.S
2016	"Famas"	193	–	R.A.S
2017	"Je ne comprends pas" (feat. Jul)	78	25* (Ultratip)	Oyoki
2017	"Mélanger" (feat. Keblack)	191	–	Oyoki
2017	"Polnareff"	137	–	Oyoki
2017	"Piano sombre"	147	–	Oyoki
2017	"Guedro"	152	–	Oyoki
2017	"Hood"	154	–	Oyoki
2017	"Shottas"	173	–	Oyoki
2017	"Bénéfice"	175	–	Oyoki
2018	"La sacem de Florent Pagny"	26	–	La fosse aux lions
2018	"Ahou"	27	–	La fosse aux lions
2018	"Cooger gang"	33	–	La fosse aux lions
2018	"Encore"	44	–	La fosse aux lions
2018	"47AK" (feat. Gradur)	47	–	La fosse aux lions
2018	"Dans la fosse"	56	–	La fosse aux lions
2018	"Aucun lien"	72	–	La fosse aux lions
2018	"Coltan"	77	–	La fosse aux lions
2018	"Ça va ma chérie"	84	–	La fosse aux lions
2018	"Savage" (feat. Soolking)	85	–	La fosse aux lions
2018	"À dix"	94	–	La fosse aux lions
2018	"Plus loin"	99	–	La fosse aux lions
2018	"On fait la fête"	109	–	La fosse aux lions
2018	"Un jour de plus" (feat. Vald)	124	–	La fosse aux lions
2018	"Homicide volontaire"	161	–	La fosse aux lions
2018	"Vrai" (feat. Douma)	178	–	La fosse aux lions
2020	"Écrasement de tête"	184	–	
2020	"Dans la zone" (feat. Jul)	19	–	Sélection naturelle
2020	"Turn Up" (feat. Nekfeu)	22	–	Sélection naturelle
2020	"Tu paniques" (feat. Niska)	24	–	Sélection naturelle
2020	"Insta Twitter"	67	–	Sélection naturelle
2020	"Tarifs"	86	–	Sélection naturelle
2020	"Sale boulot"	88	–	Sélection naturelle
2020	"Doute"	91	–	Sélection naturelle
2020	"J'oublie pas"	98	–	Sélection naturelle
2020	"Shooter"	105	–	Sélection naturelle
2020	"Death Note"	112	–	Sélection naturelle
2020	"Elle est gang"	115	–	Sélection naturelle
2020	"Moments" (feat. Bigflo & Oli)	120	–	Sélection naturelle
2020	"incompris"	144	–	Sélection naturelle
2020	"Finish Him"	163	–	Sélection naturelle
2020	"Très mauvais"	184	–	Sélection naturelle

*Did not appear in the official Belgian Ultratop 50 charts, but rather in the bubbling under Ultratip charts.

=== Featured in ===
Year	Title	Peak positions		Album
Year	Title	FR	BEL (Wa)	Album
2016	"4matic" (Kaaris feat. Kalash Criminel)	157	–	Kaaris album Okou Gnakouri
2017	"93 Empire" (Sofiane feat. Kalash Criminel)	121	–	Sofiane album #JeSuisPasséChezSo
2017	"Cagoulé" (Jul feat. Kalash Criminel)	159	–	
2017	"Terrain glissant" (Hornet La Frappe feat. Luciano)	181	–	Hornet La Frappe mixtape Nous-mêmes
2017	"Dress Code" (Black M feat. Kalash Criminel)	139	–	
2017	"Bling Bling" (Kaaris feat. Kalash Criminel & Sofiane)	9	3* (Ultratip)	
2018	"Woah" (Sofiane feat. Vald, Mac Tyer, Soolking, Kalash Criminel, Sadek & Heuss l'Enfoiré)	5	12* (Ultratip)	93 Empire album 93 Empire
2019	"Polémique" (Kalash feat. Kalash Criminel)	82	–	Kalash album Diamond Rock
2019	"Patek" (Alkpote feat. Kalash Criminel)	198	–	Alkpote album Monument

*Did not appear in the official Belgian Ultratop 50 charts, but rather in the bubbling under Ultratip charts.
