= Heuss l'Enfoiré =

French rapper

- Also known as: Heuss, Heustleur
- Born: Karim Djeriou; 11 August 1992 (age 34); Gennevilliers, Île-de-France, France
- Genres: French rap, trap music, hip hop music, House music
- Occupation: Rapper
- Years active: 2014-present
- Label: Affranchis Music

Karim Djeriou (Arabic: كريم جريو; born August 11, 1992), better known by his stage name Heuss l'Enfoiré (French pronunciation: [(h)øs lɑ̃fwaʁe]; lit. 'Heuss the Tosser', sounding like "Huss"), is a French rapper and singer of Algerian origins.

== Early life ==
He was born in Villeneuve-la-Garenne, into a family of Algerian origins, in the Hauts-de-Seine department. He grew up in La Sablière quarter of the city and later in Saint-Ouen in Seine-Saint-Denis. At the age of 20, he moved to Schaerbeek, Brussels, Belgium.

== Career ==
He started rapping in 2014, under the pseudonym Heustleur (sounding like Hustler), signed to Esprit Music record label. In 2015, he released videos, gaining fame, particularly when he was featured with rapper Kofs. He was briefly imprisoned but he moved on with rappers Zepek, Soolking and others, engaging in a number of freestyles with stories of the banlieues.

In 2017, the rapper Sofiane invited him to the show Rentre dans le Cercle alongside more established acts like Sinik, Bigflo & Oli, gaining further fame. He also appeared on Sofiane's album Affranchis with the title "IDF" where he was featured. He remains signed to Sofiane's Affranchis Music record label.

His album En esprit was released in 2019 with the track "Khapta" featuring Sofiane reached number 1 on SNEP, the official French Singles Chart. Other collaborations include Soolking, Vald and Koba LaD.

== Discography ==
=== Albums ===
Title	Year	Peak positions			
Title	Year	FRA	BEL (Fl)	BEL (Wa)	SWI
En Esprit	2019	3	192	6	44
Horizon vertical (joint album with Vald)	2020	20	—	20	71
Chef d'orchestre	2023	3	—	42	—
LVDR	2024	—	—	17	—

=== Singles ===
==== As lead artist ====
Title	Year	Peak positions				Album
Title	Year	FRA	BEL (Fl)	BEL (Wa)	SWI	Album
"L'Addition" (featuring Vald)	2018	84	—	—	—	En Esprit
"L'enfoiré"	2018	29	—	12 (Ultratip*)	—	En Esprit
"Les méchants"	2018	9	—	12 (Ultratip*)	—	En Esprit
"Khapta" (featuring Sofiane)	2019	1	—	16	—	En Esprit
"BX Land partie 3"	2019	107	—	—	—	Non-album singles
"Moulaga" (with Jul)	2019	2	14 (Ultratip*)	13	42	Non-album singles
"BX Land 5"	2020	41	—	—	—	Non-album singles
"L'ancien"	2020	36	—	—	—	Non-album singles
"Guccissima" (with Vald)	2020	27	—	—	—	Horizon vertical (Heuss l'Enfoiré + Vald album)
"Gucci Versace" (with Kore)	2021	90	—	—	—	En Passant Pécho: Les Carottes Sont Cuites (soundtrack)
"BX Land 6"	2021	64	—	—	—	Non-album singles
"Saiyan" (and Gazo)	2023	2	—	8	53	Non-album singles
"Mélanine" (with Werenoi)	2024	3	—	29	—	Non-album singles

*Did not appear in the official Belgian Ultratop 50 charts, but rather in the bubbling under Ultratip charts.

==== As featured artist ====
Title	Year	Peak positions				Album
Title	Year	FRA	BEL (Fl)	BEL (Wa)	SWI	Album
"IDF" (Sofiane featuring Heuss l'Enfoiré)	2018	49	—	—	—	Affranchis (Sofiane album)
"Woah" (Sofiane featuring Vald, Mac Tyer, Soolking, Kalash Criminel, Sadek and Heuss L'Enfoiré)	2018	7	—	12 (Ultratip*)	—	93 Empire
"Même secteur" (Hornet La Frappe featuring Heuss l'Enfoiré)	2018	43	—	—	—	Dans les yeux (Hornet La Frappe album)
"Tikka" (Lartiste featuring Heuss l'Enfoiré)	2019	91	—	—	—	Quartier Latin Vol.1 (Lartiste album)
"Moula" (Niska featuring Heuss l'Enfoiré)	2019	9	—	—	—	Mr Sal (Niska album)
"Rapelle-toi" (Naps featuring Heuss l'Enfoiré)	2019	25	—	32 (Ultratip*)	—	On est fait pour ça (Naps album)
"Dans mon délire" (Black M featuring Heuss l'Enfoiré)	2019	138	—	15	—	Il était une fois... (Black M album)
"Ne reviens pas" (Gradur featuring Heuss l'Enfoiré)	2019	1	6 (Ultratip*)	2	21	Zone 59 (Gradur album)
"Super Silver Haze" (SCH featuring Heuss l'Enfoiré)	2019	93	—	—	—	Rooftop (SCH album)
"Dans l'espace"	2020	1	—	15	28	Non-album single
"Centre commercial" (Ninho featuring Heuss l'Enfoiré)	2020	9	—	—	—	M.I.L.S 3 (Ninho album)
"La Kichta" (Soolking featuring Heuss l'Enfoiré)	2020	47	—	—	—	Vintage (Soolking album)
"Wesh" (GLK featuring Heuss l'Enfoiré)	2020	43	—	—	—	Non-album single
"Moula max" (L'Algérino featuring Heuss l'Enfoiré)	2020	64	—	—	—	Non-album single
"La musique est bonne" (Naza featuring Heuss l'Enfoiré)	2020	97	—	—	—	Non-album single
"Chandon et Moët" (PLK featuring Heuss l'Enfoiré)	2020	10	—	—	—	Enna (PLK album)
"Symphonie du bendo" (Naza featuring Heuss l'Enfoiré)	2020	68	—	—	—	Gros bébé (Naza album)
"Sicario" (Gims featuring Heuss l'Enfoiré)	2020	32	—	—	—	Le Fléau (Gims album)
"Adriano" (Brulux featuring Heuss l'Enfoiré)	2021	132	—	—	—	La sans pitax (Brulux album)
"Kalitada" (Unité featuring Heuss l'Enfoiré, Gazo and SLK)	2021	94	—	—	—	Non-album single

*Did not appear in the official Belgian Ultratop 50 charts, but rather in the bubbling under Ultratip charts.

=== Other charted songs ===
Title	Year	Peak positions		Album
Title	Year	FRA	BEL (Wa)	Album
"George Moula" (feat. Koba LaD)	2019	21	21 (Ultratip*)	En Esprit
"Benda" (feat. Soolking)	2019	23	—	En Esprit
"Aristocrate"	2019	35	5 (Ultratip*)	En Esprit
"Hakan Sukur"	2019	40	—	En Esprit
"G.M.T.B"	2019	41	—	En Esprit
"SKCH"	2019	49	—	En Esprit
"BX Land 4"	2019	50	—	En Esprit
"En esprit"	2019	53	—	En Esprit
"Anita"	2019	63	—	En Esprit
"N.Y.M.A"	2019	93	—	En Esprit
"Léger"	2019	96	—	En Esprit
"Canada" (with Vald)	2020	16	—	Horizon vertical (Heuss l'Enfoiré + Vald album)
"Matrixé" (with Vald)	2020	33	—	Horizon vertical (Heuss l'Enfoiré + Vald album)
"Mauvais" (with Vald)	2020	71	—	Horizon vertical (Heuss l'Enfoiré + Vald album)
"Mélange" (with Vald)	2020	78	—	Horizon vertical (Heuss l'Enfoiré + Vald album)
"Royal Cheese" (with Vald)	2020	85	—	Horizon vertical (Heuss l'Enfoiré + Vald album)
"Horizon vertical" (with Vald)	2020	88	—	Horizon vertical (Heuss l'Enfoiré + Vald album)
"1992" (with Vald)	2020	120	—	Horizon vertical (Heuss l'Enfoiré + Vald album)
"Diviser pour mieux régner" (with Vald)	2020	127	—	Horizon vertical (Heuss l'Enfoiré + Vald album)
"VHR" (with Vald)	2020	140	—	Horizon vertical (Heuss l'Enfoiré + Vald album)
"2014" (with Vald)	2020	163	—	Horizon vertical (Heuss l'Enfoiré + Vald album)
"Adios" (with Vald)	2020	167	—	Horizon vertical (Heuss l'Enfoiré + Vald album)
"Ola Ola Ola" (with Bosh)	2021	10	—	No Limit (Compilation album)
"Mal à la tête" (4.4.2 - Soolking X Heuss l'Enfoirée)	2021	10	—	Non-album release
"La Marseillaise" (with Ninho)	2022	27	—	Non-album release

*Did not appear in the official Belgian Ultratop 50 charts, but rather in the bubbling under Ultratip charts.
