= Nᵒ5 on Tour =

Nº5 on Tour

Live album by Mylène Farmer
- Released: 7 December 2009
- Recorded: France
- Genre: Pop, rock, electropop

Mylène Farmer chronology
| Point de suture (2008) | Nº5 on Tour (2009) | Bleu noir (2010) |

Singles from Nº5 on Tour
- 1. "C'est dans l'air (live)" Released: December 2009; 2. "Paradis inanimé (live)" Released: April 2010

Professional ratings
Review scores
| Source | Rating |
|---|---|
| Allmusic | 4/5 stars |
| Closer | 4/4 stars |
| Deuzio | 4/5 stars |
| La Presse | 4/4 stars |

Nº5 on Tour is a double live album by French singer Mylène Farmer which documents her 2009 tour Mylène Farmer en tournée. It is her fifth live album and her 15th album overall. It was released on 7 December 2009, and it includes the standard set list that she sang during the indoor shows in France. Initial reports proclaimed "Libertine" was going to be the first single, however that was proven wrong with the official report. The DVD of the tour was released in April 2010 and documents the outdoor shows that took place at the Stade de France, in Paris, on 12 September 2009. Surprisingly, the live version of the fourth single from the album Point de suture, "C'est dans l'air", was officially announced as the first single from the live album, on 26 November 2009. The next single was "Paradis inanimé".

For the first time throughout the singer's career, the film of the concert, entitled "Mylène Farmer au Stade de France", was screened at the cinema. It was broadcast on 11 April 2010 at 8.30 pm in 19 cinemas in France.

For the first time, the DVD was released in Canada, on 4 May, after being officially screened by DEP / Universal Music Canada in Montréal one day earlier. The DVD was also available in Belgium (13 April), in Poland (23 April).

== Critical reception ==
=== CD ===
Critical reception was very positive. France Soir stated: "Big hits, laughters, tears, shouts, "I love you"... Nothing is missing from this double CD. (...) Mylène Farmer offers her public a dynamic live performance, mixed with vocal cracks and even wrong notes. And it's good!" Voici said the album is "the singer's best live album since Live à Bercy in 1996". According to Vacarm, this album "reflects comprehensively the worked up atmosphere of concerts". However, it criticized "the lack of authenticity" on some songs and the "intrusion of the redundant and predictable "Rêver"", but said that "the sound is huge and rearranged, the public rather mixed down, and Mylène Farmer's slight vocal imperfections are, for once, not removed".

The album entered the French Albums Chart at number one and the digital chart at number four on 12 December 2009. In the second week it dropped to number three and totalled four non-consecutive weeks in the top 10. Then it dropped very quickly, and fell out of the top 100 after 13 weeks, but jumped at number 23 in April 2010 when the DVD was released. This chart performance is quite better than the previous live album's one. It also debuted at number one in Belgium and number 14 in Switzerland. It reached number six in its second week in Russia.

=== DVD / Blu-ray ===
The DVD / Blu-ray release was promoted on 16 April 2010 on the French television channel TF1 in a 20-second advertisement composed of various images from the concert. Universal Music announced that over 250,000 copies were placed in stores. The DVD / Blu-ray received positive reviews from critics and in the media. For example, Le Matin said "the film renders perfectly the atmosphere of the arena of Paris". Télé 2 Semaines stated it is "a beautiful recording, (...) everything is almost perfect". Télé Moustique criticized the techno arrangements deemed as a bit outdated, but praised the lighting arrangements. Canadian magazine Canoë 7 Jours gave a mixed review, saying "multimedia projections and other decorations go to oblivion" and criticized the amplification of the basses. Les Années Laser said the Blu-ray is "quite live up to expectation". Canadian newspaper La Presse described the DVD, as "so special and so successful", notably thanks to the "extraordinary and true communion between the crowd and the artist, captured by the cameras". What Hi-Fi ? Son & Home Cinéma gave a mixed review: it reproaches the lack of surprise (choreographies, stage set, choice of songs...), but said that the "show is great".

The DVD went straight to number one on the chart, selling 98,177 units in the first week, reaching immediately diamond status. It remained for other seven weeks atop. The DVD was also number one in Belgium (Wallonia) for six weeks, Switzerland for four weeks, Russia and number three in Quebec.

== Track listings ==
=== CDs ===
Disc one
| No. | Title | Lyrics | Music | Original album | Length |
|---|---|---|---|---|---|
| 1. | "D'entre les morts" | | Laurent Boutonnat | - | 4:33 |
| 2. | "Paradis inanimé" | Farmer | Boutonnat | Point de suture | 4:43 |
| 3. | "L'Âme-stram-gram" | Farmer | Boutonnat | Innamoramento | 5:27 |
| 4. | "Je m'ennuie" | Farmer | Boutonnat | Point de suture | 4:26 |
| 5. | "Appelle mon numéro" | Farmer | Boutonnat | Point de suture | 7:10 |
| 6. | "XXL" | Farmer | Boutonnat | Anamorphosée | 4:30 |
| 7. | "À quoi je sers..." | Farmer | Boutonnat | - | 5:07 |
| 8. | "Pourvu qu'elles soient douces" | Farmer | Boutonnat | Ainsi soit je... | 5:02 |
| 9. | "Point de suture" | Farmer | Boutonnat | Point de suture | 7:06 |
| 10. | "Nous souviendrons-nous" | Farmer | Boutonnat | L'autre... | 5:36 |
| 11. | "Rêver" | Farmer | Boutonnat | Anamorphosée | 5:22 |
| 12. | "Ainsi soit je..." | Farmer | Boutonnat | Ainsi soit je... | 4:18 |
| 13. | "Interlude "Avant que l'ombre..." | Farmer | Boutonnat | Avant que l'ombre... | 4:13 |

Disc one
| No. | Title | Lyrics | Music | Original album | Length |
|---|---|---|---|---|---|
| 1. | "Libertine"" | Laurent Boutonnat | Jean-Claude Dequéant | Cendres de lune | 5:35 |
| 2. | "Sans contrefaçon" | Mylène Farmer | Boutonnat | Ainsi soit je... | 4:09 |
| 3. | "Je te rends ton amour" | Farmer | Boutonnat | Innamoramento | 5:28 |
| 4. | "Dégénération" | Farmer | Boutonnat | Point de suture | 6:58 |
| 5. | "Désenchantée" | Farmer | Boutonnat | L'autre... | 7:42 |
| 6. | "C'est dans l'air" | Farmer | Boutonnat | Point de suture | 6:08 |
| 7. | "Si j'avais au moins..." | Farmer | Boutonnat | Point de suture | 7:18 |

- Teaser Mylène Farmer au Stade de France — 2:45 (on book disc and collector edition - DVD Bonus)

Bonus of the "Stade de France" (collector edition)

1. "California" — 5:20
2. "L'Instant X" — 4:58
3. "Fuck Them All" — 4:57

=== DVD / Blu-ray ===
DVD - Stade de France

1. "Avant la lumière" (1:07)
2. "D'entre les morts" (4:55)
3. "Paradis inanimé" (4:42)
4. "L'Âme-stram-gram" (6:16)
5. "Je m'ennuie" (4:24)
6. Outro Haka "Je m'ennuie" (2:42)
7. "Appelle mon numéro" (5:19)
8. "XXL" (6:06)
9. "California" (4:59)
10. "Pourvu qu'elles soient douces" (4:58)
11. "Point de Suture" (7:50)
12. "Nous souviendrons-nous" (6:17)
13. "Rêver" (8:52)
14. "Laisse le vent emporter tout" (5:22)
15. "Ainsi soit je..." (6:09)
16. Interlude "Avant que l'ombre..." (5:31)
17. "Libertine" (5:33)
18. "Sans contrefaçon" (6:06)
19. "L'Instant X" (4:55)
20. "Fuck Them All" (4:52)
21. "Dégénération" (7:27)
22. "C'est dans l'air" (8:05)
23. "Désenchantée" (10:41)
24. "Générique" (6:05)

Bonus

1. "Ecorchée vive - Création des costumes", interview with Jean-Paul Gaultier — 11:20
2. "Body Art - Préparation physique", interview with Hervé Lewis — 4:33
3. "Le rayon vert - Création des lumières", interview with Dimitri Vassiliu — 10:13
4. "Derrière les fenêtres - Création des images de scène", interview with Alain Escalle — 14:18
5. "L'espirit du pas - Chorégraphies et danseurs", interview with Christophe Danchaud and Nataly Aveillan — 24:10
6. "Ondes de choc - Musique et son", interview with Yvan Cassar, Stéphane Plission, Jérôme Devoise and Karen Nimereala — 19:24
7. "Time laps - Les coulisses du Stade de France" — 12:00

Bonus of the collector edition

1. "À quoi je sers..." (5:08)
2. "Je te rends ton amour" (5:31)
3. Final indoor : "Si j'avais au moins..." (7:04)

== Album charts ==
=== Weekly charts ===
| Chart (2009) | Peak position |
|---|---|
| Belgian Albums (Ultratop Flanders) | 99 |
| Belgian Albums (Ultratop Wallonia) | 1 |
| European Albums (Top 100) | 13 |
| French Albums (SNEP) | 1 |
| Russian Albums (2M) | 6 |
| Swiss Albums (Schweizer Hitparade) | 14 |
| Swiss Albums (Schweizer Hitparade Romandy) | 10 |

=== Year-end charts ===
| Chart (2009) | Position |
|---|---|
| French Albums (SNEP) | 29 |
| Chart (2010) | Position |
| Belgian Albums (Ultratop Wallonia) | 28 |
| French Albums (SNEP) | 94 |

== DVD charts ==
=== Weekly charts ===
| Chart (2010) | Peak position |
|---|---|
| Belgian DVDs (Ultratop Flanders) | 3 |
| Belgian DVDs (Ultratop Wallonia) | 1 |
| Dutch DVDs (MegaCharts) | 22 |
| French Music DVD (SNEP) | 1 |
| Swiss Music DVD (Schweizer Hitparade) | 1 |

=== Year-end charts ===
| Chart (2010) | Position |
|---|---|
| Belgian DVDs (Ultratop Flanders) | 40 |
| Belgian DVDs (Ultratop Wallonia) | 1 |
| French DVDs (SNEP) | 2 |
| Russian DVDs (2M) | 3 |
| Chart (2011) | Position |
| Belgian DVDs (Ultratop Wallonia) | 18 |
| French DVDs (SNEP) | 24 |
| Chart (2012) | Position |
| French DVDs (SNEP) | 34 |

== Certifications and sales ==
| Region | Certification | Certified units/sales |
Album
| Belgium (BRMA) | Gold | 15,000^{*} |
| France (SNEP) | 2× Platinum | 200,000^{*} |
DVD
| Belgium (BRMA) | Gold | 25,000^{*} |
| France (SNEP) | Diamond | 60,000^{*} |
^{*} Sales figures based on certification alone.

== Formats ==
Audio

- Double CD
- Double CD — Book Disc (Book of 32 pages, CD-ROM with the teaser "Mylene Farmer au Stade de France")
- Triple vinyl LP
- iTunes Store digital download, including a digital booklet

Audio & Video

- Collector edition (Double CD + DVD Bonus) - Limited edition
