= NI (album) =

Studio album by Ninho
- Released: 30 June 2023
- Recorded: 2022–2023
- Genre: French hip hop
- Length: 56:00
- Labels: Rec. 118; Jefe Productions
- Producers: Aldaz; Baki; BBP; BK Music; Boumidjal; D-Way Beatz; Daimo Beats; Dorian; Dvgz; Gabbi; Hoodstar; HoloMobb; Hufel; Kary; Le Marabout; Leveatz; Manu Manu; Nostra Beats; P2wider; PSK; Sam H.; Shayaa; Shiruken Music; Str8cash; SVOnTheBeat; Traplysse; TripleNBeat

Ninho chronology
Jefe (2021)	NI (2023)	GOAT (2024)

Singles from NI
- 1. "25 G" Released: 7 June 2023

NI is the fourth album by the French rapper Ninho, released on 30 June 2023 through Rec. 118 and Jefe Production. The album features guest appearances from the American rapper Lil Baby, the British rapper Central Cee, and the Nigerian singers Omah Lay and Ayra Starr. NI combines Ninho’s melodic trap with Afropop and UK rap. A deluxe edition with five additional tracks, titled NI (Extension), was released on 7 July 2023. The album debuted at number one on the French Albums Chart with 37,116 equivalent album units sold in its first week. It also peaked at number two in Switzerland and number one in Belgium (Wallonia). NI became the fastest album in France to reach Platinum status in 2023, and was certified triple Platinum by the SNEP in September 2025.

== Background and release ==
On 5 June 2023, Ninho announced his fourth album as NI, releasing its lead single, "25 G", two days later through Rec. 118 and Warner Music France. The album’s full tracklist was revealed on 27 June 2023, confirming guest contributions from Central Cee, Lil Baby, Omah Lay, and Ayra Starr.

A private album listening party was held on 28 June 2023 at La Seine Musicale in Boulogne-Billancourt. The event attracted more than 6,000 attendees, during which Ninho performed selections from the project for approximately forty minutes and previewed the album’s concept and collaborations. The standard edition of NI was released on 30 June 2023 in digital and physical formats, including limited-edition vinyl pressings and merchandising collaborations with his clothing line NI. NI (Extension) followed on 7 July 2023, adding five new tracks to the original sequence and extending the runtime to 73 minutes. The reissue was released only one week after the standard album.

== Composition and themes ==
Charts in France wrote that the album moves away from his usual style, shifting to slower tempos and "favouring atmosphere" while incorporating world genres such as UK rap and Nigerian Afrobeat, possibly signalling his wish to become an international star. Rap City highlighted Ninho’s use of punchlines and wordplay.

== Commercial performance ==
NI debuted at number one on the French Albums Chart, becoming Ninho’s fourth chart-topping album in France. First week sales totalled 37,116 album-equivalent units, including 30,046 streaming-equivalent units, 6,658 physical sales and 412 digital downloads. On 21 August 2023 the album was certified Platinum by SNEP.

NI stayed on French charts for 110 weeks, eventually receiving a triple Platinum certificatio on 4 September 2025. The single "No Love", a collaboration with Ayra Starr, was also certified Diamond in France, and earned a Gold certification in Switzerland. In Belgium (Wallonia), NI debuted at number one and spent 96 weeks on the Ultratop Albums chart, becoming one of the region’s most stable francophone rap releases of its cycle. It also charted in Flanders, peaking at number twenty-seven. In Switzerland, the album debuted at number two on the Schweizer Hitparade, spending 13 weeks on the chart.

== Track listing ==
NI standard edition track listing
No.	Title	Writer(s)	Producer(s)	Length
1.	"La vie de Johnny"	William Nzobazola	Sam H.	3:27
2.	"Yo moko oyebi"	Nzobazola	BBP	3:41
3.	"Rich Porter"	Nzobazola	Shayaa; Str8cash; Aldaz	3:23
4.	"Blue Story" (featuring Lil Baby)	Nzobazola; Dominique Armani Jones	Shayaa; PSK	4:18
5.	"Edouard Nahum"	Nzobazola	Shayaa	3:07
6.	"25 G"	Nzobazola	SVOnTheBeat	4:10
7.	"Respect"	Nzobazola	Nostra Beats	3:18
8.	"Branché sur snap"	Nzobazola	Boumidjal; HoloMobb	3:29
9.	"Bad" (featuring Omah Lay)	Nzobazola; Stanley Omah Didia	Le Marabout; D-Way Beatz	3:46
10.	"Dans la peau"	Nzobazola	Shiruken Music	3:09
11.	"No Love" (featuring Ayra Starr)	Nzobazola; Sarah Oyinkansola Aderibigbe	Manu Manu; Leveatz	3:22
12.	"Eurostar" (featuring Central Cee)	Nzobazola; Oakley Neil Caesar-Su	Boumidjal; HoloMobb	3:07
13.	"Chiraq"	Nzobazola	BK Music; TripleNBeat; Gabbi	4:26
14.	"Plus qu'eux"	Nzobazola	p2wider; Daimo Beats	3:29
15.	"Bon qu'à ça"	Nzobazola	Shayaa; Traplysse	2:49
16.	"Grands ensembles"	Nzobazola	Hufel; P2WIDER	3:38
Total length:				56:00

== NI (Extension) ==
The deluxe edition NI (Extension) added five songs. The material was produced by Gabbi, TripleNBeat, Kary, Baki, Dorian, Hoodstar and Dvgz.

NI Extension deluxe edition bonus tracks
No.	Title	Writer(s)	Producer(s)	Length
17.	"Griot"	Nzobazola; Gabbi; TripleNBeat	Gabbi; TripleNBeat	2:42
18.	"Mode S Plus"	Nzobazola; Gabbi; Kary; TripleNBeat	Gabbi; Kary; TripleNBeat	3:14
19.	"Vinicius"	Nzobazola; Baki; Dorian; Gabbi	Baki; Dorian; Gabbi	3:12
20.	"Signes de gang"	Nzobazola; Hoodstar	Hoodstar	3:21
21.	"Christopher Wallace"	Nzobazola; Dvgz	Dvgz	4:17
Total length:				16:46

== Charts ==
Weekly chart performance for Ni
Chart (2023)	Peak position
Belgium Albums (Ultratop Flanders)	1
Belgium Albums (Ultratop Wallonia)	27
French Albums (SNEP)	1
Swiss Albums (Schweizer Hitparade)	2
