= Jefe (album) =

Studio album by Ninho
- Released: 3 December 2021
- Length: 51:03
- Language: French
- Label: Warner Music France; Rec. 118
- Producer: Fabrice Landry

Ninho chronology
M.I.L.S 3.0 (2020)	Jefe (2021)	NI (2023)

Jefe (Spanish pronunciation: [ˈxefe]; transl. Boss) is the third studio album by French rapper Ninho, released on 3 December 2021 through Warner Music France and Rec. 118.

In promotion of the album, the rapper will kick off a 19-date tour through France, Switzerland and Belgium in 2022, starting in Grenoble on 15 April 2022.

== Background and composition ==
The album is described as a "voyage" through the rapper's success story. In an interview with AFP, he explained that people never really know the former life and the hardships of a man that makes it big. He said that no one ever knows the beginning of the story, comparing it to looking at a completed house while dismissing the fundaments. For the first time, he decided not to include any guest appearances on a studio album. He explained his decision by saying that he could have achieved cross-over success in other countries by including features but eventually decided to take the risk and release a solo album. Prior to its release, it was rumoured that American rapper Cardi B would appear on the album but plans were scrapped due to her pregnancy.

Sonically, the album offers a blend of danceable pop sounds and pure rap songs. Some songs were interpreted as a nod to Raï, a form of Algerian folk music.

== Commercial performance ==
Jefe debuted at number one in France, moving 66,865 total units in its first week, 9,676 of which were physical sales. This marks the second-biggest opening week in France in 2021, only behind Orelsan's Civilisation. Elsewhere, the record reached number 12 in Flanders and number two in Wallonia.

== Track listing ==
All tracks produced by Fabrice Landry.

Jefe track listing
No.	Title	Writer(s)	Length
1.	"Intro"	William Nzobazola; Kozbeatz	3:01
2.	"Jefe"	Nzobazola; Therapy	2:57
3.	"VVS"	Nzobazola; Young Ko	3:07
4.	"Sky Priority"	Nzobazola; BBP	2:49
5.	"OG"	Nzobazola; Lil Ben	3:47
6.	"Arme de poing"	Nzobazola; SNK; Young Ko	3:35
7.	"Vérité"	Nzobazola; Daimo	3:19
8.	"No Life"	Nzobazola; Artro	3:57
9.	"RER D"	Nzobazola; Voluptyk	3:43
10.	"YSL"	Nzobazola; Young Ko	3:38
11.	"Aïcha"	Nzobazola; Hoodstar Beatz; Young Ko	3:39
12.	"Mood"	Nzobazola; Kubix; LVDR	2:53
13.	"Athéna"	Nzobazola; Daimo	3:16
14.	"La maison que je voulais"	Nzobazola; AniBeatz	3:41
15.	"Outro"	Nzobazola; Daimo	3:35
Total length:			51:03

== Charts ==
=== Weekly charts ===
Weekly chart performance for Jefe
Chart (2021–2022)	Peak position
Belgian Albums (Ultratop Flanders)	12
Belgian Albums (Ultratop Wallonia)	1
Canadian Albums (Billboard)	52
French Albums (SNEP)	1
Swiss Albums (Schweizer Hitparade)	4

=== Year-end charts ===
2021 year-end chart performance for Jefe
Chart (2021)	Position
Belgian Albums (Ultratop Wallonia)	32
French Albums (SNEP)	14
Swiss Albums (Schweizer Hitparade)	75

2022 year-end chart performance for Jefe
Chart (2022)	Position
Belgian Albums (Ultratop Wallonia)	4
French Albums (SNEP)	2
Swiss Albums (Schweizer Hitparade)	19

2023 year-end chart performance for Jefe
Chart (2023)	Position
Belgian Albums (Ultratop Wallonia)	22
French Albums (SNEP)	24

== Certifications ==
Certifications for Jefe
Region	Certification	Certified units/sales
France (SNEP)	Diamond	500,000^{‡}
Switzerland (IFPI Switzerland)	Platinum	20,000^{‡}
^{‡} Sales+streaming figures based on certification alone.
