= Appelle mon numéro =

Single by Mylène Farmer

from the album Point de Suture
- B-side: Instrumental (CD single); Remix (CD maxi)
- Released: 3 November 2008
- Recorded: Brussel (Belgium), 2008
- Genre: Electropop, pop rock
- Length: 5:30
- Label: Polydor, Universal Music
- Songwriters: Lyrics: Mylène Farmer; Music: Laurent Boutonnat
- Producer: Laurent Boutonnat

Mylène Farmer singles chronology
"Dégénération" (2008)	"Appelle mon numéro" (2008)	"Si j'avais au moins..." (2009)

"Appelle mon numéro" (English: "Call/dial My Number") is a 2008 song recorded by French singer Mylène Farmer. Released on 3 November 2008, it was the second single from her seventh studio album, Point de Suture. It received generally positive reviews from critics and was more aired on radio and television than Farmer's previous single, "Dégénération". In France, the single allowed Farmer to establish a new record: to obtain a sixth number-one hit.

== Background and release ==
In late August 2008, when Point de Suture was available digitally, several sites announced "Appelle mon numéro" as the singer's next single from her album, but often presented as a probability. However, this information was not officially confirmed before 12 September 2008. That day, a promotional format was sent to the radio stations which began to broadcast the radio edit version.

On 9 October, Cede.ch site announced the date of release – 3 November 2008 – and two formats that would be available – two CD maxi. Two days later, Amazon.fr and Alapage.com revealed other two formats: a CD single, a digipack CD maxi and a vinyl. The cover art of the CD maxi was shown on 19 October 2008, and those of the CD single on 21 October.

== Music and lyrics ==
This "pop ballad" uses an acoustic guitar. The psychologist Hugues Royer said the song is naughty and speaks of love on the phone, Farmer hoping that her lover came to share her privacy. He said that the lyrics "my most beautiful gesture" is for the singer "the act of placing her head on the pillow, and that this privilege is reserved for the person who "enters the history", i.e. that of the singer".

== Music video ==
On 8 October, some media revealed that the music video was shot on 4 and 5 October in the studios of Saint-Ouen, Seine-Saint-Denis, France. This video was scheduled to be broadcast on television on 22 October but, according to Polydor, it could be delayed on 29 October if the assembly is not finished. It was directed by Benoît Di Sabatino, the singer's companion, who had also produced the music videos for "C'est une belle journée", "L'amour n'est rien..." and "Drôle de creepie" (for Lisa). The first images were shown on the Internet on 17 October 2008 and the full video was eventually available on the Internet and on television on 22 October. It was elected "Video of the month" of November 2008 on the radio Radio Jeunes Reims. On 17 November 2008, the video was available digitally on the official sites of download.

The video has no screenplay and uses the radio edit version of the song. In it, the singer is lying on a huge white bed, while four way of colors illustrating the four seasons are shown (dead leaves, rain, snow, sun). In each of them, Farmer wears different clothes, and has successively in her hands a crystal ball, a pillow, a telephone, a shoe that she repairs while wearing round glasses, an umbrella. The video ends in the same way it began, i.e. showing the singer being asleep.

The video was generally well received by the media. Virgin site said the clip is "fresh and colorful", and expresses "the naughty and the childhood side of the artist". According to Obiwi, the video is "sweet and paradisiac" and "we would believe it was taken from a fairy's tale". For Musique.evous, Farmer seems surprisingly "happy" in this video which "shows the red icon in a new light". However, Plurielles said the video, "full of thoughtlessness", was not appreciated by all the singer's fans, adding that it shows Farmer "as a child woman, a little candid". However, the video was diversely appreciated by the singers' fans: some of them liked the freshness, the colors and the fact that Farmer was smiling in the video, others considered that there was a lack of inspiration.

== Critical reception ==
The song was generally well received by the critics. According to La Meuse, this song will "win over the public". Télé Moustique said that "Appelle mon numéro" is "an stubborning song whose freshness makes almost forget the refrain". For Cité Gay, the song is "rather pleasant, [but] does not give an irrepressible desire to replay without delay". For Le Petit Journal, the song is "a solid, tenderly naughty and very catchy composition". Backchichinfo stated: ""Appelle mon numéro" holds the attention, with an effective verse and a certain general freshness." According to Royer, the song demonstrates a sense of "indolent humor" and is "musically successful".

However, there were sometimes mixed reviews by the media and Farmer's fans. For example, Hit Muse Mag stated: ""Appelle mon numéro" [has] a minimalist text. The detractors of Mylène who had blamed her for an outdated expression and for a pretentious vocabulary are fulfilled... The poor melody is easy to remember. We wonder if, due to having dug the abysses of a black and painful poetry, Mylène Farmer did not use her lexical field preferred up to the rope." Le Matin deemed that with this song, "Farmer almost reaches the limits of the easiness : kind melody, simple lyrics". Similarly, French author Julien Rigal said the song has "disappointing lyrics".

== Chart performance ==
On 8 November 2008, the single entered the French Singles Chart at number one, selling 16,236 units, thus becoming Farmer's sixth number-one single in France, which was at the time the new record for an artist on the SNEP Singles Chart. The following week, it dropped to number three, with 5,376 sales (−66%), and continued to drop, re-gained a few places during Christmas, then dropped slowly out of the top 50. It totaled five weeks in the top ten, 21 weeks in the top 50 and 36 weeks in the top 100. "Appelle mon numéro" also entered the digital chart at number 22 on 8 November 2008, then dropped and fell off the top 50 after eight weeks.

The single started at number 12 on the Ultratop 40 in Belgium (Wallonia), on 15 November 2008, then peaked at number seven seven weeks later, and remained in the top 40 for 14 weeks. In Switzerland, it debuted at number 53 on 16 November 2008, then dropped to number 89 and fell off the chart.

In France, the single was much aired on radio than "Dégénération". It reached number 38 in its fourth week on the airplay chart. The video reached number 13 on the Muzicast television chart in its second week, while the single peaked at number 42 on the club chart in its fifth week, on 4 December 2008. The song was much aired in Ukraine, Lithuania and Russia, reaching number 16 in Moscow and 19 in St. Petersburg in 2008 and 2009, and hit number 98 in the whole country in 2010.

== Promotion and live performances ==
The song was actively promoted on TF1: two advertisements, respectively of 20 and 30 seconds, were broadcast from the late October to the early November, then a 1:30 teaser in early December 2008. Mylène Farmer performed the song in lip sync on 13 December 2008, on France 2, on the TV show Ça ne finira jamais, devoted to Johnny Hallyday. On this occasion, the singer was sitting near a window and was dressed as on the single cover, plus few rings with skulls at her fingers. The song was also performed during the 2009 tour: at this point, Farmer wore a glittering short dress with red cape with hood and the stage became pink. The introduction being very different from the album version, the first notes of the song are unrecognizable.

== Formats and track listings ==
These are the formats and track listings of single releases of "Appelle mon numéro":

- CD single

No.	Title	Length
1.	"Appelle mon numéro" (single version)	5:32
2.	"Appelle mon numéro" (instrumental)	5:32

- CD maxi – Digipack

No.	Title	Length
1.	"Appelle mon numéro" (single version)	5:32
2.	"Appelle mon numéro" (Greg B. remix)	5:56
3.	"Appelle mon numéro" (Manhattan Clique remix)	7:33
4.	"Appelle mon numéro" (MHC Star 69 remix)	4:15

- 12" maxi

No.	Title	Length
1.	"Appelle mon numéro" (single version)	5:32
2.	"Appelle mon numéro" (Greg B. remix)	5:56
3.	"Appelle mon numéro" (Manhattan Clique X directory dub)	6:39
4.	"Appelle mon numéro" (MHC Star 69 remix)	4:15

- Digital download

No.	Title	Length
1.	"Appelle mon numéro" (album version)	5:32
2.	"Appelle mon numéro" (instrumental)	5:32
3.	"Appelle mon numéro" (Greg B. remix)	5:58
4.	"Appelle mon numéro" (Manhattan Clique remix)	7:36
5.	"Appelle mon numéro" (MHC Star 69 remix)	4:13

- 12" maxi – Promo – Remixes

No.	Title	Length
1.	"Appelle mon numéro" (Greg B. remix)	5:56
2.	"Appelle mon numéro" (Manhattan Clique X directory dub)	6:39

- CD single – Promo

No.	Title	Length
1.	"Appelle mon numéro" (radio edit)	4:10

- CD single – Promo – Club Remixes

No.	Title	Length
1.	"Appelle mon numéro" (Greg B. remix edit)	3:35
2.	"Appelle mon numéro" (Manhattan Clique club edit)	3:45

- CD maxi – Promo

No.	Title	Length
1.	"Appelle mon numéro" (Greg B. remix)	5:56
2.	"Appelle mon numéro" (Mahnattan Clique X directory dub)	6:39
3.	"Appelle mon numéro" (Manhattan Clique remix)	7:33
4.	"Appelle mon numéro" (MHC Star 69 remix)	4:15
5.	"Appelle mon numéro" (single version)	5:32

== Official versions ==
Version	Length	Album	Remixed by	Year	Comment
Album version	5:30	Point de Suture	—	2008	See the previous sections
Instrumental	5:32	—	—	2008	All the vocals are deleted.
Radio edit	4:13	—	—	2008	The second verse is shortened, the musical bridge and the last refrain are deleted. The song ends in fade out.
Music video	4:35	—	—	2008	Similar to the radio edit version, this version doesn't end in fade out.
Greg B. remix	5:57	—	Greg B.	2008	After a 1:30 musical introduction in which only words 'Appelle mon numéro' are repeated, this dance / techno version contains only lyrics from the refrains. After the first four minutes, many 'la la la la', 'appelle-moi' and 'appelle mon numéro' are repeated and the song ends with a musical passage.
Greg B. remix edit	3:35	—	Greg B.	2008	
MHC Star 69 remix	4:15	—	Manhattan Clique	2008	This acoustic version contains the full lyrics. The musical bridge is shortened and the last two refrains are deleted.
Manhattan Clique remix	7:34	—	Manhattan Clique	2008	This techno version starts with a refrain and contains the full lyrics. The refrains are extended with many 'a... pelle mon numéro'.
Manhattan Clique X directory club	6:39	—	Manhattan Clique	2008	
Manhattan Clique club edit	3:45	—	Manhattan Clique	2008	
MHC disconnected remix	5:56	—	Manhattan Clique	2008	This version is only available collector mobil phone SFR Walkman Sony Ericsson
Music video	4:35	—	—	2008	This version is identical to the single version, but the musical bridge is shortened, the last refrain is deleted and the song does not end in fade out.
Live version (recorded in 2009)	7:10	N°5 on Tour	—	2009	This live version is similar to the album's one, but it starts with a musical interlude which lasts about 1:30.

== Credits ==
These are the credits and the personnel as they appear on the back of the single:

- Mylène Farmer – lyrics
- Laurent Boutonnat – music
- John Nollet /H&K – photo
- Henry Neu – design
- Isiaka – editions
- 2008 Stuffed Monkey
- Made in the E.U.

Manhattan Clique remix and Manhattan Clique-X directory dub

  - Manhattan Clique – remix, additional production
  - Philip Larsen, Chris Smith – keyboards

MHC Star69 remix

  - Manhattan Clique – remix, additional production
  - Philip Larsen – keyboards
  - Lee Turner – guitar

== Charts ==
=== Weekly charts ===
Weekly chart performance for "Appelle mon numéro"
Chart (2008–2009)	Peak position
Belgium (Ultratop 50 Wallonia)	7
CIS Airplay (TopHit)	87
France (SNEP)	1
French Digital Chart	22
Russia Airplay (TopHit)	23
Switzerland (Schweizer Hitparade)	53

=== Year-end charts ===
2008 year-end chart performance for "Appelle mon numéro"
Chart (2008)	Position
France (SNEP)	32

2009 year-end chart performance for "Appelle mon numéro"
Chart (2009)	Position
Belgium (Ultratop 50 Wallonia)	90
Eurochart Hot 100	78
France (SNEP)	100
Russia Airplay (TopHit)	61

2010 year-end chart performance for "Appelle mon numéro"
Chart (2010)	Position
Russia Airplay (TopHit)	156

== Release history ==
Region	Date	Format
Belgium, France, Switzerland	12 September 2008	Promo CD single, Promo 12", Promo CD maxi
Belgium, France, Switzerland	3 November 2008	CD single, CD maxi, 12" maxi
