= Si j'avais au moins... =

Single by Mylène Farmer

from the album Point de suture
- B-side: "Instrumental"
- Released: 16 February 2009
- Recorded: 2008
- Genre: Pop rock, soft rock
- Length: 5:31 (album version); 4:15 (radio edit)
- Label: Polydor, Universal Music
- Songwriters: Lyrics: Mylène Farmer; Music: Laurent Boutonnat
- Producer: Laurent Boutonnat

Mylène Farmer singles chronology
| "Appelle mon numéro" (2008) | "Si j'avais au moins..." (2009) | "C'est dans l'air" (2009) |

Music video
- "Si j'avais au moins..." on YouTube

"Si j'avais au moins..." ("If I Had at Least...") is a song recorded by French singer Mylène Farmer. This pop rock ballad was written by Farmer with music composed by Laurent Boutonnat. It was the third single released, from her seventh studio album Point de suture (2008), on 16 February 2009. Directed by Bruno Aveillan, the accompanying music video is the continuation of Farmer's previous single "Dégénération" and is the second and final part of a short film called The Farmer Project, broadcast in January 2009. In the video, the singer portrays a supernatural character who saves animals from testing and heals them. Although a survey showed that a minority of the voters wanted the song as the third single, "Si j'avais au moins..." received positive reviews and achieved some success on the French Singles Chart, debuting at number-one. Farmer performed the song on television during the NRJ Music Awards show on 17 January 2009 and on the 2009 Mylène Farmer en tournée tour.

== Background and release ==
On 15 December 2008, recording company Polydor officially announced that "Si j'avais au moins..." as the next single from the album Point de suture (2008) while simultaneously a promotional format was released on radio stations. This format contained a radio edit version, in which the last refrain of the original song, before the musical bridge, was deleted. Many fans were disappointed by this choice, as demonstrated by the results of a survey published on the website Mylene.net which showed that only 1.7% of the voters wanted the song as the third single. Charles Decant of Ozap deemed this release a "surprising decision" which recalled the choice of the ballad "Redonne-moi" as the third single from her previous album Avant que l'ombre... (2005). As the song has a very slow tempo, author Erwan Chuberre deemed that Farmer made "an artistic rather than a commercial choice" when she decided to release the song as a single.

On 15 January 2009, it was announced that the maxi vinyl, published in a limited edition, and the CD single would be released on 10 February, then delayed to 16 February. The cover art of the promotional single was entirely red, showing a close-up, the head of the doll which had appeared on Point de suture. The cover of the single, which published on the internet on 27 January 2009, displayed a photograph by Simon Hawk.

== Lyrics ==
According to the author Benoît Cachin, "Si j'avais au moins..." deals with the absence of a loved being, which causes an unbearable but trainer pain. Like in "Redonne-moi", the lyrics use the lexical field of a "ghost which haunts the singer's mind", include some references to religion and the neologism enténèbrement.

== Music video ==
The music video for "Si j'avais au moins..." used many special effects which show Farmer's supernatural powers to heal and release the animals.

Directed by Bruno Aveillan, the music video was filmed in mid-2008 in an abandoned hospital in Prague. It premiered on the internet on 7 January 2009, and was officially released on television on M6, ten days later. The music video was shot just after "Dégénération", the first single from Point de suture, as both music videos are parts of a short film named The Farmer Project.

The video starts with Farmer slowly walking in a laboratory in which many animals are captive to serve as experiments. Depicting a supernatural creature, the singer approaches every cage to look at all the animals – pigeons, cats, bobcats, rabbits, mouses, a snake, an owl, a monkey, a doe – and heals them with her magic hands. Then she takes a wounded little cat out of its cage and puts it on her shoulders. During the second refrain, she remains standing with closed eyes in the middle of the room and uses her supernatural powers to explode all of the glass cages. She thus releases the animals and, with a monkey in her arms, leads them outside into the woods. Standing in the forest, she closes her eyes again and sends many rays of light from her hands. The last scene shows the Earth being covered by that light.

According to Lionel Steketee, "Mylène [was] very professional, thorough, discreet and almost shy" when she participated in the shooting of the video. He said she had to be careful not to get scratched by the cat, and that the final scene was difficult to film because the cats were afraid of the water used in this scene, the rats remained hidden in a corner and the birds did not fly much. Given that the song deals with the pain caused by the absence of a dead person, the video is unrelated to the lyrics, as noted by author Alice Novak. In reviews, Yahoo! Music said that, through the video, "[Farmer] invites us into her dark and magical universe", and Premiere deemed it "mysterious, provocative". Considering it a short film, Cachin praised the music video as being "perfectly done".

== Critical reception ==
"Si j'avais au moins...", reviewed after the album's release, was generally well received in the media. Swiss newspaper Le Matin said it was a "magnific ballad" and one of the best songs of the album; as for Jason Birchmeier of Allmusic, he qualified "Si j'avais au moins..." and "Point de suture" as "standout ballads made of uplifting string arrangements and delicate vocal melodies". Novak deemed the song "sweet and sad". La Meuse considered it a "ballad with a strong lachrymal connotation".

== Chart performance ==
In France, "Si j'avais au moins..." charted poorly on radio, peaking at number 60 on the airplay chart in its second week, on 19 December 2008. In contrast, the music video was regularly broadcast on television, reaching number five on the TV airplay chart in its third week. On the singles chart, the song debuted at number one on the chart edition of 21 February 2009, selling 12,375 units that week, and thus became the singer's seventh number one single in France, which, at the time, was a record. The week after, the song ranked at number five, and weekly sales dropped to 3,072; thereafter, it continued to drop and remained 27 weeks in the top 50 and 38 weeks in the top 100, which remains the third longest chart trajectory of Farmer's single in France. In Belgium (Wallonia), the single entered the Ultratop 50 at number 25 on 28 February 2009, then dropped to number 38. In Switzerland, it charted for one week, at number 72, on 1 March 2009. The song began at a peak of number six on the chart edition of 7 March 2009 on the European Hot 100 Singles, which was the highest debut then.

== Live performances ==
Farmer performed the song during the NRJ Music Awards, broadcast on 17 January 2009, on TF1. She was dressed in white and was accompanied by many musicians. She lip-synced a recording of the song she had made the day before.

"Si j'avais au moins..." was performed as the last song during the 2009 tour, but only in the halls venues, and was cancelled for the concerts in stadiums. Farmer then wore a long white dress, and the stage was bathed in red and orange lights. During the refrain, many screens displayed images of lava expelled by a volcano during an eruption. The last musical bridge was extended while part of the staircase raised and showed a tunnel throughout which Farmer left the stage. In December 2009, Farmer officially released the live video of the song on the Internet, video which was not featured on the DVD and Blu-ray for N°5 on Tour; the instrumental version of the song, however, was used for the ending credits "Générique".

== Formats and track listings ==
The formats and track listings of single releases of "Si j'avais au moins...":

- CD single

| No. | Title | Length |
|---|---|---|
| 1. | "Si j'avais au moins..." (single version) | 5:31 |
| 2. | "Si j'avais au moins..." (instrumental version) | 5:31 |

- CD single – Promo

| No. | Title | Length |
|---|---|---|
| 1. | "Si j'avais au moins..." (radio edit) | 4:15 |

- 12″ maxi – Limited edition

| No. | Title | Length |
|---|---|---|
| 1. | "Si j'avais au moins..." (single version) | 5:31 |
| 2. | "Si j'avais au moins..." (instrumental version) | 5:31 |

- Digital download

| No. | Title | Length |
|---|---|---|
| 1. | "Si j'avais au moins..." (album version) | 5:31 |
| 2. | "Si j'avais au moins..." (instrumental version) | 5:31 |

== Credits ==
The credits and the personnel as they appear on the back of the single:

- Mylène Farmer – lyrics
- Laurent Boutonnat – music
- Isiaka – editions
- Simon Hawk / H&B – photo
- Henry Neu – design

== Charts and sales ==
=== Weekly charts ===
| Chart (2009) | Peak position |
|---|---|
| Belgium (Ultratop 50 Wallonia) | 25 |
| Europe (Eurochart Hot 100 Singles) | 6 |
| France (Airplay Chart) | 60 |
| France (SNEP) | 1 |
| Switzerland (Schweizer Hitparade) | 72 |

=== Year-end charts ===
| Chart (2009) | Position |
|---|---|
| Europe (Eurochart Hot 100 Singles) | 84 |
| France (SNEP) | 24 |

=== Sales ===
| Country | Certification | Physical sales |
|---|---|---|
| France | — | 45,000 |

== Release history ==
| Region | Date | Format |
|---|---|---|
| France, Belgium, Switzerland | 5 January 2009 | Promo CD single |
| France, Belgium, Switzerland | 16 February 2006 | CD single, vinyl |
