= C'est dans l'air =

Single by Mylène Farmer

from the album Point de suture
- B-side: "Remixes"
- Released: 27 April 2009
- Recorded: 2008
- Genre: EDM, House, Hi-NRG
- Length: 4:35 (album version); 3:35 (radio edit); 9:51(Tiësto remix)
- Label: Polydor, Universal Music
- Songwriters: Lyrics: Mylène Farmer; Music: Laurent Boutonnat
- Producer: Laurent Boutonnat

Mylène Farmer singles chronology
"Si j'avais au moins..." (2008)	"C'est dans l'air" (2009)	"Sextonik" (2009)

"C'est dans l'air" (English: "It's in the Air") is a 2008 electronic dance song recorded by French singer-songwriter Mylène Farmer. It is the fourth single from her seventh studio album Point de suture. The CD-single was released on 27 April 2009, followed by other formats one week later. Unlike Farmer's three previous singles, the song failed to enter at number one of the French Singles Chart, but topped the chart the week after, becoming Farmer's eighth number one single (and her fourth consecutive) in France. A live version of the song was also released, as the first single from Farmer's 2009 live album N°5 on Tour.

== Background and release ==
On 27 March 2009, the CD promo and the mp3 version were sent to the radio stations, and the song was officially announced as the fourth single from the album. The NRJ All French web radio station began to air a radio version of the song.

The track became a fan favourite and, according to a poll made on Mylene.net, most fans wanted this song as the third single instead of "Si j'avais au moins..."

On 10 April 2009, the cover artwork was revealed on Mylene.net. On 27 April, the CD single was released and all the versions were available digitally. The two CD maxi and the 12" were released on 4 May.

On 26 November 2009, it was announced that a live version of the song would be released as the first single from Farmer's 2009 live album N°5 on Tour.

== Lyrics and music ==
Farmer turns a noun into a verb in the refrain, "coïter", which does not exist in the French language. According to the psychologist Royer, the song contains touches of humour, especially in the verses in which the singer states in a deep voice "all the sins of the world". In this song which appears as "a form of apology for sin", the singer became "the spokeswoman of the misunderstoods and the madmen". According to the author Erwan Chuberre, the song is a "Dionysian hymn" which "exhorts us to transform our destiny", which sums up the philosophy of the album Point de suture.

== Music video ==
The music video was aired on television on 15 April 2009. Directed by 3D-animations designer Alain Escalle, it was shot in black and white, and shows Farmer dancing with skeletons in the background (Farmer's face becomes skeletal itself). Archival nuclear test footage is also used in the video, and at the end of the video the Earth is destroyed after a nuclear explosion.

The video received mixed reviews. It was sometimes accused of "feeding morbid obsessions or of shocking by simple taste for provocation". However, Chuberre considered the video as "direct and forceful" and complimented the "exciting and electric atmosphere" of Farmer's 2009 concerts. Chuberre also believes that the video provides "an universal truth: the destructive power at the center of this substance can destroy us, but can also help us to build."

The live music video by François Hanss was available on the Internet on 27 November and was composed of images from Farmer's concert at the Stade de France in Paris on 12 September 2009.

== Promotion and live performances ==
The song was never performed on television. It was sung during the 2009 tour: Farmer wore a black leather jacket with a golden cross in the back, and her dancers a beige jackets with a black cross in the back. They performed almost the same choreography as used in the music video, including some additional gestures. After the main part of the song, the musicians and dancers are presented on the screen above the stairs.

== Reception ==
=== Reviews ===
The song has a techno, minimalistic rhythm at first, evolving to more techno which resembles "Optimistique-moi". The style of the lyrics, however, may relate to "L'Instant X" and the universe of French artist Zazie, as there is a lot of satire and sarcasm. Lyrics laugh at the "lame" things in life, and then goes on to talk about breathing and necessity.

The song was criticized by some media, including City Gay. According to Libération, the song "uses a fairly impressive art of set language". Télé Moustique deemed the verses are composed of "thoughts that will not revolutionize the songwriting". By contrast, Le Nouvel Observateur qualified it as a "very dancing" song and Voici even stated it is "calibrated to make the deads dance". Musique Radio deemed the song is an "original" and "beautiful up-tempo song" which seems to be musically similar to "Dégénération".

=== Chart performance ===
The music video reached number seven on the television airplay chart in its third week, on 2 May 2009. It also debuted at its peak at number 48 on the club chart. The single went straight to number two on the singles chart, being unable to dislodge Magic System and Khaled's hit "Même pas fatigué !!!", then climbed to number one the next week thanks to the CD maxi and the vinyl sales, selling 16,631 units that week. It allowed Farmer to establish a new record: to rank eight singles at number-one in France. It was also the first time since "Les Mots" (2001), the duet with Seal, that a Farmer's single did not reach its peak position in its first week on the French singles chart. However, the following week, it dropped to number five but stayed in the Top Ten for eight weeks. The song debuted at a peak of number 26 on the digital chart and remained in the Top 50 for three weeks.

For the same reason, the single climbed to number 44 on 17 May 2009 on the Swiss Singles Chart, after a debut at number 88, then fell off the chart, but re-entered for a sole week after Farmer's concerts in Geneva in September 2009. The song also reached number seven in its second week on the Eurochart Hot 100 and entered the Ultratop 50 in Belgium at number thirteen on 16 May 2009.

== Formats and track listings ==
These are the formats and track listings of single releases of "C'est dans l'air":

=== First release ===
- CD single

No.	Title	Length
1.	"C'est dans l'air" (single version)	4:33
2.	"C'est dans l'air" (instrumental version)	4:33

- CD maxi 1

No.	Title	Length
1.	"C'est dans l'air" (single version)	4:33
2.	"C'est dans l'air" (Greg B. dance mix)	5:10
3.	"C'est dans l'air" (house club mix)	6:30
4.	"C'est dans l'air" (Fat Phaze remix)	6:10

- CD maxi 2

No.	Title	Length
1.	"C'est dans l'air" (extended club mix)	5:30
2.	"C'est dans l'air" (Greg B. remix)	6:00
3.	"C'est dans l'air" (Wize remix)	6:30
4.	"C'est dans l'air" (extended instrumental)	5:30

- 12" maxi

No.	Title	Length
1.	"C'est dans l'air" (extended club mix)	5:30
2.	"C'est dans l'air" (Greg B. remix)	6:00
3.	"C'est dans l'air" (Greg B. dance mix)	5:10
4.	"C'est dans l'air" (house club remix)	6:30

- CD single - Promo

No.	Title	Length
1.	"C'est dans l'air" (radio edit)	3:35

- CD maxi - Promo - Club remixes 1

No.	Title	Length
1.	"C'est dans l'air" (extended club mix)	5:30
2.	"C'est dans l'air" (Greg B. dance mix)	5:10
3.	"C'est dans l'air" (house club remix)	6:30

- CD maxi - Promo - Club remixes 2

No.	Title	Length
1.	"C'est dans l'air" (Greg B. remix)	6:00
2.	"C'est dans l'air" (Wize remix)	6:30
3.	"C'est dans l'air" (Fat Phaze remix)	6:10

=== Second release ===
- MP3 - Promo

No.	Title	Length
1.	"C'est dans l'air" (live radio edit)	3:49
2.	"C'est dans l'air" (Tiësto remix radio edit)	4:18

- CD single 1 - Promo

No.	Title	Length
1.	"C'est dans l'air" (live radio edit)	3:49

- CD single 2 - Promo

No.	Title	Length
1.	"C'est dans l'air" (Tiësto remix radio edit)	4:18

- CD single - Club remix - Promo

No.	Title	Length
1.	"C'est dans l'air" (Tiësto remix)	9:51

- CD maxi - Club remix - Promo

No.	Title	Length
1.	"C'est dans l'air" (Tiësto remix)	9:51
2.	"C'est dans l'air" (live version)	9:08
3.	"C'est dans l'air" (extended club mix)	5:30
4.	"C'est dans l'air" (Greg B dance mix)	5:10
5.	"C'est dans l'air" (Greg B remix)	6:00
6.	"C'est dans l'air" (house club remix)	6:30

- Digital download

All the versions

== Credits ==
These are the credits and the personnel as they appear on the back of the single:

- Mylène Farmer – lyrics
- Laurent Boutonnat – music
- Polydor / Universal Music – recording company
- Stuffed Monkey – production
- Isiaka – editions
- Alain Escalle – photo
- Henry Neu – design
- Made in the E.U.

== Release history ==
Date	Label	Country	Format	Catalog
27 March 2009	Polydor	Belgium, France, Switzerland	CD single - Promo	
1 April 2009	Polydor	Belgium, France, Switzerland	CD remixes 1 - Promo	12319
1 April 2009	Polydor	Belgium, France, Switzerland	CD remixes 2 - Promo	12323
27 April 2009	Polydor	Belgium, France, Switzerland	CD single	531 847-8
4 May 2009	Polydor	Belgium, France, Switzerland	CD maxi 1	531 847-7
4 May 2009	Polydor	Belgium, France, Switzerland	CD maxi 2	531 847-9
5 May 2009	Polydor	Belgium, France, Switzerland	12" maxi	531 847-6
30 November 2009	Polydor	Belgium, France, Switzerland	MP3 - Promo	—
14 December 2009	Polydor	Belgium, France, Switzerland	CD single - Promo	13237
14 December 2009	Polydor	Belgium, France, Switzerland	CD maxi - Promo	13243
January 2010	Polydor	Belgium, France, Switzerland	CD maxi - Remixes - Promo	13237

== Official versions ==
Version	Length	Album	Remixed by	Year	Comment
Album version	4:29	Point de suture	—	2008	See the previous sections
Extended club mix	5:30	—	Laurent Boutonnat	2009	This version is similar to the album one but is longer and contains extra beats
Instrumental	4:33	—	—	2009	All the lyrics are deleted.
Extended instrumental	5:30	—	—	2009	This version is similar to the Extended club mix, but all the lyrics are deleted
Single version	4:33	—	—	2009	
Radio edit	3:35	—	—	2009	The musical introduction is shortened and a refrain is deleted
Fat Phaze remix	6:10	—	Olivier Huguenard and Emmanuel Plégat	2009	
Greg B remix	6:00	—	Greg B	2009	
Greg B dance mix	5:10	—	Greg B	2009	This version is similar to the Greg B remix, but there are more dance sounds
House club remix	6:30	—	Greg B	2009	It contains a sample from "Show Me Love"
Wize remix	6:30	—	Basile Fanon	2009	This is an electro version in which the voice is distorted in the refrains
Music video	3:49	—	—	2009	
Live version (recorded in 2009)	6:08	N°5 on Tour	—	2009	This live version uses some elements from the 'Extended club remix', especially during the introduction.
Live radio edit	3:49	—	—	2009	Some sounds of the 'Extended club mix' are used during the musical bridge.
Live music video	4:40	N°5 on Tour	—	2009	
Live version radio edit	3:50	—	—	2009	The musical introduction is shortened with crowd sounds fading in and two middle refrains are deleted.
Tiesto radio edit	4:18	—	Tiësto	2009	This remix was made to promote the live single. It is an electro version which uses many synthesizer sounds. It is devoted to radio stations.
Tiesto remix	9:51	—	Tiësto	2009	This remix is similar to the 'Tiesto radio edit', but much longer. It is devoted to night clubs.

== Charts and sales ==
=== Peak positions ===
Chart (2009)	Peak position
Belgian (Wallonia) Singles Chart	13
Eurochart Hot 100 Singles	7
French Digital Chart	26
French SNEP Singles Chart	1
Swiss Singles Chart	44

=== Year-end charts ===
Chart (2009)	Position
Eurochart Hot 100	68
French Airplay Chart	65
French Singles Chart	13

=== Sales ===
Country	Certification	Physical sales	Digital downloads
France	—	60,000	2,000
