= Ninho =

French rapper (born 1996)

- Ninho live at the Vieilles Charrues festival in 2022

Background information
- Also known as: N.I
- Born: William Nzobazola; 2 April 1996 (age 30); Paris, France
- Genres: French hip hop, hip hop, trap
- Occupations: Singer; songwriter; rapper
- Instrument: Vocals
- Years active: 2009–present
- Labels: Mal Luné Music; Rec. 118; Warner TTR Tiens Tiens Retiens 2019
- Website: niofficiel.com

William Nzobazola better known by his stage name Ninho (French pronunciation: [niɲo]; born 2 April 1996) is a French rapper and singer.

== Early life ==
William Nzobazola grew up in Nemours, in Seine-et-Marne. His parents are Congolese. His father was Congolese singer Serge Kiambukuta. Ninho started rapping at the age of 12. He has credited American artists T.I., Gucci Mane, and Young Thug as early influences on his hip hop career.

== Career ==
From 2013 to 2016, Ninho released three mixtapes: Ils sont pas au courant Vol. 1 (2013), En attendant I.S.P.A.C 2 (Ils sont pas au courant 2, 2014) and I.S.P.A.C 2 (2016). On 26 October 2016, he released M.I.L.S (Maintenant ils le savent) which is certified Platinum, selling over 100,000 copies in France and reaching the #11 spot on the SNEP chart. Ninho then released five studio albums: Comme prévu (2017), M.I.L.S 2.0 (2018), Destin (2019), M.I.L.S 3.0 (2020), Jefe (2021), NI (2023). In February 2023, Ninho counted exactly 150 Gold singles, 82 Platinum singles, and 45 Diamond singles.

== Discography ==
=== Albums ===
Year	Album	Charts					Certifications
Year	Album	FRA	BEL (Fl)	BEL (Wa)	CAN	SWI	Certifications
2016	M.I.L.S (Maintenant ils le savent)	22	—	48	—	—	SNEP: 3× Platinum
2017	Comme prévu	1	78	3	—	28	SNEP: Diamond
2018	M.I.L.S 2.0	7	107	6	—	25	SNEP: Diamond
2019	Destin	1	10	1	—	2	SNEP: 2× Diamond; BRMA: Gold
2020	M.I.L.S 3	1	11	1	—	4	SNEP: Diamond; IFPI SWI: Platinum
2021	Jefe	1	12	1	—	4	SNEP: Diamond; IFPI SWI: Platinum
2023	NI	1	27	1	92	2	SNEP: 3× Platinum
2024	GOAT (with Niska)	1	67	1	—	2	SNEP: 2× Platinum
2026	M.I.L.S IV	1	31	1	—	1	SNEP: Platinum

=== Singles ===
Year	Album	Charts			Certifications	Album
Year	Album	FRA	BEL (Wa)	SWI	Certifications	Album
2017	"Roro"	17	—	—	SNEP: Diamond	Comme prévu
2017	"Mamacita"	3	35	—	SNEP: Diamond	Comme prévu
2017	"Chino"	8	48	—	SNEP: Platinum	Comme prévu
2019	"Binks to Binks 6"	3	47	—	SNEP: Platinum	Non-album single
2019	"Goutte d'eau"	1	3	26	SNEP: Diamond; BRMA: Gold	Destin
2019	"Maman ne le sait pas" (featuring Niska)	2	44	24	SNEP: Platinum	Destin
2020	"Lettre à une femme"	1	1	4	SNEP: Diamond; BRMA: Platinum	M.I.L.S 3
2020	"M.I.L.S 3"	2	26	77	SNEP: Gold	M.I.L.S 3
2020	"Grand bain" (with Dadju)	1	14	53	SNEP: Diamond; BRMA: Gold	Toxic ou Antidote
2020	"Carbozo 2.0"	7	11* (Ultratip)	88		Non-album singles
2020	"La zone"	9	7* (Ultratip)	83	SNEP: Platinum	Non-album singles
2021	"Millions" (with Orelsan)	3	45	74	SNEP: Diamond	No Limit (compilation album)
2021	"Jefe"	1	2	7	SNEP: Diamond; BRMA: Gold	Jefe
2022	"Carolina"	5	50	73	SNEP: Platinum	Non-album singles
2023	"3 singes" (with Werenoi)	—	47	—	SNEP: Diamond	Non-album singles
2023	"Freestyle Lvl Up 1"	1	17	37		Non-album singles
2023	"Freestyle Lvl Up 2"	2	29	35		Non-album singles
2023	"Freestyle Lvl Up 3"	6	37	—	SNEP: Gold	Non-album singles
2023	"25 G"	8	23	—		NI
2023	"Blue Story" (featuring Lil Baby)	2	13	—	SNEP: Gold	NI
2024	"3 Mai 2025"	13	—	—	SNEP: Gold	Non-album singles
2024	"Survie" (with Maes)	—	35	—	SNEP: Platinum; BRMA: Gold	Non-album singles
2024	"Coco" (with Niska)	3	25	—	SNEP: Diamond; BRMA: Gold	GOAT
2024	"911" (with Niska and Koba LaD)	6	49	—	SNEP: Gold	GOAT
2024	"UnRappeurÇaRap #2" (with Niska)	34	—	—		Non-album single
2025	"État des lieux (part 1)" (with La Fouine)	12	31	—	SNEP: Platinum	État des lieux
2025	"Triple V" (with Weenoi and Damso)	1	—	—	SNEP: Diamond	Non-album singles
2025	"Sale état" (with RK)	5	26	56	SNEP: Gold	Non-album singles
2025	"5 Bleus"	9	—	—	SNEP: Gold	Non-album singles
2025	"Skywalker Haze" (with Colors)	8	32	—		Non-album singles
2025	"+971"	9	47	97	SNEP: Gold	M.I.L.S IV
2026	"Les diamants de Bokassa" (with Tiakola)	2	28	19	SNEP: Diamond	M.I.L.S IV
2026	"Opps" (with Gradur)	43	—	—		Décennie
2026	"Zodiac"	74	—	—		Non-album singles
2026	"Bracelet" (with La Rvfleuze)	13	—	—		Non-album singles
2026	"Bantu mentalité" (with SDM)	—	39	17		Non-album singles

*Did not appear in the official Belgian Ultratop 50 charts, but rather in the bubbling under Ultratip charts.

=== Featured in ===
Year	Album	Charts				Album
Year	Album	FRA	BEL (Wa)	SWI	Certifications	Album
2016	"Grand Paris" (Médine feat. Lartiste, Lino, Sofiane, Alivor, Seth Gueko, Ninho & Youssoupha)	65	—	—	SNEP: Platinum	Médine album Prose élite
2017	"Madre mia" (Sadek feat. Ninho)	83	—	—	SNEP: Diamond	
2017	"Veux-tu?" (Lacrim feat. Ninho)	6	—	—		
2018	"Longue vie" (Sofiane feat. Ninho & Hornet La Frappe)	2	45	—	SNEP: Diamond	
2018	"La hagra" (YL feat. Ninho)	45	—	—		YL album Confidences
2018	"Sicario" (YL feat. Ninho)	25	31 (Ultratip*)	—	SNEP: Gold	YL album Confidences
2018	"Avon Barksdale" (Leto feat. Ninho)	124	—	—		
2018	"À midi" (Naza feat. Ninho)	130	—	—		Naza album C'est la loi
2018	"Midi dans le ghetto" (4Keus Gang feat. Ninho)	18	—	—	SNEP: Platinum	
2018	"Air Max" (Rim'K feat. Ninho)	1	28	—	SNEP: Diamond	Rim'K album Mutant
2018	"Bucci Night" (Yaro feat. Ninho)	53	—	—	SNEP: Diamond	"A zéro" - Yaro
2018	"Ma 6t a craqué" (Kpoint feat. Ninho)	5	—	—	SNEP: Diamond	Kpoint album Temps additionnel
2018	"Entre les murs" (Da Uzi feat. Ninho)	62	—	—	SNEP: Platinum	Da Uzi album Mexico
2018	"Sheitana" (Hornet La Frappe feat. Ninho)	12	—	—	SNEP: Platinum	Hornet La Frappe album Dans les yeux
2018	"Prêt à partir" (SCH feat. Ninho)	2	—	—	SNEP: Platinum	SCH album JVLIVS
2018	"Et je deviens fou" (Jul feat. Ninho)	19	—	—	SNEP: Platinum	Jul album La zone en personne
2019	"Papers" (Zola feat. Ninho)	10	2* (Ultratip)	56	SNEP: Diamond	Zola album Cicatrices
2019	"C'est elle" (Alonzo feat. Ninho)	42	—	—	SNEP: Gold	Alonzo album Stone
2019	"Quotidien" (Koba LaD feat. Ninho)	14	—	—	SNEP: Gold	Koba LaD album L'affranchi
2019	"Elle est bonne sa mère" (Vegedream feat. Ninho)	2	43	100	SNEP: Diamond	Vegedream album Ategban
2019	"Tel Me" (Jul feat. Ninho)	3	—	97	SNEP: Diamond	Jul album Rien 100 rien
2019	"Tes parents" (Leto feat. Ninho)	18	—	—	SNEP: Platinum	Leto album Trap$tar 2
2019	"Ma guapa" (Hös Copperfield feat. Ninho)	32	—	97	SNEP: Platinum	
2019	"Méchant" (Niska feat. Ninho)	1	—	24	SNEP: Platinum	Niska album Mr Sal
2019	"Musica" (Soprano feat. Ninho)	39	—	—	SNEP: Diamond	Soprano album Du Phoenix aux étoiles
2019	"BLH" (Gradur feat. Ninho)	50	—	—	SNEP: Gold	Gradur album Zone 59
2019	"Mayday" (SCH feat. Ninho)	9	31	54	SNEP: Diamond	SCH album Rooftop
2020	"Distant" (Maes feat. Ninho)	5	42	85	SNEP: Diamond	Maes album Les derniers salopards
2020	"Double Binks" (Leto feat. Ninho & Zed)	18	—	—	SNEP: Diamond	Leto EP; Virus: avant l'album
2020	"6.3" (Naps feat. Ninho)	1	31	37	SNEP: Diamond	Carré VIP
2020	"Dios mio" (Yaro feat. Ninho)	106	—	—	SNEP: Platinum	"La spé" (Deluxe) - Yaro
2020	"Macaroni" (Leto feat. Ninho)	2	40	36	SNEP: Platinum	Leto album 100 visages
2021	"La vie du binks" (Da Uzi, Ninho, SCH feat. Hornet La Frappe, Leto, Sadek & Soprano)	5	6* (Ultratip)	—		Non-album release
2021	"Vie de stars" (Leto feat. Ninho)	22	26* (Ultratip)	—	SNEP: Diamond	Non-album release
2021	"Kimono" (Sadek feat. SCH & Ninho)	8	—	—		Sadek album Aimons-nous vivants
2021	"Gasolina" (Hornet La Frappe feat. Ninho)	8	—	—	SNEP: Diamond	Hornet La Frappe album Toujours nous-mêmes
2022	"Dernier Etage" (Yaro feat. Ninho)	46	—	—	SNEP: Platinum	Non-album releases
2023	"Jolie" (Gaulois feat. Ninho)	1	9	26		Non-album releases
2023	"C'est carré le S" (Naps feat. Gazo and Ninho)	1	21	—	SNEP: Diamond	En temps réel
2023	"Blue" (Kenaki feat. Ninho and Naps)	11	—	—	SNEP: Platinum	
2025	"OTF" (Da Uzi feat. Ninho)	37	—	—		
2026	"Talbin" (Zed feat. Ninho)	63	—	—		Non-album singles
2026	"Avion de chasse" (Zeg P feat. Ninho and Gazo)	25	—	—		Non-album singles
2026	"Un peu beaucoup" (So La Lune feat. Ninho)	98	—	—		Offshore
2026	"Rien à célébrer" (Kalash feat. Ninho)	164	—	—		Ex-Voto

*Did not appear in the official Belgian Ultratop 50 charts, but rather in the bubbling under Ultratip charts.

=== Other charting songs ===
Year	Album	Charts				Album
Year	Album	FRA	BEL (Wa)	SWI	Certifications	Album
2016	"M.I.L.S"	188	—	—	SNEP: Platinum	M.I.L.S (Maintenant ils le savent)
2016	"Dis-moi que tu m'aimes"	119	14 (Ultratip)	—	SNEP: Diamond	
2016	"Elle a mal" (feat. Niska)	196	—	—	SNEP: Diamond	
2017	"De l'autre côté" (feat. Nekfeu)	2	—	71	SNEP: Diamond	Comme prévu
2017	"Caramelo"	4	—	36	SNEP: Gold	Comme prévu
2017	"Rose"	5	—	—	SNEP: Platinum	Comme prévu
2017	"Elle m'a eu"	6	—	97	SNEP: Diamond	Comme prévu
2017	"Comme prévu"	7	—	—	SNEP: Platinum	Comme prévu
2017	"Laisse pas traîner ton fils" (feat. Sofiane)	8	—	—	SNEP: Platinum	Comme prévu
2017	"Lové" (feat. Gradur)	10	—	—	SNEP: Gold	Comme prévu
2017	"HLM ou palace"	11	—	—	SNEP: Gold	Comme prévu
2017	"Ce soir" (feat. Alonzo)	12	—	—	SNEP: Platinum	Comme prévu
2017	"Dita" (feat. Hös)	15	—	—	SNEP: Diamond	Comme prévu
2017	"Pourquoi"	16	—	—	SNEP: Platinum	Comme prévu
2017	"Carbozo"	19	—	—	SNEP: Gold	Comme prévu
2018	"Boîte auto"	25	—	71	SNEP: Gold	Taxi 5 (soundtrack)
2018	"M.I.L.S 2.0"	3	—	—	SNEP: Diamond	M.I.L.S 2.0
2018	"Fendi"	4	—	—	SNEP: Diamond	M.I.L.S 2.0
2018	"Coffrer"	6	—	—	SNEP: Platinum	M.I.L.S 2.0
2018	"Un poco"	8	—	—	SNEP: Diamond	M.I.L.S 2.0
2018	"Pavé"	12	—	—	SNEP: Diamond	M.I.L.S 2.0
2018	"44" (feat. Yaro)	14	—	—	SNEP: Gold	M.I.L.S 2.0
2018	"Mama No Cry"	15	—	—	SNEP: Platinum	M.I.L.S 2.0
2018	"Bavard"	16	—	—	SNEP: Gold	M.I.L.S 2.0
2018	"PGP"	17	—	—		M.I.L.S 2.0
2018	"Vrais"	19	—	—	SNEP: Diamond	M.I.L.S 2.0
2018	"Chacun son tour"	20	—	—	SNEP: Platinum	M.I.L.S 2.0
2018	"Toutes options" (feat. Blasko)	21	—	—		M.I.L.S 2.0
2018	"Violet"	29	—	—		M.I.L.S 2.0
2018	"Bob"	30	—	—	SNEP: Gold	M.I.L.S 2.0
2019	"Maman ne le sait pas" (feat. Niska)	2	—	24	SNEP: Platinum	Destin
2019	"La vie qu'on mène"	3	—	30	SNEP: Platinum	Destin
2019	"Putana"	5	—	—	SNEP: Diamond; IFPI SWI: Platinum	Destin
2019	"Paris c'est magique"	6	18	—	SNEP: Diamond	Destin
2019	"Jamais" (feat. Dadju)	6	—	—	SNEP: Diamond	Destin
2019	"Jusqu'à minuit" (feat. Jul)	8	—	—	SNEP: Platinum	Destin
2019	"Jeune Lossa"	10	—	—	SNEP: Diamond	Destin
2019	"La vivance" (feat. Koba LaD)	11	—	—	SNEP: Diamond	Destin
2019	"À Kinshasa" (feat. Fally Ipupa)	11	—	—	SNEP: Diamond	Destin
2019	"Tokarev"	12	—	—	SNEP: Diamond	Destin
2019	"Money" (feat. Faouzia)	12	—	—	SNEP: Diamond	Destin
2019	"Big Pac"	13	—	—	SNEP: Platinum	Destin
2019	"L'ancien"	16	—	—	SNEP: Gold	Destin
2019	"NI"	17	—	—	SNEP: Platinum	Destin
2019	"Zéro paluche" (feat. Tito)	18	—	—	SNEP: Platinum	Destin
2019	"Outro (Destin)"	20	—	—	SNEP: Gold	Destin
2019	"À découvert"	97	—	—	SNEP: Diamond	
2019	"Kim Jong-il" (with Niro)	24	—	—	SNEP: Platinum	Game Over Volume 2
2020	"Promo" (feat. Damso)	2	—	35	SNEP: Platinum	M.I.L.S 3
2020	"Every Day" (feat. Griff)	4	—	55	SNEP: Diamond	M.I.L.S 3
2020	"Zipette"	4	—	—	SNEP: Diamond	M.I.L.S 3
2020	"La puerta"	6	—	94	SNEP: Diamond	M.I.L.S 3
2020	"Le jeu" (feat. Yaro)	8	—	—	SNEP: Platinum	M.I.L.S 3
2020	"Centre commercial" (feat. Heuss l'Enfoiré)	9	—	—	SNEP: Platinum	M.I.L.S 3
2020	"Intro (M.I.L.S 3)"	10	—	—	SNEP: Platinum	M.I.L.S 3
2020	"Mauvais Djo"	11	—	—	SNEP: Platinum	M.I.L.S 3
2020	"Gros vendeurs"	12	—	—		M.I.L.S 3
2020	"En chien"	13	—	—	SNEP: Gold	M.I.L.S 3
2020	"Tu sais qu'on est gang" (feat. Hös Copperfield)	16	—	—	SNEP: Platinum	M.I.L.S 3
2020	"C'était le rap"	17	—	—	SNEP: Diamond	M.I.L.S 3
2020	"Filon"	14	—	—	SNEP: Diamond	M.I.L.S 3
2020	"Bali"	19	—	—		M.I.L.S 3
2020	"Millésimes"	20	—	—		M.I.L.S 3
2020	"Pirate" (feat. Hös Copperfield)	17	—	Validé	SNEP: Platinum	M.I.L.S 3
2020	"Motto" (with Mac Tyer)	7	—	—		M.I.L.S 3
2020	"Problèmes du matin"	12	—	—	SNEP: Platinum	M.I.L.S 3
2020	"Tout en Gucci"	3	20* (Ultratip)	90	SNEP: Diamond	M.I.L.S 3
2020	"Tout les couleurs"	6	—			M.I.L.S 3
2020	"Privilège"	7	—			M.I.L.S 3
2020	"Kitchen"	9	—		SNEP: Gold	M.I.L.S 3
2020	"Nac 11"	13	—			M.I.L.S 3
2020	"Sur Paname"	54	—		SNEP: Diamond	M.I.L.S 3
2021	"Champion" (with Serge Ibaka)	15	—	—		
2021	"Mon poto" (with Kore)	2	35	50	SNEP: Diamond; BRMA: Gold	En Passant Pécho: Les Carottes Sont Cuites (soundtrack)
2021	"Elle m'a dit" (with Dj Quick & Hamza)	18	—	—	SNEP: Gold	
2021	"VVS"	2	38	16	SNEP: Diamond	Jefe
2021	"Vérité"	3	—	26	SNEP: Diamond	Jefe
2021	"Sky Priority"	3	—	—	SNEP: Diamond	Jefe
2021	"Arme de poing"	4	—	—	SNEP: Diamond	Jefe
2021	"OG"	5	—	—	SNEP: Diamond	Jefe
2021	"Intro"	7	—	—	SNEP: Diamond	Jefe
2021	"No Life"	8	—	—	SNEP: Diamond	Jefe
2021	"Aïcha"	4	—	—	SNEP: Diamond	Jefe
2021	"Mood"	10	—	—	SNEP: Diamond	Jefe
2021	"RER D"	11	—	—	SNEP: Platinum	Jefe
2021	"Athéna"	12	—	—	SNEP: Platinum	Jefe
2021	"YSL"	13	—	—	SNEP: Platinum	Jefe
2021	"La maison que je voulais"	14	—	—	SNEP: Gold	Jefe
2021	"Outro"	15	—	—	SNEP: Gold	Jefe
2023	"La vie de Johnny"	—	16	—	SNEP: Gold	NI
2023	"Eurostar" (featuring Central Cee)	1	11	—	SNEP: Diamond	NI
2023	"La Vie de Johnny"	3	—	—		NI
2023	"Yo Moko Oyebi"	4	—	—	SNEP: Gold	NI
2023	"Rich Porter"	5	—	—	SNEP: Gold	NI
2023	"Branché Sur Snap"	6	—	—	SNEP: Gold	NI
2023	"No Love" (featuring Ayra Starr)	7	—	—	SNEP: Gold; IFPI SWI: Gold	NI
2023	"Bad" (featuring Omah Lay)	9	—	—	SNEP: Gold	NI
2023	"Chiraq"	10	—	—	SNEP: Gold	NI
2023	"Edouard Nahum"	11	—	—	SNEP: Gold	NI
2023	"Respect"	12	—	—	SNEP: Gold	NI
2023	"Dans la Peau"	13	—	—	SNEP: Gold	NI
2023	"Bon Qu’À Ça"	14	—	—	SNEP: Gold	NI
2023	"Plus Qu’Eux"	16	—	—		NI
2023	"Grands Ensembles"	17	—	—	SNEP: Gold	NI
2023	"Mode S Plus"	76	—	—		NI
2023	"Christopher Wallace"	77	—	—		NI
2023	"Griot"	82	—	—		NI
2023	"Signes de Gang"	93	—	—		NI
2024	"Collabo" (with Niska)	4	45	—	SNEP: Diamond; BRMA: Gold	GOAT
2024	"Boucherie" (with Niska)	5	—	—	SNEP: Gold	GOAT
2024	"Jungle" (with Niska)	7	—	—	SNEP: Gold	GOAT
2024	"Ghetto Star" (with Niska)	13	—	—	SNEP: Gold	GOAT
2024	"Malsain" (with Niska)	14	—	—		GOAT
2024	"Guitare" (with Niska)	15	—	—		GOAT
2024	"Waribana" (with Niska)	16	—	—	SNEP: Gold	GOAT
2024	"Haq" (with Niska)	22	—	—		GOAT
2024	"Du Sal" (with Niska)	23	—	—		GOAT
2024	"Broly" (with Niska)	24	—	—		GOAT
2024	"Opinel 12" (with Niska)	25	—	—		GOAT
2024	"Authentique" (with Niska)	26	—	—	SNEP: Gold	GOAT
2024	"Loin D'eux" (with Niska)	39	—	—		GOAT
2025	"Vrais"	47	—	—		GOAT
2026	"Dictionnaires" (with Freeze Corleone)	5	43	40		M.I.L.S IV
2026	"Pilier"	8	47	32	SNEP: Gold	M.I.L.S IV
2026	"Des Piges"	14	—	—	SNEP: Gold	M.I.L.S IV
2026	"Lettre À Un Fils"	15	—	—		M.I.L.S IV
2026	"Intro - La Pression"	16	—	—		M.I.L.S IV
2026	"Au 33éme"	18	—	—		M.I.L.S IV
2026	"J'Ai Pas Changé"	20	—	—		M.I.L.S IV
2026	"Wallet"	21	—	—		M.I.L.S IV
2026	"Nwar"	23	—	—		M.I.L.S IV
2026	"R9"	26	—	—		M.I.L.S IV
2026	"Resiné"	27	—	—		M.I.L.S IV
2026	"N.W.A."	28	—	—		M.I.L.S IV
2026	"Les Mains Dedans"	30	—	—		M.I.L.S IV

*Did not appear in the official Belgian Ultratop 50 charts, but rather in the bubbling under Ultratip charts.
