= Jefe (Ninho song) =

2021 single by Ninho

Single by Ninho

from the album Jefe
- Language: French
- Released: 3 December 2021
- Length: 2:57
- Label: Warner Music France, Rec. 118
- Songwriters: Ninho; Therapy
- Producer: Ninho

Ninho singles chronology
| "Gasolina" (2021) | "Jefe" (2021) |

Jefe (Spanish pronunciation: [ˈxefe]) is a song by rapper Ninho. It was released on 3 December 2021 as with the release of his album of the same title.

== Charts ==
=== Weekly charts ===
Weekly chart performance for "Jefe"
| Chart (2021) | Peak position |
|---|---|
| Belgium (Ultratop 50 Wallonia) | 2 |
| France (SNEP) | 1 |
| Switzerland (Schweizer Hitparade) | 7 |

=== Year-end charts ===
2021 year-end chart performance for "Jefe"
| Chart (2021) | Position |
|---|---|
| France (SNEP) | 86 |

== Certifications ==
Certifications for "Jefe"
| Region | Certification | Certified units/sales |
|---|---|---|
| Belgium (BRMA) | Gold | 20,000^{‡} |
| Canada (Music Canada) | Gold | 40,000^{‡} |
| France (SNEP) | Diamond | 333,333^{‡} |
^{‡} Sales+streaming figures based on certification alone.
