= Point de suture =

Point de Suture

Studio album by Mylène Farmer
- Released: 25 August 2008
- Recorded: 2007–2008
- Studio: Brussels, Belgium; Paris, France
- Genre: Dance, synthpop, pop rock
- Length: 53:00
- Label: Polydor
- Producer: Laurent Boutonnat

Mylène Farmer chronology
Avant que l'ombre... à Bercy (2006)	Point de Suture (2008)	Nᵒ5 on Tour (2009)

Alternative cover
- Collector edition

Singles from Point de Suture
- 1. "Dégénération" Released: 19 June & 18 August 2008; 2. "Appelle mon numéro" Released: 3 November 2008; 3. "Si j'avais au moins..." Released: 16 February 2009; 4. "C'est dans l'air" Released: 27 April 2009; 5. "Sextonik" Released: 24 August 2009

Point de Suture is the seventh studio album by French singer-songwriter Mylène Farmer, and her 14th album overall. Preceded by the lead single "Dégénération", it was released digitally on 20 August 2008, then on CD five days later. The album primilarily consists of electronic dance music.

The album received mixed reviews upon release, with some praising its return to a powerful sound with catchy melodies while others criticized its lack of innovation compared to her past work.

The album achieved commercial success on the French, Swiss, Belgian and Russian album charts. The five singles released from the album were all number ones in France.

== Background and release ==
Pascal Nègre, the president of Universal Music, officially announced on 28 January 2008 in the French newspaper Le Figaro that Farmer would release a new album in 2008. In the following days this information was covered by other media outlets with initial reports suggesting that it would be entitled Onirisme. At the time, it was announced that it would be composed of 11 tracks, and it would be released in the last quarter of 2008. Several song titles were relayed in the media, such as "Onirisme", "Faire... et défaire", "Dans ton antre", "Ma nature est...", "Excaliburia", "Who's Mylène?", "Aux points cardinaux", "Je m'expose et m'impose", "Poésie visuelle", "The Witch of Dreams", "Voyage au bout de tes sens ", and it would also contain an acoustic version of Farmer's 1996 hit, "Rêver". A rumor that spread on the Internet claimed that the first single would be "À propos de nous". But finally, Thierry Suc, one of the producers, announced on 21 May that it would be "Dégénération". It was scheduled to be released on radio on 19 June. At the time, he also said that the album was not yet finished.

On 19 June, French radio RTL stated that the album would be released on 25 August. Finally, on 30 June, French internet store "Virginmega" revealed the name of the album, Point de suture, its cover and the track listing, and announced its release for 20 August. On 31 July, the newspaper Le Parisien stated that the album would be released in two formats: digitally and as a mobile phone in a limited edition. According to its edition of 30 August 2008, a duet with David Bowie was originally scheduled for this album, but was eventually canceled because of health problems of the English singer.

In December 2008, a limited collectible mobile phone edition (W980i) was released (2,000 numbered copies: 1,000 on the Internet + 1,000 at SFR Studios). This edition contained the album "Point de Suture", two remixes, a video, a making of, ringtones, visuals and themes of the singer. "Si j'avais au moins..." was released as the 3rd single on 16 February. On 27 March, Radio NRJ revealed the fourth single from the album was "C'est dans l'air".

At the concerts in Douai (Gayant Expo) and in St. Petersburg, a remix of "Sextonik" by French DJ Tomer G was played. The DJ stated on his site that his remix was done for a single, thus revealing that "Sextonik" was the fifth single from the album.

== Title and cover art ==
"All the stitches of the world cannot sew us again"

– Al Pacino, Carlito's Way

For the name of this album, Farmer drew her inspiration from a line of Al Pacino's in the 1993 film Carlito's Way, which appears inside the digipack edition of the CD: "All the stitches of the world cannot sew us again". To promote the album, Farmer appeared on the TV news of 31 August 8 pm, on TF1. Interviewed by Claire Chazal, she explained that she used the singular in the title of the album because it is (in French-language) a pun between "Stitch" (which evokes a hope) and "No suture" (which expresses a despair). In an interview for the French gay magazine Têtu, Farmer confided that if somebody did not know her work, she would wish that this person learned to know her through the hidden track of the album, "Ave Maria", which she had previously performed in June 2008 during the funeral of the composer Frédéric Botton.

The photos illustrating this album were made by a Japanese photographer named Tani Atsushi. The cover as well as the booklet show a doll covered with scars, with surgical instruments in the foreground. There is only one photo of Farmer inside the booklet, with her back turned.

== Music and lyrics ==
This album was announced as being very different from the previous ones in musical and promotional terms. During an interview prior to the album's release, Farmer explained: "If I compare it with the previous album Avant que l'ombre..., it will probably be more electronic... with many "up tempo" songs." According to Thierry Suc, "in this album, there will be a little of all the universes that characterize Mylène's albums". Critics noted that the album contains "melancholy ballads" (even if they are fewer on this album than on Avant que l'ombre...) as well as "songs with electro/techno sounds" and "electrodance" songs.

The subjects in this album are "sexuality, uneasiness, mantras, coded plays on words", "melancholy", "extreme love, purity, loneliness", "life, death, love tackled in turn with seriousness or humor". The album also evokes "the resilience and the indelible scars of the childhood" with numerous quotations and literary references (Süskind, Schubert, Baudelaire...).

== Critical reception ==
Professional ratings
Review scores
Source	Rating
Allmusic	link
Antennaria	link
Ciné Télé Revue	link
Métro Canada	link
Le Metro	link
Le Soleil	link
Le Télégramme	link
Star Système	link
Télé Star	link
Voici	link

The album received mixed reviews. La Voix du Nord published reviews from the singer's fans proving that the reactions are shared between "disappointed love and ecstasy". La Meuse and 20 Minutes summed up many critics deeming this album is "nor completely failed nor completely exciting", "without surprise but pleasant".

On 17 January 2009, the album was awarded 'Francophone Album of the Year' on the 2009 NRJ Music Awards, broadcast on TF1.

=== Neutral reviews ===
According to Le Parisien, "a gothico-melancholic muddle fills some vaporous songs of the album". The newspaper blamed it for the lack of novelty and the "disappointing duet" with Moby, but also said that this one "shows itself finally effective when it accelerates the rhythm, takes up the sound, let itself overcame by the electro heart-beat". Ouest-France said this album is "a true marketing blow", noting that "the electro turning point of the artist surprises, delights or disappoints..." According to Metro, Point de Suture is "an electro-pop album without surprise". After underlining the lack of promotion, French newspaper Le Figaro qualified this album as "massive", "discreet" and "commercial". It also stated that with this new album, "Farmer does not envisage a revolution or even a revelation", and that it has "a methodical faithfulness" to her previous works. It also reproached the "naivety of certain texts" and their "tendency for abstraction". Libération said, throughout this album, "the music seems to be only a pretext in a whole declination of subsidiary yields"; it contains "ten songs unwinding an ambient techno punctuated with ballads with voice of head without conviction". For RFI Musique, this "disc [is] not really daring", "rather usual, even routine", which seems especially made for the French tour of the next year. For Le Monde, this album constitutes "a slight disappointment" : it has a "dance rhythmic efficiency" but "a mere nothing of formal ambition is missing". La Meuse, as well as Télé Moustique, concluded that, with this album, "Farmer has definitively ceased to surprise".

=== Negative reviews ===
Very critical, 20 Minutes stated the album "does not play either in the sobriety or in the sharpness. Abstruse lyrics, erotic allusions, vapid melodies or agreed electro: Mylène Farmer is not afraid of the ludicrous". Belgian newspaper La Dernière Heure described Point de Suture as "an album rather disjointed, without any real surprise, but containing some potential hits". Le Journal du Dimanche deemed this "seventh studio disc confirms the breakdown of inspiration" of the duo, adding: "When we listen to the disc, we hesitate between distress and frank laugh". "Point de Suture oscillates between bad taste, streetwalkers melodies and noisy tunes", with a "poetry a mere nothing pretentious". The Canadian musical critic Voir qualified this disc as "a pompous and overproduced, static and cold electro-pop album". For Cité Gay, this album is "fair" and "kitsch". And for Télé 2 Semaines, "the lyrics are naive, the electro-pop music foreseeable".

=== Positive reviews ===
According to Le Matin, this disc "tries to reconcile all the publics of [the singer]". In it, "she combines all that which makes her strength: techno lightings, evident melodies, easy to remember, ballads touching straight to the heart, ambiguous texts". It also said that the last two songs are the best ones of the album. Sud-Ouest deemed that Farmer "remains faithful to the universe and the sound that ensure her success since 1985". La Provence underlined "the evident quality of the album, taking up again with the romantic and restless run-ups of the past, but with a beautiful tonic vigour". For the Swiss magazine Télé Top Matin, certain songs from the album are musically similar to Depeche Mode's universe and concluded that nothing can be reproached to this album. According to Music Orange, the songs are "impeccably worked", adding : "A unique style, recognizable at first listening", "a succession of puns of words (of pains) or of texts with double-meanings on background of melodies easy to remember and terribly effective". Le Nouvel Observateur noted that the Farmer's "voice remains fine, but is clear and most often put forward", and made a comparison with Jeanne Mas. L'Humanité deemed "the singer tries something new with Point de Suture". As for Voici, this album is a "beautiful deal" in which "Farmer has been able to regenerate after 25-year career", with this "collection of energy songs". Musiqueradio.com website elected Point de suture as "album of the year".

== Commercial performance ==
=== France ===
With 5,121 downloads on four days, the album went straight to number-one on the French digital albums chart, on 23 August, which is one of the records of the year. Universal Music even declared it was the record for a francophone artist. The album stayed for another week at number one with 1,510 downloads, then dropped to number three with 968 downloads, then continued to drop and remained on the chart (top 50) for 13 weeks.
With 108,596 sales, the album was directly number one on the SNEP Albums Chart on 30 August, which was to date the third weekly best-selling debut for an album in 2008 in France. It dropped to number two the week after, with 48,144 sales (616 sales of difference with the number-one album), then to number three and fell off the top ten after five weeks and spent nine non-consecutive weeks on the top 20. After dropping, it jumped directly to number 18 in January, due to the singer's performance at the NRJ Music Awards 2009, reentered the chart after the release of the single "C'est dans l'air" in March/April, and also during her Stadium concerts in September. Overall, it spent 64 weeks on the chart, 34 weeks in the top 50 and 48 weeks in the top 100.
In addition, Pascal Nègre, Universal Music's president, revealed on 2 September that about 175,000 Sony Ericsson mobile phones containing the album Point de Suture were sold.
This album was the singer's first one to provide five number-one hits in France.

=== Other countries ===
In Russia, Europa Plus radio aired the album for the first time on 23 August. It was available two days later and was certified Platinum on a single day for over 20,000 units sold. Five months later, it hit double Platinum.
In Switzerland, the album was certified Gold in one week and debuted at number two on 7 September 2008, then it dropped and remained on the chart (top 100) for nine weeks, but re-entered the chart after Farmer's concerts in Geneva.
In Belgium (Wallonia), the album reached number one in its first week, on 6 September, and stayed there for other two weeks. Thereafter, it dropped regularly and fell off the top 50 after 26 weeks. In Belgium (Flanders), the album was number 32 on 13 September 2008, and stayed for a sole week on the chart, but became Farmer's highest ranked album on this chart.
In the 37th week of 2008, the album entered the Greek International Albums Chart at number 25, then peaked at number 16 for two weeks, and remained ranked for five weeks. The album was also released in Ukraine and Poland on 6 October.

== Track listing ==
Point de suture
No.	Title	Lyrics	Music	Length
1.	"Dégénération"	Mylène Farmer	Laurent Boutonnat	5:26
2.	"Appelle mon numéro"	Mylène Farmer	Laurent Boutonnat	5:31
3.	"Je m'ennuie"	Mylène Farmer	Laurent Boutonnat	4:23
4.	"Paradis inanimé"	Mylène Farmer	Laurent Boutonnat	4:24
5.	"Looking for My Name" (featuring Moby)	Mylène Farmer	Laurent Boutonnat	4:20
6.	"Point de suture"	Mylène Farmer	Laurent Boutonnat	4:50
7.	"Réveiller le monde"	Mylène Farmer	Laurent Boutonnat	4:17
8.	"Sextonik"	Mylène Farmer	Laurent Boutonnat	4:36
9.	"C'est dans l'air"	Mylène Farmer	Laurent Boutonnat	4:32
10.	"Si j'avais au moins..."	Mylène Farmer	Laurent Boutonnat	5:32
11.	"Ave Maria" (hidden track)	Traditional	Franz Schubert	4:58

== Personnel ==
- Text: Mylène Farmer
- Music: Laurent Boutonnat
  - Except "Ave Maria": Traditional; music by Franz Schubert
- Produced by Laurent Boutonnat
- Sound and mixing: Jérôme Devoise
- Management: Thierry Suc for TS3
- Executive production: Paul van Parys for Stuffed Monkey
- Arrangements, programmation and keyboards: Laurent Boutonnat
- Guitars: Sébastien Chouard
  - Tristan Monrocq on "C'est dans l'air"
- Basses: Bernard Paganelli
- Drum kit: Matthieu Rabaté
- Mellotron, flute, percussion: Pol Ramirez del Piu
- Background vocals: Mylène Farmer, Alexia Waky, Desta Huilé, Mamido Bomboko, Aline Bosuma
  - Esther Dobong' Na Essiene and Dominique Rosier on "C'est dans l'air"
- Recorded at Studio ICP (Brussels), assistant: Vincent van Driesten at Studio Calliphora
- Mixed at Studio Guillaume Tell (Paris), assistant: Tristan Monrocq
- Mastering: André Perriat at Top Master, assistant: Jérémy Henry
- Boutonnat's assistant: Emeline Chetaud
- Administration: Corinne Potier
- Photos: Atsushi Tani, assistant: Volvic Nakano
- Doll made by Etsuko Miura
- Made in the E.U.

== Charts ==
=== Weekly charts ===
Initial weekly chart performance for Point de suture
Chart (2008)	Peak position
Belgian Albums (Ultratop Flanders)	32
Belgian Albums (Ultratop Wallonia)	1
European Albums (Billboard)	13
French Albums (SNEP)	1
Greek Foreign Albums (IFPI)	16
Swiss Albums (Schweizer Hitparade)	2

2021–2022 weekly chart performance for Point de suture
Chart (2021–2022)	Peak position
Belgian Albums (Ultratop Wallonia)	21
Swiss Albums (Schweizer Hitparade)	70
Swiss Albums (Gfk Romandy)	12

=== Year-end charts ===
2008 year-end chart performance for Point de suture
Chart (2008)	Position
Belgian Albums (Ultratop Wallonia)	13
French Albums (SNEP)	12
Swiss Albums (Schweizer Hitparade)	88

2009 year-end chart performance for Point de suture
Chart (2009)	Position
Belgian Albums (Ultratop Wallonia)	75
French Albums (SNEP)	92

== Certifications and sales ==
Region	Certification	Certified units/sales
Belgium (BRMA)	Platinum	30,000^{*}
France (SNEP)	3× Platinum	400,000
Russia (NFPF)	2× Platinum	40,000^{*}
Switzerland (IFPI Switzerland)	Gold	10,000^{^}
Summaries
Worldwide	—	700,000
^{*} Sales figures based on certification alone.^{^} Shipments figures based on certification alone.

== Formats ==
- CD – Super Jewel box (limited edition – 350,000)
- CD – Digisleeve limited edition, includes "Dégénération" music video
- CD – Catalog no. 5310833 ^{1}
- CD – "Fourreau" limited edition. Includes catalog no. 5310124 CD.
- CD – Slidepac edition. No CD booklet with this edition. Includes catalog no. 5310124 CD.
- Double 12" ^{1}
- Mobile phone SFR Walkman Sony Ericsson W980 and W910 (limited edition – 200,000)
- Collector mobile phone SFR Walkman Sony Ericsson W980 (limited edition – 2,000)
- Collector edition: Digisleeve CD, Promotional single "Dégénération" + (fake) surgical instruments (6,500)

^{1} Does not contain "Ave Maria"

== Release history ==
Date	Label	Country	Format	Catalog
20 August 2008	Polydor	Belgium, France, Switzerland	Digital	–
25 August 2008	Polydor	Belgium, France, Switzerland	CD – Collector	5310131
25 August 2008	Polydor	Belgium, France, Switzerland	12"	5310126
25 August 2008	Polydor	Belgium, France, Switzerland	CD – Super Jewel box	5310124
25 August 2008	Polydor	Belgium, France, Switzerland	CD – Digisleeve	5310125
9 September 2008	Polydor	Canada, EU	Digital	–
9 September 2008	Polydor	Canada, EU	CD	5310833
16 January 2009	Polydor	France	CD – Fourreau	5315542
23 March 2009	Polydor	France	CD – Slidepac	5316303
14 September 2010	Universal Music	Mexico	Super Jewel box	
