= Sextonik =

Single by Mylène Farmer

from the album Point de suture
- B-side: "Instrumental"
- Released: 31 August 2009
- Recorded: 2008
- Genre: Techno, house music, electropop
- Length: 4:35 (album version)
- Label: Polydor, Universal Music
- Songwriters: Lyrics: Mylène Farmer; Music: Laurent Boutonnat
- Producer: Laurent Boutonnat

Mylène Farmer singles chronology
"C'est dans l'air" (2009)	"Sextonik" (2009)	"C'est dans l'air (live)" (2009)

"Sextonik" is a 2008 song recorded by French singer Mylène Farmer. It is the fifth single from her seventh studio album Point de suture and was released on 31 August 2009. Despite being less successful than Farmer's previous hit singles from the album, it allowed her to beat her own record for the artist with the most number one hits in France.

== Background and release ==
Since the release of the album Point de Suture, the song has been mentioned in media, and particularly Public, as its deals with a sexual issue.

From May 2008, Farmer sold at her concerts vibrators, first limited to 1,000 copies, and costing 100 euros. The object was presented in a black box-shaped coffin with the inscription "Sextonik"; however, the song was not performed on stage. Many websites, newspapers and radio broadcasts talked about the vibrator.

Then at the concerts in Douai (Gayant Expo), St. Petersburg and Moscow, a remix of "Sextonik" by DJ Tomer G was played. The DJ later stated on his own site that his remix was done for a single, thus revealing that "Sextonik" will be the fifth single from the album. On 2 July 2009, the song was officially announced as the next single and it was revealed that it would be released under three formats: CD single, CD maxi, 7" maxi. On 7 July 2009, a promotional digital version was sent to French stations radios. The first promotional CD was sent a few days later, then a second one on 17 July.

It was first announced that the CD single would be released on 24 August, then about one week later, and the other formats were eventually cancelled. The 'Tomer G sextonik radio edit' was available in full on the Internet from 24 July.

As for Farmer's other two singles — "On est tous des imbéciles" and "L'Histoire d'une fée, c'est..." — there was no music video.

== Lyrics and music ==
This is a very upbeat song talking about the science of sex and rejoice and is tribute to the sex toys. It contains several neologisms, including a noun turned in a verb ("J'extase"). During the musical bridge, Farmer is heard moaning in a sexual manner.

== Critical reception ==
The song was not generally well received by media and critics. "Sextonik" was deemed as a song whose "inspiration seems basic" (La Meuse), was ranked "three degrees under "Désenchantée"" (Télé Moustique), was considered as "an easy wink to the tecktonik" (Cité Gay).

== Chart performance ==
With 4,533 units sold, the single entered at number-one in France on 5 September 2009, becoming Farmer's ninth number-one hit. Then it began to drop rather quickly, spending only three weeks in the top ten. It remained for 19 weeks in the top 50 and 37 weeks in the top 100. The song, however, was poorly played on radios in the country.

The single was a top 25 hit in Belgium (Wallonia) and charted in the top 40 for two weeks. It was unsuccessful in Switzerland where it was ranked in low positions for a sole week.

In Russia, the single went to number 39 on the airplay chart. It even peaked at number twenty on the Saint Petersburgh airplay chart.

== Formats and track listings ==
These are the formats and track listings of single releases of "Sextonik":

- CD single

No.	Title	Length
1.	"Sextonik" (single version)	4:38
2.	"Sextonik" (instrumental version)	4:40

- CD single – Promo

No.	Title	Length
1.	"Sextonik" (radio edit)	3:37

- CD single – Promo – Remix

No.	Title	Length
1.	"Sextonik" (Tomer G sextonik reloaded club mix)	5:57
2.	"Sextonik" (Tomer G sextonik club mix)	6:10

== Credits and personnel ==
These are the credits and the personnel as they appear on the back of the single:

- Mylène Farmer – lyrics
- Laurent Boutonnat – music
- Henry Neu – design
- Isiaka – editions
- Made in the E.U.

== Charts ==
=== Weekly charts ===
Weekly chart performance for "Sextonik"
Chart (2009)	Peak position
Belgium (Ultratop 50 Wallonia)	25
CIS Airplay (TopHit)	39
Eurochart Hot 100 Singles	7
France (SNEP)	1
Russia Airplay (TopHit)	41
Switzerland (Schweizer Hitparade)	77

=== Year-end charts ===
Year-end chart performance for "Sextonik"
Chart (2009)	Position
France (SNEP)	49

=== Sales ===
Country	Certification	Physical sales
France	—	15,000

== Release history ==
Region	Date	Format
France, Belgium, Switzerland	July 2009	Promo CD singles
France, Belgium, Switzerland	2 September 2009	CD single
