= Mylène Farmer en tournée =

2009 concert tour by Mylène Farmer

- Tour by Mylène Farmer
- Location: Europe
- Associated album: Point de Suture
- Start date: 2 May 2009
- End date: 19 September 2009
- Legs: 1
- No. of shows: 36

Mylène Farmer concert chronology
- Avant que l'ombre... à Bercy (2006); Mylène Farmer en tournée (2009); Timeless (2013)

From 2 May 2009, the French singer Mylène Farmer began a tour through France, Belgium, Switzerland and Russia. It was her fifth tour and supported her seventh studio album Point de suture. For the first time, this tour lead the singer through stadiums and, unlike her 2006 tour, featured a transportable stage.

== Background ==
Since the announcement of Farmer's seventh studio album, the media said that a tour was scheduled for 2009 to support this album.

About this new series of concerts, Farmer explained in an interview: "I am back on stage because I'm bored. I need to reinvent my life. (...) I want to feel dizzy again." She announced that the tour will be carried out throughout France and that the show will be grandiose.

A concert at the Stade de France, Saint-Denis, was first announced for 12 September 2009 (which is also the singer's date of birthday), then another concert on 4 September at the stadium of Geneva. Tickets for both concerts were put on sale from 28 March 2008. A second concert at the Stade de France, for 11 September was later announced on 29 March and the tickets were put on sale from 1 April 2008. In April, a concert was added in Brussels for 19 September. Other concerts are announced in the media at present, such as Bordeaux, but are not officially confirmed. In Paris Match, Farmer confirmed the tour would go to Russia in 2009, and additional dates in Ukraine and Latvia are rumoured. A concert at the Bollaert stadium in Lens was announced as being official then was denied in the media, but the final decision, the cancellation, that should have been known on 14 May, was published on 21 May 2008. On 15 May, four concerts were officially announced: two in Nantes and two in Rouen for May 2009. The following day, the record label Polydor confirmed them and added eleven dates scheduled in various cities (Nice, Clermont-Ferrand, Marseille, Toulouse, Nantes, Rouen, Strasbourg, Dijon, Lyon). On 23 May, three new dates were added : 6 May (Clermont-Ferrand), 26 May (Nantes) and 9 June, (Dijon). On 30 November, fours concerts in Russia were announced in the Russian media, then on 26 January 2009, one concert in Amnéville.

In February 2009 Farmer's tour producers TS3 cancelled the Eastern European tour dates without giving any explanation. However, there had been rumours for months that the local producers were facing economic problems. At the same time new concerts were announced for 28 June in Saint Petersburg and 1 July in Moscow, organised by different local partners. For the concert in Geneva, the technical problems relating to the enormity of the structures have been resolved (the stadium of Geneva has a smaller capacity than the Stade de France, Saint-Denis). Various media revealed that the stage should have been made out of glass, installed more than three metres above the ground. However, these details about stage design were denied by her creative producer Thierry Suc. He also explained that there will be some differences between shows in stadiums and those in hall. Jean-Paul Gaultier confirmed to be the fashion designer for this tour. It was also announced that the entire show will be filmed "with very sophisticated means of the tridimensional cinema".

Farmer did the rehearsals in Nice a few days before the beginning of her concert tour. The concerts in stadiums were announced as different as the others, because the stage was bigger and there was additional material.

== Controversy ==
The poster of the tour, first revealed on the Internet and then shown in Paris, generated a controversy. Indeed, on this poster, Farmer is lying on the ground, with distraught eyes, as if she had been thrown through a window. As a result, some media criticized this poster, that might suggest a suicide. Other media believed that it refers to a murder or a rape, or perhaps a message of farewell from the singer to her public. Others saw it as a promotional strategy. It was the subject of debate among Farmer's fans and critics on the Internet.

== Commercial success ==
A huge rush took place on sites purchasing tickets, such as Fnac, with over 25,000 connections per minute. Some angry Internet users expressed their dissatisfaction about this problem. The same thing happened on 1 April for the second concert at the Stade de France. According to Michael Drieberg, the director of Live Music, the concert at Geneva is the most quickly sold of all time in Switzerland.

The concert of 12 September (80,000 places) was sold out in two hours only. To date, it is a record. About 17,000 tickets were sold in two hours for the first concert in Geneva, which is also a record, and this show (34,000 places) was more or less sold out after one week. The second concert at the Stade de France was sold out in a very short time (one hour and a quarter) which is a record. For the concert scheduled in Brussels, many people slept in the street, in front of the stores selling the tickets to be sure to get a place. Therefore, 30,000 tickets were also sold quickly. For the concert at the Palais Nikaïa, the Fnac store has been raided by the fans before the opening hours, on 23 May, and two-thirds of the tickets were sold on the day. The same day, the first two concerts in Nantes were announced as sold out. On 26 May, the concerts in Marseille were almost sold out and, according to the French newspaper La Provence, the shows could yield about 9.5 million euros. On 27 May, Universal Music published a press release about exceptional sales of tickets for the concert : 100,000 places sold in one day on Friday, 23 May 2008, which is a record.

Many tickets were sold extremely expensive through unofficial ways. As a result, many disgruntled fans signed a petition on the Internet to denounce these abuses. In Switzerland, Farmer established a new record, selling over 58,000 places.

Finally, on the stage, there were two enormous skeletons inspired by Transit, a sculpture of the 15th century, a central staircase, and some naked models (which look like the doll on the album cover) placed in a library, and orange was the predominant color. Six autobuses for the 120 technicians, twenty semi-trailers of 38 tons, 380 light sources, 300 kilo watt of electric power and a giant screen were used for each performance.

== Critical reception ==
The show received mostly universally positive reviews from critics. Nice Matin qualified the show as "both grandiose and precise, but also full of emotion and shared pleasure". La Montagne and Le Parisien stated : "An impressive set design, a profusion of lights, screens, guitars, dances (...). One heck of a spectacle", "what a raging show !". According to La Provence, many fans were very satisfied by the concert and found it "grandiose". France Soir noted : "The design is detailed, ghostly, bathed in darkness and gigantism, supported by polished visual effects and amazing lightings". Coop said Farmer showed a "nive energy and an undeniable charisma". For Télé Moustique, the a concert in Douai was neat, but some choreographies were disappointing. About the concerts in Belgium, Le Soir concluded: "Nothing to do: Mylène remains irresistible", while La Dernière Heure found the show boring. Nord Éclair deemed the show as "ambitious, impressive, extremely precise and visually amazing".

The concerts in Geneva received generally positive reviews and a few criticism. Farmer "has bewitched her fans in a show perfectly staged" (Le Matin Dimanche), "the star offered a perfect show in every way" (20 Minutes), but with "a catastrophic sound system, an extremely predictable, little dynamic, little intimist singer. Her staff is little emphasized" (Actualité française).

== Set list ==
General

Anatomic act

1. "D'entre les morts" (Intro)
2. "Paradis inanimé"
3. "L'Âme-stram-gram"
4. "Je m'ennuie"

Red glitter act

5. Intro + "Appelle mon numéro"
6. "XXL"
7. "À quoi je sers..."
8. "Pourvu qu'elles soient douces"

Ballads act

9. "Point de Suture"
10. "Nous souviendrons-nous"
11. "Rêver"
12. "Ainsi soit je..."
13. "Interlude: Avant que l'ombre..."

Black vs White act

14. "Libertine"
15. "Sans contrefaçon"
16. "Je te rends ton amour"

X-Ray act

17. "Dégénération"
18. "Désenchantée"
19. "C'est dans l'air"

Final

20. "Si j'avais au moins..."

Russia only

Anatomic act

1. "D'entre les morts" (Intro)
2. "Paradis inanimé"
3. "L'Âme-stram-gram"
4. "Je m'ennuie"

Red Glitter act

5. Intro + "Appelle mon numéro"
6. "XXL"
7. "L'amour n'est rien...
8. "Pourvu qu'elles soient douces"

Ballads act

9. "Point de Suture"
10. "Rêver"
11. "Ainsi soit je..."
12. "Interlude: Avant que l'ombre..."

Black vs White act

13. "Libertine"
14. "Sans contrefaçon"
15. "Je t'aime mélancolie" (only performed in Saint Petersburg)
16. "Fuck Them All"

X-Ray act

17. "Dégénération"
18. "Désenchantée"
19. "C'est dans l'air"

Final

20. "Si j'avais au moins..."

Setlist in stadiums

Anatomic act

1. "D'entre les morts" (Intro)
2. "Paradis inanimé"
3. "L'Âme-stram-gram"
4. "Je m'ennuie" + Outro

Red Glitter act

5. "Appelle mon numéro"
6. "XXL"
7. "California"
8. "Pourvu qu'elles soient douces"

Ballads act

9. "Point de Suture"
10. "Nous souviendrons-nous"
11. "Rêver"
12. "Laisse le vent emporter tout"
13. "Ainsi soit je..."
14. "Interlude: Avant que l'ombre..." (Long)

Black vs White act

15. "Libertine"
16. "Sans contrefaçon"
17. "L'Instant X"
18. "Fuck Them All"

X-Ray act

19. "Dégénération"
20. "C'est dans l'air"
21. "Désenchantée"

== Tour dates ==
Date	City	Country	Venue	Attendance	Refs
2 May 2009	Nice	France	Palais Nikaïa	9,000	
3 May 2009	Nice	France	Palais Nikaïa	9,000	
5 May 2009	Cournon-d'Auvergne	France	Zénith d'Auvergne	8,500	
6 May 2009	Cournon-d'Auvergne	France	Zénith d'Auvergne	8,500	
9 May 2009	Marseille	France	Le Dôme de Marseille	8,500	
10 May 2009	Marseille	France	Le Dôme de Marseille	8,500	
12 May 2009	Marseille	France	Le Dôme de Marseille	8,500	
15 May 2009	Toulouse	France	Zénith de Toulouse	9,000	
16 May 2009	Toulouse	France	Zénith de Toulouse	9,000	
18 May 2009	Toulouse	France	Zénith de Toulouse	9,000	
19 May 2009	Toulouse	France	Zénith de Toulouse	9,000	
23 May 2009	Saint-Herblain	France	Zénith de Nantes	8,500	
24 May 2009	Saint-Herblain	France	Zénith de Nantes	8,500	
26 May 2009	Saint-Herblain	France	Zénith de Nantes	8,500	
27 May 2009	Saint-Herblain	France	Zénith de Nantes	8,500	
30 May 2009	Le Grand-Quevilly	France	Zénith de Rouen	8,000	
31 May 2009	Le Grand-Quevilly	France	Zénith de Rouen	8,000	
2 June 2009	Le Grand-Quevilly	France	Zénith de Rouen	8,000	
5 June 2009	Eckbolsheim	France	Zénith de Strasbourg	10,000	
6 June 2009	Eckbolsheim	France	Zénith de Strasbourg	10,000	
8 June 2009	Dijon	France	Zénith de Dijon	7,800	
9 June 2009	Dijon	France	Zénith de Dijon	7,800	
12 June 2009	Lyon	France	Halle Tony Garnier	12,000	
13 June 2009	Lyon	France	Halle Tony Garnier	12,000	
15 June 2009	Lyon	France	Halle Tony Garnier	12,000	
17 June 2009	Amnéville	France	Galaxie Amnéville	11,000	
19 June 2009	Douai	France	Gayant Expo	11,500	
20 June 2009	Douai	France	Gayant Expo	11,500	
22 June 2009	Douai	France	Gayant Expo	11,500	
28 June 2009	Saint Petersburg	Russia	SKK Peterburgsky	15,000	
1 July 2009	Moscow	Russia	Olimpiyskiy	25,000	
4 September 2009	Lancy	Switzerland	Stade de Genève	32,000	
5 September 2009	Lancy	Switzerland	Stade de Genève	32,000	
11 September 2009	Saint-Denis	France	Stade de France	80,000	
12 September 2009	Saint-Denis	France	Stade de France	80,000	
19 September 2009	Brussels	Belgium	Stade Roi Baudouin	34,956 / 36,685	

== Content ==
=== Indoor concerts ===
No	Song	Costume	Choreography	Comment
1	"D'entre les morts"	Tight suit, showing the human's muscular system.	No	The stage is covered with darkness, until the iris of Farmer shortly appears on a big screen in the middle. This happens several times until the iris one time "opens". An animated kind of film is shown, including skeletons. At the end, the screen gives sight behind itself, showing Farmer in a skeleton-like cage above a staircase.
2	"Paradis inanimé"	Same costume	No	Farmer goes out of the cage and downstairs to perform the song. This live version is nearly identical to the album version.
3	"L'Âme-stram-gram"	* Farmer: Same costume * Dancers: Same costumes like Farmer.	It is nearly the same choreography like at the Mylenium Tour. The introduction features a new one with first featuring only Farmer who is joined by the other dancers until the main part begins.	It is a very dynamic electro remix featuring some soundsamples of the original version.
4	"Je m'ennuie"	Same costume	The choreography, created by Farmer herself, is very simple with mainly repetitive arm movements throughout the whole song.	This version is similar to the original one, but features some extra sounds.
5	"Appelle mon numéro"	Glittering short dress with red cape with hood.	No	Before the main part, similar to the album version, begins, there's an interlude lasting about one minute and a half.
6	"XXL"	Same costume	No	This version is similar to the one at the Avant que l'ombre... à Bercy concert series.
7	"À quoi je sers..." "L'amour n'est rien... in Russia.	Same costume	No	Farmer first sits on the stairs performing the first verse of the song and then stands up. It is an acoustic version.
8	"Pourvu qu'elles soient douces"	* Farmer: Same costume * Dancers: Red coats.	The same choreography as in other concert tours is used, with only a few changes during the musical bridge.	This version uses many electronic sounds. The introduction is composed of Farmer's voiced mixed like at the beginning of the 'Remix club', released in 1988.
9	"Point de suture"	Blue dress.	No	Before the main part of the song begins, there is an introduction lasting about one minute and a half. The big screen of the beginning of the show appears again in the middle of the stage, showing the sun seen from underwater. During the main part, which is nearly identical to the album version, the screen shows a man and a woman together performing an unconventional choreography naked. This choreography depicts the meaning of the song.
10	"Nous souviendrons-nous" cancelled in Russia.	Same costume	No	This version is very simple, only composed of strings and a few piano notes.
11	"Rêver"	Same costume	No	This version is also very simple.
12	"Ainsi soit je..."	Same costume	No	Farmer is accompanied by Yvan Cassar on the piano. One chorus at the end has been omitted.
13	Interlude: "Avant que l'ombre..."	Same costume	No	It is a very dramatic instrumental interlude. During the beginning, Farmer goes up the stairs and then disappears from the stage.
14	"Libertine"	* Farmer: Asymmetrical business suit composed with a white tutu underneath. * Dancers: White tutu and white or black jacket.	Farmer and her dancers perform a new choreography in which elements of classical ballet are incorporated during the verses.	This is a very dynamic French rock version. The screens in the back show chessmen.
15	"Sans contrefaçon"	Same costumes	The choreography is similar to the one used for the other concert tours, with some changes during the musical bridge.	Many guitar sounds are used throughout the refrains and the bridge.
16	"Je te rends ton amour" "Je t'aime mélancolie" and "Fuck Them All" in Russia.	Same costume without the jacket.	No	The stage is covered with red light, while Farmer is performing the song. It is very similar to the original version.
17	"Dégénération"	* Farmer: Black leather jacket with a golden cross in the back. * Dancers: Beige jackets with a black cross in the back.	Farmer appears standing on a cockroach-shaped chair, while the dansers perform a dynamic modern choreography. She then stands up and walks to a platform which then raises in the air.	This version is preceded by an introduction of about one minute and a half. The main part is nearly identical to the album version.
18	"Désenchantée"	Same costume	The same choreography as in the other concert tours is used, with a few changes.	The sound is very futuristic, featuring many synthesizer sounds. At the end, Farmer sings again the chorus two times, first a cappella with the audience and then again with musical accompaniment.
19	"C'est dans l'air"	Same costume	Same choreography as used in the music video, including some additional moves.	Some sounds of the 'Extended club mix' are used during the musical bridge. After the main part of the song, the musicians and dancers are presented on the screen above the stairs.
20	"Si j'avais au moins..."	Long white dress	No	The stage is bathed in red and orange lights. During the song, the many screens display images of lava erupting. The last musical bridge is extended and very dramatical, while part of the staircase raises and reveals a tunnel into which Farmer goes and disappears. At the end the stage is covered with darkness again.

=== Outdoor concerts ===
No	Song	Costume	Choreography	Comment
1	"D'entre les morts"	Tight suit, showing the human's muscular system.	No	It is identical to the indoor concerts
2	"Paradis inanimé"	Same costume	No	Like at the indoor concerts Farmer goes out of the cage and downstairs to perform the song.
3	"L'Âme-stram-gram"	* Farmer: Same costume * Dancers: Same costumes like Farmer.	The choreography during the introduction was modified.	It is identical to the indoor concerts.
4	"Je m'ennuie"	Same costume	An additional choreography is performed by the dancers during the interlude.	A new interlude between this song and the following is added, containing sounds of this one.
5	"Appelle mon numéro"	Glittering red cape with hood.	No	The introduction is omitted.
6	"XXL"	Same costume	No	It is the same version as at the indoor concerts.
7	"California"	Same costume	The choreography is similar to the one at the 1996 tour.	
8	"Pourvu qu'elles soient douces"	* Farmer: Same costume * Dancers: Red coats.	The same choreography like at the other concert tours is used, with only a few changes during the musical bridge.	It is the same version as at the indoor concerts.
9	"Point de suture"	Same dress, only in white.	No.	While the introduction is extended, the end is shortened.
10	"Nous souviendrons-nous"	Same costume	No	The introduction is extended. Farmer sings the song on top of the catwalk, accompanied by Yvan Cassar beside her.
11	"Rêver"	Same costume	No	On 12 September (the singer's birthday), at the second date at the Stade de France, the audience sang "Joyeux anniversaire" ("Happy birthday") at the end of the song, accompanied by Cassar on the piano.
12	"Laisse le vent emporter tout"	Same costume	No	The stage is covered yellow while Farmer sings the song only accompanied by an acoustic guitar and the piano.
13	"Ainsi soit je..."	Same costume	No	Farmer and cassar are still on top of the catwalk.
14	Interlude: "Avant que l'ombre..."	Same costume	No	The beginning is extended because Farmer has to go along the catwalk too.
15	"Libertine"	* Farmer: White tutu, pinstripe trousers and jacket. * Dancers: Similar costumes.	Farmer and her dancers perform the choreography together.	The beginning is extended.
16	"Sans contrefaçon"	Same costume	The choreography is similar to the one used for the other concert tours, with some changes.	It is the same version as at the indoor concerts.
17	"L'instant X"	Same costume without the jacket.	No	This version is similar to the original one.
18	"Fuck Them All"	Same costume	No	It is also similar to the original version. The stage is covered with red light, while Farmer performs the song.
19	"Dégénération"	* Farmer: Black leather jacket. * Dancers: Beige jackets.	Farmer is sitting on a chair, while the dansers perform a dynamic choreography. She then stands up and walks to a platform which then raises in the air.	It is identical to the version performed at the indoor concerts.
20	"C'est dans l'air"	Same costume	The same choreography as in the video clip is used, including some additional moves.	The beginning is extended, similar to the 'Extended club mix'.
21	"Désenchantée"	Same costumes, although both Farmer and the dancers now have a large gold "X" on the back of their jackets.	The same choreography like at the other concert tours is used, with a few changes.	At the end, Farmer sings the refrain several times together with the audience. During an additional musical bridge, Farmer is standing on top of the stairs, until the lights go out.
