= Dégénération =

2008 single by Mylène Farmer

Single by Mylène Farmer

from the album Point de Suture
- Released: 19 June 2008
- Genre: Electropop
- Length: 5:27 (album/single version); 4:05 (radio edit)
- Label: Polydor
- Composer: Laurent Boutonnat
- Lyricist: Mylène Farmer
- Producer: Laurent Boutonnat

Mylène Farmer singles chronology
"Déshabillez-moi" (2007)	"Dégénération" (2008)	"Appelle mon numéro" (2008)

"Dégénération" (English: "Degeneration") is a 2008 song by French singer-songwriter Mylène Farmer. It was the first single from her seventh studio album Point de Suture, and was released first digitally and on radio in June 2008, then in a CD in August 2008. The song marked an important musical change in the singer's career. Despite cold critical and public reception, the single achieved success, peaking at number one in France on both physical and digital sales charts.

== Background and release ==
On 21 May, Thierry Suc, one of Farmer's producers, announced that the first single from the album would be "Dégénération" and that it would be released on radio on 19 June 2008. On 7 June 2008, a 30-second music clip was leaked to the Internet as well as the official cover art. On 14 June, the whole song was available to the Internet. At the time, as the origins of this song were, however, unclear, it had thus led many to believe that this leaked song was actually a remix due to its lack of lyrics.

Surprisingly, on the night from 13 to 14 June, the e-compil site, the official platform for downloading of Universal Music, proposed, for a few hours only, to legally download the song, probably by mistake. On 16 June, "Dégénération" was aired for the first time on Radio Jeune Reims, at 8:20 pm, although it was announced that NRJ should have the exclusivity of the first broadcast, on 19 June, at 7:00 am. According to the French newspaper Le Parisien, the DJ Martin Solveig participated in one of the song remixes. As scheduled, on 19 June, several radio stations broadcast "Dégénération", including NRJ, Delta FM and RTL. The song was then also available digitally on musicMe, virginmega.fr and iTunes, but only one version. A few days later, an unofficial CDR promo (unknown remix) of "Dégénération" was circulated and received attention from high-profile DJs. Finally, it was announced that the song would be released as a physical single on 18 August. On 4 July, certain French radio stations began to broadcast the radio edit version of the remix produced by Martin Solveig.

On the occasion of the single release, Farmer formed for the first time a partnership with a mobile phone company. So, the SFR subscribers received two SMS announcing first when the song would be available digitally on its site, then when the three excerpts of the music video would be broadcast on its site. On 11 July, the newspaper Info Music Hebdo said that the CD single would be released in a limited edition (50,000 copies) and that the CD maxi would contain remixes by Tomer G and Manhattan Clique who had previously worked with Farmer for "Slipping Away (Crier la vie)". In early September, TF1 promoted the song airing some excerpts between the programmes and the fully music video in the night.

== Lyrics, music and title ==
Coma t'es sexe, t'es styx,
Test statique
Coma t'es sexe, t'es styx,
Extatique...

— Beginning of the chorus

The song has an electro and techno-sexy feel and the lyrics play with sonorities, including alliterations. The only natural instruments audible in the song are piano and percussion; all others are effects. According to Discordance.fr, "Dégénération" is "an unstructured song, not a summer hit with an easy approach", and its music is "hypnotic". It can be assimilated to "Psychiatric", "La Ronde triste" or "Alice" because of "its short text and its rather dub". The song "amounts to a couplet repeated in buckle, a spoken bridge, and many choirs". The text "remains partially incomprehensible without reading official lyrics". The electronic sound has a "more metallic rhythmic" than Farmer's previous singles and constitutes "a remarkable artistic experiment". Psychologist Hugues Royer said that the message of the song is to "shake the boredom to find again the desire", to "promote sex therapy" to "reset the appetite for life".

Interviewed by Claire Chazal in the news broadcasting of 31 August, 8:00 pm, on TF1, Farmer explained that the title of the song was a reference to "Désenchantée", her 1991 number-one hit, in which the word "génération" is mentioned. On the cover of the various formats, Farmer is shown naked from the back. She has a green jade prayer beads around the neck that goes from the back to the buttocks and ends with a G-string-shaped cross and has in her back an enormous scar whose threads form the letters IY'H which mean in Hebrew : "With God's will". Farmer's position on the cover resembles the subject of Man Ray's 1924 painting Le Violon d'Ingres, as well as that on the cover of her single "L'Histoire d'une fée, c'est...".

== Music video ==
The music video was shot over two days (9 and 10 June) in Prague, Czech Republic. Polydor and French magazine Paris-Match announced that Bruno Aveillan, a director who has directed several television commercials for companies such as Perrier, Louis Vuitton, Orange, Nintendo, Nike and Philips, directed this 4:30 music video. About thirty actors as well as the dancers of Cave Canem troupe feature in it. According to Aveillan, extras perform "a resolutely modern choreography, full of unexpected." In addition, a Phantom camera, ordinarily devoted to the scientific research, was used for the shooting. Patricia Aveillan, Bruno Aveillan's mother, made the dress worn by Farmer in the video and explained in an interview that she was informed just ten days before the shooting. Her daughter and her son-in-law also participated in the shooting. The photographer Claude Gassian attended the shooting of the video.

The music video for "Dégénération" contains several gay and lesbian scenes.

The video shows Farmer lying on an operating table in a laboratory, surrounded by scientists. When the music begins, she wakes up, unties her strips, gets up, and throws blue laser beams from her palms to the doctors and the militaries. Suddenly, they begin to perform choreographied sexual intercourses (men with men, women with women, women with men) which eventually end as an orgy, while Farmer goes out of the laboratory.

On 26 June, SFR site revealed an excerpt from the music video for "Dégénération". Two other excerpts were broadcast on 1 and 2 July. The video was eventually fully aired on television on 10 July and immediately available on several official websites such as TF1.fr, Music SFR and universalmusic.fr. In Russia, "MTV Russia" channel aired regularly the music video.

This video was generally well received in the media. For example, Musique.evous said: "Its atmosphere is consistent with the single and the universe of its performer: cold, careful and erotic. (...) The production is impeccable and the greatest attention was paid to lighting, the texture of the bodies and the special effects". Many critics have noticed that the video was "erotic" and "provocative", and some have thought it was inspired by Luc Besson's film The Fifth Element (futuristic atmosphere, red hair, body covered with strips) or Le Parfum. According to La Meuse, gay scenes – including two soldiers who kiss and undress each other – would be "a wink to the fascination that Farmer has always exerted on the gay public". Royer said this video is "peppered with special effects worthy of the early career [of Farmer]" and conveys a message "which invites its listeners to come out of coma where they languish sex to engage in sexual intercourses without taboo. (...) The singer achieves the challenge of updating of the message of "Libertine" without giving the feeling of repetition."

In January 2009, when the third single from the album was released, it was revealed that the music video for "Dégénération" as well as that of "Si j'avais au moins...", were part of a short film named The Farmer Project. The action takes place in a country in Eastern Europe in the 1950s or 1960s. It begins with Farmer, who portrays a creature with supernatural powers, who is captured by two policemen and studied in a laboratory. At this point, the music video for "Dégénération" starts.

== Critical reception ==
=== Reviews ===
"Dégénération" received generally negative reviews from the media and the public. Indeed, many Farmer's fans have criticized the lack of lyrics, and the radio stations have not taken to the song. On 29 July, Yahoo! proposed on its homepage a very critical analysis of "Dégénération", both at the level of music and video. Tribu Move deemed that this song marked a big musical change in the singer's career. On 18 August, French magazine Télé Star qualified "Dégénération" as a "failure", "a repetitive single without refrain, which has left perplexed fans of the first hour as well as professional people". It also stressed that the song was "poorly aired on radio due to overall negative feedbacks from listeners". According to Le Monde, "Dégénération" is characterized by "rather minimalist arrangements and a curtness tone". For Le Figaro, it is a "very commercial single", with a "powerful rhythmic", a "very forward voice", and "imperturbably 'farmerian' lyrics". Starac Mag deemed the song is "less melodious than [Farmer's] previous titles, but equally effective". As for Le Point, "Dégénération" is "a repetitive electro pop [song] with naive lyrics full of muddled and mystic double meanings". More positive, Swiss newspaper Coopération stated: "Make love, not the war: such is the message of this electro-pop hit which eyes up Depeche Mode".

=== Chart performance ===
France

Despite negative reviews and a lack of substantial promotion, "Dégénération" climbed to number one on the French download chart in a few hours, very far ahead of the number two in terms of sales, with 4,998 downloads in the three first days. However, it dropped to number eight the next week with 2,028 downloads, then to number ten with 1,769 downloads, and was number 25 in its fourth week with 940 downloads. It continued to drop but gained 35 places and reached number ten, with 1,450 downloads, when the album was released in late August, then dropped rather quickly the weeks. It fell off the top 50 after 13 weeks. On the French Physical Chart, "Dégénération" debuted at number one on the chart edition of 23 August, selling 27,401 units, which was the highest weekly sales of 2008 in France, thus marked for Farmer a return at number-one since her 1995 single "XXL"; then it was number two with 8,495 sales, then number five with 4,891 sales. It counted three weeks in the top ten, 17 weeks in the top 50 and 41 weeks in the top 100, which is Farmer's longest single chart trajectory in France. "Dégénération" also reached number ten on the Club Chart, number 16 on the TV Airplay Chart and number 51 on the Airplay Chart.

On 5 July, "Dégénération", then only available digitally, entered the Belgian (Wallonia) Singles Chart at number six before dropping, but jumped from number 33 to number one after the single's physical release on 30 August, becoming Farmer's third number-one hit in Belgium; it remained for a 14 weeks in the top 40. On the Swiss Singles Chart, it charted first for a sole week, at number 58 on 6 July, with downloads only, then re-entered at number 26 after the release of the physical formats on 23 August, and fell off the chart after six weeks.

== Promotion and live performances ==
The song was never performed on television. It was performed during the 2009 tour Mylène Farmer en tournée, as sixteenth song of the show. Farmer wore a black leather jacket with a golden cross in the back, and her dancers a beige jacket with a black cross in the back. The song was accompanied by a choreography: Farmer appeared standing on a cockroach-shaped chair, while the dancers performed a dynamic modern choreography; she then stood up and walked to a platform which then raised in the airs.

== Formats and track listings ==
These are the formats and track listings of single releases of "Dégénération":

- CD single (limited edition – 50,000)

No.	Title	Length
1.	"Dégénération" (single version)	5:27
2.	"Dégénération" (radio edit)	4:05
3.	"Dégénération" (instrumental version)	5:27

- CD maxi / 12" maxi

No.	Title	Length
1.	"Dégénération" (single version)	5:27
2.	"Dégénération" (Tomer G sexy club mix)	8:33
3.	"Dégénération" (MHC future generation remix club)	6:29
4.	"Dégénération" (Manhattan clique mix)	3:20

- CD single – Promo / CD single – Promo – Digipack format 12" (collector edition)

No.	Title	Length
1.	"Dégénération" (edit version)	3:55

- CD maxi – Promo

No.	Title	Length
1.	"Dégénération" (comatik club remix (remixed by Martin Solveig))	7:04
2.	"Dégénération" (Tomer G sexy club mix)	8:28
3.	"Dégénération" (single version)	5:23

- 12" maxi – Promo

No.	Title	Length
1.	"Dégénération" (Martin Solveig degenerave remix)	7:04
2.	"Dégénération" (Tomer G sexy club mix)	8:28

- CD single – Promo (released in September 2008. Limited edition – 120)

No.	Title	Length
1.	"Dégénération" (MHC future generation remix club)	6:29

- Digital download

No.	Title	Length
1.	"Dégénération" (single version)	5:27
2.	"Dégénération" (Tomer G sexy club mix)	8:33
3.	"Dégénération" (MHC future generation remix club)	6:29
4.	"Dégénération" (Manhattan clique mix)	3:20
5.	"Dégénération" (2009 live version)	6:58

== Release history ==
Date	Label	Region	Format	Catalog
Early July 2008	Polydor	Belgium, Switzerland	Digital	—
19 July 2008	Polydor	France	Digital	—
18 August 2008	Polydor	Belgium, France, Switzerland	CD maxi	5310110
18 August 2008	Polydor	Belgium, France, Switzerland	12"	5310111
18 August 2008	Polydor	Belgium, France, Switzerland	CD single	5310112

== Official versions ==
Version	Length	Album	Remixed by	Year	Comment
Album / Single version	5:27	Point de Suture	—	2008	See the previous sections
Radio edit	4:05	—	—	2008	There are less verses than on the album version.
Radio edit – Promo	3:55	—	—	2008	
Instrumental version	5:27	—	—	2008	All lyrics are deleted.
Comatik club remix / Degenerave mix	7:04	—	Martin Solveig	2008	This version, only available on the promotional formats and digitally via SFR, has electronic sounds. The radio edit version lasts about three minutes.
Manhattan Clique mix	3:20	—	Manhattan Clique	2008	
MHC future generation remix club	6:29	—	Manhattan Clique	2008	
Tomer G sexy club mix	8:33	—	Tomer G	2008	
Music video	4:46	—	—	2008	
Live version (recorded in 2009)	6:58	N°5 on Tour	—	2009	This version is preceded by an introduction of about one minute and a half. The main part of the song is nearly identical to the album version.

== Credits and personnel ==
These are the credits and the personnel as they appear on the back of the single:

- Mylène Farmer – lyrics
- Laurent Boutonnat – music
- Simon Hawk (H&K) – photo
- Melikito – art "cicatrice"
- Henry Neu – design
- Isiaka – editions

Tomer G sexy club remix

- Tomer G at Tomer G Studios for Rave World of Music – remix

MHC future generation remix club and Manhattan Clique mix

- Manhattan Clique – remix, additional production
- Philip Larsen – keyboards
- Lee Turner – guitar

== Charts and sales ==
=== Weekly charts ===
Weekly chart performance for "Dégénération"
Chart (2008)	Peak position
Belgium (Ultratop 50 Wallonia)	1
Eurochart Hot 100 Singles	6
France (SNEP)	1
France (Airplay Chart)	51
France (Digital Chart)	1
Switzerland (Schweizer Hitparade)	26

Weekly chart performance for "Dégénération" (Tomer G Remix)
Chart (2008)	Peak position
CIS Airplay (TopHit)	65
Russia (Airplay TopHit)	55

=== Year-end charts ===
Year-end chart performance for "Dégénération"
Chart (2008)	Position
Belgium (Ultratop 50 Wallonia)	77
France (SNEP)	22
