= SNEP =

French music industry organization

- Formation: 1922
- Headquarters: Neuilly-sur-Seine
- Location: France
- Website: snepmusique.com

SNEP (French: Syndicat national de l'édition phonographique, in English National Syndicate of Phonographic Publishing) is the inter-professional organisation that protects the interests of the French record industry. Originally known under the acronym SNICOP, the organisation was established in 1922 and has 48 member companies.

SNEP's responsibilities include collecting and distributing royalty payments for broadcast and performance, preventing copyright infringement of its members' works (including music piracy), and sales certification of silver, gold, platinum and diamond records and videos. SNEP also compiles weekly official charts of France's top-selling music, including singles and albums.

== Official charts ==
=== History ===
The first attempt at a French national chart of best-selling records originated from a request by the American music industry magazine Billboard. The magazine's French correspondent, Eddie Adamis, compiled a top 10 list of the country's preferred format, the extended play (EP), for Billboard's "Hits of the World" column of 5 June 1961. The number 1 record was an Edith Piaf EP featuring the song "Non, je ne regrette rien". France's coverage in Billboard's "Hits of the World" continued until May 1964, when Adamis resigned from his position. The chart then resumed in June 1967, overseen by a new French correspondent, until SNICOP's involvement in late 1968. While the list continued to demonstrate the dominance of EPs, the British band Procol Harum succeeded in achieving the first French number 1 single, with their 1967 release "A Whiter Shade of Pale".

SNICOP published its first national singles chart, or "Hit Parade Officiel", in October 1968, compiled by the Centre d'Information et de Documentation du Disque. Earlier that year, with reference to the new chart compiler, Billboard had reported that "for the first time the main record companies are cooperating in an effort to produce a reliable sales chart which will serve the industry." By July 1973, SNICOP had long been publishing a national albums chart. These charts were abandoned in November 1977 due to disputes in the French music industry, leaving France without an official sales chart.

The date recognised as the start of SNEP's charts in the modern era is 4 November 1984. This date marks the debut broadcast of Top 50, a television chart show on the recently launched Canal+ network. From the late 1980s, the French charts were compiled for SNEP by Top No. 1 which was a subsidiary of Europe No. 1, but SNEP pulled out of the deal in February 1992 because they were unhappy with how Top No. 1 compiled the charts. However, this was resolved when Top No. 1 came up with propositions in May 1992 which SNEP approved of and that were fully implemented in stores by October 1992. In September, 1993, Europe 1 together with Canal+ who had compiled the French charts since 1984, decided to stop producing the charts for SNEP because they were making losses. The singles chart was not published by SNEP again until mid-November 1993, and was not published in Music & Media magazine again until mid-April 1994. The new singles chart was criticised by UPFI as being unreliable but this was disputed by SNEP. The albums chart was not resumed until early June 1994.

In December 2020, the London-based Official Charts Company (OCC) announced it was taking over the contract from German company GfK, in compiling the French music charts for SNEP /SCPP (Civil Society of Phonographic Producers), with the OCC taking over on 1 January 2021.

The current number-one is "Fille À Papa" by Vacra and La Rvfleuze.

=== 21st century methodology ===
Since September 2002, the official charts have been as follows:

- Top 100 best sold singles
- Top 150 best sold albums ("nouveautés") sold at full price,
- Top 40 best compilations ("nouveautés") sold at full price
- Top 40 best sold albums and compilations ("long" format) sold at mid-price or budget price

Criterion: The following guidelines are applied:

- "Nouveauté" album means its first day of release is less than 2 years
- Full price album means the catalogue price of album sold is €10 or higher
- The albums whose release is more than 2 years and/or sale price lower than €10 are excluded from the "nouveauté" charts.
- The albums sold at "mid-price" or "budget price" are classified in a separate chart and also includes long albums sold at discounted prices.

== Certification awards ==
=== Albums ===
The Gold album certification was introduced in January 1973. Platinum certification was added in May 1980, followed by the introduction of Diamond certification in November 1988, which was introduced together with multiple certifications (double Gold, double Platinum and triple Platinum). Silver certification was introduced in 1999. The double Gold certification was discontinued in June 2006 and Silver certification was cancelled in July 2009. Multiple diamond certifications were introduced in January 2014. Until 2016, certifications were awarded at the request of the labels, based on sales reported by an accountant report. Since 2016, certification is automatic and includes physical sales, downloads and streams. Streaming were originally counted by summing up the streaming volume for all tracks in the album, dividing the most popular track by 2, and then dividing the result by 1,000. In May 2018 streaming was limited to paid subscriptions and in January 2019 the conversion method for streaming was amended, accumulating all tracks and dividing by 1,500. The certification levels applicable through the years are as follows:

Album certification levels
Certification	Before July 1985	Before June 2006	Before July 2009	From July 2009
Silver		50,000	35,000	
Gold	100,000	100,000	75,000	50,000
Platinum	400,000	300,000	200,000	100,000
Diamond		1,000,000	750,000	500,000

=== Singles ===
The Gold single certification was introduced in January 1973. Platinum single was introduced in May 1980 followed by Silver in July 1985 and Diamond in January 1997. Silver certification was cancelled in July 2009. Until 2016, certifications were awarded at the request of the labels, based on sales reported by an accountant report. Since 2016, certification is automatic and includes physical sales, downloads and streams. Thresholds were set for the total of equivalent sales, based on the formula of 150 streams equalling one download. In April 2018 streaming was limited to paid subscriptions. The sales certification levels applicable through the years are as follows:

Single sales certification levels
Certification	Before November 1988	Before March 1991	Before May 2005	Before July 2009	Before January 2013	Before January 2016
Silver	250,000	200,000	125,000	100,000		
Gold	500,000	400,000	250,000	200,000	150,000	75,000
Platinum	1,000,000	800,000	500,000	300,000	250,000	150,000
Diamond			750,000	500,000	400,000	250,000

Since April 2018, the total sales of a single is calculated in terms of streams (one download or physical sale equaling 150 streams) and the certification levels are as follows:

Single streaming certification levels
Certification	Until April 2018	From April 2018
Gold	10,000,000 streams	15,000,000 streams
Platinum	20,000,000 streams	30,000,000 streams
Diamond	35,000,000 streams	50,000,000 streams

=== Videos ===
Video certification was introduced in September 2009 with Gold, Platinum, double Platinum and triple Platinum. Diamond certification was introduced in August 1991. The sales certification levels applicable through the years are as follows:

Video sales certification levels
Certification	Before July 2009	Before January 2018	From January 2018
Gold	10,000	7,500	5,000
Platinum	20,000	15,000	10,000
Diamond	100,000	60,000	40,000

== Sales charts: Significant milestones and achievements 1984–2019 ==
=== Artists: Most number-one hits ===
Number	Artist	Songs
21	Mylène Farmer	"Pourvu qu'elles soient douces", "Désenchantée", "XXL", "Slipping Away (Crier la vie)", "Dégénération", "Appelle mon numéro", "Si j'avais au moins...", "C'est dans l'air", "Sextonik", "Oui mais... non", "Bleu noir", "Lonely Lisa", "À l'ombre", "Stolen Car", "City of Love", "Rolling Stone", "Libertine", "N'oublie pas", "Désobéissance", "Des Larmes", "L'Âme dans l'eau"
9	Johnny Hallyday	"Tous ensemble", "Marie", "Mon plus beau Noël", "La Loi du silence", "Ça n'finira jamais", "Je te promets", "J'en parlerai au diable", "Deux sortes d'hommes / Nashville Blues (live)", "Le coeur en deux"
6	Celine Dion	"Pour que tu m'aimes encore", "Je sais pas", "My Heart Will Go On/"The Reason^{[A]}", "Sous le vent", "Et s'il n'en restait qu'une (je serais celle-là)", "Encore un soir"
6	Indochine	"J'ai demandé à la lune", "La vie est belle", "Un été français", "Station 13", "Karma Girls", "Nos Célébrations"
6	Rihanna	"Don't Stop the Music", "Man Down", "We Found Love", "Diamonds", "The Monster", "Work"
5	Michael Jackson	"Thriller", "Black or White", "Heal The World", "You Are Not Alone", "You Rock My World"
5	Michaël Youn^{1}	"Stach Stach", "Le Frunkp", "Fous ta cagoule", "Mauvaise foi nocturne", "Parle à ma main"
5	Shakira	"Whenever, Wherever", "Hips Don't Lie", "Beautiful Liar", "Waka Waka (This Time for Africa)", "Je l'aime à mourir"
5	Lady Gaga	"Poker Face", "Bad Romance", "Perfect Illusion", "Shallow", "Always Remember Us This Way"
4	Daft Punk	"One More Time", "Get Lucky", "Starboy", "I Feel It Coming"
4	David Guetta	"Gettin' Over You", "Sweat", "Dangerous", "This One's for You"
4	Elton John	"Sacrifice", "Don't Let the Sun Go Down on Me", "Can You Feel the Love Tonight", "Something About the Way You Look Tonight / Candle in the Wind 1997"
4	Garou	"Belle", "Seul", "Sous le vent", "La Rivière de notre enfance"
4	Maître Gims	"J'me tire", "Game Over", "La même", "Bella ciao"
4	Pharrell Williams	"Get Lucky", "Blurred Lines", "Happy", "Feels"
4	Stromae	"Alors on danse", "Papaoutai", "Formidable", "Tous les mêmes"

^{1} All the singles recorded under one of his pseudonyms or as member of his bands are included

=== Artists: Most weeks at number one ===
Weeks	Artist	Details by songs^{1}
40	Céline Dion	12 ("Pour que tu m'aimes encore") + 7 ("Je sais pas") + 13 ("My Heart Will Go on/The Reason")^{[A]} + 3 ("Sous le vent") + 1 ("Et s'il n'en restait qu'une (je serai celle-là)") + 4 ("Encore un soir")
39	Mylène Farmer	5 ("Pourvu qu'elles soient douces") + 9 ("Désenchantée") + 1 ("XXL") + 1 ("Slipping Away (Crier la vie)") + 1 ("Dégénération") + 1 ("Appelle mon numéro") + 1 ("Si j'avais au moins...") + 1 ("C'est dans l'air") + 1 ("Sextonik") + 3 ("Oui mais...Non") + 1 ("Bleu Noir") + 1 ("Lonely Lisa") + 1 ("À l'ombre") + 2 ("Stolen Car") + 1 ("City of Love") + 2 ("Rolling Stone") + 1 ("Libertine") + 3 ("N'oublie pas") + 1 ("Désobéissance") + 1 ("Des Larmes") + 1 ("L'Âme dans l'eau")
38	Pharrell Williams	8 ("Get Lucky") + 6 ("Blurred Lines") + 22 ("Happy") + 2 ("Feels")
37	Garou	18 ("Belle") + 3 ("Sous le vent") + 11 ("Seul") + 5 ("La Rivière de notre enfance")
37	Michael Youn^{2}	10 ("Stach Stach") + 7 ("Le Frunkp") + 8 ("Fous ta cagoule") + 5 ("Mauvaise foi nocturne") + 7 ("Parle à ma main")
30	Lady Gaga	4 ("PokerFace") + 1 ("Bad Romance") + 1 ("Perfect Illusion") + 22 ("Shallow") + 2 ("Always Remember Us This Way")
26	Elton John	3 ("Sacrifice") + 7 ("Don't Let the Sun Go Down on Me") + 10 ("Can You Feel the Love Tonight") + 6 ("Something About the Way You Look Tonight" / "Candle in the Wind 1997")
25	Crazy Frog	13 ("Axel F") + 7 ("Popcorn") + 5 ("We Are the Champions (Ding a Dang Dong)")
24	Ed Sheeran	15 ("Shape of You)" + 8 ("Perfect") + 1 ("I Don't Care")
23	Florent Pagny	8 ("N'importe quoi") + 9 ("Savoir aimer") + 6 ("Ma Liberté de penser")

^{1} Songs performed as duets and trios are included
^{2} Songs performed within Brastisla Boys and Fatal Bazooka bands and as Alphonse Brown included

=== Artists: Most top 10 hits ===
Artist	Number
Mylène Farmer	48
Booba	29
Johnny Hallyday	26
David Guetta	26
Madonna	22
Rihanna	22
Michael Jackson	19
Celine Dion	17
Lady Gaga	16
Maître Gims	16

=== Artists: Most top 50 entries ===
Artist	Number
Johnny Hallyday	78
Mylène Farmer	60
Madonna	59
David Guetta	51
Maître Gim	49
Booba	42
Rihanna	37
Michael Jackson	36
Céline Dion	35
Florent Pagny	30

=== Songs: Most weeks at number one ===
Weeks	Song	Artist	Year
22	"Happy"	Pharrell Williams	2013
22	"Shallow"	Lady Gaga and Bradley Cooper	2018
20	"Mambo nº 5 (A Little Bit of...)"	Lou Bega	1999
18	"Belle"	Daniel Lavoie, Patrick Fiori & Garou	1998
18	"Despacito"	Luis Fonsi & Daddy Yankee	2017
17	"Les Rois du monde (Roméo et Juliette)"	Philippe D'Avilla, Damien Sargue & Grégori Baquet	2000
16	"7 Seconds"	Youssou N'Dour & Neneh Cherry	1994
15	"Dur dur d'être bébé!"	Jordy	1992
15	"Living on My Own"	Freddie Mercury	1993
15	"Ces Soirées-là"	Yannick	2000
15	"Dragostea Din Tei"	O-Zone	2004
15	"Un Monde Parfait"	Ilona Mitrecey	2005
15	"Prayer in C"	Lilly Wood and the Prick and Robin Schulz	2014
15	"Shape of You"	Ed Sheeran	2017

=== Songs: Biggest jump to number one ===
Position	Song	Artist	Date
97	"Lonely Lisa"	Mylène Farmer	July 9, 2011
70	"Relax, Take It Easy"	Mika	July 7, 2007
67	"Hung Up"	Madonna	November 12, 2005
64	"Baila morena"	Zucchero	February 25, 2006
64	"Gettin' Over You"	David Guetta & Chris Willis (feat. Fergie & LMFAO)	June 19, 2010
60	"Zidane y va marquer"	Cauet	July 15, 2006
49	"The Ketchup Song (Aserejé)"	Las Ketchup	September 14, 2002
47	"Nolwenn Ohwo!"	Nolwenn Leroy	January 28, 2006
26	"Spaceman"	Babylon Zoo	March 9, 1996
21	"Don't Cry for Me Argentina"	Madonna	January 25, 1997

=== Songs: Most weeks in the top 10 ===
Weeks	Song	Artist	Year
46	"Shallow"	Lady Gaga & Bradley Cooper	2018
37	"Happy"	Pharrell Williams	2013
37	"Dance Monkey"	Tones and I	2019
36	"Shape of You"	Ed Sheeran	2017
35	"Blinding Lights"	The Weeknd	2019
35	"Chandelier"	Sia	2014
33	"A nos souvenirs"	Trois Cafés Gourmands	2018
31	"Pour que tu m'aimes encore"	Céline Dion	1995
31	"Belle"	Patrick Fiori, Garou & Daniel Lavoie	1998
31	"Moi... Lolita"	Alizée	2000

== Sales and streaming charts: Significant milestones and achievements 2017–present ==
=== Songs: Most weeks at number one ===
Weeks	Song	Artist	Year
28	"Melodrama"	Disiz and Theodora	2025
18	"Petit Génie"	Jungeli featuring Abou Debeing, Alonzo, Lossa and Imen Es	2023
15	"Shape of You"	Ed Sheeran	2017
13	"Despacito"	Luis Fonsi featuring Daddy Yankee and Justin Bieber	2017
13	"Die"	Gazo	2022
12	"Bande organisée"	Jul featuring Sch, Naps, Kofs, Elams, Solda, Houari and Soso Maness	2020
11	"Réseaux"	Niska	2017
10	"La Kiffance"	Naps	2021
9	"Jefe"	Ninho	2021
8	"Old Town Road"	Lil Nas X	2019
8	"Flowers"	Miley Cyrus	2023
8	"Sois pas timide"	Gims	2024

=== Artists: Most number-one hits ===
Number	Artist	Songs
14	Damso	"Mwaka Moon", "Ipséité", "Smog", "La Loi du silence", "Rêves bizarres", "Tricheur", "Σ. Morose", "Dégaine", "Rencontre", "Nocif", "La Rue", "Pyramide", "Alpha", "Triple V"
13	Ninho	"Air Max", "Goutte d'eau", "Méchant", "6.3", "Lettre à une femme", "Grand bain", "Jefe", "Tout va Bien", "Jolie", "C'est carré le S", "Freestyle Lvl Up 1","Eurostar", "Triple V"
9	Booba	"Petite fille", "Madrina", "Sale Mood", "PGP", "Médicament", "Arc-en-ciel", "5G", "Ratpi World", "Mona Lisa"
9	Gazo	"Filtré", "Le Classico Organisé", "Celine 3x", "Die", "C'est carré le S", "La Rue", "Casanova", "Notre Dame", "Nanani Nanana"
7	Naps	"6.3", "Bande organisée", "La Kiffance", "Le Classico Organisé", "Tout va Bien","C'est carré le S"
7	SCH	"Bande organisée", "9 1 1 3", "Mother Fuck", "Marché noir", "Mannschaft", "Lif", "Un Monde à L'Autre"
7	Gims	"Spider", "Sois pas timide", "Ciel", "Ninao", "Air Force blanche", "Parisienne", "Un Monde à L'Autre"
6	Jul	"Toto et Ninetta", "Bande organisée", "Mother Fuck", "Le Classico Organisé","Phénoménal", "Air Force blanche"
6	Aya Nakamura	"Djadja", "Copines", "Jolie nana", "Plus jamais", "Dégaine", "Sexy Nana"
5	PLK	"Un Peu De Haine", "Petrouchka", "Le Classico Organisé", "Demain", "Pocahontas"

=== Artists: Most top 10 hits ===
Artist	Number
Ninho	73
Damso	58
Niska	39
Booba	34
Gazo	33
Tiakola	32
PLK	30
Orelsan	25
Aya Nakamura	25
Gims	22

== Notes ==
- A Released as a double A-side in France.

== See also ==
- Institut français d'opinion publique (IFOP)
- List of number one hits in France
- List of artists who reached number one on the French Singles Chart
- List of best-selling albums in France
- Global music industry market share data
