= Kamikaze (disambiguation) =

The kamikaze were military aviators of the Empire of Japan who made suicide attacks, primarily against Allied naval vessels, during World War II.

Kamikaze may also refer to:

== Arts, entertainment and media ==
=== Music ===
==== Performers ====
- Kamikaze (band), an Argentine heavy metal band
- Kamikazee, a Filipino rock band
- Matt Robinson (footballer, born 1993), also an English rapper under the stage name Kamakaze

==== Albums ====
- Kamikaze (Eminem album) or the title song (see below), 2018
- Kamikaze (Twista album), 2004
- Kamikazee (album), by Kamikazee, 2002

==== Songs ====
- "Kamikaze" (Eminem song), 2018
- "Kamikaze" (Lil Mosey song), 2018
- "Kamikaze" (MØ song), 2015
- "Kamikaze" (Walk the Moon song), 2017
- "Born to Lose"/"Kamikaze", by King Adora, 2003
- "Kamikaze", by Amaral from Gato negro dragón rojo, 2008
- "Kamikaze", by Baboon from Sausage, 1992
- "Kamikaze", by the Boys, 1979
- "Kamikaze", by Carly Rae Jepsen from The Loveliest Time, 2023
- "Kamikaze", by D'espairsRay from Redeemer, 2009
- "Kamikaze", by Five Iron Frenzy from Cheeses..., 2003
- "Kamikaze", by Flower Travellin' Band from Made in Japan, 1972
- "Kamikaze", by MC Lyte from Act Like You Know, 1991
- "Kamikaze", by Omar Apollo from Apolonio, 2020
- "Kamikaze", by Owl City from All Things Bright and Beautiful, 2011
- "Kamikaze", by PJ Harvey from Stories from the City, Stories from the Sea, 2000
- "Kamikaze", by Spock's Beard from X, 2010
- "Kamikaze", by Susanne Sundfør from Ten Love Songs, 2015
- "Kamikaze", by the Thompson Twins from Quick Step & Side Kick, 1983

==== Other uses in music ====
- Kamikaze (record label), a Thaipop record label
- ESP Kamikaze, a guitar model distributed by ESP

=== Other arts and entertainment ===
- Kamikaze (comics), a fictional character in the Marvel Comics universe
- Kami-Kaze (manga), a 1997 manga series by Satoshi Shiki
- Kamikaze (1986 film), a French science fiction film
- Kamikaze (2014 film), a Spanish comedy-drama film
- The Eternal Zero (film), a 2013 Japanese war film retitled Kamikaze in some regions
- Kamikaze, a 2021 HBO Max original program
- Kamikadze – Boski Wiatr, a novel by Bohdan Arct
- Kamikaze (video game) or Astro Invader, a 1979 arcade game

== Military ==
- Kamikaze-class destroyer, two classes of destroyers of the Imperial Japanese Navy
- Japanese destroyer Kamikaze, two destroyers of the Imperial Japanese Navy
- Japanese salvage ship Kamikaze Maru No. 5, a salvage and repair ship of the Imperial Japanese Navy
- Japanese salvage ship Kamikaze Maru No. 7, a salvage and repair ship of the Imperial Japanese Navy
- Kamikaze drone (disambiguation), two types of unmanned aerial vehicles

== Sports ==
- Kamakazi (BMX rider), Australian BMX cyclist Jamie Hildebrandt (born 1981)
- Kamikaze Shoichi, Japanese sumo wrestler Shoichi Akazawa (1921–1990)
- Mammoth Kamikaze or Kamikaze Downhill, a former American downhill mountain bike race

== Other uses ==
- Kamikaze (1937 aircraft), a Mitsubishi Ki-15 Karigane aircraft, the first Japanese-built aircraft to fly from Japan to Europe
- Kamikaze (cocktail), a vodka cocktail
- Kamikaze (typhoon), two typhoons that defeated Mongol invasions of Japan in 1274 and 1281
- Kamikaze, a codename for a 2007 OpenWrt release
- Kamikaze knot, a variant of Sheepshank knot, a shortening knot
- Kamikaze, a water slide at Magic Mountain in Moncton, New Brunswick

== See also ==
- Kamikaze Curve, a sharp curve on New York State Route 17
- Kamikaze 1NT, a treatment for an opening notrump bid in contract bridge
- Kamikaz (rapper), French rapper
- Comikaze, a 2005 EP by Kate Miller-Heidke
- Comikaze Expo, an annual event in Los Angeles, California
- Shinpūren rebellion, an 1876 ex-samurai uprising in Kumamoto, Japan (Shinpū is an alternate reading of the characters for kamikaze)
