= Wesh alors =

Single by Jul

from the album My World
- Released: 2015
- Genre: Pop rap
- Length: 3:16
- Label: D'or et de platine
- Songwriter: Julien Mari
- Producer: Jul

Jul singles chronology
"En Y" (2015)	"Wesh alors" (2015)	"Lova" (2015)

Music video
- "Wesh alors" on YouTube

"Wesh alors" is a song by French rapper Jul released in 2015.

== Charts ==
=== Weekly charts ===
Chart (2015)	Peak position
Belgium (Ultratip Bubbling Under Wallonia)	26
France (SNEP)	25

=== Year-end charts ===
Chart (2015)	Position
France (SNEP)	191
