= Tchikita =

2016 single by Jul

Single by Jul

from the album L'Ovni
- Released: 19 September 2016
- Recorded: 2016
- Genre: Pop rap; French rap
- Length: 3:13
- Label: D'or et de la platine
- Songwriter: Julien Maris
- Producer: Jul

Jul singles chronology
"On m'appelle l'Ovni" (2016)	"Tchikita" (2016)	"C'est de la gratte" (2016)

"Tchikita" is a song by French rapper Jul released on 19 September 2016 as a single from his album L'Ovni. It peaked at number three in the French SNEP Singles. Its audio video has 309 million views.

== Charts ==
=== Weekly charts ===
Chart (2016)	Peak position
Belgium (Ultratop 50 Wallonia)	39
France (SNEP)	3

=== Year-end charts ===
Chart (2016)	Position
France (SNEP)	23
Chart (2017)	Position
France (SNEP)	83

== Certifications ==
Region	Certification	Certified units/sales
France (SNEP)	Diamond	233,333^{‡}
^{‡} Sales+streaming figures based on certification alone.
