= USS Canopus (AS-9) =

Tender of the United States Navy

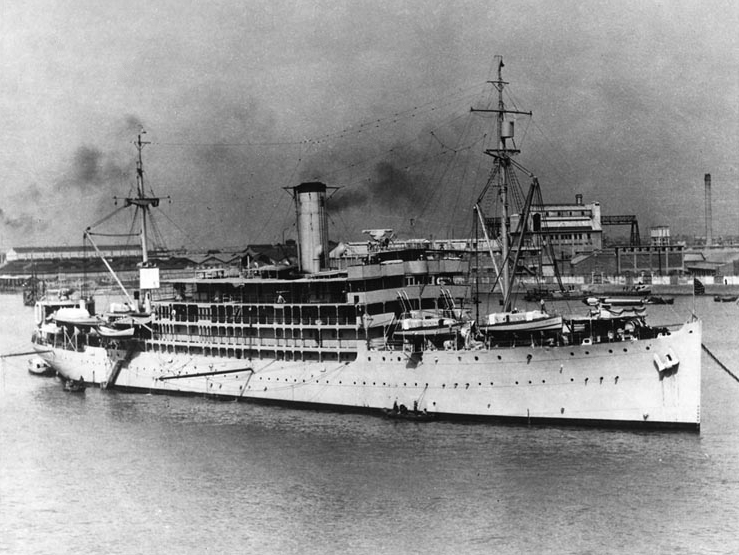
- USS Canopus (AS-9) off Shanghai, China, prior to World War II.

History

United States
- Name: USS Canopus
- Namesake: Canopus
- Builder: New York Shipbuilding, Camden, New Jersey
- Launched: 19 December 1918
- Acquired: 22 November 1921
- Commissioned: 24 January 1922
- Honors and awards: 1 battle star (World War II)
- Fate: Scuttled, 10 April 1942

General characteristics
- Type: Submarine tender
- Displacement: 5,975 long tons (6,071 t)
- Length: 373 ft 8 in (113.89 m)
- Beam: 51 ft 6 in (15.70 m)
- Draft: 16 ft 4 in (4.98 m)
- Speed: 13 knots (24 km/h; 15 mph)
- Complement: 554
- Armament: 2 × 5 in (130 mm) guns; 4 × 3 in (76 mm) guns

USS Canopus (ID-4352-A/AS-9) was a submarine tender in the United States Navy, named for the star Canopus.

Canopus was launched in 1919 by New York Shipbuilding Company, Camden, New Jersey, as the passenger liner SS Santa Leonora for W. R. Grace and Company, but taken over by the U.S. Navy upon completion in July 1919 and commissioned as USS Santa Leonora (ID-4352-A). She was briefly employed as a trans-Atlantic troop transport before being decommissioned and transferred to the U.S. Army in September 1919.

The ship was reacquired by the Navy from the Shipping Board on 22 November 1921. The ship was converted to a submarine tender, and commissioned at Boston on 24 January 1922.

== Service history ==
=== 1922–1941 ===
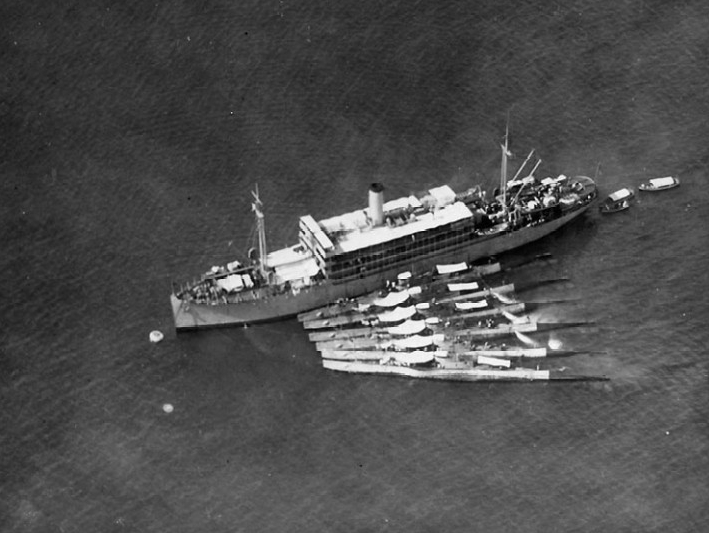
Canopus with all six members of Submarine Division 17 in Apra Harbor, Guam, October 1924

Canopus reported to Submarine Force, Atlantic Fleet, and remained at Boston until 9 November 1922, when she sailed for further fitting out at Coco Solo, Canal Zone, and San Pedro, California, her base as tender to the submarines of Division 9 until 17 July 1923.

Sailing to Pearl Harbor, Canopus tended Submarine Division 17 of the Battle Force with whom she sailed for permanent duty with the Asiatic Fleet in September 1924. Canopus with her squadron of submarines arrived in the Philippines on 4 November 1924. Canopus began her regular schedule of services in Manila Bay, and each summer based with the fleet at Tsingtao, China, with occasional training cruises to various Chinese and Japanese ports, and to the British and French colonies. Between 1927 and 1931, the tender was flagship of submarine divisions, Asiatic Fleet, and later was attached to Submarine Division 10, and was flagship of Submarine Squadron 5.

Canopus deployed to China five times in 1931, 1932, 1937, 1938 and 1939 respectively.

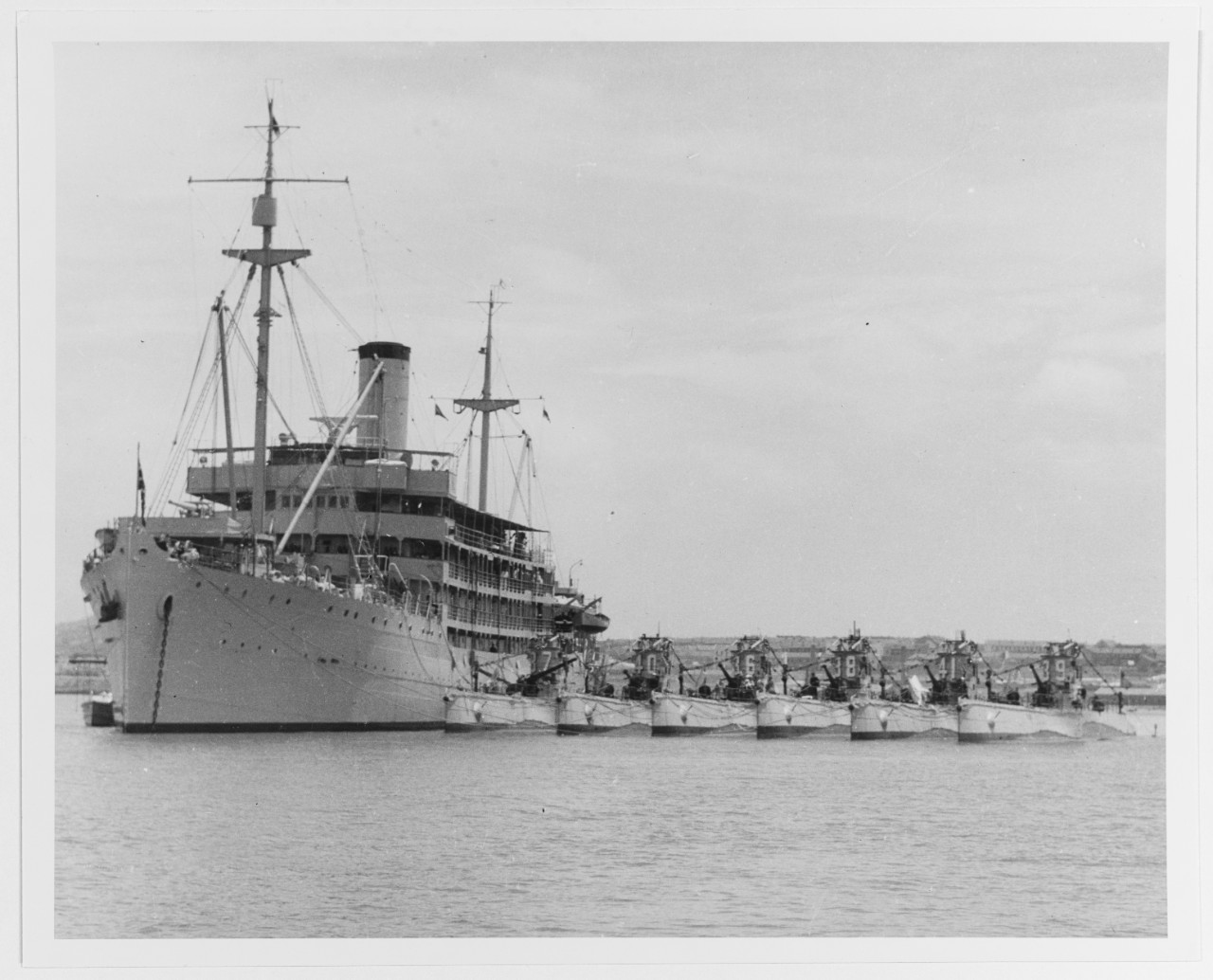
USS Canopus (AS-9) in 1932 with S-37; S-40; S-36; S-38; S-41; S-39 at Cavite

=== World War II, 1941–1942 ===
On 7 December 1941, Canopus, aging but able, lay at Cavite Navy Yard, as tender to Submarine Squadron 20. In the days that followed, her men worked day and night to repair ships damaged in the daily air raids as well as to keep her brood of submarines at sea. With the Army falling back on Manila, Canopus sailed to Mariveles Bay at the tip of Bataan on Christmas Day. On 29 December 1941 she received her first direct bomb hit. A 500-pound armor-piercing bomb penetrated all decks and exploded on the propeller shaft housing. Six sailors were killed mostly from scalding and fires started in the engine rooms and magazines. The six men were buried at sea at 1735 hours in Mariveles Bay at the tip of Bataan. On 1 January 1942 she received a second direct bomb hit. This time a fragmentation bomb which exploded near the top of the smokestack, resulting in substantial damage to the ship and injuries to 16 men of the gun crews.

Disguised as a bombed out, listing, abandoned hulk, smoke pots were placed around the ship and gave the appearance of an abandoned hulk by day, while the ship was active at night. Her crew worked and repaired the smaller ships also left behind and keeping the submarines in action. Just before the New Year, the last of the submarines left Canopus.

The crew continued to care for small craft and equipment of the Army and Navy, or were attached to the improvised naval battalion which fought on Bataan. The ship's launches were converted into miniature gunboats dubbed Mickey Mouse Battleships, and attacked the Japanese moving south near the shore. Upon the surrender of Bataan on the night of 8–9 April 1942, Canopus was ordered scuttled in Mariveles Bay, Bataan, to deny her use to the enemy. On 9 April, she was backed off into deep water under her own power and the crew scuttled the ship and abandoned ship.

Of the Canopus' crew, 221 were evacuated to Corregidor on 28 February 1942 and served with the Marines' 1st, 2nd, and 3rd Battalions on beach defenses. The final 327 crewmen were also evacuated to Corregidor and served in the 4th Marine Regiment's 4th Battalion Reserves (Provisional) which fought during the final battle for the island fortress. Nearly all Canopus crewmen were captured at the fall of Corregidor and spent the rest of the war in Japanese prisoner of war (POW) camps in the Philippines and the Asian mainland. Some of the captured crew were killed on 14 December 1944 in the Palawan massacre.

A total of 212 crewmen were declared killed or missing in action. In 1944, Japanese salvage ships Kamikaze Maru No. 7 and Kamikaze Maru No. 5 unsuccessfully tried to raise her.

On 3 May 1942, Canopus' former commanding officer, Commander (later Rear Admiral) Earl Sackett, was evacuated from Corregidor aboard the submarine USS Spearfish. After a perilous 17 day journey, Sackett arrived at Freemantle Harbour in Australia. He was then assigned as commander the submarine repair facility at San Diego and later served on the staff of Admiral Chester Nimitz at Pearl Harbor. Sackett retired from the Navy in January 1947.

== Awards ==
- Combat Action Ribbon
- Yangtze Service Medal
- China Service Medal
- American Defense Service Medal with "FLEET" clasp
- Asiatic–Pacific Campaign Medal with one battle star
- World War II Victory Medal
- Philippine Republic Presidential Unit Citation
- Philippine Defense Medal
