= USS S-40 =

Submarine of the United States

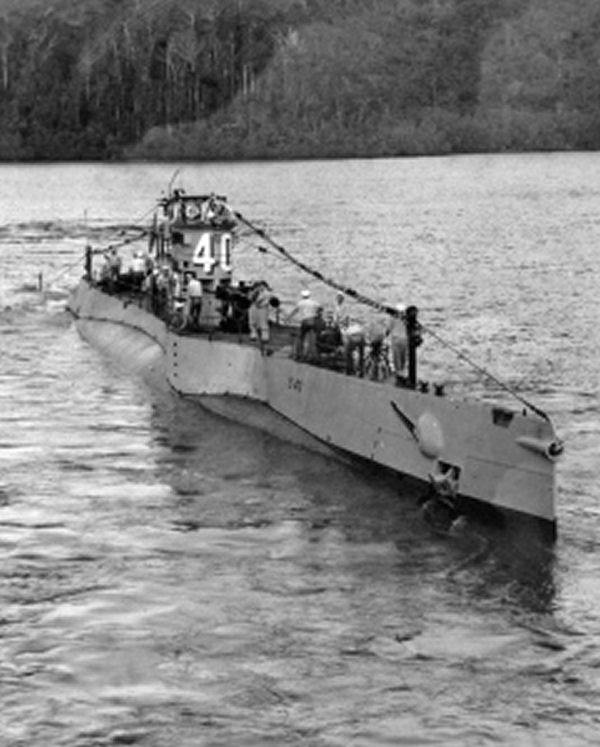
- USS S-40 in the 1930s, probably in the East Asia.

History

United States
- Name: USS S-40
- Builder: Bethlehem Shipbuilding Corporation, San Francisco, California
- Laid down: 5 March 1919
- Launched: 5 January 1921
- Sponsored by: Mrs. John H. Rosseter
- Commissioned: 20 November 1923
- Decommissioned: 29 October 1945
- Stricken: 13 November 1945
- Fate: Sold November 1946; Scrapped July 1947

General characteristics
- Class & type: S-class submarine
- Displacement: 854 long tons (868 t) surfaced; 1,062 long tons (1,079 t) submerged
- Length: 219 ft 3 in (66.83 m)
- Beam: 20 ft 8 in (6.30 m)
- Draft: 15 ft 11 in (4.85 m)
- Speed: 14.5 knots (16.7 mph; 26.9 km/h) surfaced; 11 knots (13 mph; 20 km/h) submerged
- Complement: 42 officers and men
- Armament: 1 × 4 in (102 mm)/50 deck gun; 4 × 21 inch (533 mm) torpedo tubes

Service record
- Operations: World War II
- Awards: 1 battle star

USS S-40 (SS-145) was a first-group (S-1 or "Holland") S-class submarine of the United States Navy.

== Construction and commissioning ==
S-40′s keel was laid down on 5 March 1919 by the Bethlehem Shipbuilding Corporation in San Francisco, California. She was launched on 5 January 1921, sponsored by Mrs. John H. Rosseter, and commissioned on 20 November 1923.

== Service history ==
=== Asiatic Fleet ===
Assigned to Submarine Division 17 on commissioning, S-40 operated off Southern California until January 1924, when she proceeded to Panama, thence continued into the Caribbean Sea. Engaging in Fleet Problems II, III, and IV en route to and during her stay there, she returned to San Diego, California, in late March. In May, she completed her final trial runs at San Francisco, then prepared for transfer to the Asiatic Fleet.

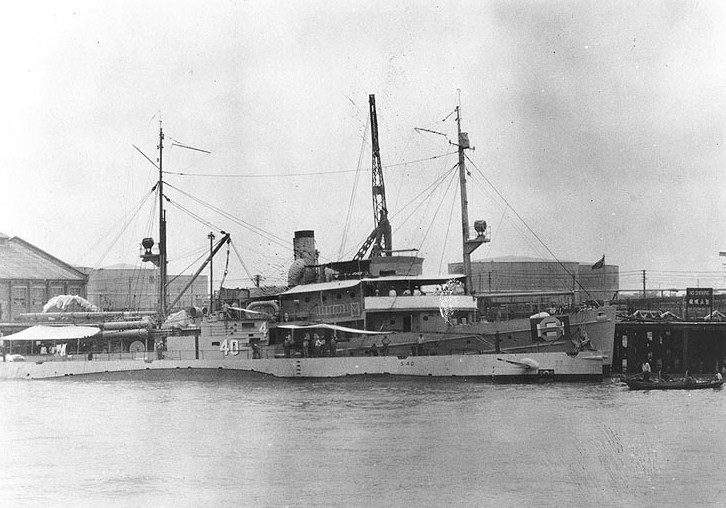
S-40 alongside submarine rescue vessel USS Pigeon (ASR-6) at Shanghai, China, in 1932.

S-40 departed San Francisco, with her division, on 17 September and arrived at Manila on 5 November. During the winter of 1925, she conducted exercises in sound and target approaches, crash dives, and torpedo firing in the waters off Luzon. In May, she moved north with her division to Tsingtao, China, and, through the summer, engaged in operations off the China coast. In September, she returned to the Philippines, and, for the next fifteen years, maintained a schedule of overhaul, exercises, and patrols in the Philippines during the winter and operations off China during the summer.

During the summer of 1940, however, hostilities on the Asiatic mainland brought a change in her schedule and she conducted increasingly extended "familiarization" cruises among the Philippine Islands and in adjacent waters. With 1941, joint United States Army-United States Navy exercises were conducted at Corregidor, and patrols off likely invasion beaches were stepped up.

=== World War II ===
==== First and Second War Patrols, December 1941 ====
On 8 December (7 December east of the International Date Line) S-40 was anchored off Sangley Point alongside the submarine tender USS Canopus. With the receipt of the news of the Japanese attack on Pearl Harbor, she was ordered out on patrol. Under the command of Lieut. Nicholas Lucker, Jr. on 9 December, she anchored off Boaya Point, Veradero Bay, on 10 December, and, with a lookout stationed on a nearby hill, watched the approaches to the Verde Island passage between Mindoro and Luzon. On 12 December, she shifted to an area off Batangas, and, on 14 December, returned to Veradero Bay. On 18 December, she was back at Manila, only to depart again on 19 December to patrol between Botolan Point and Subic Bay. On 21 December, she headed north to intercept a Japanese force reportedly bound for the Lingayen area.

Early on 23 December, S-40 sighted the enemy; fired four torpedoes, unsuccessfully, at a transport, then, for much of the remainder of the day, remained submerged, avoiding depth charges dropped by the Japanese screening forces. After dark, she anchored in Agno Bay; made temporary repairs to her hull, engines, pumping system, and port air compressor; then patrolled off Bolinao. On 29 December, she was ordered to head south. Manila and Cavite had become untenable.

==== Escape from the Philippines ====
On 30 December, three days before Manila and Cavite fell, S-40 departed Luzon and pointed her bow toward the Netherlands East Indies. By midnight on 8 January 1942, she was off Makassar, whence she was ordered to Balikpapan for repairs, fuel, and supplies. There, enemy air attacks increased, but repairs were accomplished, fuel was taken on, and limited supplies were received. On 14 January, she took up patrol duties on the North Watcher-Mangkalihat line. By 19 January, her food supplies were again low, but she continued her efforts to impede the Japanese envelopment of the East Indies. On 20 January, she took up patrol off Balikpapan. On 25 January, she was ordered back to Makassar. Thence, on 28 January, she headed for Soerabaja to join the American-British-Dutch-Australian (ABDA) forces operating from that still-Allied base.

==== Third War Patrol, February 1942 ====
She arrived at Soerabaja on the north coast of Java on 2 February, her crew frustrated by their attempts to intercept enemy shipping, but with information on tides, currents, navigational aids, and Japanese tactics. Nine days later, she got underway to patrol the northern approaches to Makassar City and intercept Japanese reinforcements expected to move through Makassar Strait and the Flores Sea. Arriving on 15 February, she patrolled initially between De Bril bank and the reefs to the south, then shifted to other areas. Her hunting remained unsuccessful.

By 26 February, she was again in need of repairs and was ordered to Exmouth Gulf on the Western Australia coast. There, she took on needed supplies and continued on to Fremantle. On 6 March, she sighted a Japanese submarine, but was able neither to attack nor to transmit a message concerning its presence.

==== Fourth War Patrol, May 1942 ====
On 9 March, S-40 reached Fremantle. During the next month and a half, she underwent overhaul and shifted her base to Brisbane, Queensland. On 4 May, she departed the Queensland coast for her fourth war patrol. Ordered into the New Britain-New Ireland area, she reconnoitered Deboyne en route and arrived on station on 16 May. On 3 June, she returned to Brisbane again with information, but still scoreless.

==== Fifth War Patrol, June 1942 ====
At the end of the month, she was underway again. Initially assigned to intercept enemy traffic into the Salamaua-Lae area of New Guinea, she was ordered to the Solomon Islands on 2 July to relieve S-38, which had been forced to vacate her position off Tulagi. S-40 patrolled between Tulagi and Lunga Roads and off Savo Island; fired on a maru, but did not score; then shifted to the New Georgia-Santa Isabel area to intercept Rabaul shipping. Failing to directly impede Japanese traffic there, she returned to Australia on 29 July.

==== Sixth War Patrol, August 1942 ====
On 28 August, S-40 again cleared Moreton Bay and moved north. By 4 September, she was off the Gizo Island anchorage. Thence, she crossed the Solomon Sea to the D'Entrecasteaux Islands off Papua to impede the movement of enemy reinforcements into Milne Bay. Poor weather and mechanical problems inhibited her hunting; and, still scoreless, she returned to Brisbane on 25 September.

==== Seventh War Patrol, October 1942 ====
Repairs to S-40’s deteriorating main motor cables and attempts to correct fuel leaks into the after battery occupied the next three weeks. On 19 October, she got underway for San Diego and an extensive overhaul. Patrolling in the Gilbert Islands en route, she arrived at Pearl Harbor on 19 November; exchanged her four-inch (102 mm) gun for a three-inch (76 mm) gun from submarine Whale and continued on to the west coast, arriving on 7 December. Delays in the delivery of needed equipment slowed the yard work; but on 4 June 1943, she emerged with air conditioning and more up to date electronic equipment.

==== Eighth War Patrol, June 1943 ====
On 7 June, she moved north, toward the Aleutian Islands, with 60% of her crew new to the Navy and to submarines. She trained en route to Dutch Harbor, whence she departed on her eighth war patrol on 24 June. Further training exercises were carried out prior to reaching Attu, where she topped off and departed again on 30 June, heading for the Kuril Islands. Despite dense fog and heavy seas, she reached the Kamchatka peninsula on 3 July and stood down the coast toward Paramushiro.

Japanese fishermen, with their innumerable nets and set lines, hindered her freedom of movement. Dense fog impeded her hunting. On 12 July, she suffered a steering casualty which was temporarily repaired by the crew; and, on 31 July, she put back into Dutch Harbor.

==== Ninth War Patrol, August 1943 ====
S-40’s ninth war patrol, from 12 August to 10 September, was again conducted in the fog and heavy swells of the northern Kurile Islands, but was cut short by repeated material failures which included the seemingly ever present problems of deterioration of the main power cables and fuel oil leaks into the after battery.

=== Training ship, 1943-1945 ===
After voyage repairs, the S-boat was ordered to San Diego and training duty. Reporting to Commander, Submarine Squadron 45 on arrival on 3 October 1943, she conducted training operations for the West Coast Sound School and for Fleet Air, West Coast for the remainder of World War II. Then ordered inactivated, she shifted to San Francisco where she was stripped and decommissioned on 29 October 1945. Struck from the Naval Vessel Register on 13 November 1945, she was sold to the Salco Iron and Metal Company of San Francisco in November 1946 and was scrapped in July 1947.

== Awards ==
- Yangtze Service Medal
- China Service Medal
- American Defense Service Medal
- American Campaign Medal
- Asiatic-Pacific Campaign Medal with one battle star
- World War II Victory Medal
- Philippine Presidential Unit Citation
- Philippine Defense Medal with star
