= Lacrizeomic =

Studio album by JUL
- Released: 16 June 2014
- Recorded: 2013–2014
- Label: Liga One Industry / Musicast

JUL chronology
Dans ma paranoïa (2014)	Lacrizeomic (2014)	Je tourne en Rond (2015)

Singles from Lacrizeomic
- 1. "Briganté" Released: May 2014

Lacrizeomic' (pron. "La Crise au Mic" [la kʁiz o majk]) is the second studio album by French Marseille-based hip hop artist Jul and his follow-up to his debut album Dans ma paranoïa. It was released on the independent label Liga One Industry / Musicast on 16 June 2014 just four months after the release of the debut album on 24 February 2014. The 18-track album contains three collaborations with other artists, namely GP, Houari and Saiah, and three artists on the label, who had appeared in Paranoïa being Kalif, Soso Maness and Kamikaze return with their separate tracks (16 to 18).

== Track list ==
1. "Anti BDH" (3:14)
2. "Ça veut ton cash" (2:43)
3. "Briganté" (3:20)
4. "Je profite" (2:02)
5. "Loin" (feat. GP) (4:41)
6. "L'histoire" (3:37)
7. "N'imite pas" (3:24)
8. "On survit (feat. Houari) (3:26)
9. "Posé à la place 2" (feat. Saiah) (4:46)
10. "Pour un rien" (3:59)
11. "Regardes pas de travers" (3:17)
12. "Ça me dégoûte" (3:46)
13. "Sens interdit" (3:46)
14. "T'as coulé" (4:53)
15. "Terter" (feat. Font-Vert) (4:59)
16. "Au top" by Kalif (3:33)
17. "On squatte le béton" by Kamikaz (4:04)
18. "Neymar" by Soso Maness (3:37)

== Charts ==
=== Weekly charts ===
Chart (2014)	Peak position
Belgian Albums (Ultratop Wallonia)	69
French Albums (SNEP)	4

=== Year-end charts ===
Chart (2014)	Position
French Albums (SNEP)	62
