= Dans ma paranoïa =

Studio album by JUL
- Released: 24 February 2014
- Recorded: 2013–2014
- Label: Liga One Industry / Musicast

JUL chronology
Dans ma paranoïa (2014)	Lacrizeomic (2014)

Singles from Dans ma paranoïa
- 1. "Dans ma paranoïa" Released: February 2014

Dans ma paranoïa (pronounced [dɑ̃ ma paʁanɔja]) is the debut album of Marseille-based French hip hop artist Jul. It was released on the independent record label Liga One Industry / Musicast on 24 February 2014. The 17-track album contains four collaborations with other artists on the label, two with Kalif Hardcore, and one each with Soso Maness and Kamikaz.

== Track list ==
1. "Winners" (2:04)
2. "Malade" (feat. Kalif Hardcore) (3:33)
3. "Dans mon dél" (3:29)
4. "Grillé" (2:56)
5. "J'oublie tout" (5:16)
6. "Au quartier" (3:19)
7. "Jeune de cité" (feat. Soso Maness) (4:07)
8. "Sort le cross volé" (4:18)
9. "N'importe quoi" (4:11)
10. "Dans ma paranoïa" (2:40)
11. "Tu la love" (3:32)
12. "T'es pas le seul" (feat. Kamikaz) (3:36)
13. "C'est trop" (2:43)
14. "Audi volée" (feat. Kalif Hardcore) (3:28)
15. "Tout seul" (2:27)
16. "Le sang" (4:43)
17. "Mon son vient d'ailleurs" (3:56)

== Charts ==
=== Weekly charts ===
Chart (2014)	Peak position
Belgian Albums (Ultratop Wallonia)	72
French Albums (SNEP)	7

=== Year-end charts ===
Chart (2014)	Position
French Albums (SNEP)	35
