= Japanese destroyer Kamikaze =

Two destroyers of the Imperial Japanese Navy have been named Kamikaze:

- Japanese destroyer Kamikaze (1905), a Kamikaze-class destroyer of the Imperial Japanese Navy launched on July 15, 1905.
- Japanese destroyer Kamikaze (1922), a Kamikaze-class destroyer of the Imperial Japanese Navy launched on September 25, 1922.

== See also ==
- Kamikaze (disambiguation)
- Kamikaze-class destroyer
