= Kamikaze-class destroyer =

Kamikaze-class destroyer may refer to:

- Kamikaze-class destroyer (1905), 32 destroyers for the Imperial Japanese Navy which were built in 1904–1909, and were in commission from 1905 to 1928.
- Kamikaze-class destroyer (1922), 9 destroyers for the Imperial Japanese Navy which were built in 1921 to 1925, and were in commission from 1922 to 1947.

== See also ==
- Kamikaze (disambiguation)
- Japanese destroyer Kamikaze
