= Street Réalité =

Studio album by Kamikaz
- Released: 27 April 2015
- Recorded: 2014–2015
- Genre: Rap
- Label: Liga One Industry / Musicast

Singles from Street Réalité
- 1. "Dans mes rêves" Released: April 2015

Street Réalité, full title Liga One Industry presente Kamikaz - Street Réalité is the debut studio album of Marseille-based French rapper Kamikaz released on 27 April 2015 on Liga One Industry / Musicast French record label following the release of Kamikaz' mixtape Le reflet de la rue. In the album, Kamikaz Sofiane has collaborations with other rap / urban acts like Lartiste, Malaa, Jul, Veazy the two latter also signed artists for Liga One Industry founded by Kalif Hardcore et Tota based on rappers in Southern France.

== Track list ==
1. "Intro" (3:19)
2. "Street réalité" (3:35)
3. "Dans mes rêves" (feat. Jul) (4:20)
4. "Routine" (3:45)
5. "Tu veux nous teste" (feat. Veazy) (4:12)
6. "On a qu'une vie" (3:19)
7. "Attentat vocal" (3:26)
8. "Je t'en veux pas" (3:55)
9. "La rue m'a bercé" (feat. Lartiste) (4:04)
10. "Blindé" (4:30)
11. "Seul contre tous" (4:37)
12. "Tu n'étais pas là" (3:57)
13. "S'évader" (3:41)
14. "Le monde est malade" (3:33)
15. "Hendek y'a les condés" (feat. Malaa) (4:00)
16. "Aller aller" (4:04)
17. "J'ai perdu mon temps" (4:12)

== Charts ==
Chart (2013)	Peak position
French Albums (SNEP)	33
