= Japanese salvage ship Kamikaze Maru No. 7 =

History

Empire of Japan
- Name: Kamikaze Maru No. 7
- Builder: Matsuura Shipbuilding
- Launched: December 1940
- Acquired: requisitioned by Imperial Japanese Navy, 24 February 1942
- Homeport: Sasebo
- Identification: 48627
- Fate: unknown
- Notes: Call sign: JHXP

General characteristics
- Type: schooner
- Tonnage: 208 GRT
- Length: 29.5 m (96 ft 9 in)
- Beam: 7.7 m (25 ft 3 in)
- Draught: 3.5 m (11 ft 6 in)

Kamikaze Maru No. 7 (Japanese: 第七神風丸) was a wood-hulled schooner that served as an auxiliary salvage and repair ship of the Imperial Japanese Navy during World War II.

== History ==
Kamikaze Maru No. 7 was laid down at the Sasebo shipyard of Matsuura Shipbuilding (松浦造船所) at the behest of Kojiro Linuma (飯沼耕次郎). She was wood-hulled. Kamikaze Maru No. 7 was launched and named in December 1940. On 24 February 1942, she was requisitioned by the Imperial Japanese Navy for service as a salvage ship and assigned to the Sasebo Naval District. On 1 April 1942, she departed Sasebo arriving on 13 April 1942 at Hong Kong where she assisted in salvaging the many vessels scuttled by the fleeing British forces during the Battle of Hong Kong.

In May 1943, she departed Hong Kong for patrol duty in the Sunda Strait and before arriving at various ports to conduct further salvage operations: Jakarta (20 July 1943), Surabaya (18 August 1943), Lingayen Gulf (22 September 1943) where she repaired the general cargo ship Nisui Maru which had hit a mine, Manila (27 November 1943) where she assisted in salvaging the many vessels scuttled by the fleeing American forces after the Battle of Corregidor, Batangas (7 March 1944) where she conducted salvage work on the cargo ship Urayasu Maru. Thereafter she visited various ports in the Philippines and Indonesia before returning to Manila on 25 April 1944 where she met up with her fellow salvage ship Kamikaze Maru No. 5 and attempted to raise the USS Canopus which had been scuttled in Mariveles Bay on the Bataan peninsula across from Corregidor.

She survived the war; her ultimate fate is unknown.
