= Jul (rapper) =

French rapper and singer (born 1990)

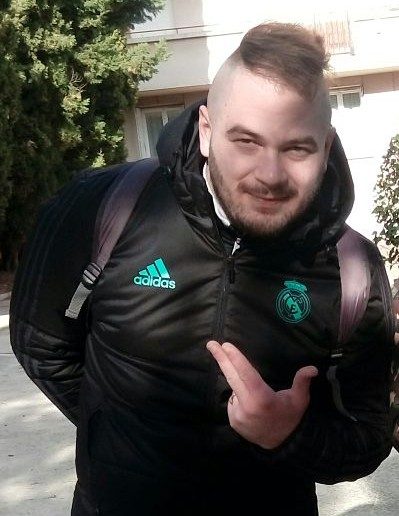
- Jul in 2018

Background information
- Also known as: Le J, L'Ovni, La Machine
- Born: Julien François Alain Mari; 14 January 1990 (age 36); Marseille, France
- Genres: Hip hop, hip-house
- Years active: 2010–present
- Label: D'Or et de Platine

Julien Mari (French pronunciation: [ʒyljɛ̃ maʁi], born 14 January 1990), better known as Jul (/dʒuːl/, stylized as JuL and in all caps), is a French rapper, singer, and producer. He has been the most-streamed artist on Spotify in France for five consecutive years (2021-2025) and is frequently among the top streamed artists in Belgium, Morocco, and other countries.

In February 2020, he became the biggest record seller in the history of French rap with more than 4 million albums sold at the age of 30, and in six years of career. As of December 2025, Jul has sold over 10 million albums globally, becoming the first French rapper to reach this milestone.

== Biography ==
Julien François Alain Mari was born on 14 January 1990 in the 12th arrondissement of Marseille. Jul is of Algerian-Kabyle and Corsican descent. From his childhood to the beginning of his career, he lived in Saint-Jean du Désert, he went to school in the university of Marseille, in the 5th arrondissement of Marseille.

== Career ==
Jul released his first single "Sors le cross volé" in November 2013. On 24 February 2014, he released his debut album, "Dans ma paranoïa" on the independent label Liga One Industry. It was the first of a prolific series. Since the beginning of his career, he has released at least two LPs per year, all reaching the platinum certification or greater. His debut was followed by "Lacrizeomic" and "Je trouve pas le sommeil". All three have reached the French SNEP official albums chart.

In 2015, Jul left Liga One Industry following disagreements with the label, and then independently released his albums under his own created label "D'Or et de Platine". In 2017, his album "My World" won the "Urban Music Album of the Year" at the 32nd Victoires de la Musique. In February 2020, he became the best-selling artist in French rap history. By the age of 30 and within a career with a spanning just 6 years, he has sold more than 4 million albums. In January 2023, it was announced that Jul's record label D'Or et de Platine had become the sleeve sponsor of his local and childhood football club, Olympique de Marseille. On 8 May 2024, Jul lit the Paris 2024 Olympic cauldron as the flame reached French soil in Marseille.

== Discography ==
=== Albums ===
Year	Album	Peak positions				Certification
Year	Album	FRA	BEL (Fl)	BEL (Wa)	SWI	Certification
2014	Dans ma paranoïa	7	—	56	—	SNEP: Platinum
2014	Lacrizeomic	4	—	69	—	
2014	Je trouve pas le sommeil	10	—	76	—	
2015	Jul	—	—	—	—	
2015	Je tourne en rond	2	118	21	—	
2015	My World	1	—	21	—	SNEP: Diamond
2016	Émotions	1	181	3	—	SNEP: Diamond
2016	Album gratuit	—	—	—	—	SNEP: 2× Platinum
2016	L'ovni	1	—	11	52	SNEP: Diamond
2017	Je ne me vois pas briller	1	174	2	24	SNEP: 3× Platinum
2017	La tête dans les nuages	4	—	21	51	SNEP: 3× Platinum
2018	Inspi d'ailleurs	1	189	4	20	SNEP: 3× Platinum
2018	La zone en personne	2	175	22	50	SNEP: 3× Platinum
2019	Rien 100 rien	2	56	4	13	SNEP: Diamond
2019	C'est pas des LOL	1	—	17	20	SNEP: 3× Platinum
2020	La machine	1	42	1	3	SNEP: 3× Platinum
2020	Loin du monde	—	45	7	17	SNEP: 2× Platinum
2021	Album gratuit, vol. 6	4	—	18	—	SNEP: Gold
2021	Demain ça ira	1	20	1	5	SNEP: 3× Platinum
2021	Indépendance	4	71	9	13	SNEP: 2× Platinum
2022	Extraterrestre	1	98	1	4	SNEP: 3× Platinum
2022	Cœur Blanc	1	140	3	3	SNEP: 3× Platinum
2023	Album gratuit, vol. 7	—	—	125	—	
2023	C'est quand qu'il s'éteint ?	1	186	1	5	SNEP: 2× Platinum
2023	Le route est longue	1	196	2	3	SNEP: 2× Platinum
2024	Décennie	1	—	2	7	SNEP: Platinum
2024	Mise à jour	1	114	4	7	SNEP: Platinum
2024	Inarrêtable	1	—	—	—	SNEP: Platinum
2025	D&P à vie	1	71	3	4	SNEP: 3× Platinum
2025	Album gratuit, vol. 8	—	—	—	—	
2025	TP sur TP	1	—	9	6	
2026	Oubliez-moi	1	—	9	7	

=== Singles ===
Year	Title	Peak positions			Album
Year	Title	FRA	BEL (Wa)	SWI	Album
2014	"Dans ma paranoïa"	23	36* (Ultratip)	—	Dans ma paranoïa
2014	"Briganté"	20	—	—	Lacrizeomic
2014	"Señora"	24	—	—	Je trouve pas le sommeil
2014	"Je trouve pas le sommeil"	41	—	—	Je trouve pas le sommeil
2015	"Je tourne en rond"	28	—	—	Je tourne en rond
2015	"Normal" (with Alonzo)	7	34* (Ultratip)	—	Capo Dei Capi
2015	"Fais le moonwalk" (with DJ Abdel and Soprano)	50	40* (Ultratip)	—	—N/a
2015	"En Y"	14	—	—	My World
2015	"Lova"	22	—	—	My World
2015	"Encore des paroles" (feat. Julie Gonzalez)	24	—	—	My World
2016	"My World"	10	—	—	My World & My World [collector's edition]
2016	"Émotions"	15	—	—	Émotions
2016	"Allez le sang"	57	—	—	Émotions
2016	"Tchikita"	3	39	—	Album Gratuit Vol. 2
2016	"On m'appelle l'ovni"	18	—	—	Non-album singles
2016	"C'est le son de la gratte"	63	—	—	Non-album singles
2017	"Je ne me vois pas briller"	25	—	—	Je ne me vois pas briller
2017	"Ma jolie"	20	—	—	Je ne me vois pas briller
2017	"Cagoulé" (feat. Kalash Criminel)	159	—	—	Je ne me vois pas briller
2017	"La tête dans les nuages"	38	—	—	La tête dans les nuages
2017	"Henrico"	145	—	—	La tête dans les nuages
2018	"Toto et Ninetta"	1	—	—	Inspi d'ailleurs
2019	"Pocahontas"	63	—	—	Album gratuit (Vol. 5)
2019	"C'est pas des LOL"	30	—	—	C'est pas des LOL
2019	"Ibiza" (featuring Jimmy Sax)	9	—	—	C'est pas des LOL
2019	"Moulaga" (with Heuss l'Enfoiré)	2	13	—	—N/a
2020	"Sousou"	3	—	—	—N/a
2020	"Italia"	2	41	56	—N/a
2020	"Bande organisée" (with SCH, Naps, Kofs, Elams, Solda, Houari and Soso Maness)	1	2	7	—N/a
2020	"Mother Fuck" (with SCH)	1	38	51	Loin du monde
2021	"GJS" (with Gims & SCH)	41	—	—	
2021	"Sapapaya" (with SCH and L'Algérino)	7	—	—	non-album release
2021	"La Miss"	19	—	—	Indépendance
2022	"J'ai tout su"	2	39	—	Extraterrestre
2022	"Namek" (featuring Omah Lay)	2	50	42	Cœur Blanc
2022	"Canette Dans Les Mains"	8	—	—	Cœur Blanc
2023	"La Bandite"	77	—	—	Non-album singles
2023	"La Faille"	2	—	—	Non-album singles
2023	"Se grita" (with Morad)	—	50	—	Reinsertado
2023	"J'fais que danser"	18	—	—	La route est longue
2023	"J'fais plaisir à la zone" (featuring SDM)	2	43	—	La route est longue
2024	"Oh qu'elle est belle" (featuring Dystinct)	8	36	—	Non-album singles
2024	"Il pleut des balles"	15	—	—	Non-album singles
2024	"Sous la lune"	3	12	—	Non-album singles
2024	"Capata"	7	—	—	Non-album singles
2025	"Phénoménal"	1	29	62	Non-album singles
2025	"Air Force blanche" (with Gims)	1	9	—	
2025	"Corazon" (with Gims)	20	—	—	
2025	"Toi et moi"	6	45	—	
2025	"Nostaligique"	11	—	—	TP sur TP
2026	"Parasite"	13	—	—	Oubliez-moi

*Did not appear in the official Belgian Ultratop 50 charts, but rather in the bubbling under Ultratip charts.

=== Featured in ===
Year	Album	Peak positions	Certifications	Album
Year	Album	FR	Certifications	Album
2014	"Problèmes" (Kenza Farah feat. Jul)	55		Kenza Farah album Karismatik
2014	"Fidèle à ma team" (DJ Kayz feat. Jul)	136		DJ Kayz album Paris-Oran-New York
2015	"Dans mes rêves" (Kamikaz feat. Jul)	124		Kamikaz album Street Réalité
2016	"La zone" (Hooss feat. Jul)	126		Hoos album French Riviera Vol. 2
2016	"Ça les dérange" (Vitaa feat. Jul)	11		
2016	"Ils le savent" (Alonzo feat. Jul)	35		Alonzo album Avenue de St. Antoine
2016	"Maria Maria" (Ghetto Phénomène feat. Jul)	38		
2016	"Boucan" (Maître Gims feat. Jul & DJ Last One)	21	SNEP: Platinum	Maître Gims album Mon cœur avait raison
2016	"En chaleur" (Ghetto Phénomène feat. Jul)	75		
2017	"Je ne comprends pas" (Kalash Criminel feat. Jul)	78		
2017	"Copacabana" (Ghetto Phénomène feat. Jul)	200		
2018	"T'es pas la même" (YL feat. Jul)	184		
2018	"Ça y est" (Marwa Loud feat. Jul)	67		
2020	"Dybala" (Maes feat. Jul)	3		
2020	"Pirelli" (Mister V feat. Jul)	9		
2020	"CNLZ" (Soolking feat. Jul & Kliff)	68		Soolking album Vintage
2020	"L'étoile sur le maillot" (L'Algérino – Alonzo – Stone Black – Le Rat Luciano – Sch – Jul – As – Veazy)	3		13 Organisé
2020	"13 balles" (Kofs – Moh – 100 Blaze – Jul – Naps – Dadinho – A-Deal – Zak & Diego)	4		13 Organisé
2020	"Combien" (Many – Jul – Solda – Moubarak – Soprano – Elams – Soso Maness – Veazy – Jhonson)	6		13 Organisé
2020	"Ma gadji" (Kofs – Oussagaza – Don Choa – SAF – Soso Maness – 2Bang – Le Rat Luciano – Jul)	10		13 Organisé
2020	"Je suis Marseille" (Akhenaton – Jul – L'Algérino – Alonzo – Shurik'n – Fahar – SCH – Le Rat Luciano)	12		13 Organisé
2020	"War Zone" (Thabiti – Naps – Alonzo – Houari – Jul – As – Zbig – AM La Scampia)	14		13 Organisé
2020	"Tout a changé" (Le Rat Luciano – Soprano – Jul – L'Algérino – Sysa – Solda – Menzo – Stone Black – Fahar)	18		13 Organisé
2020	"Partout c'est la même" (SAF – Jul – As – Elams – Fahar – Friz – Vincenzo – Drime)	20		13 Organisé
2020	"C'est maintenant" (Sat l'Artificier – Alonzo – Kofs – Naps – Sch – Jul – Kamikaz – L'Algérino)	21		13 Organisé
2020	"Miami Vice" (Thabiti – Sysa – Drime – Jul – Kamikaz – Zbig – Moubarak)	25		13 Organisé
2020	"Heat" (Keny Arkana – Graya – 100 Blaze – Sauzer – Jul – Elams – Sat l'Artificier – Banguiz)	30		13 Organisé
2020	"La nuit" (Tonyno – Soso Maness – Kara – Jul – Jazzy Jazz – Bilk – Fahar – Kamikaz – Djiha)	30		13 Organisé
2020	"Dans la zone" (Kalash Criminel feat Jul)	19		Kalsh Criminel album Sélection naturelle
2021	"La seleçao" (Alonzo feat. Jul & Naps)	2		Alonzo album Capo dei capi – Vol. II & III
2021	"Je veux" (Kamikaz feat. Jul)	130		Kamikaz album Sofiane
2021	"On va où" (L'Algérino feat. Jul)	101		Kamikaz album Sofiane
2021	"C'est ma vie" (Sasso feat. Jul)	98		
2021	"Avengers" (Naps feat. Jul, SCH & Kalif Hardcore)	12		Naps album Best Life
2025	"Zou Bisou" (Theodora featuring Jul)	9		

=== Other charting songs ===
Year	Title	Peak positions	Album
Year	Title	FRA	Album
2014	"J'oublie tout"	58	Dans ma paranoïa
2014	"Tu la love"	72	Dans ma paranoïa
2014	"Sort le cross volé"	73	Dans ma paranoïa
2014	"Ça me dégoûte"	81	Lacrizeomic
2014	"Nique-le"	92	Je trouve pas le sommeil
2014	"J'm'évade"	77	Je trouve pas le sommeil
2014	"Marseille – Paris" (with Mister You)	86	Je trouve pas le sommeil
2014	"La fusée"	81	Je trouve pas le sommeil
2015	"Je peux pas me les blairer"	69	
2015	"Jack Miel"	72	Je tourne en rond
2015	"Lady"	58	Je tourne en rond
2015	"Goodbye"	83	Je tourne en rond
2015	"Ils sont jaloux" (feat. Liga One, Friz, Kamikaz, Bilk, Houari & Veazy)	85	Je tourne en rond
2015	"Gros"	87	Je tourne en rond
2015	"Wesh alors"	25	My World
2015	"Amnésia"	30	My World
2015	"Mama"	38	My World
2015	"Dans la légende"	62	My World
2015	"Mamasita"	63	My World
2015	"Dans l'appart"	97	My World
2015	"Ils m'ignorent"	100	My World
2016	"Coucou"	16	My World [collector's edition]
2016	"Elle te balade"	3	My World [collector's edition]
2016	"C'est chaud"	14	My World [collector's edition]
2016	"Du jour au lendemain"	24	My World [collector's edition]
2016	"Le patron"	10	My World [collector's edition]
2016	"Mon bijou"	16	Emotions
2016	"La classe"	41	Emotions
2016	"On est trop" (featuring Ghetto Phénomène)	80	Emotions
2016	"Elle et l'autre"	68	L'ovni
2016	"Je fais le sourd"	95	L'ovni
2017	"Je vais t'oublier" (featuring Marwa Loud)	52	La tête dans les nuages
2018	"Fais-mois la passe"	40	Inspi d'ailleurs
2018	"Inspi d'ailleurs"	44	Inspi d'ailleurs
2018	"Pim pom" (featuring Shay)	45	Inspi d'ailleurs
2018	"Quelqu'un d'autre t'aimera"	77	Inspi d'ailleurs
2018	"Tout grailler"	98	Inspi d'ailleurs
2019	"Gilera"	128	Album gratuit (Vol. 5)
2019	"On se régale"	160	Album gratuit (Vol. 5)
2019	"Tel Me" (featuring Ninho)	3	Rien 100 rien
2019	"JCVD"	4	Rien 100 rien
2019	"La bandite"	9	Rien 100 rien
2019	"Salvatrucha"	11	Rien 100 rien
2019	"Tokyo"	15	Rien 100 rien
2019	"Sous la lune"	20	Rien 100 rien
2019	"BDG"	25	Rien 100 rien
2019	"GTA" (featuring Heuss l'Enfoiré)	29	Rien 100 rien
2019	"J'suis loin" (featuring Vald)	31	Rien 100 rien
2019	"Professor"	32	Rien 100 rien
2019	"Hey"	39	Rien 100 rien
2019	"Pas de love" (featuring TK)	42	Rien 100 rien
2019	"Je parle pas chinois"	46	Rien 100 rien
2019	"Mademoiselle"	55	Rien 100 rien
2019	"Bagarre"	63	Rien 100 rien
2019	"Faux poto"	66	Rien 100 rien
2019	"La folie du ter ter" (featuring La Famax)	67	Rien 100 rien
2019	"Sakakini"	68	Rien 100 rien
2019	"La machine"	79	Rien 100 rien
2019	"Fatigué" (featuring Mubarak)	81	Rien 100 rien
2019	"Papa maman"	82	Rien 100 rien
2019	"Je fais mon tour"	95	Rien 100 rien
2019	"Ratata" (featuring Mula B)	101	Rien 100 rien
2019	"T'as tout perdu"	94	Rien 100 rien (Réédition)
2019	"Like Ya"	102	Rien 100 rien (Réédition)
2019	"Africa Twin"	106	Rien 100 rien (Réédition)
2019	"J'ai tout donné"	116	Rien 100 rien (Réédition)
2019	"Bruce Lee"	120	Rien 100 rien (Réédition)
2019	"Quoi que je fasse"	170	Rien 100 rien (Réédition)
2019	"Avant la douane"	124	
2019	"Mon bébé d'amour"	12	C'est pas des LOL
2019	"6.35"	19	C'est pas des LOL
2019	"Beuh magique"	23	C'est pas des LOL
2019	"Mexico"	24	C'est pas des LOL
2019	"Pow wow"	29	C'est pas des LOL
2019	"Cremosso"	35	C'est pas des LOL
2019	"Santchelita"	36	C'est pas des LOL
2019	"La doudoune"	43	C'est pas des LOL
2019	"Bouge-moi de là" (feat. Gips, Houari GP, Le K, Gambi, TK, Moubarak, Miklo, A-Deal & Kamikaz)	52	C'est pas des LOL
2019	"Faut que je me tire de là"	55	C'est pas des LOL
2019	"Tant pis pour toi"	63	C'est pas des LOL
2019	"Au péage"	68	C'est pas des LOL
2019	"Ça tombe pas du ciel"	74	C'est pas des LOL
2019	"Dans le club"	79	C'est pas des LOL
2019	"Oh maman"	81	C'est pas des LOL
2019	"Un casse"	85	C'est pas des LOL
2019	"Y'a la police" (feat. Gips, Moubarak & TK)	88	C'est pas des LOL
2019	"Cassage de nuques, Pt. 3"	102	C'est pas des LOL
2019	"Collé au mic"	106	C'est pas des LOL
2019	"Crocodile"	109	C'est pas des LOL
2019	"Ça a tiré"	110	C'est pas des LOL
2019	"Ça mange la barre"	119	C'est pas des LOL
2019	"J'm'en bats les couilles"	121	C'est pas des LOL
2019	"Flu"	150	C'est pas des LOL
2019	"Nia"	176	C'est pas des LOL
2019	"Le combat"	186	C'est pas des LOL
2019	"T'es un gonflé"	193	C'est pas des LOL
2019	"Touloutoutou"	199	C'est pas des LOL
2019	"Je mets le way" (feat. Vladimir Cauchemar)	200	C'est pas des LOL
2020	"Fait d'or"	19	La machine
2020	"Folie"	3	La machine
2020	"Loin de tout" (feat. Wejdene)	4	Loin du monde
2020	"La pharmacie"	6	Loin du monde
2020	"La passat"	9	Loin du monde
2020	"Brouncha"	10	Loin du monde
2020	"Sous terre"	14	Loin du monde
2020	"Guytoune" (feat. Naps)	16	Loin du monde
2020	"Son ex"	17	Loin du monde
2020	"Dors on te piétine" (feat. Gazo)	22	Loin du monde
2020	"Hold-up" (feat. Alonzo & L'Algérino)	26	Loin du monde
2020	"Un autre monde"	28	Loin du monde
2020	"Guadalajara"	36	Loin du monde
2020	"Je vais pas redonner"	47	Loin du monde
2020	"Comme un voyou" (feat. Le Rat Luciano)	50	Loin du monde
2020	"S.U.V"	54	Loin du monde
2020	"Le gens" (feat. Houari, Moubarak & Gips)	64	Loin du monde
2021	"Feu" (feat. Poupie)	176	Loin du monde
2021	"Carré d'as"	6	Album gratuit vol. 6
2021	"Moi"	11	Album gratuit vol. 6
2021	"Ça me guintch"	20	Album gratuit vol. 6
2021	"Le crémeux"	35	Album gratuit vol. 6
2021	"En chair et en or"	39	Album gratuit vol. 6
2021	"C'est ça la vie"	53	Album gratuit vol. 6
2021	"Burberry"	60	Album gratuit vol. 6
2021	"Ovni présent"	72	Album gratuit vol. 6
2021	"Fou d'elle"	100	Album gratuit vol. 6
2021	"Bandit"	106	Album gratuit vol. 6
2021	"A coup de crick"	108	Album gratuit vol. 6
2021	"Vite faistre"	117	Album gratuit vol. 6
2021	"A l'impro"	124	Album gratuit vol. 6
2021	"Faux faire des chois" (feat. Moubarak, Houari & Gips)	189	Album gratuit vol. 6
2021	"Irréversible"	29	
2021	"Pic et pic, alcool et drame"	3	Demain ça ira
2021	"Alors la zone"	4	Demain ça ira
2021	"Le bouton"	11	Demain ça ira
2021	"Assassinat"	12	Demain ça ira
2021	"C'est la cité" (feat. Naps)	13	Demain ça ira
2021	"Je n'ai pas que des potes"	16	Demain ça ira
2021	"Je kill au mic"	17	Demain ça ira
2021	"Tereza"	20	Demain ça ira
2021	"Rosé jetski playa"	22	Demain ça ira
2021	"Limitless"	27	Demain ça ira
2021	"Cassage de nuques, pt. 4"	30	Demain ça ira
2021	"Tragique"	34	Demain ça ira
2021	"Transporteur"	35	Demain ça ira
2021	"Tchyco"	38	Demain ça ira
2021	"Finito"	39	Demain ça ira
2021	"G-shock"	44	Demain ça ira
2021	"Je m'endors mal luné" (feat. Nordo)	45	Demain ça ira
2021	"Mental d'or et de platine"	51	Demain ça ira
2021	"John"	92	non-album release
2021	"C'est la cité" (feat. Naps)	13	non-album release
2021	"La Street"	47	Indépendance
2022	"La Recette"	75	non-album release
2022	"Superstar"	5	Extraterrestre
2022	"Ténébreux"	10	Extraterrestre
2022	"Ça tourne dans ma téte"	12	Extraterrestre
2022	"J'éteins mon téléphone"	14	Extraterrestre
2022	"Ma drogue"	18	Extraterrestre
2022	"Gigi"	19	Extraterrestre
2022	"Sur la Costa del Sol"	21	Extraterrestre
2022	"Faut pas (Extraterrestre)"	22	Extraterrestre
2022	"J'ai le démon"	27	Extraterrestre
2022	"Cour blessé"	29	Extraterrestre
2022	"Sous la simond"	30	Extraterrestre
2022	"Comme au bon vieux temps"	37	Extraterrestre
2022	"Flouz"	39	Extraterrestre
2022	"Avec José"	42	Extraterrestre
2022	"Courtoisie"	46	Extraterrestre
2022	"Je te veux toi"	49	Extraterrestre
2022	"Dans la loge"	59	Extraterrestre
2022	"1 fois mais pas 2"	63	Extraterrestre
2022	"En two two bé"	66	Extraterrestre
2022	"Le 100 Le 100"	12	Cœur Blanc
2022	"Konami"	18	Cœur Blanc
2022	"Beuh À La Noix De Coco"	19	Cœur Blanc
2022	"Chocolata"	21	Cœur Blanc
2022	"Forbidden"	27	Cœur Blanc
2022	"Eh Ça Va Guy"	28	Cœur Blanc
2022	"Heros"	33	Cœur Blanc
2022	"C'est Pas La Mairie"	34	Cœur Blanc
2022	"Camouflage"	37	Cœur Blanc
2022	"Grazie La Zone"	41	Cœur Blanc
2022	"Mon Cour Pour Toi"	43	Cœur Blanc
2022	"Pistolet 45"	53	Cœur Blanc
2022	"Le Rrrin"	55	Cœur Blanc
2022	"Europa"	61	Cœur Blanc
2022	"U Pistulettu"	70	Cœur Blanc
2022	"Perché"	75	Cœur Blanc
2022	"Je Le Savais"	79	Cœur Blanc
2022	"Premiére League"	92	Cœur Blanc
2023	"EntraÎnement"	3	C'est quand qu'il s'éteint ?
2023	"Alcantara"	11	C'est quand qu'il s'éteint ?
2023	"Coco"	13	C'est quand qu'il s'éteint ?
2023	"Ragnar"	14	C'est quand qu'il s'éteint ?
2023	"DP sur le maillot"	16	C'est quand qu'il s'éteint ?
2023	"Chagriné"	18	C'est quand qu'il s'éteint ?
2023	"Courtois"	24	C'est quand qu'il s'éteint ?
2023	"Mazé"	25	C'est quand qu'il s'éteint ?
2023	"Range ton égo"	31	C'est quand qu'il s'éteint ?
2023	"Droit au but"	33	C'est quand qu'il s'éteint ?
2023	"Montana"	47	C'est quand qu'il s'éteint ?
2023	"Sentimental"	54	C'est quand qu'il s'éteint ?
2023	"À la vue"	57	C'est quand qu'il s'éteint ?
2023	"Faut s'enfuir"	63	C'est quand qu'il s'éteint ?
2023	"Ma gentillesse"	64	C'est quand qu'il s'éteint ?
2023	"Opérationnel"	67	C'est quand qu'il s'éteint ?
2023	"Je m'en fous de tout"	78	C'est quand qu'il s'éteint ?
2023	"Mon sucre d'amour"	86	C'est quand qu'il s'éteint ?
2023	"Uwa ni lé"	89	C'est quand qu'il s'éteint ?
2023	"Postiché" (feat. PLK)	4	La route est longue
2023	"La fusion" (feat. Alonzo)	10	La route est longue
2023	"Miné sur Panamé" (feat. Tiakola)	12	La route est longue
2023	"La màquina"	19	La route est longue
2023	"Le rappeur à 3 lettres"	20	La route est longue
2023	"Beuh d'Hollande"	15	La route est longue
2023	"Battistu"	22	La route est longue
2023	"Juste un bisou" (feat. Naza)	24	La route est longue
2023	"Sensations"	25	La route est longue
2023	"Luffy"	27	La route est longue
2023	"Y'a plus de raison"	29	La route est longue
2023	"C'est pas facile"	31	La route est longue
2023	"Dans ma mama"	34	La route est longue
2023	"J'fais que danser"	39	La route est longue
2023	"J'suis pas devin"	41	La route est longue
2023	"La route est longue"	42	La route est longue
2023	"Au-dessus de l'Atlas"	47	La route est longue
2023	"Sherbet"	49	La route est longue
2023	"Sali"	56	La route est longue
2023	"En revenant d'Alicante"	65	La route est longue
2023	"Y'a pas d'âge pour pleurer"	69	La route est longue
2023	"Business"	72	La route est longue
2024	"Le trio ternura"	25	Décennie
2024	"Love de toi"	32	Décennie
2024	"Siége chauffant"	33	Décennie
2024	"Avec tonton"	34	Décennie
2024	"D'or et de diamant"	35	Décennie
2024	"TP dans le froid"	37	Décennie
2024	"Vacancia"	40	Décennie
2024	"Je salue"	52	Décennie
2024	"C'est pas grandiose"	60	Décennie
2024	"Blocco"	61	Décennie
2024	"Tout ce qu'il faut"	69	Décennie
2024	"On sent pas les coups"	77	Décennie
2024	"Mon top model"	79	Décennie
2024	"Power"	80	Décennie
2024	"Pitchi Mamore"	90	Décennie
2024	"Découpage"	100	Décennie
2024	"Mafiosa"	19	Mise à jour
2024	"Gta"	30	Mise à jour
2024	"Me prends pas la téte"	33	Mise à jour
2024	"Tié fou"	35	Mise à jour
2024	"Vida loca"	57	Mise à jour
2024	"Holà que tal ?"	61	Mise à jour
2024	"Je change pas"	68	Mise à jour
2024	"Vrai sancho"	69	Mise à jour
2024	"Le couz du 12"	75	Mise à jour
2024	"Dans l'RS3"	77	Mise à jour
2024	"BB"	78	Mise à jour
2024	"No remords"	82	Mise à jour
2024	"I'm Sorry"	93	Mise à jour
2025	"Mimi"	5	D&P à vie
2025	"2 coups d'avance"	12	D&P à vie
2025	"Bentayga"	13	D&P à vie
2025	"Wouaw"	21	D&P à vie
2025	"Cache ta Rolex"	25	D&P à vie
2025	"Sous l'eau"	27	D&P à vie
2025	"Je t'aime pour la vie"	32	D&P à vie
2025	"Ma puce"	33	D&P à vie
2025	"Love et haine"	34	D&P à vie
2025	"Tu sais d'oû je viens"	36	D&P à vie
2025	"4 4 2"	50	D&P à vie
2025	"Aprés l'apéro"	57	D&P à vie
2025	"D&p à vie"	60	D&P à vie
2025	"J'ai besoin d'air"	70	D&P à vie
2025	"Comme tu fais on te fera"	74	D&P à vie
2025	"Ils le savent"	85	D&P à vie
2025	"TP Sur TP"	22	TP Sur TP
2025	"BDR"	24	TP Sur TP
2025	"Je Suis Love"	26	TP Sur TP
2025	"Ma P'Tite Prison"	29	TP Sur TP
2025	"Que Tu Quieres"	34	TP Sur TP
2025	"Cassage de Nuques, Pt. 5"	44	TP Sur TP
2025	"Tu Tenenew"	50	TP Sur TP
2025	"Par Intèrèt"	56	TP Sur TP
2025	"Des Inconnus"	72	TP Sur TP
2025	"Je Suis Pas Comme Toi"	79	TP Sur TP
2025	"Triste Everyday"	52	TP Sur TP
2025	"La Solitudine"	98	TP Sur TP
