= Japanese salvage ship Kamikaze Maru No. 5 =

Japanese naval ship

History

Empire of Japan
- Name: Kamikaze Maru No. 5
- Launched: 14 July 1939
- Completed: 26 August 1939
- Acquired: requisitioned by Imperial Japanese Navy, 26 February 1942
- Homeport: Sasebo
- Identification: 46215
- Fate: unknown
- Notes: Call sign: JWGN

General characteristics
- Type: schooner
- Tonnage: 257 GRT
- Length: 36.5 m (119 ft 9 in)
- Beam: 7.3 m (23 ft 11 in)
- Draught: 4.1 m (13 ft 5 in)

Kamikaze Maru No. 5 (Japanese: 第五神風丸) was a wood-hulled schooner that served as an auxiliary salvage and repair ship of the Imperial Japanese Navy during World War II.

== History ==
Kamikaze Maru No. 5 was laid down at the Sasebo shipyard of Matsuura Shipbuilding (松浦造船所) at the behest of Kojiro Linuma (飯沼耕次郎). She was wood-hulled. Kamikaze Maru No.5 was launched and named on 14 July 1939, completed 26 August 1939, and registered in Tokyo. On 26 February 1942, she was requisitioned by the Imperial Japanese Navy for service as a salvage ship and assigned to the Sasebo Naval District. On 25 April 1942, she departed Sasebo arriving on 3 May 1942 at Hong Kong where she assisted in salvaging the many vessels scuttled by the fleeing British forces during the Battle of Hong Kong. On 15 May 1942, she departed Hong Kong arriving on 21 May 1942 at Manila where she assisted in salvaging the many vessels scuttled by the fleeing American forces after the Battle of Corregidor. She remained in Manila until 20 February 1944 when she left for Negros Island for a brief salvage operation returning to Manila on 22 February 1944. Along with her fellow salvage ship Kamikaze Maru No. 7, she attempted to raise the submarine tender USS Canopus which had been scuttled in Mariveles Bay on the Bataan peninsula across from Corregidor but was unsuccessful.

She survived the war; her ultimate fate is unknown.
